= 2026 London, Ontario, municipal election =

Canadian municipal election

2026 London municipal election
- October 26, 2026
- Turnout: 31.01%
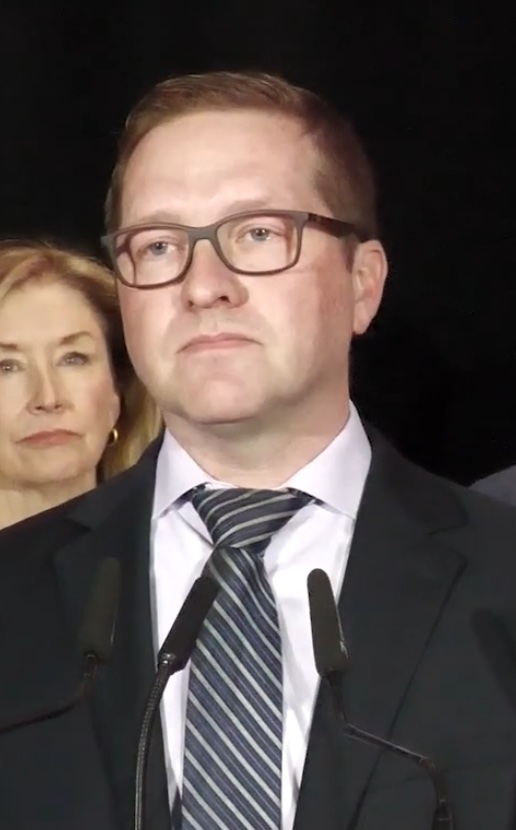
		SS
Candidate	Josh Morgan	Susan Stevenson
Popular vote	46,405	27,259
Percentage	45.42%	26.68%
	KK	BJM
Candidate	Kirsten Krose	Bronagh Joyce Morgan
Popular vote	10,984	7,410
Percentage	10.75%	7.25%
Mayor before election
Josh Morgan
Elected mayor
Josh Morgan

Municipal elections were held on October 26, 2026, to elect the mayor and 14 city councillors in London, Ontario, Canada. In addition, school trustees were elected to the Thames Valley District School Board, London District Catholic School Board, Conseil scolaire Viamonde and Conseil scolaire catholique Providence. The election was held in conjunction with those held in other municipalities in the province of Ontario.

In this election, many ward boundaries were adjusted, especially wards 1, 3, 4, 5, 7, 12 and 14. Nominations opened on May 1 and ended on August 21. The new London City Council will be sworn in on November 15.

By a smaller margin than his previous landslide victory (though with a comparable number of total votes), incumbent mayor Josh Morgan defeated his main challenger, Susan Stevenson, to win re-election to a second term as mayor of London.

Turnout was 31.01%, representing a slight increase from the 2022 record low of 25.5%.

== Mayoral election ==
Incumbent mayor Josh Morgan, elected in 2022, announced in October 2025 that he would seek re-election to a second term. He was the first London mayor to seek re-election since Anne Marie DeCicco-Best in 2010, and the first mayor to be re-elected since DeCicco-Best in 2006.

Morgan was challenged by former Stephen Harper staffer Kirsten Krose, and Ward 4 councillor Susan Stevenson.

Below is a table of the candidates' vote totals:

Candidate	Vote	%
Josh Morgan (X)	46,405	45.42
Susan Stevenson	27,259	26.68
Kirsten Krose	10,984	10.75
Bronagh Joyce Morgan	7,410	7.25
Tariq Khan	4,090	4.00
John Feher	1,590	1.56
Mustafa Zeboon (Note: Zeboon's campaign website, ZebuunForMayor.ca, spells his last name two different ways (the bottom states "Authorized and published by the Mustafa Zeboon For Mayor Campaign"). The spelling listed on the City of London's official website is 'Zeboon'.)	1,544	1.51
Christine Rosehart	1,045	1.02
Lawrence-Zachary Howe	609	0.60
Dan Lenart	490	0.48
Barry Douglas Jacklin	460	0.45
Jeff Yam	287	0.28

== City council elections ==
Map of London's wards used for the 2026 election. Some of the city's wards saw substantial boundary changes

The following candidates are registered to run for ward seats on London City Council:

=== Ward 1 ===
Incumbent councillor Hadleigh McAlister, first elected in 2022, was re-elected to a second term, defeating former councillor Roger Caranci.

Candidate	Vote	%
Hadleigh McAlister (X)	3,760	57.84
Roger Caranci	2,741	42.16

=== Ward 2 ===
Incumbent councillor and deputy mayor Shawn Lewis, first elected in 2018, was re-elected to a third term.

Candidate	Vote	%
Shawn Lewis (X)	4,138	65.19
Steve Reed	981	15.45
Zack Ramsey	650	10.24
Alexandria Hames	579	9.12

=== Ward 3 ===
Incumbent councillor Peter Cuddy, elected in 2022, has lost re-election to Ben Durham.

Candidate	Vote	%
Ben Durham	2,253	37.49
Peter Cuddy (X)	2,045	34.03
Leroy Osbourne	745	12.40
Zak Rahim	476	7.92
Riya Philip	442	7.35
Harkirat Kaur	49	0.82

=== Ward 4 ===
Incumbent councillor Susan Stevenson, elected in 2022, is running for mayor.

Candidate	Vote	%
Tom Cull	2,428	35.95
Mario Jozic	1,851	27.41
Stephen Orser	920	13.62
Bob Wright	838	12.41
Elivis Birindwa	279	4.13
Bonnie Baleck	184	2.72
Randi Prunner	130	1.92
Ray Daamen	64	0.95
Alan Lieknins	60	0.89

=== Ward 5 ===
Incumbent councillor Jerry Pribil, elected in 2022, will not seek re-election. Incumbent councillor of ward 7, Corrine Rahman, was re-elected in ward 5.

Candidate	Vote	%
Corrine Rahman	5,438	62.66
Charles Spina	1,579	18.20
Mary Blake Rose	1,265	14.58
Simon Karikkassery	258	2.97
Abid Raza	138	1.59

=== Ward 6 ===
Incumbent councillor Sam Trosow, elected in 2022, was re-elected to a second term.

Candidate	Vote	%
Sam Trosow (X)	2,466	48.14
Stephanie Marentette	1,447	28.25
Ian Sterling Leishman	907	17.70
Naomi Nadea	303	5.91

=== Ward 7 ===
Incumbent councillor Corrine Rahman, elected in 2022, ran for re-election in ward 5. Jonathan Sher was elected to a first term.

Candidate	Vote	%
Jonathan Sher	2,522	32.16
Dan Meinen	2,440	31.11
Waseem Kazzah	973	12.41
Sam Hajar	510	6.50
Bensy Mathew	493	6.29
Kamrul Ahsan	491	6.26
German Gutierrez	372	4.36
Djuma Moïse Sharifu	71	0.91

=== Ward 8 ===
Incumbent councillor Steve Lehman, elected in 2018, was re-elected to a third term.

Candidate	Vote	%
Steve Lehman (X)	5,005	67.75
Osam Ali	1,207	16.34
Coralia Tudor	1,175	15.91

=== Ward 9 ===
Incumbent councillor Anna Hopkins, elected in 2014, was re-elected to a fourth term.

Candidate	Vote	%
Anna Hopkins (X)	4,284	39.64
Luke Thomas	3,597	33.29
Tammy Abi-Khalil	1,489	13.78
Matt Millar	1,063	9.84
Dino Jose	218	2.02
Veronica Warner	155	1.43

=== Ward 10 ===
Incumbent councillor Paul Van Meerbergen, elected in 2018, was re-elected to a third term.

Candidate	Vote	%
Paul Van Meerbergen (X)	3,498	43.07
Lois Margaret Ward	2,042	25.14
Alexander Moore	1,393	17.15
Juman Al-Jumaili	659	8.11
Steven Edwards	529	6.51

=== Ward 11 ===
Incumbent councillor Skylar Franke, elected in 2022, was re-elected to a second term.

Candidate	Vote	%
Skylar Franke (X)	6,740	75.77
Denise Brown	1,464	16.46
Harinder Kumar	691	7.77

=== Ward 12 ===
Incumbent councillor Elizabeth Peloza, elected in 2018, was re-elected to a third term.

Candidate	Vote	%
Elizabeth Peloza (X)	5,048	78.90
Alexander Main	712	11.13
Ribal Zebian	638	9.97

=== Ward 13 ===
Incumbent councillor David Ferreira, elected in 2022, was re-elected to a second term.

Candidate	Vote	%
David Ferreira (X)	4,308	69.54
Andrew Joseph Crook	735	11.86
Schelley Bisson	437	7.05
Stephen D'Amelio	305	4.92
Jari Spence	185	2.99
Tony Biviano	159	2.57
Nicholas Saika-Voivod	66	1.07

=== Ward 14 ===
Incumbent councillor Steven Hillier, elected in 2018, did not seek re-election. Jason King was elected to a first-term, defeating Sarah Lehman.

Candidate	Vote	%
Jason King	3,218	52.45
Sarah Lehman	2,569	41.87
Ubaid Bhatti	208	3.39
Gurinder Pal Singh	140	2.28

== Notes ==
Preceded by 2022 election	List of London, Ontario, municipal elections	Succeeded by 2030 election
