= 2010 London, Ontario, municipal election =

Nayan Nilim

2010 London municipal election
- October 25, 2010
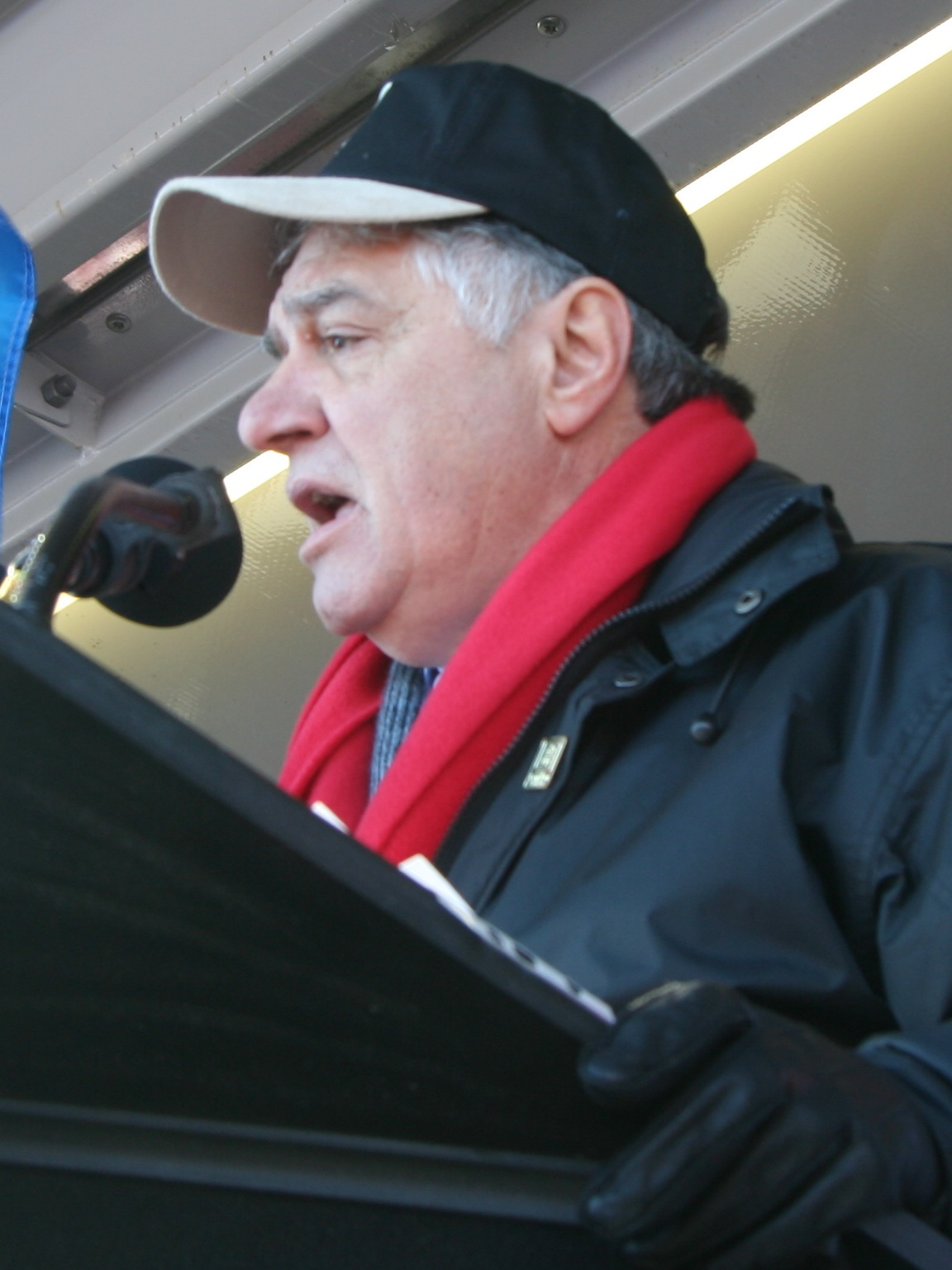
		AMDB
Candidate	Joe Fontana	Anne Marie DeCicco-Best
Popular vote	48,626	46,089
Percentage	47.2%	44.8%
Mayor before election
Anne-Marie DeCicco-Best
Elected mayor
Joe Fontana

The 2010 London municipal election was held on October 25, 2010, in London, Ontario, Canada, to elect the Mayor of London, London City Council and the Thames Valley District School Board, London District Catholic School Board, Conseil scolaire catholique Providence and Conseil scolaire Viamonde. The election was held in conjunction with the province-wide 2010 municipal elections.

This is the most recent London mayoral election in which the winning candidate did not receive a majority of the final vote. It is also the most recent election in which the winner and runner-up placed within five percentage points of each other, and the most recent election in which the incumbent mayor ran for re-election.

In a rematch of the 2006 election, former Liberal MP for London North Centre Joe Fontana narrowly defeated incumbent mayor Anne Marie DeCicco-Best, ending the longest mayoralty in London's history and becoming the 61st mayor of London.

== Election results ==
Names in bold denotes elected candidates.
(X) denotes incumbent.

The candidates who registered to run for London City Council are as follows:

=== Mayor ===
One candidate to be elected.

Mayoral Candidate	Vote	%
**Joe Fontana**	48,626	47.2
Anne Marie DeCicco-Best (X)	46,089	44.8
Cynthia Etheridge	4,402	4.3
Eric Southern	644	0.6
Ivan W. Kasiurak	612	0.6
Christopher R. Foerster	462	0.4
Aaron Broughm	427	0.4
Wayne Ford	375	0.4
Zak Young	298	0.3
Stephen Elliott Beckles	252	0.2
Tomasz Winnicki	234	0.2
Dan Lenart	173	0.2
Tom Ha	149	0.1
Ma'in Sinan	128	0.1
Jonas Richard White	83	0.1

=== Councillors ===
One candidate per ward to be elected.

==== Ward 1 ====
Candidate	Votes	%
**Bud Polhill**	3904	61.73
Marcel Santos	992	15.69
Raymond John Day	552	8.73
Bonnie Glazer	477	7.54
Gilles Longtin	399	6.31

==== Ward 2 ====
Candidate	Votes	%
**Bill Armstrong** (X)	3,196	50.11
Steve Polhill	2,896	45.41
Shirley Wilton	286	4.48

==== Ward 3 ====
Candidate	Votes	%
**Joe Swan**	1,832	33.73
Henry Zupanc	1,480	27.25
Ali Haidar	1,102	20.29
Linda Freeman	551	10.14
Rod Morley	215	3.96
German Gutierrez	197	3.63
Tony Burns	55	1.01

==== Ward 4 ====
Candidate	Votes	%
**Stephen Orser** (X)	3,020	50.67
Greg Thompson	2,195	36.83
Karen Appleton	387	6.49
Gloria Lee-Jones	358	6.01
Christina MacRae	312	4.94
George van der Schel	95	1.51

==== Ward 5 ====
Candidate	Votes	%
**Joni Baechler** (X)	7,318	82
Rebecca K. Wilson	1,555	18

==== Ward 6 ====
Candidate	Votes	%
**Nancy Branscombe** (X)	4,723	76
Greg Munro	816	13
Bob Howard	673	1

==== Ward 7 ====
Candidate	Votes	%
**Matt Brown**	4,976	58.16
Walter Loc (X)	1,818	21.25
Phil McLeod	1,455	17.01
Justin Samlal	307	3.59

==== Ward 8 ====
Candidate	Votes	%
**Paul Hubert** (X)	5,678	71.74
Martha Joyce	1,978	24.99
Ian Stumpf	259	3.27

==== Ward 9 ====
Candidate	Votes	%
**Dale Henderson**	4,103	44.55
Gina Barber	3,891	42.25
Jim Horne	1,215	13.19

==== Ward 10 ====
Candidate	Votes	%
**Paul Van Meerbergen** (X)	6,166	79.20
Milyn Hall	1,619	20.80

==== Ward 11 ====
Candidate	Votes	%
**Denise Brown**	4,267	50.29
David Winninger (X)	3,457	40.75
Loren Demelo	760	8.96

==== Ward 12 ====
Candidate	Votes	%
**Harold Usher** (X)	3,800	52.37
Tom Foster	1,447	19.94
Gordon Saylor	1,310	18.05
Najam Naqvi	398	5.49
Mike Yohkicki	190	2.62
Robert Heblethwaite	111	1.53

==== Ward 13 ====
Candidate	Votes	%
**Judy Bryant** (X)	3045	67.82
Mary Bray	722	16.08
Chris Edgar	511	11.38
Michael Concannon	212	4.72

==== Ward 14 ====
Candidate	Votes	%
**Sandy White** (X)	1721	26.64
Jared Zaifman	1605	24.84
Jim Wood	1507	23.32
Michelle Smith	1187	18.37
Gil Warren	441	6.83

Preceded by 2006 election	List of London, Ontario municipal elections	Succeeded by 2014 election
