= 2014 London, Ontario, municipal election =

2014 London municipal election
- October 27, 2014
	MB	PC
Candidate	Matt Brown	Paul Cheng
Popular vote	63,842	37,938
Percentage	57.75%	34.32%
Mayor before election
Joni Baechler
Elected mayor
Matt Brown

The 2014 London municipal election was held on October 27, 2014, in London, Ontario, Canada, to elect the Mayor of London, London City Council and the Thames Valley District School Board, London District Catholic School Board, Conseil scolaire catholique Providence and Conseil scolaire Viamonde. The election was held in conjunction with the province-wide 2014 municipal elections.

Ward 7 Councillor Matt Brown decisively defeated local businessman Paul Cheng to become the 63rd mayor of London.

== Timeline ==
- January 2: Nomination period begins
- September 12: Nomination period ends
- September 15: List of candidates elected by acclamation released.
- October 11: Advanced Ballot voting begins
- October 18: Advanced Ballot voting ends
- October 27: Election Day

== Election results ==
Official List of Candidates

Names in bold denotes elected candidates.
(X) denotes incumbent.

=== Mayor ===
One candidate to be elected.

Mayoral Candidate	Vote	%
**Matt Brown**	63,842	57.75
Paul Cheng	37,938	34.32
Joe Swan	4,623	4.18
Roger Caranci	1,190	1.08
Arnon Kaplansky	700	0.63
Donna Kelley	543	0.49
Marie Miszczak	522	0.47
Steven Gardner	351	0.32
Jim Kogelheide	276	0.25
Tae Khun Ha	112	0.10
Dan Lenart	110	0.10
Dennis Perry	107	0.10
Alexander Main	87	0.08
Carlos Murray	76	0.07
Ma'in Sinan	74	0.07

=== Councillors ===
One candidate per ward to be elected.

==== Ward 1 ====
Candidate	Votes	%
**Michael van Holst**	3,042	50.67
Bud Polhill (X)	1,818	30.28
Judy Carter	828	13.79
James Beynen	315	5.25

==== Ward 2 ====
Candidate	Votes	%
**Bill Armstrong** (X)	2,499	38.97
Nancy McSloy	2,183	34.04
Steve Polhill	1,731	26.99

==== Ward 3 ====
Candidate	Votes	%
**Mo Mohamed Salih**	3,136	52.52
Henry Zupanc	904	15.14
Bill Harris	729	12.21
Garth Williams	695	11.64
Nick Masciotra	507	8.49

==== Ward 4 ====
Candidate	Votes	%
**Jesse Helmer**	3,734	59.18
Stephen Orser (X)	1,424	22.57
Fiona Graham	416	6.59
Paul Pesach Gray	329	5.21
Christina MacRae	312	4.94
George van der Schel	95	1.51

==== Ward 5 ====
Candidate	Votes	%
**Maureen Cassidy**	5,597	57.43
Randy Warden	1,708	17.53
William Gordon	740	7.59
Steve Hogg	656	6.73
Mike Fornelos	440	4.51
Kevin Labonte	370	3.80
Stanley Koza	172	1.76
Prashanth Thambipillai	63	0.65

==== Ward 6 ====
Candidate	Votes	%
**Phil Squire**	1,840	28.26
Marie Blosh	1,524	23.41
Mike Bloxam	1,189	18.26
Amir Farahi	847	13.01
Cynthia Etheridge	664	10.20
Alasdair Beaton	409	6.28
Flavio Iannialice	37	0.57

==== Ward 7 ====
Candidate	Votes	%
**Josh Morgan**	5,444	56.56
Donna Szpakowski	1,390	14.44
Michael Esposito	1,243	12.91
Matthew Kennedy	821	8.53
Osam Ali	777	7.55

==== Ward 8 ====
Candidate	Votes	%
**Paul Hubert** (X)	7,408	83.12
Thomas Risley	1,504	16.88

==== Ward 9 ====
Candidate	Votes	%
**Anna Hopkins**	4,956	46.23
Ali Chahbar	2,454	22.89
Jeffrey Schiller	1,529	14.26
Ed Corrigan	1,341	12.51
Doreen Gysbers	252	2.53
A. Eric Haidar	143	1.33
Frank Minifie	45	0.42

==== Ward 10 ====
Candidate	Votes	%
**Virginia Ridley**	4,359	51.21
Paul Van Meerbergen (X)	3,827	44.96
Bradley Robichaud	326	3.83

==== Ward 11 ====
Candidate	Votes	%
**Stephen Turner**	4,833	54.15
Denise T. Brown (X)	2,531	28.36
Menno Meijer	706	7.91
Patrick Copps	382	4.28
Joan Martin	343	3.84
Clive Jenkins	131	1.47

==== Ward 12 ====
Candidate	Votes	%
**Harold Usher** (X)	3,475	48.44
Peter Ferguson	3,171	44.20
Jesse Haidar	528	7.36

==== Ward 13 ====
Candidate	Votes	%
**Tanya Park**	2,065	39.99
John Fyfe-Millar	1,253	24.26
David Winninger	859	16.63
Kim Bardai	355	6.87
Chris Edgar	249	4.82
Gordon Saylor	233	4.51
Elizabeth Efthymiadis	150	2.90

==== Ward 14 ====
Candidate	Votes	%
**Jared Zaifman**	2,597	38.99
Sandy E. White (X)	1,649	24.76
Steven Hillier	1,190	17.87
Allan Tipping	862	12.94
Sean M. O'Connell	234	3.51
Ali Hamadi	129	1.94

==== Withdrawn Candidates ====
- On October 14, Roger Caranci announced that he would step down from his mayoral campaign and put his support behind candidate Paul Cheng. The official deadline to drop out of the mayoral race was Sept 12, Caranci's name remained on the ballot on election day.

==== Incumbents Not Seeking Re-Election ====
- Joni Baechler, interim Mayor
- Joe Swan, Ward 3 Councillor (ran for mayor)
- Russ Monteith, interim Ward 5 Councillor
- Nancy Branscombe, Ward 6 Councillor
- Matt Brown, Ward 7 Councillor (ran for mayor)
- Dale Henderson, Ward 9 Councillor
- Judy Bryant, Ward 13 Councillor

== Thames Valley District School Board ==
=== Wards 1, 11, 12 & 14 ===
Two candidates to be elected.

Candidate	Votes	%
Sherri Polhill	7,939	24.7
Ruth Tisdale	7,251	22.6
Shawn Lewis	5,243	16.3
Christine Morgan	4,450	13.8
Chris Loblaw	3,756	11.7
Frank Gerrits	2,045	6.4
Knute Dohnberg	1,466	4.6

=== Wards 2, 3, 4, 5 & 6 ===
Two candidates to be elected.

Candidate	Votes	%
Peter Jaffe	12,263	30.7
Matthew Reid	10,974	27.4
Darlene Snyders	9,741	24.4
Michael Dawthorne	3,077	7.7
Eric Southern	2,373	5.9
Shiv Chokhani	1,574	3.9

=== Wards 7, 8, 9, 10 & 13 ===
Two candidates to be elected.

Candidate	Votes	%
Joyce Bennett	13,267	29.7
Jake Skinner	9,632	21.6
Kathy Kaill	4,549	10.2
Dan Judson	4,155	9.3
Chris Barton	3,940	8.8
Brenda Ryan	3,474	7.8
Linda Ludwar	1,752	3.9
Leroy Osbourne	1,693	3.8
Kyle Case	1,124	2.5
Jerry Cripps	1024	2.3

== London District Catholic School Board ==
=== Wards 1 & 14 ===
One candidate to be elected.

Candidate	Votes	%
Pedro Almeida (X)	1,377	60.0
Kevin Barry	917	40.0

=== Wards 2, 3 & 4 ===
One candidate to be elected.

Candidate	Votes	%
Sandra Cruz (X)	1,760	61.0
Betty Wright	828	28.7
Raul Gonzales	299	10.4

=== Wards 5, 6 & 7 ===
One candidate to be elected.

Candidate	Votes	%
Stephen Paul	1,841	44.1
Chris Bray	944	22.6
Nando Favaro	805	19.3
Arthur Macleod	586	14.0

=== Wards 8, 9 & 10 ===
One candidate to be elected.

Candidate	Votes	%
Linda Steel	Acclaimed	

=== Wards 11, 12 & 13 ===
One candidate to be elected.

Candidate	Votes	%
John Jevnikar	1,595	54.5
Roy D. Mantle	1,336	45.5

== Conseil scolaire catholique Providence ==
One candidate to be elected for the entire geographic area consisting of the City of London, the County of Middlesex, and the County of Elgin.

City of London results only.

Candidate	Votes	%
George le Mac	Acclaimed	

== Conseil scolaire Viamonde ==
One candidate to be elected for the entire geographic area of the Regional Municipality of Waterloo, the County of Wellington, the County of Middlesex, the County of Perth, and the County of Huron.

City of London results only.

Candidate	Votes	%
Denis Trudel (X)	276	42.5
Johanne R. Gray	248	38.2
Denise Alice Carter	126	19.4

Preceded by 2010 election	List of London, Ontario municipal elections	Succeeded by 2018 election
