= Josh Morgan (politician) =

Canadian politician

His Worship Josh Morgan
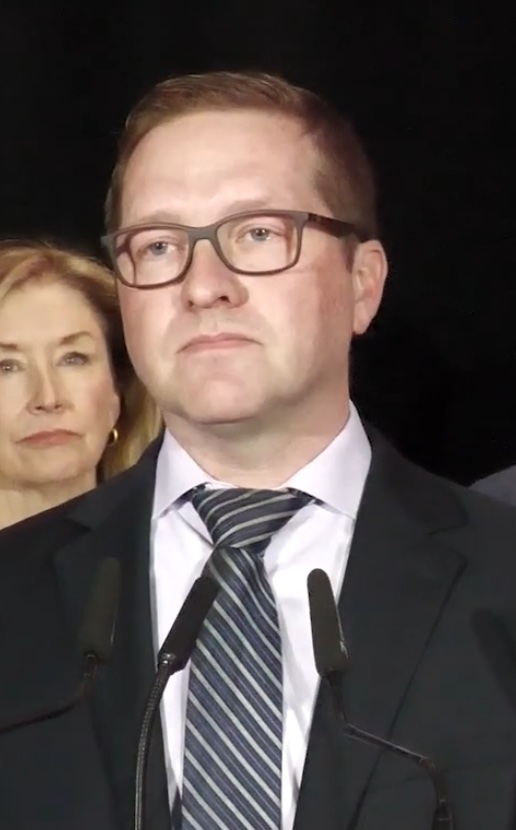
- Morgan speaking at the 2026 Federation of Canadian Municipalities Convention

65th Mayor of London
- Incumbent
- Assumed office November 15, 2022
- Deputy: Shawn Lewis; Corrine Rahman
- Preceded by: Ed Holder

London City Councillor
- In office 2014–2022
- Preceded by: Matt Brown
- Succeeded by: Corrine Rahman
- Constituency: Ward 7

Personal details
- Born: Joshua Douglas Morgan; 1978 (age 47–48) Camlachie, Ontario
- Party: Independent
- Children: 4
- Profession: Politician

Joshua Douglas Morgan (born c. 1978) is a Canadian politician who has been serving as the 65th mayor of London since 2022. He was elected mayor in the 2022 London municipal election, and won a second term in 2026.

== Early life ==
Joshua Douglas Morgan was born around 1978 in Camlachie, Ontario. He moved to London in 1998 to study economics and political science at the University of Western Ontario, receiving a combined honours BA in 2002. In 2004, he received an MA in political science (local government; Canadian government) from Western.

Morgan married his wife Melanie, whom he had met at Western, in 2007 in London, and they have four children together. In a joint statement, issued in May 2024, the couple announced they had amicably separated the previous summer.

== Early political career ==
Morgan's first campaign for a seat on London City Council came in 2006. He lost to Ward 8 incumbent Paul Hubert by 23 votes.

Morgan did not run in the 2010 municipal election, but did put his name on the ballot in 2014 seeking to represent Ward 7. This time, he was successful and won the seat by taking 56.56 per cent of the vote. During this term of council, Morgan was the mayor's appointed adviser on the 2016-2019 multi-year budget, London’s first multi-year budget.

Morgan was re-elected in 2018 as the Ward 7 city councillor, winning 75.2 per cent of the vote.

During this term of council, Morgan was appointed budget chair, a role he occupied until 2021. He was also appointed deputy mayor by Mayor Ed Holder in 2020.

=== 2022 mayoral campaign ===
Morgan filed his nomination papers to run for mayor of London in the 2022 election on May 26, 2022, two days after Holder announced he would not seek re-election.

During the campaign, Morgan received endorsements from Holder, London North Centre Liberal MP Peter Fragiskatos, London-Fanshawe New Democratic MP Lindsay Mathyssen, Elgin-Middlesex-London Conservative MP Karen Vecchio, and the London and District Labour Council.

Morgan was elected mayor on October 24, 2022, after having captured 65.72 per cent of the vote. Former Liberal MPP Khalil Ramal finished second with 22.59 per cent.

== Mayoralty (2022–present) ==
Morgan was sworn in as London's 65th mayor on November 15, 2022. During the inaugural meeting of the 2022-26 city council, Morgan nominated Ward 2 councillor Shawn Lewis to serve as deputy mayor, and Ward 12 councillor Elizabeth Peloza to serve as budget chair.

Morgan delivered his first State of the City address on January 17, 2023, before a crowd of approximately 1,300 people at RBC Place London. During his remarks, Morgan announced that an anonymous family had donated $25-million to support a new health and homelessness system in London. Morgan provided an update on the health and homelessness system during his second State of the City address on January 25, 2024. In his 2025 State of the City address, London Mayor Josh Morgan reported that the "Fund for Change" partnership reached $37 million in donations, supporting two homeless hubs and nearly 100 units of highly supportive housing. Additionally, Morgan pledged to cap the 2026 property tax increase at 5 per cent and called for increased federal and provincial investment to address health and housing challenges.

In November 2025, former city councillor Mariam Hamou was accused of extorting and harassing Morgan.

In October 2026, Morgan was re-elected mayor of London, becoming the first mayor since Anne Marie DeCicco-Best in 2006 to win another term in office.

=== Health and homelessness ===
During Morgan's first year as Mayor he worked alongside 200 individual leaders from all backgrounds representing more that 70 local organizations to develop a system to tackle homelessness and health issues. This initiative was titled the Whole of Community Response. Since its inception, the program has received recognition as being one of the most auspicious plans to address health and homelessness. An anonymous London family donated $25-million dollars to the cause, allowing for its swift implementation.

In late 2024, Morgan utilized "strong mayor" powers to direct city staff to develop a proposal for a 60-unit micro-modular emergency shelter site. The initiative aimed to address an urgent need for temporary housing before the winter season, with the units intended to remain in place for up to two years. While the plan was described by local social service agencies as an ambitious step toward addressing homelessness, Morgan noted that the final proposal would still be brought forward for a council vote to ensure democratic process and community consultation regarding the site's location.

London Mayor Josh Morgan seconded a motion through the Big City Mayors' Caucus calling on the Ontario government to declare a provincial state of emergency regarding the homelessness and addiction crisis. Morgan argued that reliance on municipal property taxes to fund emergency, long-term shelter solutions is unsustainable, noting municipalities absorbed over 51 per cent of the $4.1 billion spent on housing and homelessness projects in 2024.

=== Public safety ===
During Morgan's term, London saw a 6 per cent decline in crime severity in 2024 according to the Statistics Canada crime severity index. This overall decline included a reduction in non-violent offences like theft and breaking and entering, though shoplifting rates increased.

Following the 2024 approval of a four-year, $672-million police budget, the largest in the city's history the London Police Service reported improvements in several key areas by 2025. Average response times for the most urgent calls decreased from 9 minutes and 36 seconds to 9 minutes and 11 seconds, while response times for non-urgent public safety calls were reduced by nearly half. Under Morgan's administration, the city also launched integrated response strategies, including the Nurse-Police Response Teams (NPRT), which conducted over 190 interventions in their first nine weeks, with a 93% medical care acceptance rate. Additionally, a proactive “Open Air Drug Strategy” resulted in over 760 referrals to addiction and support services, with only 1% of interactions leading to criminal charges. Despite these improvements, the city also recorded a record high in shootings during the same period.

In 2024, during Morgan's second year as mayor, London saw a 6 per cent decline in its crime severity index according to Statistics Canada, driven largely by a reduction in non-violent offences such as theft and breaking and entering. During this period, the London Police Service maintained a 100% homicide clearance rate for the sixth consecutive year, with charges laid in all six of the city's homicides. Additionally, the city recorded a significant decrease in gunfire incidents, dropping from a record-high 28 shootings in 2023 to nine in 2024.

=== Economic development ===
In 2023, following the Ontario government's expansion of "strong mayor" powers to London, Morgan utilized the legislation to direct city staff to expedite several initiatives, including office-to-residential conversions and the development of micro-modular shelters. In early 2024, he used these powers to direct staff to develop options to keep the 2026 property tax increase below five per cent. Morgan has stated his preference for using the powers to accelerate administrative processes rather than vetoing council decisions.

During his term, Morgan oversaw the expansion of London's manufacturing sector, including the 2024 opening of a $33.6 million food processing facility by Andriani S.p.A. The project, which was the Italian pasta manufacturer's first North American plant, was estimated to create approximately 50 local jobs in the food manufacturing sector.

In his 2025 State of the City address, Morgan announced several major industrial investments, including British Columbia-based snack food manufacturer Inno Foods choosing London for its first expansion outside its home province, creating 90 initial jobs. He also highlighted the October 2025 opening of Italian pasta maker Andriani S.p.A.’s first production plant outside of Europe, a state-of-the-art facility representing an approximately $55 million investment.

=== Intergovernmental relations ===
In June 2023, Morgan was named chair of the Federation of Canadian Municipalities (FCM) Big City Mayors' Caucus. In early 2025, he participated in a "Team Canada" delegation to Washington, D.C., led by Ontario Premier Doug Ford, to lobby against proposed U.S. tariffs. During the mission, Morgan advocated for a united Canadian approach to trade, meeting with the U.S. Chamber of Commerce and various business leaders to discuss the impact of potential trade barriers on municipal economies.

As chair of the Big City Mayors' Caucus, Morgan met with federal leadership in early 2026 to advocate for accelerated infrastructure funding and a long-term national infrastructure plan to prevent delays in municipal housing and transit projects. During these discussions with Prime Minister Mark Carney, the delegation also emphasized the importance of public safety and the passage of Bill C-14 regarding bail reform for repeat offenders. Additionally, Morgan represented the caucus in "Team Canada" discussions with the federal government and Premier Doug Ford to coordinate municipal responses to potential U.S. trade tariffs.

London Mayor and FCM Big City Mayors’ Caucus chair Josh Morgan reported a productive February 2026 meeting with Prime Minister Mark Carney, focusing on aligning federal and municipal strategies for infrastructure, housing, and public safety. The discussions emphasized that urban infrastructure is vital for economic resilience and that federal-municipal cooperation is essential for addressing housing affordability and rising public safety threats, including the need for bail reform.

In his capacity as a chair of the Big City Mayors' Caucus, Morgan has advocated for a "new deal" for municipal funding, calling on the Ontario government to provide cities with revenue sources beyond property taxes, user fees, and provincial grants. He has argued that such a shift is necessary as municipalities take on increasing responsibilities for services traditionally managed by the province, including transit, social housing, and homeless shelters.

=== Housing ===
Under Morgan’s leadership, London reached 95 per cent of its provincially mandated housing target for 2024, resulting in nearly $12 million in rewards from Ontario’s Building Faster Fund. During this period, the city broke ground on 3,723 new homes and issued permits for over 3,700 more. As part of a pledge to build 47,000 units by 2031, Morgan oversaw the approval of significant high-density projects, including a 53-storey tower at the forks of the Thames, which is set to become the city's tallest building.

Morgan's administration has prioritized greater supply and streamlining approvals to address the housing crisis, aimed at creating a more affordable homebuyer and rental market. In 2025, London issued a record 5,462 building permits for new housing units and reached a record $2.71 billion in construction value, while also reporting an increase of 437 completed affordable units. In total since 2021, London has completed or is currently building over 3,300 affordable units, surpassing the target of the "Roadmap to 3000" plan. Since 2022, City Council approved more than 51,000 housing units across the spectrum, also exceeding the Province of Ontario's target with shorter development approval timelines following planning process reforms introduced during his term. Morgan also championed programs for Additional Residential Units (ARUs), offering Londoners various channels for grants and loans that help pay for renovations to add units to existing homes with space. The program's success grew by 12% in 2025 with a further 487 approved units.

In addition to provincial funding, London was recognized as one of the top three performing municipalities in Canada under the federal Housing Accelerator Fund (HAF). In 2024, the city received a $7.4 million "top-performer" bonus from the federal government for exceeding its first-year housing target by 157 units and implementing policies to reduce "red tape" for high-density infill developments. This brought the city's total federal housing grant to over $81 million during Morgan's term, with funds directed toward affordable housing and office-to-residential conversions.

In April 2024, London Mayor Josh Morgan led the first official joint meeting between the London City Council and the Oneida Nation of the Thames in 150 years to establish a partnership regarding housing, infrastructure, and economic growth. Following the summit, Morgan called for provincial amendments to the Municipal Act to reduce bureaucracy and encourage formal engagements with First Nations.

In 2024, Morgan utilized his "strong mayor" powers to direct city staff to evaluate municipal surface parking lots for redevelopment into high-density, mixed-use housing. He aimed for these projects to deliver "hundreds of new parking spaces and thousands of new residences" to revitalize the downtown core.

In his 2025 State of the City address, Morgan announced "Legacy Village," the largest residential development in London's history, which is planned to include 8,400 units at the former London Psychiatric Hospital site at Oxford and Highbury. He also highlighted that City Council approved the most significant expansion of as-of-right high-density zoning in 35 years, a move designed to fast-track multi-unit construction across the city's primary transit corridors.

=== Transportation ===
Morgan supported the Mobility Master Plan.

=== Boards and committees ===
As Mayor of London, Morgan serves on several key civic boards and organizations. He is a member of the London Police Service Board, which provides civilian oversight of the city's police force.

He also sits on the Board of Governors for Western University, overseeing academic governance at his alma mater.

Additionally, Morgan serves on the boards of the London Economic Development Corporation (LEDC), RBC Place London, and Tourism London. Despite some concerns, Morgan was appointed to the board of the London Public Library in March 2025.

=== Community and civic engagement ===
Morgan has advocated for the inclusion of the non-profit sector in municipal economic planning. In 2024, he emphasized that the sector should be recognized as a significant contributor to London's economy and included in the city's future economic development strategy.

During his 2025 State of the City address, Morgan highlighted collaborative efforts with several community organizations to address social issues, including Atlohsa Family Healing Services, Youth Opportunities Unlimited (YOU), London Cares, and the Canadian Mental Health Association (CMHA).

== Electoral record ==
2022 London Mayoral Election
Candidate	Votes	%
Josh Morgan	46,283	65.72%
Khalil Ramal	15,912	22.59%
Sandie Thomas	2,297	3.26%
Sean O'Connell	1,432	2.03%
Johanne Nichols	1,339	1.90%
Daniel Jeffery	810	1.15%
Brandon Ellis	747	1.06%
Dan Lenart	743	1.05%
Norman Robert Miles	536	0.76%
Carlos Murray	329	0.47%

2018 Municipal Election, Ward 7 City Council
Candidate	Votes	%
Josh Morgan	6,117	75.2%
Joe Kolenko	2,020	24.8%

2014 Municipal Election, Ward 7 City Council
Candidate	Votes	%
Josh Morgan	5,444	56.56%
Donna Szpakowski	1,390	14.44%
Michael Esposito	1,243	12.91%
Matthew Kennedy	821	8.53%
Osam ALI	777	7.55%

2006 Municipal Election, Ward 8 City Council
Candidate	Votes	%
Paul Hubert	2,392	28.6%
Josh Morgan	2,369	28.3%
Connie L. Graham	1,855	22.1%
Monica Jarabek	1,762	21.0%
