= 2018 London, Ontario, municipal election =

2018 London municipal election
- October 22, 2018
	ED	PP
Candidate	Ed Holder	Paul Paolatto
Round 13	44,373; 58.82%	31,061; 41.18%
Round 1	33,042; 34.19%	21,456; 22.20%
	TP	PC
Candidate	Tanya Park	Paul Cheng
Round 1	19,656; 20.34%	19,161; 19.83%
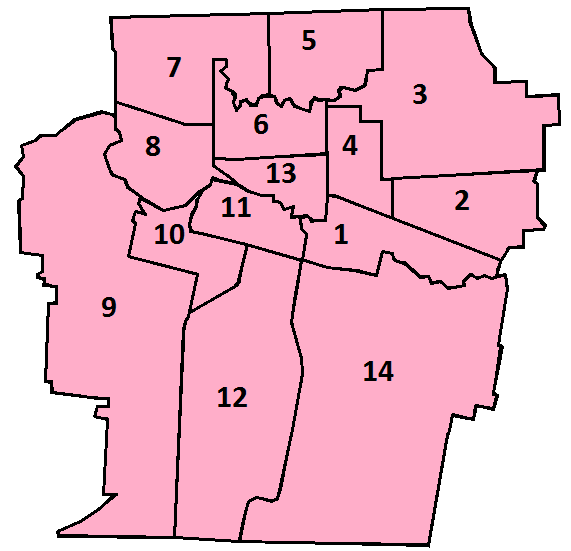
- Map of London's wards used in the 2018 election
Mayor before election
Matt Brown
Independent
Elected mayor
Ed Holder
Independent

The 2018 London municipal election was a municipal election that occurred on October 22, 2018, to elect the Mayor of London, London City Council and the Thames Valley District School Board, London District Catholic School Board, Conseil scolaire catholique Providence and Conseil scolaire Viamonde. The election was held on the same day as elections in every other municipality in Ontario.

As per the Ontario Municipal Elections Act, 1996, nomination papers for candidates for municipal and school board elections could be filed from May 1, 2018, at which time the campaign period began.

This election was notable as London became the first city in Canada since Calgary in 1971 to use preferential voting to elect city councillors and the mayor. It was also the only city in Ontario to use ranked balloting after the Wynne government allowed municipalities to do so in 2016 and before the Ford government reversed the decision in 2020, forcing London to return to first-past-the-post for the 2022 election.

The major issues facing candidates in this election included Bus Rapid Transit, safe injection sites, affordable rent and social housing stock as well as city unemployment rates.

Former Conservative MP for London West Ed Holder defeated Paul Paolatto, Tanya Park, Paul Cheng, and several minor candidates in the thirteenth round of instant-runoff voting to become the 64th mayor of London.

== Voting system ==
The use of instant-runoff voting meant (theoretically) that to be elected, a candidate for Council needed a majority of the ward vote. In the mayor's case, the successful candidate needed to have a majority of the city vote. Where no candidate had a majority in first preferences, vote transfers were used to assemble a majority behind one of them. London's rule that only two back-up preferences could be marked (and some voters' not even marking the three choices allowed) meant that in a few of the contests many votes had to be set aside as they had been transferred twice and still had not gone to a candidate with a chance to be elected. Although a majority is required to be elected, that could be a majority of votes still in play. Due to the number of votes being deemed invalid or becoming exhausted, in a few cases the majority accumulated by the winning candidate was less than a majority of valid votes or less than a majority of votes cast.

Holder, the winning mayoral candidate, was elected in the end with 44,373 votes when 48,320 was a majority of valid votes that were cast.

In Ward 5, Cassidy won with 3,922 votes, 44 percent of votes cast.

In Ward 8, Lehman won with 3,058 votes, 39 percent of votes cast.

In Ward 12, Peloza won with 3,139 votes, 48 percent of votes cast.

In Ward 13, Kayabaga won with 2,325 votes, 41 percent of votes cast.

In Ward 14, Hillier won with 2,522 votes, 48 percent of votes cast.

The amount of support recorded for the winning candidate is more than shown in those vote totals. Unusually, in the vote count for the 2018 London election, transfers of votes between candidates continued even after a candidate had accumulated a majority of votes still in play and had been declared the winner. In the mayoral contest for example, the winner (Holder) was determined in the 13th round so there was no need for a 14th round where Holder apparently is recorded as accumulating 100 percent of the votes.

That the winner in nine out of 15 of the contests held in London in 2018 was elected with a majority of votes cast is noteworthy though. In other municipal elections where first past the post is used, more than half the winners are elected with just a minority of votes cast. (The 2017 Edmonton municipal election is an example where this happened.)

Perhaps in part due to the large number of "exhausted" votes, the leader in the first count won in the end in all the contests in this election. There were no "turn-overs" caused by the front-runner not having the most overall support.

Although ranked ballots were expected to increase the civility of the election, it failed to prevent the creation of two negative websites targeting former city councillor, Virginia Ridley (ward 10), and city councillor, Maureen Cassidy (ward 5). The controversy has since triggered an OPP investigation into the behaviour of several organizations and candidates in the 2018 municipal election.

== Mayor ==
The mayoralty was an open seat, as incumbent mayor Matt Brown was not running for re-election.

London, Ontario mayoral election, 2018
Candidate	% 1st Pref	Count 1	Count 2	Count 3	Count 4	Count 5	Count 6	Count 7	Count 8	Count 9	Count 10	Count 11	Count 12	Count 13	Count 14
Ed Holder	34.2	33,042	33,056	33,073	33,101	33,135	33,183	33,240	33,280	33,325	33,391	33,543	38,690	44,373	57,609
Paul Paolatto	22.2	21,456	21,464	21,471	21,487	21,516	21,541	21,579	21,604	21,637	21,675	21,856	25,943	31,061	
Tanya Park	20.3	19,656	19,676	19,690	19,740	19,781	19,801	19,828	19,960	20,071	20,199	20,434	22,415		
Paul Cheng	19.8	19,161	19,175	19,190	19,211	19,238	19,254	19,329	19,362	19,396	19,442	19,616			
Mohamed Moussa	1.0	919	922	925	933	949	1,023	1,035	1,043	1,063	1,077				
Sean M. O'Connell	0.4	370	372	380	389	401	406	416	442	483					
David Millie	0.3	337	343	347	358	380	385	391	401						
Nina McCutcheon	0.4	340	344	351	361	364	375	384							
Vahide Bahramporian	0.4	348	351	351	357	363	368								
Ali Hamadi	0.3	304	304	304	306	311									
Dan Lenart	0.3	255	258	263	275										
Jordan Minter	0.2	212	217	224											
Carlos Murray	0.1	127	131												
Jonas White	0.1	111													
Electorate: 244,962 Valid: 96,638 Spoilt: 1,297 Quota: 48,320 Turnout: 40.0%

Analysis of transferred votes, ranked in order of 1st preference votes
Candidate	Maximum round	Maximum votes	Share in maximum round	Maximum votes First round votesTransfer votes
Ed Holder	14	57,609	100.0%	
Paul Paolatto	13	31,061	41.2%	
Tanya Park	12	22,415	25.8%	
Paul Cheng	11	19,616	20.6%	
Mohamed Moussa	10	1,077	1.1%	
Sean M. O'Connell	9	483	0.5%	
Vahide Bahramporian	6	368	0.4%	
Nina McCutcheon	7	384	0.4%	
David Millie	8	401	0.4%	
Al Hamadi	5	311	0.3%	
Dan Lenart	4	275	0.3%	
Jordan Minter	3	224	0.2%	
Carlos Murray	2	131	0.2%	
Jonas White	1	111	0.1%	
Eligible votes		96,638	59.6%	
Exhausted votes		39,029	40.4%	

== City Council ==
Ward 1 results
Candidate	Maximum round	Maximum votes	Share in maximum round	Maximum votes First round votesTransfer votes
Michael van Holst (X)	1	2,581	50.7%	
Melanie O'Brien	1	1,332	26.2%	
Bud Polhill	1	1,178	23.1%	
Eligible votes		5,091	100.0%	

Ward 2 results
Candidate	Maximum round	Maximum votes	Share in maximum round	Maximum votes First round votesTransfer votes
Shawn Lewis	1	3,481	63.9%	
Bill Armstrong (X)	1	1,799	33.1%	
Alan Jackson*	1	163	3.0%	
Eligible votes		5,443	100.0%	

*Withdrew in September 2018

Ward 3 results
Candidate	Maximum round	Maximum votes	Share in maximum round	Maximum votes First round votesTransfer votes
Mo Mohamed Salih (X)	1	3,421	72.8%	
Harry Prince	1	1,281	27.2%	
Eligible votes		4,702	100.0%	

Ward 4 results
Candidate	Maximum round	Maximum votes	Share in maximum round	Maximum votes First round votesTransfer votes
Jesse Helmer (X)	1	2,559	50.5%	
Stephen William Orser	1	1,191	23.5%	
Tricia Lystar	1	1,003	19.8%	
Connor Garrett	1	180	3.6%	
Xuemei Jiang	1	130	2.6%	
Eligible votes		5,063	100.0%	

Ward 5 results
Candidate	Maximum round	Maximum votes	Share in maximum round	Maximum votes First round votesTransfer votes
Maureen Cassidy (X)	6	4,741	100.0%	
Randy Warden	5	3,816	49.3%	
Charles Knott	4	1,833	21.6%	
Stephanie Marentette Di Battista	3	937	10.7%	
Shane Clarke	2	809	9.0%	
Shiv Chokhani	1	88	1.0%	
Eligible votes		9,002	52.7%	
Exhausted votes		4,261	47.3%	

Ward 6 results
Candidate	Maximum round	Maximum votes	Share in maximum round	Maximum votes First round votesTransfer votes
Philip Squire (X)	1	3,959	69.5%	
Mike Bloxam	1	1,737	30.5%	
Eligible votes		5,696	100.0%	

Ward 7 results
Candidate	Maximum round	Maximum votes	Share in maximum round	Maximum votes First round votesTransfer votes
Josh Morgan (X)	1	6,117	75.2%	
Joe Kolenko	1	2,020	24.8%	
Eligible votes		8,137	100.0%	

Ward 8 results
Candidate	Maximum round	Maximum votes	Share in maximum round	Maximum votes First round votesTransfer votes
Steve Lehman	9	3,823	100.0%	
Matt Reid	8	2,904	48.7%	
Bill Downie	7	1,282	19.3%	
Tariq Khan	6	1,059	14.6%	
Morena Hernandez	5	743	9.9%	
Osam Ali	4	464	6.1%	
Nour Hamid	3	374	4.8%	
Matthew Greer	2	191	2.4%	
Moon Inthavong	1	112	1.4%	
Eligible votes		7,835	48.7%	
Exhausted votes		4,012	51.2%	

Ward 9 results
Candidate	Maximum round	Maximum votes	Share in maximum round	Maximum votes First round votesTransfer votes
Anna Hopkins (X)	3	4,948	54.4%	
Matt Millar	3	2,606	28.7%	
Kyle Thompson	3	1,536	16.9%	
Ben Charlebois	2	922	9.9%	
Veronica Marie Warner	1	240	2.5%	
Eligible votes		9,418	96.5%	
Exhausted votes		328	3.5%	

Ward 10 results
Candidate	Maximum round	Maximum votes	Share in maximum round	Maximum votes First round votesTransfer votes
Paul Van Meerbergen	1	4,402	53.1%	
Virginia Ridley (X)	1	3,040	36.7%	
Kevin May	1	404	4.9%	
Gary Manley	1	298	3.6%	
Thomas Risley	1	140	1.7%	
Eligible votes		8,284	100.0%	

Ward 11 results
Candidate	Maximum round	Maximum votes	Share in maximum round	Maximum votes First round votesTransfer votes
Stephen Turner (X)	1	4,255	54.1%	
Rachel Powell	1	1,803	22.9%	
Vicki Van Linden	1	671	8.5%	
Paul-Michael Anderson	1	509	6.5%	
Menno Meijer	1	419	5.3%	
Eric H. Deleeuw	1	209	2.7%	
Eligible votes		7,866	100.0%	

Ward 12 results
Candidate	Maximum round	Maximum votes	Share in maximum round	Maximum votes First round votesTransfer votes
Elizabeth Peloza	5	3,403	58.3%	
Eric Weniger	5	2,434	41.7%	
Gord Evans	4	1,061	17.2%	
Rowa Mohamed	3	730	11.4%	
Faisal Mahmood	2	219	3.4%	
Jesse Haidar	1	132	2.0%	
Eligible votes		6,546	89.2%	
Exhausted votes		709	10.8%	

Ward 13 results
Candidate	Maximum round	Maximum votes	Share in maximum round	Maximum votes First round votesTransfer votes
Arielle Kayabaga	8	2,804	100.0%	
John Fyfe-Millar	7	2,186	48.5%	
Jonathan Hughes	6	1,100	21.6%	
Kevin Wilbee	5	831	15.3%	
Ben Benedict	4	391	7.5%	
Gil Warren	3	358	6.3%	
David Lundquist	2	240	4.2%	
Rod Morley	1	57	1.0%	
Eligible votes		5,714	49.1%	
Exhausted votes		2,910	50.9%	

Ward 14 results
Candidate	Maximum round	Maximum votes	Share in maximum round	Maximum votes First round votesTransfer votes
Steven Hillier	4	3,370	100.0%	
Jared Zaifman (X)	3	2,128	45.8%	
Allan Tipping	2	787	15.8%	
Annette Swalwell	1	647	12.4%	
Eligible votes		5,229	64.4%	
Exhausted votes		1,859	35.6%	

== School Board Trustee ==
TVDSB Wards 7, 8, 9, 10, 13

Elected: Joyce Bennett, Jake Skinner

TVDSB Wards 1, 11, 12, 14

Elected: Lori-Ann Pizzolato, Sheri Polhill

TVDSB Wards 2, 3, 4, 5, 6

Elected: Peter Cuddy, Corrine Rahman

LDCSB Wards 5, 6, 7

Elected: Gabe Pizzuti

LDCSB Wards 11, 12, 13

Elected: John Jevnikar

LDCSB Wards 1, 14

Elected: Pedro Almeida

LDCSB Wards 2, 3, 4

Elected: Sandra Cruz

LDCSB Wards 8, 9, 10

Elected: Linda Steel

Preceded by 2014 election	List of London, Ontario municipal elections	Succeeded by 2022 election
