= Joe Judge =

Joe or Joseph Judge may refer to:

- Joe Judge (American football) (born 1981), American football coach
- Joe Judge (baseball) (1894–1963), American baseball player
- Joe Judge (footballer) (born 1947), Scottish former amateur footballer
- Joseph Judge (1929–1996), American journalist

== See also ==
- Joseph Judd (1864–1926), Canadian lawyer and politician
