= London City Council =

Governing body of London, Ontario, Canada

London City Council is the governing body of the city of London, Ontario, Canada.

== Composition ==
London is divided into 14 wards, with residents in each ward electing one councillor. The mayor is elected citywide, who along with the councillors forms a 15-member council.

=== 2017 reform ===
In spite of some controversy about this move, London was the first city in Canada (in May 2017) to decide to move a ranked choice ballot for municipal elections starting in 2018. Voters will mark their ballots in order of preference, ranking their top three favourite candidates. An individual must reach 50 per cent of the total to be declared elected; in each round of counting where a candidate has not yet reached that target, the person with the fewest votes is dropped from the ballot and their second or third choice preferences reallocated to the remaining candidates, with this process repeating until a candidate has reached 50 per cent. On November 20, 2020, the Ontario Legislature passed Bill 218, the Supporting Ontario's Recovery and Municipal Elections Act, which included an amendment to the 1996 Municipal Elections Act to ban ranked balloting from being used in Ontario municipalities. This move was symbolically opposed in October by a 14-1 vote by City Council.

=== 2010 reform ===
Prior to the 2006 civic election, London's city council consisted of 14 councillors (two from each of the seven former wards), four members of Board of Control (elected citywide), and one mayor (elected citywide), to form a 19-member council.

The composition and structure of city council was the subject of two questions on the 2003 election ballot, an action initiated by Ward 3 Councillor Fred Tranquilli and his discussion paper, A Better Way, which proposed a smaller city council with 10 wards (one councillor per ward), plus the mayor elected citywide and the elimination of Board of Control for an 11-member city council.

While the yes votes prevailed, the overall voter turnout was less than 50 per cent and according to the provisions of the Municipal Act, the referendum results were not binding.

When council decided to maintain the status quo, a grassroots citizens' activism group, Imagine London, appealed to the Ontario Municipal Board (OMB) to change the ward composition to 14 wards defined by communities of interest in the city, including a separate ward for the downtown core.

UWO law librarian and media professor Sam Trosow argued the case at the OMB for Imagine London arguing that smaller wards based on communities of interest would result in more "effective representation" for the electorate. This argument is based on a 1991 Supreme Court of Canada decision involving electoral boundaries in the Province of Saskatchewan (often cited as the "Carter" case).

The OMB ruled for the Imagine London petitioners in late December 2005 and while the city sought leave to appeal the OMB decision to Superior Court via a full-day hearing in January 2006, leave to appeal was denied when Justice McDermid released his decision on February 28, 2006.

In the 2006 municipal election, a number of candidates included in their platforms the abolition of Board of Control. Among them was Gina Barber, a member of Imagine London, who gained a seat on the board of control, coming in second only to the deputy mayor, Tom Gosnell.

Following the election, a task force composed of a number of councillors, controllers, and citizen representatives was established to make recommendations on governance. The task force held numerous meetings and public hearings. On the basis of its deliberations, it recommended that the board of control be abolished and its functions assumed by a combination of standing committees, delegation to staff and citizen groups and Committee of the Whole. The recommendations were placed before a public participation meeting and subsequently adopted by council in a vote of 14 to 5. Consequently, positions for Board of Control were not on the 2010 municipal ballot.

== 1994–1997 ==
Council elected in the 1994 municipal election.

Councillor	Office	Notes
Dianne Haskett	Mayor	
Grant Hopcroft	Controller	
Dawn Erskine	Controller	
Vaughan Minor	Controller	
Diane Whiteside	Controller	
Sheila Davenport	Ward 1	
Joe Avola	Ward 1	
Joe Swan	Ward 2	
Bob Beccarea	Ward 2	
Bernie MacDonald	Ward 3	
Betty Howard	Ward 3	
Bill Armstrong	Ward 4	
Bud Polhill	Ward 4	
Anne Marie DeCicco	Ward 5	
Gary Williams	Ward 5	
Ben Veel	Ward 6	
Megan Walker	Ward 6	
Ted Wernham	Ward 7	
Martha Joyce	Ward 7	

== 1997–2000 ==
Council elected in the 1997 municipal election.

Councillor	Office	Notes
Dianne Haskett	Mayor	
Anne Marie DeCicco	Controller	
Orlando Zampronga	Controller	
Russ Monteith	Controller	
Diane Whiteside	Controller	
Ab Chahbar	Ward 1	
Sandy Levin	Ward 1	
Rob Alder	Ward 2	
Joe Swan	Ward 2	
Bernie MacDonald	Ward 3	
Fred Tranquilli	Ward 3	
Bill Armstrong	Ward 4	
Bud Polhill	Ward 4	
Cheryl Miller	Ward 5	
Gary Williams	Ward 5	
Ben Veel	Ward 6	
Megan Walker	Ward 6	
Susan Eagle	Ward 7	
Gord Hume	Ward 7	

== 2000–2003 ==
Council elected in the 2000 municipal election.

Councillor	Office	Notes
Anne Marie DeCicco	Mayor	
Gord Hume	Controller	
Russ Monteith	Controller	
Bud Polhill	Controller	
Joe Swan	Controller	
Ab Chahbar	Ward 1	
Sandy Levin	Ward 1	
Joni Baechler	Ward 2	
Rob Alder	Ward 2	
Bernie MacDonald	Ward 3	
Fred Tranquilli	Ward 3	
Bill Armstrong	Ward 4	
Roger Caranci	Ward 4	
Cheryl Miller	Ward 5	
Gary Williams	Ward 5	
David Winninger	Ward 6	
Harold Usher	Ward 6	
Susan Eagle	Ward 7	
Ed Corrigan	Ward 7	

== 2003–2006 ==
Council elected in the 2003 municipal election.

Councillor	Office	Notes
Anne Marie DeCicco	Mayor	
Tom Gosnell	Controller	
Gord Hume	Controller	
Russ Monteith	Controller	
Bud Polhill	Controller	
Ab Chahbar	Ward 1	
Judy Bryant	Ward 1	
Joni Baechler	Ward 2	
Rob Alder	Ward 2	
Bernie MacDonald	Ward 3	
Fred Tranquilli	Ward 3	
Bill Armstrong	Ward 4	
Roger Caranci	Ward 4	
Cheryl Miller	Ward 5	
Sandy White	Ward 5	
David Winninger	Ward 6	
Harold Usher	Ward 6	
Susan Eagle	Ward 7	
Paul Van Meerbergen	Ward 7	

== 2006–2010 ==
Council elected in the 2006 municipal election.

Councillor	Office	Notes
Anne-Marie DeCicco-Best	Mayor	
Gina Barber	Controller	
Tom Gosnell	Controller	
Gord Hume	Controller	
Bud Polhill	Controller	
Roger Caranci	Ward 1	
Bill Armstrong	Ward 2	
Bernie MacDonald	Ward 3	
Stephen Orser	Ward 4	
Joni Baechler	Ward 5	
Nancy Ann Branscombe	Ward 6	
Walter Lonc	Ward 7	
Paul Hubert	Ward 8	
Susan Eagle	Ward 9	
Paul Van Meerbergen	Ward 10	
David Winninger	Ward 11	
Harold Usher	Ward 12	
Judy Bryant	Ward 13	
Cheryl Miller	Ward 14	

== 2010–2014 ==
Council elected in the 2010 municipal election.

Councillor	Office	Notes
Joe Fontana	Mayor	Resigned on June 19, 2014 following a criminal conviction.
Bud Polhill	Ward 1	
Bill Armstrong	Ward 2	
Joe Swan	Ward 3	
Stephen Orser	Ward 4	
Joni Baechler	Ward 5	Appointed interim mayor on June 25, 2014 after Fontana's resignation.
Russell Monteith	Ward 5	Appointed as interim councillor for Ward 5 after Baechler's accession to the mayoralty.
Nancy Ann Branscombe	Ward 6	
Matt Brown	Ward 7	
Paul Hubert	Ward 8	
Dale Henderson	Ward 9	
Paul Van Meerbergen	Ward 10	
Denise Brown	Ward 11	
Harold Usher	Ward 12	
Judy Bryant	Ward 13	
Sandy White	Ward 14	

== 2014–2018 ==
Council elected in the 2014 municipal election.

Councillor	Office	Communities
Matt Brown	Mayor	
Michael van Holst	Ward 1	Chelsea Green, Fairmont
Bill Armstrong	Ward 2	Pottersburg, Nelson Park, Trafalgar Heights
Mo Mohamed Salih	Ward 3	Huron Heights
Jesse Helmer	Ward 4	East London
Maureen Cassidy	Ward 5	Stoneybrook, Northdale, Northeast, Uplands
Phil Squire	Ward 6	Broughdale, University Heights, Orchard Park, Sherwood Forest
Josh Morgan	Ward 7	White Hills, Medway Heights, Masonville, Hyde Park
Paul Hubert	Ward 8	Oakridge Park, Oakridge Acres,
Anna Hopkins	Ward 9	Byron, Lambeth
Virginia Ridley	Ward 10	Westmount
Stephen Turner	Ward 11	Cleardale, Southcrest Estates, Berkshire Village, Kensal Park, Manor Park
Harold Usher	Ward 12	Glendale, Southdale, Lockwood Park, White Oaks, Cleardale
Tanya Park	Ward 13	Downtown London, Midtown, Blackfriars, Piccadilly/Adelaide, SoHo, KeVa, Woodfield, Oxford Park
Jared Zaifman	Ward 14	Glen Cairn Woods, Pond Mills, Wilton Grove, Glanworth, Westminster

== 2018–2022 ==
Council elected in the 2018 municipal election.

Councillor	Office	Communities
Ed Holder	Mayor	
Michael van Holst	Ward 1	Hamilton Road, Chelsea Green, Fairmont, River Run, Glen Cairn
Shawn Lewis	Ward 2	Pottersburg, Nelson Park, Trafalgar Heights
Mo Mohamed Salih	Ward 3	Huron Heights
Jesse Helmer	Ward 4	East London
Maureen Cassidy	Ward 5	Stoneybrook, Northdale, Northeast, Uplands
Phil Squire (until 2021) Mariam Hamou (since 2021)	Ward 6	Broughdale, University Heights, Orchard Park, Sherwood Forest
Josh Morgan	Ward 7 Deputy Mayor	White Hills, Medway Heights, Masonville, Hyde Park
Steve Lehman	Ward 8	Oakridge Park, Oakridge Acres,
Anna Hopkins	Ward 9	Byron, Lambeth
Paul Van Meerbergen	Ward 10	Westmount
Stephen Turner	Ward 11	Cleardale, Southcrest Estates, Berkshire Village, Kensal Park, Manor Park
Elizabeth Peloza	Ward 12; Budget Chair	Glendale, Southdale, Lockwood Park, White Oaks, Cleardale
Arielle Kayabaga (until 2021) John Fyfe-Millar (since 2021)	Ward 13	Downtown London, Midtown, Blackfriars, Piccadilly/Adelaide, SoHo, KeVa, Woodfield, Oxford Park
Steve Hillier	Ward 14	Glen Cairn Woods, Pond Mills, Wilton Grove, Glanworth, Westminster

== 2022–2026 ==
Council elected in the 2022 municipal election.

Councillor	Office	Communities
Josh Morgan	Mayor	
Hadleigh McAlister	Ward 1	Hamilton Road, Chelsea Green, Fairmont, River Run, Glen Cairn
Shawn Lewis	Ward 2 Deputy Mayor	Argyle, Pottersburg, Nelson Park, Trafalgar Heights
Peter Cuddy	Ward 3	Huron Heights
Susan Stevenson	Ward 4	East London
Jerry Pribil	Ward 5	Stoneybrook, Northdale, Northeast, Uplands, Stoney Creek
Sam Trosow	Ward 6	Broughdale, University Heights, Orchard Park, Sherwood Forest
Corrine Rahman	Ward 7	White Hills, Medway Heights, Masonville, Hyde Park
Steve Lehman	Ward 8	Oakridge Park, Oakridge Acres
Anna Hopkins	Ward 9	Byron, Lambeth, Tempo
Paul Van Meerbergen	Ward 10	Westmount
Skylar Franke	Ward 11	Cleardale, Southcrest Estates, Berkshire Village, Kensal Park, Manor Park
Elizabeth Peloza	Ward 12; Budget Chair	Glendale, Southdale, Lockwood Park, White Oaks, Cleardale
David Ferreira	Ward 13	Downtown London, Midtown, Blackfriars, Piccadilly/Adelaide, SoHo, KeVa, Woodfield, Oxford Park
Steve Hillier	Ward 14	Glen Cairn Woods, Pond Mills, Wilton Grove, Jackson, Summerside, Glanworth, Westminster

== 2026–present ==
Council elected in the 2026 municipal election.

Councillor	Office	Communities
Josh Morgan	Mayor	
Hadleigh McAlister	Ward 1	Hamilton Road, Chelsea Green, Fairmont, River Run, Glen Cairn
Shawn Lewis	Ward 2 Deputy Mayor	Argyle, Pottersburg, Nelson Park, Trafalgar Heights
Ben Durham	Ward 3	Huron Heights
Tom Cull	Ward 4	East London
Corrine Rahman	Ward 5 Deputy Mayor	Stoneybrook, Northdale, Northeast, Uplands, Stoney Creek
Sam Trosow	Ward 6	Broughdale, University Heights, Orchard Park, Sherwood Forest
Jonathan Sher	Ward 7	White Hills, Medway Heights, Masonville, Hyde Park
Steve Lehman	Ward 8 Budget Chair	Oakridge Park, Oakridge Acres
Anna Hopkins	Ward 9	Byron, Lambeth, Tempo
Paul Van Meerbergen	Ward 10	Westmount
Skylar Franke	Ward 11	Cleardale, Southcrest Estates, Berkshire Village, Kensal Park, Manor Park
Elizabeth Peloza	Ward 12	Glendale, Southdale, Lockwood Park, White Oaks, Cleardale
David Ferreira	Ward 13	Downtown London, Midtown, Blackfriars, Piccadilly/Adelaide, SoHo, KeVa, Woodfield, Oxford Park
Jason King	Ward 14	Glen Cairn Woods, Pond Mills, Wilton Grove, Jackson, Summerside, Glanworth, Westminster

== City Halls ==
- 1928–1971: a four-storey building at the corner of Dundas Street and Wellington added to the Public Utilities Commission Building c. 1918; it is now a commercial building at 272-274 Dundas Street
- 1971–present: located at 300 Dufferin Avenue, a 12-storey Modernist office block built by local architect Philip Carter Johnson

== See also ==
- List of mayors of London, Ontario
