= London—Fanshawe =

London—Fanshawe could refer to:

- London—Fanshawe (federal electoral district)
- London—Fanshawe (provincial electoral district)
