= Khalil Ramal =

Canadian politician

Ontario MPP
- In office 2003–2011
- Preceded by: Frank Mazzilli
- Succeeded by: Teresa Armstrong
- Constituency: London—Fanshawe

Personal details
- Born: 1960 (age 65–66) Lebanon
- Party: Ontario Liberal Party; Liberal Party of Canada
- Occupation: Teacher, journalist

Khalil Ramal (born c. 1960) is a former politician in Ontario, Canada. He was a Liberal member of the Legislative Assembly of Ontario from 2003 to 2011. Ramal ran unsuccessfully in the 2015 federal elections, but finished second to Irene Mathyssen of the rival New Democratic Party. He ran unsuccessfully for Mayor of London in 2022, finishing second to Josh Morgan.

== Background ==
Ramal has a Bachelor of Arts degree in sociology and a Master of Arts degree in social politics from Lebanese University, and has received further diplomas in accounting and teaching. At the time of the 2003 election, he was pursuing a Ph.D. in social politics.

He arrived in Canada in 1989, after leaving war-ravaged Lebanon, and has worked as a teacher, journalist, and as a counsellor with physical and mentally disabled patients at the Oxford Regional Centre in Woodstock, Ontario. He also runs a small business, and has served as Vice President of the Orchard Farm Distribution Company.

== Politics ==
Ramal was elected for London—Fanshawe in the 2003 provincial election, defeating New Democrat Irene Mathyssen and incumbent Progressive Conservative Frank Mazzilli in a close three-way race.

On September 27, 2004, Ramal was named parliamentary assistant to Ontario Minister of Citizenship and Immigration.

He was defeated in the 2011 provincial election.

Ramal won the federal Liberal nomination for London—Fanshawe in 2015 but came in second to Irene Mathyssen of the rival New Democratic Party by a difference of around 3600 votes.

In 2022, Ramal announced that he would run for mayor of London, Ontario during the 2022 London, Ontario municipal election. Ramal was ultimately unsuccessful, losing to Josh Morgan who finished with 65.72% of the vote compared to 22.59% for Ramal.

== Electoral record ==
2022 London, Ontario mayoral election

| Mayoral Candidate | Vote | % |
|---|---|---|
| Josh Morgan | 46,283 | 65.72 |
| Khalil Ramal | 15,912 | 22.59 |
| Sandie Thomas | 2,297 | 3.26 |
| Sean O'Connell | 1,432 | 2.03 |
| Johanne Nichols | 1,339 | 1.90 |
| Daniel Jeffery | 810 | 1.15 |
| Brandon Ellis | 747 | 1.06 |
| Dan Lenart | 743 | 1.05 |
| Norman Robert Miles | 536 | 0.76 |
| Carlos Murray | 329 | 0.47 |

2015 Canadian federal election
| Party | Candidate | Votes | % | ±% | Expenditures |
|---|---|---|---|---|---|
| New Democratic | Irene Mathyssen | 20,684 | 37.78 | −12.06 | $90,397.33 |
| Liberal | Khalil Ramal | 17,214 | 31.44 | +19.41 | $47,724.86 |
| Conservative | Suzanna Dieleman | 14,891 | 27.20 | −6.72 | $57,368.78 |
| Green | Matthew Peloza | 1,604 | 2.93 | −0.05 | $1,194.57 |
| Independent | Ali Hamadi | 352 | 0.64 | – | $200.00 |
| Total valid votes/Expense limit | | 54,745 | 99.49 | | $224,287.69 |
| Total rejected ballots | | 283 | 0.51 | – | |
| Turnout | | 55,028 | 63.03 | – | |
| Eligible voters | | 87,298 | | | |
| New Democratic hold | | Swing | | −15.74 | |
Source: Elections Canada

2011 Ontario general election
| Party | Candidate | Votes | % | ±% |
|---|---|---|---|---|
| New Democratic | Teresa Armstrong | 13,953 | 40.77 | +14.53 |
| Liberal | Khalil Ramal | 9,678 | 28.28 | -10.48 |
| Progressive Conservative | Cheryl Miller | 9,075 | 26.52 | -0.95 |
| Green | Bassam Lazar | 852 | 2.49 | -4.69 |
| Libertarian | Tim Harnick | 320 | 0.93 | |
| Independent | Ali Hamadi | 192 | 0.56 | |
| Freedom | Dave Durnin | 155 | 0.45 | |
| Total valid votes | | 34,225 | 100.0 | |
| Total rejected, unmarked and declined ballots | | 218 | 0.63 | |
| Turnout | | 34,443 | 45.82 | |
| Eligible voters | | 75,165 | | |
| New Democratic gain from Liberal | | Swing | | +12.51 |
Source: Elections Ontario

2007 Ontario general election
| Party | Candidate | Votes | % | ±% |
|---|---|---|---|---|
| Liberal | Khalil Ramal | 13,814 | 38.8% | +2.9% |
| Progressive Conservative | Jim Chapman | 9,790 | 27.5% | -2.9% |
| New Democratic | Stephen Maynard | 9,351 | 26.2% | -4.9% |
| Green | Daniel O'Neail | 2,559 | 7.2% | +5.7% |
| Independent | Ma'in Sinan | 129 | 0.4% | |

2003 Ontario general election
| Party | Candidate | Votes | % | ±% |
|---|---|---|---|---|
| Liberal | Khalil Ramal | 13,920 | 35.9% | 0.8% |
| New Democratic | Irene Mathyssen | 12,051 | 31.1% | +6.4% |
| Progressive Conservative | Frank Mazzilli | 11,777 | 30.4% | -8.9% |
| Green | Bryan Smith | 568 | 1.5% | +0.9% |
| Freedom | Mike Davidson | 493 | 1.3% | +0.5% |
