= Frank Mazzilli =

Canadian politician

Ontario MPP
- In office 1999–2003
- Preceded by: first member
- Succeeded by: Khalil Ramal
- Constituency: London—Fanshawe

Personal details
- Born: December 7, 1962 (age 63) San Bartolomeo, Italy
- Party: Progressive Conservative
- Profession: Policeman

Frank Mazzilli (born December 7, 1962) is a former politician in Ontario, Canada. He was a Progressive Conservative member of the Legislative Assembly of Ontario from 1999 to 2003.

== Background ==
Mazzilli has a diploma from the Ontario Police College, and worked as a member of the police force in London, Ontario from 1982 to 1999.

== Politics ==
In the federal election of 1997, he ran as a Progressive Conservative candidate in the riding of London West, but lost to Liberal Sue Barnes by almost 14,000 votes.

He was elected to the Ontario legislature for the riding of London—Fanshawe in the provincial election of 1999, defeating Liberal Peter Mancini and New Democrat Irene Mathyssen in a close three-way race. In 2002, he served as a co-chair of the Ontario Crime Control Commission.

The Progressive Conservatives had lost much of their urban support by the time of the 2003 provincial election, and Mazzilli dropped to a third-place finish in London—Fanshawe against Mathyssen and the winner, Liberal Khalil Ramal.

His younger brother John Mazzilli ran unsuccessfully for the Conservative Party of Canada in both the 2004 and 2006 federal elections. Frank worked both times as his campaign co-chairman.
