= Sue Barnes =

Canadian politician (born 1952)

The Honourable Sue Barnes PC

Member of Parliament for London West
- In office October 25, 1993 – October 14, 2008
- Preceded by: Tom Hockin
- Succeeded by: Ed Holder

Personal details
- Born: September 8, 1952 (age 73) Rabat, Malta
- Party: Liberal
- Spouse: John Barnes
- Children: 3
- Profession: Lawyer

Susan Barnes PC (born September 8, 1952) is a former Canadian politician. Barnes represented the riding of London West from 1993 to 2008 as a Liberal member of the House of Commons of Canada. She was the first Maltese-born member of Parliament (MP). She is the longest-serving MP to represent the riding of London West and was also the first woman to be elected as a federal MP in London, Ontario.

== Early life ==
Barnes was born in Rabat, Malta, and immigrated to Canada with her family in 1957. She received bachelor's degrees in literature and law from the University of Western Ontario in 1974 and 1977, respectively. She was admitted to The Law Society of Upper Canada in 1979 and practiced law full-time until 1993.

== Political career ==
She was the Official Opposition critic for the Minister of Justice, and served as Parliamentary Secretary to the Minister of Indian Affairs and Northern Development and Federal Interlocutor for Métis and Non-Status Indians, the Minister of National Revenue and the Minister of Justice and Attorney General of Canada with special emphasis on Judicial Transparency and Aboriginal Justice.

== Electoral record ==
2008 Canadian federal election
Party	Candidate	Votes	%	±%
Conservative	Ed Holder	22556	39.09%	
Liberal	Sue Barnes	20435	35.42%	
New Democratic	Peter Ferguson	8409	14.57%	
Green	Monica Jarabek	5601	9.71%	
Progressive Canadian	Steve Hunter	443	0.77%	
Christian Heritage	Leslie Bartley	253	0.44%	
Total valid votes		–		
Total rejected ballots		–		
Turnout		–	%	

2006 Canadian federal election
Party	Candidate	Votes	%	±%
Liberal	Sue Barnes	23,019	37.9%	
Conservative	Al Gretzky	21,690	35.7%	
New Democratic	Gina Barber	13,056	21.5%	
Green	Monica Jarabek	2,900	4.8%	
Marxist–Leninist	Margaret Villamizer	59	0.1%	
Total valid votes		60,724		

2004 Canadian federal election
Party	Candidate	Votes
Liberal	Sue Barnes	25,061
Conservative	Mike Menear	17,335
New Democratic	Gina Barber	9,522
Green	Rebecca Bromwich	2,611
Progressive Canadian	Stan Winters	511
Marxist–Leninist	Margaret Villamizar	67

2000 Canadian federal election
Party	Candidate	Votes
Liberal	Sue Barnes	23,794
Alliance	Salim Mansur	10,162
Progressive Conservative	Jeff Lang	9,788
New Democratic	George Goodlet	3,596
Green	Jeremy Price	614
Canadian Action	Stan Winters	162
Marxist–Leninist	Margaret Villamizar	80

1997 Canadian federal election
Party	Candidate	Votes
Liberal	Sue Barnes	24,710
Progressive Conservative	Frank Mazzilli	10,958
Reform	Terry Biggs	8,839
New Democratic	Sandra McNee	5,291
Christian Heritage	Stan Winters	515
Green	Rachelle Small	497
Marxist–Leninist	Margaret Villamizar	83

1993 Canadian federal election
Party	Candidate	Votes
Liberal	Sue Barnes	31,084
Progressive Conservative	Tom Hockin	15,169
Reform	Todd Christensen	12,900
New Democratic	Margaret Hoff	2,551
National	Michael van Holst	1,219
Green	Heidi Strasser	401
Natural Law	Mark Hawkins	381
Christian Heritage	Ken Devries	308
Canada Party	Tom Ha	178
Independent	Ivan W. Kasiurak	111
Abolitionist	Judith Foster	33
