= Tom Gosnell =

Mayor of London, Ontario
- In office 1986–1994
- Preceded by: Martin Alphonse Gleeson
- Succeeded by: Dianne Haskett

Personal details
- Born: 1951 London, Ontario
- Died: December 8, 2014 London, Ontario
- Spouse: Laurel Strople (1986–2002)
- Relations: James Fredrick Gosnell (father)
- Children: Craig Gosnell, Jennifer Gosnell, Beth Gosnell

Thomas Charles Gosnell (1951 – December 8, 2014) was mayor of London, Ontario, Canada from December 1, 1985, to December 1, 1994. He was the son of James Fredrick Gosnell, known as "Fred", who was the mayor of London, Ontario, Canada briefly in 1972. Gosnell was London City Council's deputy mayor and budget chief from 2003 to 2010. Gosnell died at his home in London of cancer in 2014.

== Beginning years ==
Gosnell was born in London, Ontario to Fred and Evelyn Gosnell with three siblings, James, William Douglas, and sister Pamela Jane. His father, James Fredrick Gosnell was a former London police officer, alderman, and mayor and served in India and Burma with the Royal Canadian Air Force, during the Second World War.

== Introduction to politics ==
Gosnell's first exposure to municipal politics was his father's successful campaign to be alderman for Ward 6 in 1966. James Fredrick Gosnell then jumped to the Board of Control in a "secret" ballot amongst council members, then ran as mayor in 1971. Tom and his father would argue politics and later after his father's death said "we used to fight a lot about politics, we were much alike. Black was black and white was white. Unfortunately he was right 90% of the time".

Gosnell's brother Bill, his former partner in Gosnell Paving Stone, reflected in 1986 that his "younger brother was a political history buff" before he entered high school. "I suppose you can say our pop had a lot to do with shaping that, At a very early age he had taste buds for history and politics. He (Tom) gets mad when I refer to him as Joe Clark. Tom's always been controversial." His father died two months after Tom was sworn in as London's mayor in 1985.

== Youth ==
In grade 13, Gosnell was a quarterback for the Laurier Rams senior football team. He reflected in 1985 that he "hated running, and preferred game situations...when I played football the only time I ran was when a 300 pound lineman was tracking me down." Upon graduation from Laurier, Tom and Bill Gosnell played with Senior ORFU London Lords as two of the team's youngest players. "When Tom was with the Brantford Bisons (Ontario Junior Football Conference), the Hamilton Tiger-Cats asked three or 4 of them to camp." Gosnell turned down the opportunity to try out as a tight end when he wanted to be a quarterback.

== Alderman ==
Gosnell had not been short of controversy during his seven years as alderman. Marc Emery, the former owner of City Lights Book Shop, was one of the few willing to comment about the new mayor. "He was one of the worst aldermen in my experience. You couldn't get a hold of him. I had to bother and harass the guy to get him to call back," said Emery. Gosnell responded that "the point is well made." As a business person and alderman often limited the public's access to him. "There were times in the past, and I'm the first to admit it, where I didn't get back to people as quickly as I could. And in some cases I didn't get back to them at all because along the way the message got lost or whatever." Marc Emery laid another charge that "Gosnell was elected because of his good looks and his father's name. (Tom) has 3 years to prove that wrong."

== Mayoral campaign ==
At 34, Gosnell announced on September 3, 1985, at the London City Press Club that he was running for mayor. The odds seemed against him but of the six competing for the mayor's position he had the best chance. In private, his father was harbouring doubts as incumbent mayor Al Gleeson was a formidable foe. Canada had just gone through a period of high interest rates and high unemployment and there was an appetite for change. Gosnell was also as well known as many long-time politicians during the campaign as his father popularized the family name.

Gleeson had also tried to run for a federal Liberal nomination for London East when people such as Michael Coon, a salesman to Selby Young Printing stated, "We decided that Gleeson had declared his political colours and we hadn't. We could go into this (the mayoral race) apolitically."

Federally, the Progressive Conservative Party of Canada had beat the Liberal Party of Canada under John Turner in the 1984 Canadian federal election assisting any non-Liberal party at the time.

The "Gosnow" campaign started using "Gos Now!" buttons and the night before the election with Gleeson still favoured, hundreds of green lawn signs sprung up in clusters on every major street corner in London. Some claim it was the decisive turning point in the campaign. Gosnell won by 2,847 votes.

== "I'm Aggressive" ==
Gosnell reflected for the London Free Press in 1986 that his opinionated side comes from his father. During his university years when he let his hair grow long and wore peace patches on the pockets of his blue jeans, the father and son did not get along famously. In his university years Gosnell challenged authority, turning $2 parking tickets into 14-dollar summonses until one day the police arrived at his father's home on Wharncliffe Road South when Fred pulled Tom out of bed by the ankles one morning to find out why the police were at the door.

The Hamilton Tiger-Cats coach Tom Mooney also had learned what it was like to be on the receiving end of Gosnell's temper. Gosnell unleashed a verbal tirade upon learning they wanted to try him out as a tight end and not a quarterback. The explanation was "rich in locker room vernacular lest there was any ambiguity in his position." "He was so blunt about it that it was very easy to be blunt back to him." Gosnell said "I realized at the time that I probably didn't have the ability to go on as a pro ball player, so it was a lot easier to do it." He then decided to run as mayor having reached his pinnacle of quarterback in semi-pro.

When he became mayor and until this day he still speaks his mind and when asked what he considered his most outstanding qualification to be mayor, he responded "I'm aggressive."

== Mayor's vision ==
Gosnell's objective was to get the city on an aggressive approach to improving downtown. He had bought a rooming house and began to convert it back to a single-family dwelling. He spoke of how "we have streetscapes and facades downtown that are fantastic, We've got to do whatever we can to preserve them. We are strong enough as a city to turn to major developers who own major blocks downtown and say we are not going to go bankrupt with or without your development, so you will never find the city in the position (where) we're going to come crawling to you. We can do very well downtown if we just restore and rebuild what we have there now. We obviously want major developers to do things downtown but we're not in a situation of a Brantford or a Chatham, where our economies are falling apart. Our economy is very strong. We can make a major improvement downtown with or without their multi-million dollar votes. We want (developers). We encourage them. We also want them to understand it's a two-way street."

== See also ==
- List of mayors of London, Ontario
