= Dianne Haskett =

Canadian lawyer and politician

Mayor of London, Ontario
- In office 1994–2000
- Preceded by: Tom Gosnell
- Succeeded by: Anne Marie DeCicco-Best

Personal details
- Born: March 4, 1955 (age 70)
- Political party: Conservative

Dianne Louise Haskett (born March 4, 1955) is a Canadian lawyer, politician, and diplomat who served as the mayor of London, Ontario, Canada, serving from 1994 to 2000, and later ran unsuccessfully as the Conservative candidate in the 2006 federal by-election in the riding of London North Centre, placing third. She served two three-year mayoral terms, making a priority of downtown revitalization, heritage preservation, economic development, neighbourhood protection, protecting the environment, international relations, trade corridors' infrastructure, family values and anti-poverty initiatives.

== Early years ==
Haskett was born and raised in London's Kensal Park district north of Springbank Drive.

== Education ==
Haskett earned her B.A. from the University of Waterloo in 1974, her LL.B. from the University of Western Ontario in 1977, her LL.M. from the London School of Economics in 1979 and a second LLM from The George Washington University Law School in 2005. She has also studied law at Case Western Reserve University in Cleveland, Ohio, and the Institute for Advanced Legal Studies at Cambridge University, England.

She later founded her own law firm, Haskett Menear & Associates, which grew to include seven lawyers.

== Mayor ==
From 1991 to 1994, Haskett was a member of London's elected board of control on city council.

Once Haskett was elected mayor in November 1994, defeating Deputy Mayor Jack Burghardt by slightly more than 1,000 votes, she stepped aside from her duties as a lawyer and as a partner in her law firm. She was re-elected in 1997 with a landslide victory.

=== Proclamation controversy ===
In 1995, Dianne Haskett refused to issue a Gay Pride Proclamation on the basis that she'd previously formulated a policy of declining controversial proclamations. London City Council also declined to issue the Gay Pride Proclamation by a vote of 13-5 (Mayor Haskett abstained from voting).

Richard Hudler, president of the Homophile Association of London, Ontario (HALO), filed an official complaint with the Ontario Human Rights Commission in 1995, a tribunal of which ultimately determined in 1997 after a three-day public hearing that the City of London and Mayor Haskett had discriminated against HALO in the provision of a municipal service. Both the City of London and Haskett were fined $5,000.

Haskett placed a paid advertisement in The London Free Press on October 22, 1997, in which she stated that she believed the human rights case was unfairly decided and wrong in fact and law, and that the Tribunal's decision undermined the freedoms guaranteed in the Canadian Constitution, notably freedom of expression and freedom of religion.

As an act of protest, she withdrew from her duties as mayor for three weeks (without pay) by staying in her Port Stanley, Ontario, townhouse and did not campaign during the last three weeks of the 1997 election. Deputy Mayor Grant Hopcroft, who became acting mayor during her absence, became an ardent supporter of issuing the gay pride proclamation after opposing it in 1995 in a recorded vote and refused to allow an appeal of the tribunal decision. Haskett was re-elected to a second term as mayor by a 2-1 landslide over Hopcroft. Haskett used no campaign signs during the 1997 civic election, instead using green-and-gold ribbons.

In 1996, Haskett was invited to bring greetings at an evangelical Christian rally in London called the "March of Jesus". One of the speakers was Rev. Miguel Sanchez of the London Gospel Temple, who prayed for deliverance "from the darkness and deception of the spirit of Islam". Haskett bowed her head during the prayer, and later said, "From what I know of him, I believed Rev. Sanchez and all other participants have a great love for all people". She later described Sanchez's comments as unfortunate. Haskett's role in this event was strongly criticized at the time by some members of London's Muslim community. In an effort to make sure that Londoners of all faiths felt appreciated and respected in the city, Haskett participated in a March for Tolerance from downtown to the London Muslim Mosque on Oxford Street West, where community leaders, including Haskett, addressed the crowd. She thanked the Muslim community for the many positive contributions they made to the city and urged people of all faiths to show love and respect for one another.

== Moves to Washington, D.C. ==
Haskett's second, three-year term as mayor ended in December 2000 after she decided not to run again for re-election. She was succeeded by deputy mayor Anne Marie DeCicco-Best. Haskett, her husband and daughter moved to Fairfax, Virginia, working with two D.C. area law firms in planning and implementing strategic business development and providing assistance in their immigration and estate planning work.

Haskett completed her second Master's Law Degree in the Spring of 2005 from The George Washington University Law School in Washington, D.C. She also passed the Washington D.C. Bar exam and was sworn in as an attorney and member of the D.C. Bar in December, 2005.

Haskett has also been involved in a number of other projects in the Washington, D.C. area, including speechwriting, research and marketing and acting in an advisory capacity in Senate and Congressional campaigns. She volunteered as a communications adviser and researcher for Republican Senator Elizabeth Dole. She sat as a member of the board of trustees for the International Center for Religion & Diplomacy in Washington, D.C. and of Trinity Christian School of Fairfax, Virginia.

== 2006 federal by-election ==
On October 17, 2006, 1290 CJBK-AM, a London, Ontario radio station, and the A-Channel reported that Dianne Haskett had returned to London to seek the Conservative Party of Canada nomination in the London North Centre federal riding recently vacated by former Liberal MP Joe Fontana, who was a candidate for mayor of London in civic election 2006. This information was confirmed by Haskett on October 18, 2006.

On October 24, Haskett defeated Tom Weihmayr for the Conservative nomination in the federal riding of London North Centre. Haskett was widely considered to be the choice of the party hierarchy. The local riding association was ordered to hold the nomination meeting on October 24, 2006, a decision Haskett was informed of before the riding association was.

Key members of Haskett's campaign team were campaign manager Ryan Sparrow (previously the communications director for Environment Minister Rona Ambrose), former law firm partner Michael Menear, former member of London city council Ted Wernham, London businessperson Randy Collins, and Dale Mackness.

Voting day for the federal by-election was November 27, 2006. With 253 of 253 polls reporting, the official by-election results from Elections Canada are as follows:

- 38,123 of 89,139 registered electors voted (42.8 per-cent turnout)

Canadian federal by-election, November 27, 2006: London North Centre Resignation of Joe Fontana
Party	Candidate	Votes	%	±%
Liberal	Glen Pearson	13,287	34.85	−5.27
Green	Elizabeth May	9,864	25.87	+20.38
Conservative	Dianne Haskett	9,309	24.42	−5.48
New Democratic	Megan Walker	5,388	14.13	−9.62
Progressive Canadian	Steven Hunter	145	0.38	−0.09
Independent	Robert Ede	77	0.20	–
Canadian Action	Will Arlow	53	0.14	–
Total		38,123	100.00	

== Haskett returns to Washington ==
A letter to Londoners appears on Haskett's "information [Web] site" dated December 28, 2006, which says that she is returning to Washington, D.C. to be with her husband Jack and to continue her life there.

== See also ==
- List of mayors of London, Ontario
- List of University of Waterloo people
