= Thomas C. Dixon =

Canadian politician

Thomas C. Dixon (died 1870s) was a hatter and political figure in Canada West. He represented London in the Legislative Assembly of the Province of Canada from 1851 to 1854. Dixon served as mayor of London in 1849.

He defeated John Wilson to win a seat in the assembly in 1851; Dixon was defeated by Wilson when he ran for reelection in 1854. Shortly after this defeat, Dixon moved to Hamilton, where he served on city council. Originally an Anglican, he became a Mormon. In 1854, Dixon moved to Utah, taking with him the wives of five other city councillors. He died of yellow fever in Fort Worth, Texas sometime in the 1870s.
