= London—Fanshawe (provincial electoral district) =

Provincial electoral district in Ontario, Canada

Coordinates: 43.00°N 81.18°W

Ontario electoral district
- Location in London

Provincial electoral district
- Legislature: Legislative Assembly of Ontario
MPP
Teresa Armstrong
New Democratic
- District created: 1996
- First contested: 1999
- Last contested: 2025

Demographics
- Population (2016): 119,470
- Electors (2018): 92,428
- Area (km²): 118
- Pop. density (per km²): 1,012.5
- Census division: Middlesex
- Census subdivision: London

London—Fanshawe is a provincial electoral district in Ontario, Canada, that has been represented in the Legislative Assembly of Ontario since 1999.

== Geography ==
The district consists of the southeast part of the city of London.

Specifically, it consists of the part of the city lying east and north of a line drawn from the northern limit of the city south along Highbury Avenue North, west along the Thames River (South Branch), south along the Canadian National Railway, west along Commissioners Road East, south along Wharncliffe Road South, east along Southdale Road East, south along White Oak Road, east along Exeter Road, north along Meg Drive, west along Jalna Boulevard, north along Ernest Avenue, east along Bradley Avenue, north along Highbury Avenue South, east along Arran Place and Bradley Avenue to the eastern limit of the city.

== History ==
The riding was created in 1996 from parts of London Centre and Middlesex. It consisted initially of the part of the City of London lying east and north of a line drawn from the northern limit of the city south along Highbury Avenue and Highway 126, west along the Thames River, south along the Canadian National Railway tracks, west along Commissioners Road East, south along Wharncliffe Road South, east along Southdale Road East, south along White Oak Road, east along Exeter Road, north along Meg Drive, west along Jalna Boulevard, north along Ernest Avenue, east along Bradley Avenue, north along the Highbury Avenue, east along Arran Place and Bradley Avenue to the eastern limit of the city.

In 2003, it was given its current boundaries as described above.

The provincial electoral district was created in 1999 when provincial ridings were defined to have the same borders as federal ridings.

== Members of Provincial Parliament ==
This riding has elected the following members of the Legislative Assembly of Ontario:

London—Fanshawe
Assembly	Years	Member	Party
Riding created from London Centre and Middlesex
37th	1999–2003	Frank Mazzilli	Progressive Conservative
38th	2003–2007	Khalil Ramal	Liberal
39th	2007–2011	Khalil Ramal	Liberal
40th	2011–2014	Teresa Armstrong	New Democratic
41st	2014–2018	Teresa Armstrong	New Democratic
42nd	2018–2022	Teresa Armstrong	New Democratic
43rd	2022–2025	Teresa Armstrong	New Democratic
44th	2025–present	Teresa Armstrong	New Democratic

== Election results ==
Winning party in each polling division of London—Fanshawe at the 2025 Ontario general election

2025 Ontario general election
Party	Candidate	Votes	%	±%	Expenditures
New Democratic	Teresa Armstrong	18,749	47.59	+0.53	$36,830
Progressive Conservative	Pete Vanderley	13,480	34.21	+1.45	$52,737
Liberal	Kevin May	4,884	12.40	+2.03	$13,998
Green	William Osbourne-Sorrell	1,045	2.65	–0.85	$1,424
New Blue	Christopher West	654	1.66	–1.47	$0
Freedom	Dave Durnin	381	0.97	+0.24	$0
Independent	Alan John McDonald	205	0.52	–	$0
Total valid votes/expense limit		39,398	99.39	–	$154,647
Total rejected, unmarked and declined ballots		242	0.61	–0.05	
Turnout		39,640	41.27	+4.71	
Eligible voters		96,054			
New Democratic hold		Swing		–0.46	
Source: Elections Ontario

Winning party in each polling division of London—Fanshawe at the 2022 Ontario general election

2022 Ontario general election
Party	Candidate	Votes	%	±%	Expenditures
New Democratic	Teresa Armstrong	16,123	47.06	–8.62	$98,540
Progressive Conservative	Jane Kovarikova	11,224	32.76	+2.98	$94,579
Liberal	Zeba Hashmi	3,553	10.37	+2.01	$38,320
Green	Zack Ramsey	1,200	3.50	–1.01	$0
New Blue	Adriana A. Medina	1,072	3.13	–	$3,647
Ontario Party	Doug Macdonald	539	1.57	–	$780
Freedom	Dave Durnin	248	0.72	+0.23	$0
None of the Above	Stephen R. Campbell	201	0.59	–0.10	$0
Consensus Ontario	T. Paul Plumb	100	0.29	–	$0
Total valid votes/expense limit		34,260	99.34	–	$132,738
Total rejected, unmarked and declined ballots		228	0.66	–0.43	
Turnout		34,488	36.56	–13.10	
Eligible voters		94,342			
New Democratic hold		Swing		–5.80	
Source: Elections Ontario

2018 Ontario general election
Party	Candidate	Votes	%	±%
New Democratic	Teresa Armstrong	25,272	55.68	+5.26
Progressive Conservative	Eric Weniger	13,519	29.78	+6.70
Liberal	Lawvin Hadisi	3,797	8.37	–11.53
Green	Lisa Carriere	2,050	4.52	+0.64
None of the Above	Stephen R. Campbell	312	0.69	–
Freedom	Rob Small	223	0.49	–0.82
Libertarian	Henryk Szymczyszyn	218	0.48	–0.61
Total valid votes		45,391	98.90	
Total rejected, unmarked and declined ballots		503	1.10	–0.23
Turnout		45,894	49.65	+3.23
Eligible voters		92,428		
New Democratic hold		Swing		–0.72
Source: Elections Ontario

2014 Ontario general election
Party	Candidate	Votes	%	±%
New Democratic	Teresa Armstrong	17,903	50.42	+9.65
Progressive Conservative	Chris Robson	8,196	23.08	–3.43
Liberal	Marcel Marcellin	7,066	19.90	–8.38
Green	Wil Sorrell	1,378	3.88	+1.39
Freedom	Paul McKeever	467	1.32	+0.86
Libertarian	Tim Harnick	386	1.09	+0.15
Independent	Ali Aref Hamadi	112	0.32	–0.25
Total valid votes		35,508	98.67	
Total rejected, unmarked and declined ballots		478	1.33	+0.70
Turnout		35,986	46.42	+0.60
Eligible voters		77,524		
New Democratic hold		Swing		+6.54
Source: Elections Ontario

2011 Ontario general election
Party	Candidate	Votes	%	±%
New Democratic	Teresa Armstrong	13,953	40.77	+14.45
Liberal	Khalil Ramal	9,678	28.28	–10.40
Progressive Conservative	Cheryl Miller	9,075	26.52	–0.95
Green	Bassam Lazar	852	2.49	–4.68
Libertarian	Tim Harnick	320	0.93	–
Independent	Ali Aref Hamadi	192	0.56	–
Freedom	Dave Durnin	155	0.45	–
Total valid votes		34,225	99.37	
Total rejected, unmarked and declined ballots		218	0.63	–0.04
Turnout		34,443	45.82	–2.39
Eligible voters		75,165		
New Democratic gain from Liberal		Swing		+7.70
Source: Elections Ontario

2007 Ontario general election
Party	Candidate	Votes	%	±%
Liberal	Khalil Ramal	13,742	38.68	+2.81
Progressive Conservative	Jim Chapman	9,760	27.47	–2.88
New Democratic	Stephen Maynard	9,350	26.32	–4.74
Green	Daniel O'Neail	2,548	7.17	+5.71
Independent	Ma'in Sinan	129	0.36	–
Total valid votes		35,529	99.33	
Total rejected, unmarked and declined ballots		240	0.67	–0.13
Turnout		35,769	48.21	–4.24
Eligible voters		74,193		
Liberal hold		Swing		+2.84
Source: Elections Ontario

2003 Ontario general election
Party	Candidate	Votes	%	±%
Liberal	Khalil Ramal	13,920	35.87	+0.83
New Democratic	Irene Mathyssen	12,051	31.05	+6.40
Progressive Conservative	Frank Mazzilli	11,777	30.35	–8.18
Green	Bryan Smith	568	1.46	+0.86
Freedom	Mike Davidson	493	1.27	+0.53
Total valid votes		38,809	99.19	
Total rejected, unmarked and declined ballots		315	0.81	–0.38
Turnout		39,124	52.45	–2.62
Eligible voters		74,594		
Liberal gain from Progressive Conservative		Swing		+4.51
Source: Elections Ontario

1999 Ontario general election
Party	Candidate	Votes	%
Progressive Conservative	Frank Mazzilli	15,295	38.53
Liberal	Peter Mancini	13,912	35.04
New Democratic	Irene Mathyssen	9,788	24.65
Freedom	Lloyd Walker	293	0.74
Green	Heidi Strasser	241	0.61
Natural Law	Wanda Beaver	172	0.43
Total valid votes		39,701	98.81
Total rejected, unmarked and declined ballots		477	1.19
Turnout		40,178	55.07
Eligible voters		72,960	
Progressive Conservative pickup new district.			
Source: Elections Ontario

== 2007 electoral reform referendum ==
2007 Ontario electoral reform referendum
Side	Votes	
First Past the Post	21,023	62.8
Mixed member proportional	12,442	37.2
Total valid votes	33,465	100.0

== See also ==
- List of Ontario provincial electoral districts
- Canadian provincial electoral districts
