= Jim Chapman (media personality) =

Canadian radio and TV personality, musician, journalist and author

Jim Chapman (born February 10, 1949) is a Canadian radio and TV personality, musician, journalist and author.

== Personal life ==
Jim Chapman was born in London, Ontario, Canada on February 10, 1949, and has at various times in his career been a recording artist, studio and road musician, businessman, radio and TV talk show host, newspaper and magazine columnist, published author, lecturer, and keynote motivational speaker.

He was married in 1979 to Carlyn Greenham. They have no children, but a large extended family.

== Career ==
Chapman dropped out of school in 1966 to pursue a career as an entertainer. In 1968 his band, The Bluesmen Revue, signed a recording contract with Columbia Records in the U.S. that saw the release of "Spin the Bottle". The group split up in early 1969 because of dissatisfaction with the plans Columbia and their U.S. management had for them. In 1970, Chapman joined legendary Canadian lounge showband Leather and Lace and later played with rockabilly legend Ronnie Hawkins in 1972.

In 1973, Chapman and partners started a musician management company and opened Springfield Sound Studios, where, among many others, Canadian folk icon Stan Rogers recorded his classic albums Turnaround and Fogarty's Cove.

After having toured with his own band for several years, in 1986 Chapman returned home to London and built another recording studio/jingle company. Among many commercial projects he wrote and recorded the "Tear 'Em Up Tigers" theme song for the London-based Detroit Tigers farm team that got international media coverage as the team fought its way to a US Eastern League baseball championship in 1989.

In 1988, Chapman was contracted to write novelty songs for Peter Garland's top-rated morning show on CFPL 980 Radio. Some of his songs were heard also across Canada on the CBC, including "Stand Up for Canada, Eh!", recorded by the True Grit Band that at times included Canadian Prime Minister Jean Chrétien and National Liberal Caucus Chair and future City of London Mayor Joe Fontana, plus other government members. It was used as the theme song for a nationwide federal campaign to promote Canadian unity during the 1990's.

In 1992, Chapman was offered a job as a talk show host at London's CJBK Radio and later moved his show to CKSL for two tears before returning to CJBK. He was later hired as a news commentator on CFPL television and also hosted the thrice-weekly Jim Chapman Show interview show evenings on the Rogers TV Network for several years. He was a columnist with The London Free Press and Business London magazine for two decades, and was the first person in London media to host his own radio and TV shows while also writing regular newspaper and magazine columns. In the 2000s he hosted radio talk shows on CFPL and CHRW before retiring from the media in 2013.

In 2007 Chapman had an unsuccessful run in the Ontario Provincial Election for the Progressive Conservatives.

Between 2000 and 2023, Chapman wrote and saw published nine books of fiction and non-fiction, including his latest, a 210,000-word, 940-picture coffee table volume, "Battle of the Bands", the definitive history of teen music in London (and beyond) in the 50s and 60s that also included funny stories of his own life as a musician from then until now. It was well-received and is now in its third printing.

In 2023 Chapman was inducted into the London Music Hall of Fame along with his fellow 1960's Bluesmen Revue band members.

In 2025, he was recognized as a "Distinguished Londoner" on the Mayor's New years Honours List for his long musical and media career, 2023 book on London history, decades of charity fundraising, and ongoing work with London's seniors community.

In addition to being a popular entertainer at retirement residences, in 2024 Chapman began hosting a weekly concert series for seniors that features top local and area performers.

== Near-death experience ==
In 1999, Chapman suffered a fatal heart attack and was left brain-dead in a local ER. He was eventually resuscitated, but not before having a near-death experience. Emergency surgery after a second serious heart attack just days later left him very ill and incapacitated for several months. He used the time to tell the story of what he called his "adventure" in a book, Heart and Soul, that became a regional bestseller and generated thousands of dollars for charity. For the next few years, in addition to his media work, Chapman travelled extensively, speaking about his near-death experience and its aftermath.

After a serious illness in 2005, Chapman was inspired to write another book, Come Back to Life, that related the story of the years since his near-death experience and how his life in the interim had been affected by it.
