= Ed Holder =

Canadian politician (born 1954)

The Honourable Ed Holder PC

64th Mayor of London
- In office December 1, 2018 – November 14, 2022
- Preceded by: Matt Brown
- Succeeded by: Josh Morgan

Minister of State for Science and Technology
- In office March 19, 2014 – August 4, 2015
- Prime Minister: Stephen Harper
- Preceded by: Greg Rickford
- Succeeded by: Kirsty Duncan

Member of Parliament for London West
- In office October 14, 2008 – October 19, 2015
- Preceded by: Sue Barnes
- Succeeded by: Kate Young

Personal details
- Born: Edwin Anthony Holder; July 14, 1954 (age 71) Toronto, Ontario, Canada
- Party: Independent
- Other political affiliations: Conservative (Federal); Progressive Conservative (Provincial)
- Profession: Politician

Edwin Anthony Holder PC (born July 14, 1954) is a retired Canadian politician who served as the 64th mayor of London from 2018 to 2022. He was previously the federal Member of Parliament for London West from 2008 to 2015 as a member of the Conservative Party.

== Political career ==
In the 1993 Canadian federal election, Holder stood as the Progressive Conservative candidate in London—Middlesex losing to Pat O'Brien.

He was elected to the House of Commons in the 2008 Canadian federal election in London West.

On March 19, 2014, Holder was appointed Minister of State (Science and Technology) and sworn in as a member of the Queen's Privy Council for Canada.

On October 19, 2015, Holder was defeated in the Canadian federal election, losing in the riding of London West to Kate Young.

In October 2017, Holder announced that he was seeking the Progressive Conservative Party of Ontario nomination in London West for the 42nd Ontario general election. In January 2018, he withdrew from the nomination contest.

On July 12, 2018, Holder declared his candidacy for the mayoralty of London, Ontario to be decided during the 2018 municipal election. On October 23, 2018, Holder was elected mayor, winning on the 14th round of counting in the city's and Canada's first-ever ranked ballot municipal election.

Holder was mayor of London during the aftermath following the London, Ontario truck attack on June 6, 2021. He attended a large memorial for the family who were killed in the attack. The memorial was one of the largest such gatherings in Ontario since the COVID-19 pandemic in Ontario had begun. In May 2022, he announced that he would not run for a second term as mayor and that he would be retiring from politics. During the 2022 mayoral election campaign, Holder endorsed Deputy Mayor Josh Morgan. Morgan would go on to win the mayoral election on October 24, 2022 after capturing 65% of the vote.

== Electoral record ==
=== Mayoral race ===
London, Ontario mayoral election, 2018
Candidate	% 1st Pref	Count 1	Count 2	Count 3	Count 4	Count 5	Count 6	Count 7	Count 8	Count 9	Count 10	Count 11	Count 12	Count 13	Count 14
Ed Holder	34.2	33,042	33,056	33,073	33,101	33,135	33,183	33,240	33,280	33,325	33,391	33,543	38,690	44,373	57,609
Paul Paolatto	22.2	21,456	21,464	21,471	21,487	21,516	21,541	21,579	21,604	21,637	21,675	21,856	25,943	31,061	
Tanya Park	20.3	19,656	19,676	19,690	19,740	19,781	19,801	19,828	19,960	20,071	20,199	20,434	22,415		
Paul Cheng	19.8	19,161	19,175	19,190	19,211	19,238	19,254	19,329	19,362	19,396	19,442	19,616			
Mohamed Moussa	1.0	919	922	925	933	949	1,023	1,035	1,043	1,063	1,077				
Sean M. O'Connell	0.4	370	372	380	389	401	406	416	442	483					
David Millie	0.3	337	343	347	358	380	385	391	401						
Nina McCutcheon	0.4	340	344	351	361	364	375	384							
Vahide Bahramporian	0.4	348	351	351	357	363	368								
Ali Hamadi	0.3	304	304	304	306	311									
Dan Lenart	0.3	255	258	263	275										
Jordan Minter	0.2	212	217	224											
Carlos Murray	0.1	127	131												
Jonas White	0.1	111													
Electorate: 244,962 Valid: 96,638 Spoilt: 1,297 Quota: 48,320 Turnout: 40.0%

=== Federal races ===
2015 Canadian federal election: London West
Party	Candidate	Votes	%	±%	Expenditures
Liberal	Kate Young	31,167	45.8	+19.07	–
Conservative	Ed Holder	24,306	35.3	−9.77	–
New Democratic	Matthew Rowlinson	10,087	14.8	−10.62	–
Green	Dimitri Lascaris	1,918	2.8	+0.12	–
Libertarian	Jacques Y. Boudreau	732	1.1	–	–
Communist	Michael Lewis	87	0.1	–	–
Total valid votes/Expense limit		68,027	100.0		$234,017.17
Total rejected ballots		286	–	–	
Turnout		68,313	73.9%	–	
Eligible voters		92,326			
Liberal gain from Conservative		Swing		+14.42	
Source: Elections Canada

2011 Canadian federal election: London West
Party	Candidate	Votes	%	±%	Expenditures
Conservative	Ed Holder	27,675	44.49	+5.40	–
Liberal	Doug Ferguson	16,652	26.77	-8.64	–
New Democratic	Peter Ferguson	16,109	25.90	+11.33	–
Green	Brad Arthur Corbett	1,703	2.74	-7.01	–
United	Rod Morley	65	0.10	–	–
Total valid votes		62,204	100.00	–	
Total rejected ballots		273	0.44	+0.08	–
Turnout		62,477	67.49	+4.35	
Eligible voters		92,572	–	–	

2008 Canadian federal election: London West
Party	Candidate	Votes	%	±%
Conservative	Ed Holder	22556	39.09%	
Liberal	Sue Barnes	20435	35.42%	
New Democratic	Peter Ferguson	8409	14.57%	
Green	Monica Jarabek	5601	9.71%	
Progressive Canadian	Steve Hunter	443	0.77%	
Christian Heritage	Leslie Bartley	253	0.44%	
Total valid votes		–		
Total rejected ballots		–		
Turnout		–	%	
