= Simeon Morrill =

Canadian politician

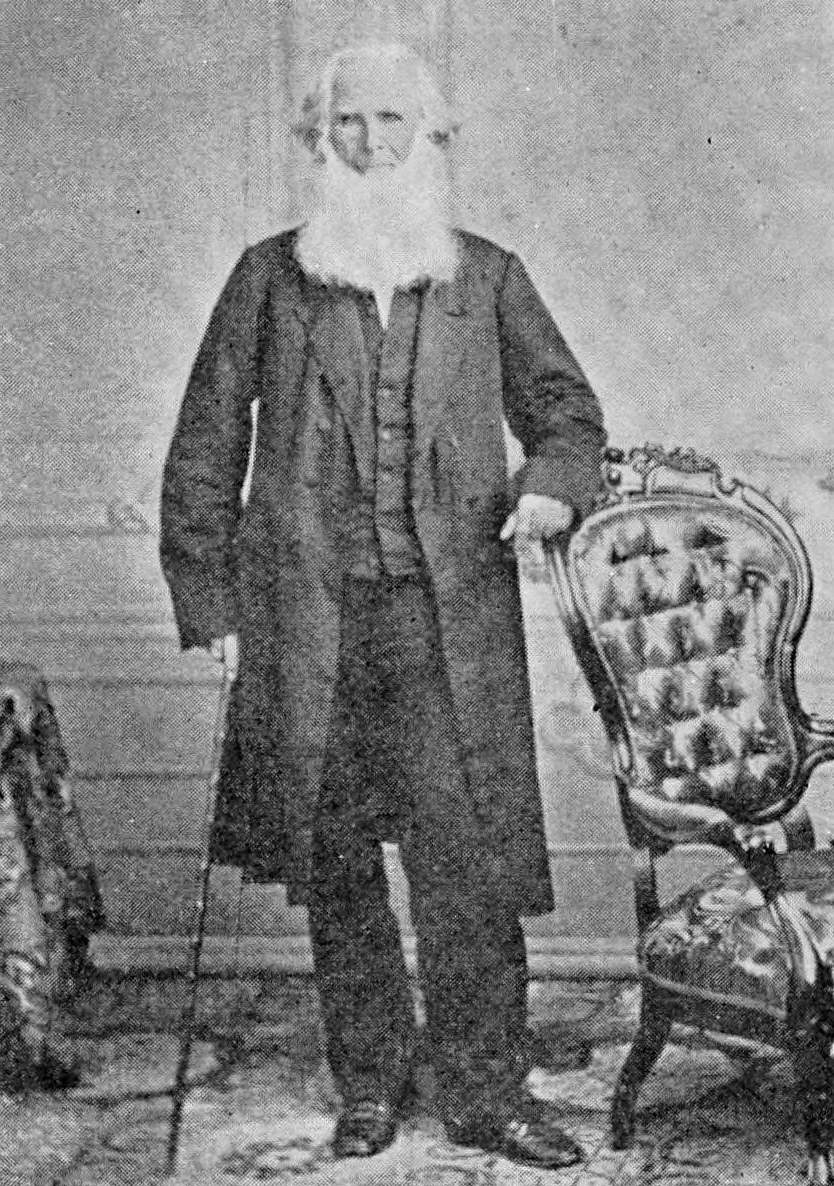
Morrill in an undated photograph

Simeon Morrill (August 11, 1793 – June 20, 1871) was an American-born businessman and politician in Ontario, Canada. He served as mayor of London in 1848 and from 1850 to 1851.

He was born in Vermont and grew up in Maine. Morrill worked as a tanner in Kingston, Upper Canada and came to London in 1829, setting up a tannery there. His business grew to include a shoe and boot factory, but in 1868 he was forced to declare insolvency. Morrill was a trustee of the London Savings’ Bank, a trustee of the London Gas Company and a director of the London and Port Stanley Railway. He was also a founding member of the London Board of Trade. In 1841, he was named a justice of the peace.

In 1844, Morrill was an unsuccessful candidate in a by-election for the London seat in the Legislative Assembly of the Province of Canada, losing to Lawrence Lawrason. He represented St Andrew's ward on London town council for a number of years and was the town's first mayor.

Morrill was also active in the local temperance society. He was married twice: first to Margaret Andrews and later to Eleanor Beach. He died in London at the age of 77.
