= 2022 London, Ontario, municipal election =

Canadian municipal election

2022 London municipal election
- October 24, 2022
- Turnout: 25.50%
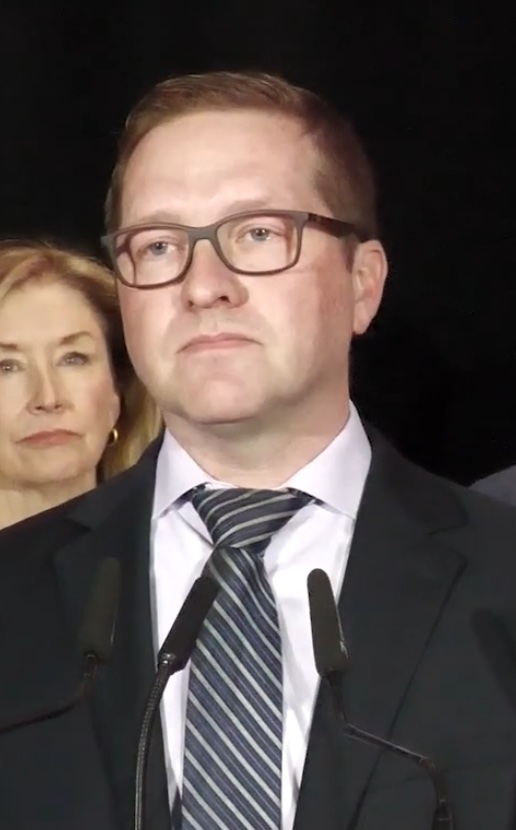
		KR
Candidate	Josh Morgan	Khalil Ramal
Popular vote	46,283	15,912
Percentage	65.72%	22.59%
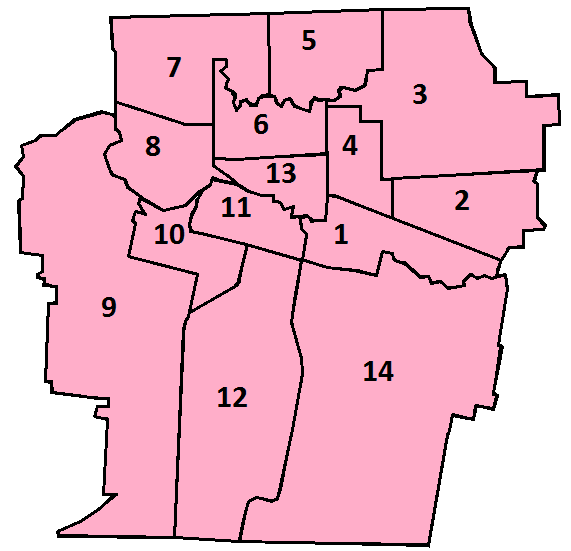
- Map of London's 14 wards
Mayor before election
Ed Holder
Independent
Elected mayor
Josh Morgan
Independent

The 2022 London municipal election was a municipal election that occurred on October 24, 2022, in conjunction with municipal elections being held across the province.

Deputy Mayor and Ward 7 Councillor Josh Morgan defeated former Liberal MPP for London-Fanshawe Khalil Ramal by an overwhelming majority to become the 65th mayor of London.

== Electoral system ==
After using ranked ballots in the 2018 municipal election, London returned to using the first past the post electoral system after the passing of the Supporting Ontario's Recovery and Municipal Elections Act, 2020 by the Government of Ontario, which removed the right of municipalities to use a different electoral system from FPTP.

The candidates who registered to run for London City Council are as follows:

== Mayor ==
Incumbent mayor Ed Holder did not run for a second term, announcing on May 24 that he was retiring from politics. Two days later, deputy mayor Josh Morgan announced he was running for the position. He was endorsed by Holder. On June 27, former Liberal MPP Khalil Ramal announced he would run for mayor. On the final day of registration, August 19, well-known local pastor Sandie Thomas entered the race. Social media personality Dylan Wallace attempted to join the race, but did not register before the deadline to be on the ballot.

Mayoral Candidate	Vote	%
Josh Morgan	46,283	65.72
Khalil Ramal	15,912	22.59
Sandie Thomas	2,297	3.26
Sean O'Connell	1,432	2.03
Johanne Nichols	1,339	1.90
Daniel Jeffery	810	1.15
Brandon Ellis	747	1.06
Dan Lenart	743	1.05
Norman Robert Miles	536	0.76
Carlos Murray	329	0.47

== London City Council ==
=== Ward 1 ===
Candidate	Vote	%
Hadleigh McAlister	1,415	37.71
Michael Van Holst (X)	1,053	28.07
Ken Fischer	420	11.19
Julie Reynolds	358	9.54
Ryan Cadden	174	4.64
Janette Cameron	169	4.50
Shirley Wilton	73	1.95
Oberon Goodden	48	1.28
Kenneth Saunders	42	1.12

=== Ward 2 ===
Candidate	Vote	%
Shawn Lewis (X)	3,310	88.76
Mike Yohnicki	419	11.24

=== Ward 3 ===
Candidate	Vote	%
Peter Cuddy	1,433	36.17
Bob Wright	1,026	25.90
Prabh Gill	774	19.54
Ainsley Graham	592	14.94
Saifullah Qasimi	137	3.46

=== Ward 4 ===
Candidate	Vote	%
Susan Stevenson	1,064	28.34
Jarad Fisher	769	20.48
Colleen Murphy	684	18.22
Matt Nicolaidis	681	18.14
Stephen Orser	365	9.72
Sylvia Nagy	129	3.44
Raymond Daamen	63	1.68

=== Ward 5 ===
Candidate	Vote	%
Jerry Pribil	3,982	64.52
Connor Pierotti	2,190	35.48

=== Ward 6 ===
Candidate	Vote	%
Samuel Trosow	2,082	48.11
Mariam Hamou (X)	1,783	41.20
Becky Williamson	463	10.70

=== Ward 7 ===
Candidate	Vote	%
Corrine Rahman	3,910	54.96
Tommy Caldwell	2,163	30.40
Sharon Deebrah	577	8.11
Evan Wee	464	6.52

=== Ward 8 ===
Candidate	Vote	%
Steve Lehman (X)	3,669	69.55
Colleen McCauley	838	15.89
Sarvarinder Singh Dohil	542	10.27
Patrick O'Connor	226	4.28

=== Ward 9 ===
Candidate	Vote	%
Anna Hopkins (X)	4,281	62.07
Mario Jozic	1,569	22.75
Baqar Khan	376	5.45
Jacob Novick	348	5.05
Veronica Warner	323	4.68

=== Ward 10 ===
Candidate	Vote	%
Paul Van Meerbergen (X)	2,400	41.93
Kevin May	1,461	25.52
John Kuypers	992	17.33
Claire Grant	653	11.41
Michael McMullen	218	3.81

=== Ward 11 ===
Candidate	Vote	%
Skylar Franke	3,616	57.68
Jeremy McCall	1,731	27.61
Christine Oliver	553	8.82
Paul-Michael Anderson	267	4.26
Cole Fobert	102	1.63

=== Ward 12 ===
Candidate	Vote	%
Elizabeth Peloza (X)	3,400	77.15
David Godwin	541	12.28
Alexander Main	466	10.57

=== Ward 13 ===
Candidate	Vote	%
David Ferreira	1,885	41.23
John Fyfe-Millar (X)	1,851	40.49
David Millie	487	10.65
Alexandria Hames	349	7.63

=== Ward 14 ===
Candidate	Vote	%
Steve Hillier (X)	1,766	45.99
Sarah Lehman	1,538	40.05
Danalynn Williams	536	13.96

Preceded by 2018 election	List of London, Ontario municipal elections	Succeeded by 2026 election
