= Joe Judge (footballer) =

Scottish footballer (born 1947)

Personal information
- Full name: Joseph Judge
- Date of birth: 1 July 1947 (age 79)
- Place of birth: Monklands, Scotland
- Position: Outside right

Youth career
- Jordanhill Training College

Senior career*
Years	Team	Apps	(Gls)
1969	Queen's Park	7	(0)

International career
1969	Scotland Amateurs	1	(0)
- * Club domestic league appearances and goals

Joseph Judge (born 1 July 1947) is a Scottish former amateur footballer who played as an outside right in the Scottish League for Queen's Park. He was capped by Scotland at amateur level.
