= List of mayors of London, Ontario =

Mayor of London
- Flag of London
- Incumbent; Josh Morgan since November 15, 2022
- Style: His Worship; Mayor (informal)
- Member of: London City Council
- Reports to: London City Council
- Residence: London
- Seat: London City Hall
- Appointer: Directly elected by residents of London
- Term length: Four years, renewable
- Inaugural holder: Simeon Morrill
- Formation: 1848; 178 years ago
- Salary: CA$104,258 (2013)
- Website: Mayor's Office

The mayor of London is head of London City Council. The 65th and current mayor of the city is Josh Morgan. London was incorporated as a town in 1848, and became a city in 1855. Originally, mayors were elected on January 1 for one-year terms.

The following is a list of mayors of London:

== Chain of office ==
Since 1957, each sitting mayor has been honoured and presented with the chain of office to wear during their term of office. The chain of office is to be worn by the mayor during council sessions and other official occasions, including opening and closing ceremonies such as London's hosting of national and international sports and athletic competitions. The chain contains medallions engraved with subjects of local significance. The chain is also engraved with the names of the mayors who have worn it since it was commissioned. There are currently eleven names of previous mayors engraved on the chain.

== Town of London ==
Name	Term start	Term end
Simeon Morrill	1848	1848
Thomas C. Dixon	1849	1849
Simeon Morrill	1850	1851
Edward Adams	1852	1853
Marcus Holmes	1854	1854

== City of London ==
Name	Term start	Term end	Notes
Murray Anderson	1855	1855	
William Barker	1856	1856	
Elijah Leonard, Jr.	1857	1857	
David Glass	1858	1858	
William McBride	1859	1859	
James Moffatt	1860	1860	
Francis Evans Cornish	1861	1864	
David Glass	1865	1866	
Frank Smith	1867	1867	
William Simpson Smith	1868	1868	
John Christie	1869	1869	
Simpson Hackett Graydon	1869	1870	
James Mitchell Cousins	1871	1871	
John Campbell	1872	1872	
Andrew McCormick	1873	1873	
Benjamin Cronyn, Jr.	1874	1875	Fled Canada for Vermont due to fraud; he is related to actor Hume Cronyn
Duncan Cameron Macdonald	1876	1876	
Robert Pritchard	1877	1877	
Robert Lewis	1878	1879	
John Campbell	1880	1881	
Edmund Meredith	1882	1883	
Charles Smith Hyman	1884	1884	
Henry Becher	1885	1885	
Thomas Daniel Hodgens	1886	1886	
James Cowan	1887	1888	
George Taylor	1889	1891	
William Melville Spencer	1892	1892	
Emanuel Thomas Essery	1893	1894	
John William Little	1895	1897	
John Dolway Wilson	1898	1899	
Frederick George Rumball	1900	1901	
Adam Beck	1902	1904	
Clarence Thomas Campbell	1905	1905	
Joseph Coulson Judd	1906	1907	
Samuel Stevely	1908	1909	
John Henry Alfred Beattie	1910	1911	
Charles Milton Richardson Graham	1912	1914	
Hugh Allan Stevenson	1915	1915	
William Moir Gartshore	1916	1916	
Hugh Allan Stevenson	1916	1917	
Charles Ross Somerville	1918	1919	
Edgar Sydney Little	1920	1921	
John Cameron Wilson	1921	1922	
George Albert Wenige	1923	1925	
John Mackenzie Moore	1926	1927	
George Albert Wenige	1928	1928	
William John Kirkpatrick	1929	1930	
Edwy George Hayman	1931	1932	
Ferrier Baker Kilbourne	1933	1933	
George Albert Wenige	1934	1935	
Thomas Kingsmill	1936	1938	
Joseph Allan Johnston	1939	1940	
William J. Heaman	1941	1945	
Frederick George McAlister	1946	1946	
George Albert Wenige	1947	1948	
Ray Ameredith Dennis	1949	1949	
George Albert Wenige	1950	1950	
Allan Johnson Rush	1951	1955	
George Ernest Beedle	1955	1955	
Ray Ameredith Dennis	1955	1957	
Joseph Allan Johnston	1958	1960	
Gordon Stronach	1961	1968	
Herbert Joseph McClure	1968	1971	
James Frederick Gosnell	1972	1972	
Jane Elizabeth Bigelow	1972	1978	
Martin Alphonse Gleeson	1979	1985	
Thomas Charles Gosnell	1986	1994	
Dianne Haskett	1994	2000	
Anne Marie DeCicco-Best	2000	2010	
Joe Fontana	2010	2014	
Joni Baechler	2014	2014	
Matt Brown	2014	2018	
Ed Holder	2018	2022	
Josh Morgan	2022		

=== 2017 reform ===
In spite of some controversy about this move, London was the first city in Canada (in May 2017) to decide to move a ranked choice ballot for municipal elections starting in 2018. Voters will mark their ballots in order of preference, ranking their top three favourite candidates. An individual must reach 50 per cent of the total to be declared elected; in each round of counting where a candidate has not yet reached that target, the person with the fewest votes is dropped from the ballot and their second or third choice preferences reallocated to the remaining candidates, with this process repeating until a candidate has reached 50 per cent.

== Sources ==
- Frederick H. Armstrong and John H. Lutman, The Forest City: An Illustrated History of London, Canada. Burlington, Ontario: Windsor Publications, 1986.
- Orlo Miller, London 200: An Illustrated History. London: London Chamber of Commerce, 1992.
