= Joseph Judd =

Canadian lawyer and politician

Joseph Coulson Judd, KC (February 1, 1864 – January 14, 1926) was a lawyer and politician in Ontario, Canada. He served as mayor of London from 1906 to 1907.

The son of Hubert Henry Judd, a native of England, and Margaret Coluson, he was born in London, Canada West, and was educated there and at Osgoode Hall Law School. Judd was called to the Ontario bar in 1886 and joined the London law firm of Meredith & Meredith, becoming a partner. He served on London city council from 1891 to 1894. From 1895 to 1897, he was a water commissioner. He also served as chairman of the library board and of the water commission. He ran unsuccessfully for the Middlesex South seat in the Canadian House of Commons in 1900, losing to Malcolm McGugan. Also in 1900, he was named police magistrate for London. From 1903 to 1904, Judd was chairman of the city council's finance committee. He was named King's Counsel in 1908. Judd was also president of the London and Port Stanley Railway from 1906 to 1907.

Judd married Elizabeth J. Forman.

Judd was a member of the Canadian Order of Foresters, the local Masonic lodge and the Sons of England. He also served as vice-president of the local Canadian Club.

He died in Ontario at the age of 81.
