= Anne Marie DeCicco-Best =

60th mayor of London, Ontario, Canada

60th Mayor of London, Ontario
- In office December 4, 2000 – November 30, 2010
- Preceded by: Dianne Haskett
- Succeeded by: Joe Fontana

Personal details
- Spouse: Tim Best

Anne Marie DeCicco-Best (born April 1964) was the 60th and longest-serving mayor of London, Ontario, Canada.

== Early life and family ==
DeCicco graduated from Fanshawe College's broadcast journalism program in 1986 and worked for CHYR in Leamington, Ontario, before returning in 1987 to work at CJBK and CJBX, a country music station in London as a reporter covering city hall. From 1994 to 1997, while serving on city council, she was a part-time instructor in a communications course at Fanshawe College.

== Career ==
DeCicco was first elected to London City Council in 1991 as a councillor in Ward Five, becoming the youngest person ever to serve there, after former Ward Five councillor Grant Hopcroft made the jump to the Board of Control.

In 1996 she was a supporter of London's bid for the 2001 Canada Summer Games, which were subsequently awarded to London. In 1997, after two, three-year terms as a ward councillor, she topped the polls when she was elected to the London Board of Control and acted as deputy mayor and budget chief to Dianne Haskett, whom she succeeded as mayor in the 2000 election. She was re-elected to a second term in 2003.

She also serves on the board of governors of the University of Western Ontario (UWO) and the London Police Services Board.

On June 17, 2006, DeCicco married Tim Best, a 44-year-old native Londoner who'd previously lived in Texas, that she first met at the John Labatt Centre in downtown London during the 2005 Memorial Cup hockey championship.

On November 13, 2006, DeCicco-Best was re-elected for a third consecutive term as the mayor of London in the 2006 municipal election. Her main opponent was former London North Centre Liberal Member of Parliament Joe Fontana. Her victory in this election, with its four-year term mandated by the province of Ontario, made DeCicco-Best the longest-serving mayor in London's history, in office for 10 consecutive years.

On October 25, 2010, Fontana defeated DeCicco-Best in the 2010 municipal election to become the mayor of London.

DeCicco-Best currently works for Fanshawe College assisting with public relations.

== Criticisms ==
DeCicco-Best was heavily criticized for the actions of her husband, who opened up a "for profit" check-cashing business outside the city's welfare office, was charged with six criminal counts, including impaired driving causing bodily harm, sentenced to six months in jail.

== Jewish National Fund ==
The Jewish National Fund of London honoured Anne Marie DeCicco-Best as its 2011 London Negev Dinner Honouree. As London's longest-serving Mayor (2000-2010) and member of London City Council for 19 years, DeCicco-Best was recognized for her dedicated contributions to the community throughout her many years of public service, and her unwavering support of the Jewish community.
