= Joe Fontana =

Italian-born Canadian politician (born 1950)

The Honourable Joe Fontana PC
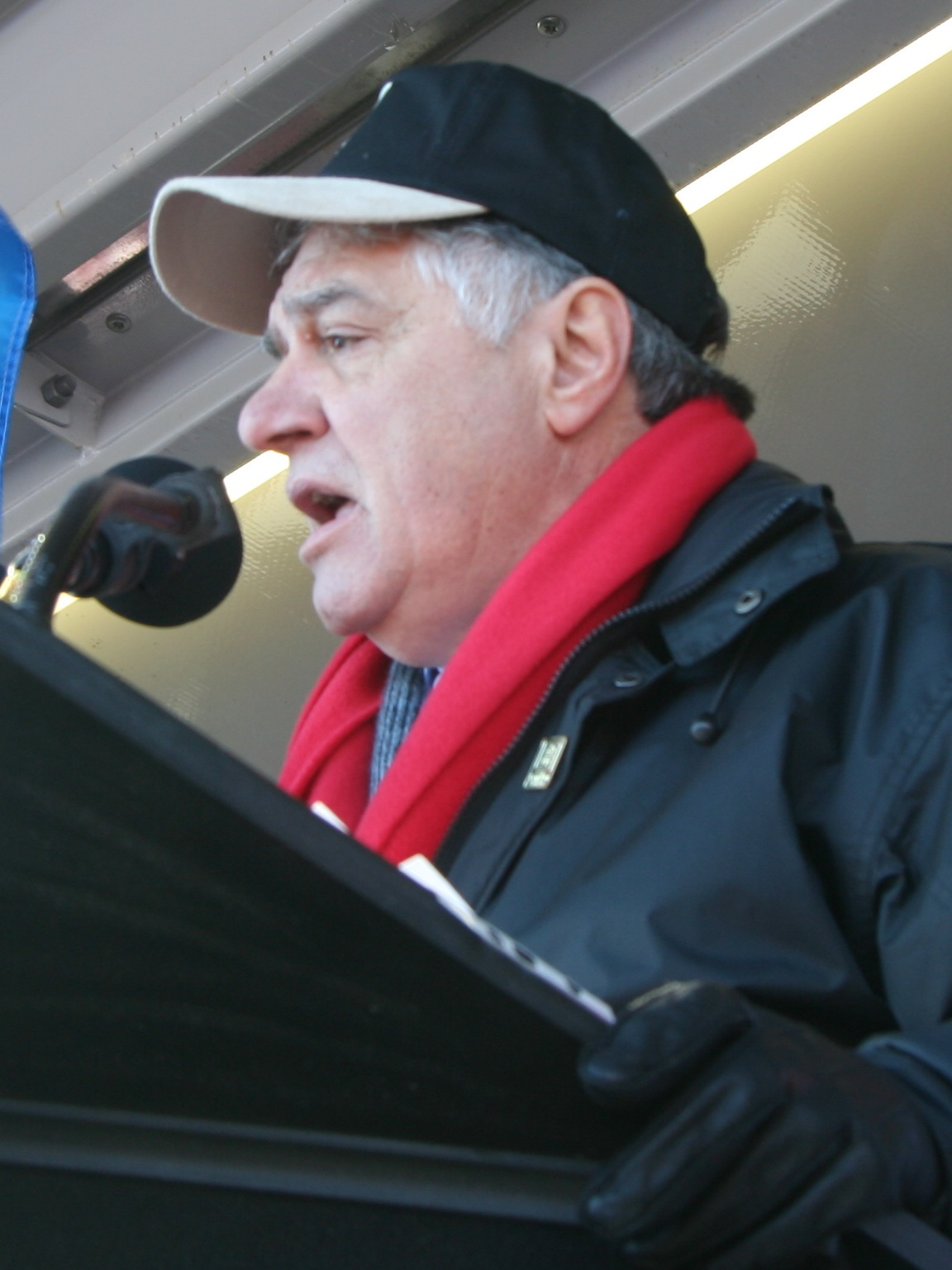
- Fontana in 2012

61st Mayor of London
- In office December 1, 2010 – June 19, 2014
- Preceded by: Anne Marie DeCicco-Best
- Succeeded by: Joni Baechler

Member of Parliament for London North Centre
- In office June 2, 1997 – September 20, 2006
- Preceded by: District created
- Succeeded by: Glen Pearson

Member of Parliament for London East
- In office November 21, 1988 – June 1, 1997
- Preceded by: Jim Jepson
- Succeeded by: District abolished

Personal details
- Born: January 13, 1950 (age 76) Cellara, Cosenza, Italy
- Party: Liberal

Joseph Frank Fontana PC (born January 13, 1950) is an Italian-born Canadian politician. He was a Liberal member of the House of Commons of Canada from 1987 to 2006, and mayor of London, Ontario from 2010 until his 2014 convictions for fraud and forgery.

== Life and career ==
Fontana was born in Cellara, Cosenza, Italy in 1950, and moved to Canada with his parents at the age of four.

He studied chemical engineering at the University of Waterloo, but left school after becoming the drummer in a rock band. He later moved to London and briefly returned to school at the University of Western Ontario, but left to work in real estate and the insurance industry.

He opposed the building of a federal prison in London and soon became involved in local politics. In 1976 he ran for city council, representing Ward 3, but lost; in 1978 he also lost the Liberal nomination for the federal riding of London-Middlesex, but was elected to London City Council later in the year and served there until 1988, sitting on London's Board of Control from 1985 to 1988.

== As Member of Parliament ==
In 1988 he was elected to the House of Commons as a member of the opposition and served as Critic for Urban Affairs and Housing. He also formed the band "True Grit" with several Liberals including Roger Gallaway and future prime minister Jean Chrétien (who played trombone). He became the Ontario chair of the Liberal caucus and was involved in the Task Force on Via Rail and the Task Force on the Economy and Recession. In 1990 he supported Paul Martin's attempt to become leader of the Liberal Party.

He was re-elected in 1993 and became parliamentary secretary to the Minister of Transport, playing a key role in, among other things, the introduction of the National Airports Policy. From 1996 to 1999 he served a record three times as chair of the national Liberal caucus and in 1999 became chair of the Standing Committee on Citizenship and Immigration and the chair of the Southwestern Ontario Liberal caucus.

He served as Minister of Labour in Paul Martin's minority government until February 6, 2006, when Stephen Harper was sworn in as Prime Minister.

He was re-elected in 1997, 2000, 2004, and 2006. Appointed as the critic for Science and Research within the Liberal shadow cabinet, Mr. Fontana was strongly speculated to be considering a run for leader of the Liberal Party of Canada, though he ultimately did not seek the post, supporting Gerard Kennedy instead.

== Election as mayor ==
On September 8, 2006, Fontana announced that he would run for mayor in London against mayor Anne Marie DeCicco-Best. On September 20, 2006, Fontana formally resigned his seat in the House of Commons in order to run for mayor. He was unsuccessful, losing badly to Mayor DeCicco-Best.

He subsequently announced he would run in the 2010 London mayoral election, again against DeCicco-Best. Fontana won the mayoralty in that election.

As a member of the Privy Council of Canada, Fontana automatically received the Queen Elizabeth II Diamond Jubilee Medal in 2012.

== Criminal convictions ==
In October 2012, calls for Fontana's resignation as mayor were made amid allegations of misuse of government funds used to pay for his son's wedding. Some city councillors urged Fontana to step aside during the investigation.

On November 21, 2012, the London detachment of the Royal Canadian Mounted Police issued a press release announcing that Fontana had been charged with breach of trust by a public officer; fraud under $5,000; and uttering forged documents.

On November 22, 2012, Fontana resigned from the London Police Services Board. Under municipal law governing Ontario, Police Services cannot allow an individual who is under investigation for a criminal offences to take part in any police function. At the next meeting of council's Finance and Administrative Services Committee, its councillors asked that Fontanta step aside, voting by a 3–1 vote margin that he resign his council seat and duties as mayor, however the committee decision was not binding under the Municipal Act. A council motion asking Fontana to leave office pending resolution of his criminal charges lost by a vote, 8–5.

Fontana was found guilty of the charges by the Ontario Superior Court on June 13, 2014, and sentenced to serve 4 months under house arrest and 18 months on probation.

On June 16, 2014, Fontana announced he would be stepping down as mayor of London. He formally resigned on June 19, and was temporarily succeeded by Ward 3 city councillor Joe Swan as acting mayor until a council vote the following week selected Joni Baechler as his formal successor until the 2014 municipal election.

== Electoral record ==
London mayoral election, 2010

Mayoral Candidate	Vote	%
Joe Fontana	48,626	47.2
Anne Marie DeCicco-Best (X)	46,089	44.8
Cynthia Etheridge	4,402	4.3
Eric Southern	644	0.6
Ivan W. Kasiurak	612	0.6
Christopher R. Foerster	462	0.4
Aaron Broughm	427	0.4
Wayne Ford	375	0.4
Zak Young	298	0.3
Stephen Elliott Beckles	252	0.2
Tomasz Winnicki	234	0.2
Dan Lenart	173	0.2
Tom Ha	149	0.1
Ma'in Sinan	128	0.1
Jonas Richard White	83	0.1

London mayoral election, 2006

Candidate	Vote	%
Anne Marie DeCicco-Best (X)	57,891	57.7
Joe Fontana	35,083	35.7
Cynthia Etheridge	2,561	2.6
Ivan W. Kasiurak	1,905	1.9
Arthur Majoor	1,623	1.6
Matthew L. R. Shantz	532	0.5

2006 Canadian federal election
Party	Candidate	Votes	%	±%	Expenditures
Liberal	Joe Fontana	24,109	40.12	-2.96	$78,406
Conservative	John Mazzilli	17,968	29.90	+2.46	$63,536
New Democratic	Stephen Maynard	14,271	23.75	-0.39	$20,817
Green	Stuart Smith	3,300	5.49	+0.72	$2,442
Progressive Canadian	Rod Morley	283	0.47	+0.03	$2,852
Marxist–Leninist	Margaret Mondaca	160	0.27	+0.14	$0.00

2004 Canadian federal election
Party	Candidate	Votes	%	±%
Liberal	Joe Fontana	21,472	43.08	-8.46
Conservative	Tim Gatten	13,677	27.44	-9.57
New Democratic	Joe Swan	12,034	24.14	+15.24
Green	Bronagh Joyce Morgan	2,376	4.77	+3.23
Progressive Canadian	Rod Morley	220	0.44	–
Marxist–Leninist	Gustavo Grandos-Ocon	67	0.13	–

^ Conservative change is from combined Canadian Alliance and Progressive Conservative totals.

2000 Canadian federal election
Party	Candidate	Votes	%	±%
Liberal	Joe Fontana	22,795	51.54	-0.18
Alliance	Nancy Branscombe	9,062	20.49	+5.30
Progressive Conservative	Lorie Johnson	7,305	16.52	-0.95
New Democratic	Colleen Redmond	3,936	8.90	-3.39
Green	Jeremy McNaughton	681	1.54	+0.06
Marijuana	Tim Berg	453	1.02	-

^ Canadian Alliance change is from Reform

1997 Canadian federal election
Party	Candidate	Votes	%	±%
Liberal	Joe Fontana	23,891	51.72	
Progressive Conservative	Jim Henkel	8,072	17.47	
Reform	Tara Bingham	7,016	15.19	
New Democratic	Colleen Redmond	5,679	12.29	
Green	Jeff Culbert	685	1.48	
Christian Heritage	Ken Devries	375	0.81	
Independent	Michael Rubinoff	336	0.73	
Marxist–Leninist	Vera Cruise	138	0.30	

1993 Canadian federal election
Party	Candidate	Votes	%	±%
Liberal	Joe Fontana	28,279	55.8%	+18.1%
Progressive Conservative	Rob Alder	9,237	18.2%	-19.3%
Reform	Paul Cheng	8,704	17.2%	+17.2%
New Democratic	Alfredo Marroquin	2,614	5.2%	-19.2%
National	Bill Cecil-Smith	830	1.6%	+1.6%
Green	Jeff Culbert	567	1.1%	+1.1%
Natural Law	Jim Hill	282	0.6%	+0.6%
Canada Party	Al Plumb	108	0.2%	+0.2%
Commonwealth of Canada	Sid Tarleton	31	0.1%	+0.1%

1988 Canadian federal election
Party	Candidate	Votes	%	±%
Liberal	Joe Fontana	19,547	37.7%	+11.8%
Progressive Conservative	Jim Jepson	19,445	37.5%	-9.7%
New Democratic	Marion Boyd	12,667	24.4%	-2.5%
Independent	Peter Ewart	201	0.4%	+0.4%

== See also ==
- List of University of Waterloo people

27th Canadian Ministry (2003–2006) – Cabinet of Paul Martin
Cabinet post (1)
Predecessor	Office	Successor
Claudette Bradshaw	Minister of Labour; 2004–2006 styled as Minister of Labour and Housing	Jean-Pierre Blackburn
