= Matt Brown (Canadian politician) =

Canadian politician

63rd Mayor of London
- In office December 1, 2014 – November 30, 2018
- Preceded by: Joni Baechler
- Succeeded by: Ed Holder

Personal details
- Born: Matthew Brown London, Ontario, Canada
- Party: Independent
- Children: John Brown, Braden Brown

Matthew Brown is a Canadian politician who served as the 63rd mayor of London from 2014 to 2018.

== Background ==
Brown was born in London, Ontario. He grew up in Woodstock before graduating from the University of Waterloo. He has two sons, named John Brown and Braden Brown.

== Mayoralty ==
In the 2014 mayoral race, he defeated runner-up Paul Cheng. Prior to his election to the mayoralty, Brown represented Ward 7 on London City Council.

As mayor, Brown oversaw the planning phase of the Shift bus rapid transit (BRT) network, on which construction began after his term as mayor. The BRT network was a contentious issue during Brown's term as mayor.

In a 2017 episode of the television series Political Blind Date, Brown and Toronto city councillor Giorgio Mammoliti discussed their differing perspectives on the issue of safe injection sites.

In April 2018, Brown announced that he would not seek re-election in the upcoming municipal election.

== Affair ==
On June 14, 2016, he temporarily suspended his duties as mayor following his disclosure of an affair with deputy mayor Maureen Cassidy. The affair drew national attention across Canada. The London Integrity Commissioner issued a report to City Council stating that Matt Brown and Maureen Cassidy violated sections 2.4, 5.1 and 5.1(1)(e) of the Municipal Code of Conduct. In the report the integrity commissioner stated that he "[had] no authority" under current guidelines to demand a resignation or to prevent either officeholder from running for re-election.

Brown announced his return to duties as mayor on June 22, 2016, and on June 23, 2016, attended his first council meeting since the leave.

On September 29, 2016, it was reported by CBC News that he had separated from his wife.

== Electoral record ==
=== 2010 Ward 7 Council race ===
Name	Votes	%
Matt BROWN	4,976	58.16
Walter LONC	1,818	21.25
Phil MCLEOD	1,455	17.01
Justin SAMLAL	307	3.59
Total	8,556	

=== 2014 mayoral race ===
Name	Votes	%
Matt BROWN	63,842	57.75
Paul CHENG	37,938	34.32
Joe SWAN	4,623	4.18
Roger CARANCI	1,190	1.08
Arnon KAPLANSKY	700	0.63
Donna KELLEY	543	0.49
Marie MISZCZAK	522	0.47
Steven GARDNER	351	0.32
Jim KOGELHEIDE	276	0.25
Tae Khun HA	112	0.10
Dan LENART	110	0.10
Dennis PERRY	107	0.10
Alexander MAIN	87	0.08
Carlos MURRAY	76	0.07
Ma'in SINAN	74	0.07
Ali Hamadi	7	0.01
Total	110,551	
