= Conseil scolaire catholique Providence =

French-language school board in Canada

Coordinates: 42.29710°N 82.92615°W

Conseil scolaire catholique Providence Csc Providence

Address
- 7515 Forest Glade Drive Windsor, Ontario, N8T 3P5; Canada

District information
- Director of education: Carolyn Bastien
- Schools: 31 Total (23 elementary, 8 secondary)
- Budget: CA$168 million (2021-2022)

Other information
- Elected trustees: Jacques Kenny, Robert Demers, Doris Sauvé, Didier Marotte, Janine Brydges, Christine Brooks, Pauline Morais, Alexandre Alary, Philippe Morin, Meghan Reale, Paul Lachance
- Student trustees: Lisa Chemali and Owen Hoffman
- Website: cscprovidence.ca

The Conseil scolaire catholique Providence (Csc Providence) is the French-language Catholic school board for southwestern Ontario, Canada. The Providence Catholic School Board includes 10,000 students in its 31 schools: 23 elementary schools and 8 high schools for the communities of Windsor-Essex, Chatham-Kent, Sarnia-Lambton, London/Middlesex, Oxford-Woodstock, Grey-Bruce and Huron-Perth. The board was previously known as the Conseil scolaire de district des écoles catholiques du Sud-Ouest (CSDÉCSO).

The board's head office is in Windsor, and it maintains satellite offices in the Pain Court section of Chatham-Kent, and in London; the London office serves Middlesex County.

== Elementary schools ==
- École élémentaire catholique Frère-André, London
- École élémentaire catholique Georges-P.-Vanier, Windsor
- École élémentaire catholique Monseigneur-Augustin-Caron, LaSalle
- École élémentaire catholique Monseigneur-Jean-Noël, Windsor
- École élémentaire catholique Pavillon des Jeunes, Belle-Rivière
- École élémentaire catholique Saint-Ambroise, St. Joachim
- École élémentaire catholique Saint-Antoine, Tecumseh
- École élémentaire catholique Saint-Dominique-Savio, Owen Sound
- École élémentaire catholique Saint-Edmond, Windsor
- École élémentaire catholique Saint-Francis, Tilbury
- École élémentaire catholique Saint-Jean-Baptiste, Amherstburg
- École élémentaire catholique Saint-Jean-de-Brébeuf, London
- École élémentaire catholique Saint-Michel, Leamington
- École élémentaire catholique Saint-Paul, Pointe-aux-Roches
- École élémentaire catholique Saint-Philippe, Grande Pointe
- École élémentaire catholique Saint-Thomas-d'Aquin, Sarnia
- École élémentaire catholique Sainte-Catherine, Pain Court
- École élémentaire catholique Sainte-Jeanne-d'Arc, London
- École élémentaire catholique Sainte-Marguerite-Bourgeoys, Woodstock
- École élémentaire catholique Sainte-Marguerite-d'Youville, Tecumseh
- École élémentaire catholique Sainte-Marie, Chatham
- École élémentaire catholique Sainte-Thérèse, Windsor
- École élémentaire catholique Sainte-Ursule, McGregor

== Secondary schools ==
- École secondaire catholique de Pain Court, Pain Court
- École secondaire catholique E. J. Lajeunesse, Windsor
- École secondaire catholique l'Essor, Tecumseh
- École secondaire catholique Monseigneur-Bruyère, London
- École secondaire catholique Notre-Dame, Woodstock
- École secondaire catholique Saint-Dominique-Savio, Owen Sound
- École secondaire catholique Saint-François-Xavier, Sarnia
- École secondaire catholique Sainte-Trinité, Windsor

== Book burning controversy ==
In 2021, the board attracted a significant outcry after it was revealed that the schools held a "flame purification" ceremony in 2019. As part of the program, over 4,700 books considered to be culturally outdated or offensive to Indigenous peoples were removed from school libraries and ceremonially burned. Among the thirty titles selected to be destroyed were several Adventures of Tintin novels, Lucky Luke, Asterix and the Great Crossing and two biographies of Jacques Cartier. A spokesperson described it as a "gesture of reconciliation with the First Nations and a gesture of openness towards other groups represented in the school district and in society." The board's decision sparked a major emotional backlash, including condemnations from Canadian Prime Minister Justin Trudeau, Conservative Party of Canada leader Erin O'Toole and Bloc Québécois leader Yves-François Blanchet.

== See also ==
- List of school districts in Ontario
- List of high schools in Ontario
