= List of schools of the Conseil scolaire Viamonde =

The following article is a list of schools of the Conseil scolaire Viamonde (CSV). Conseil scolaire Viamonde is a public French first language secular school board located in Ontario, Canada. It manages public daycares, elementary, and secondary schools in the Ontario Peninsula, an area made of Southwestern Ontario, and most of the Greater Golden Horseshoe

== List of institutions ==
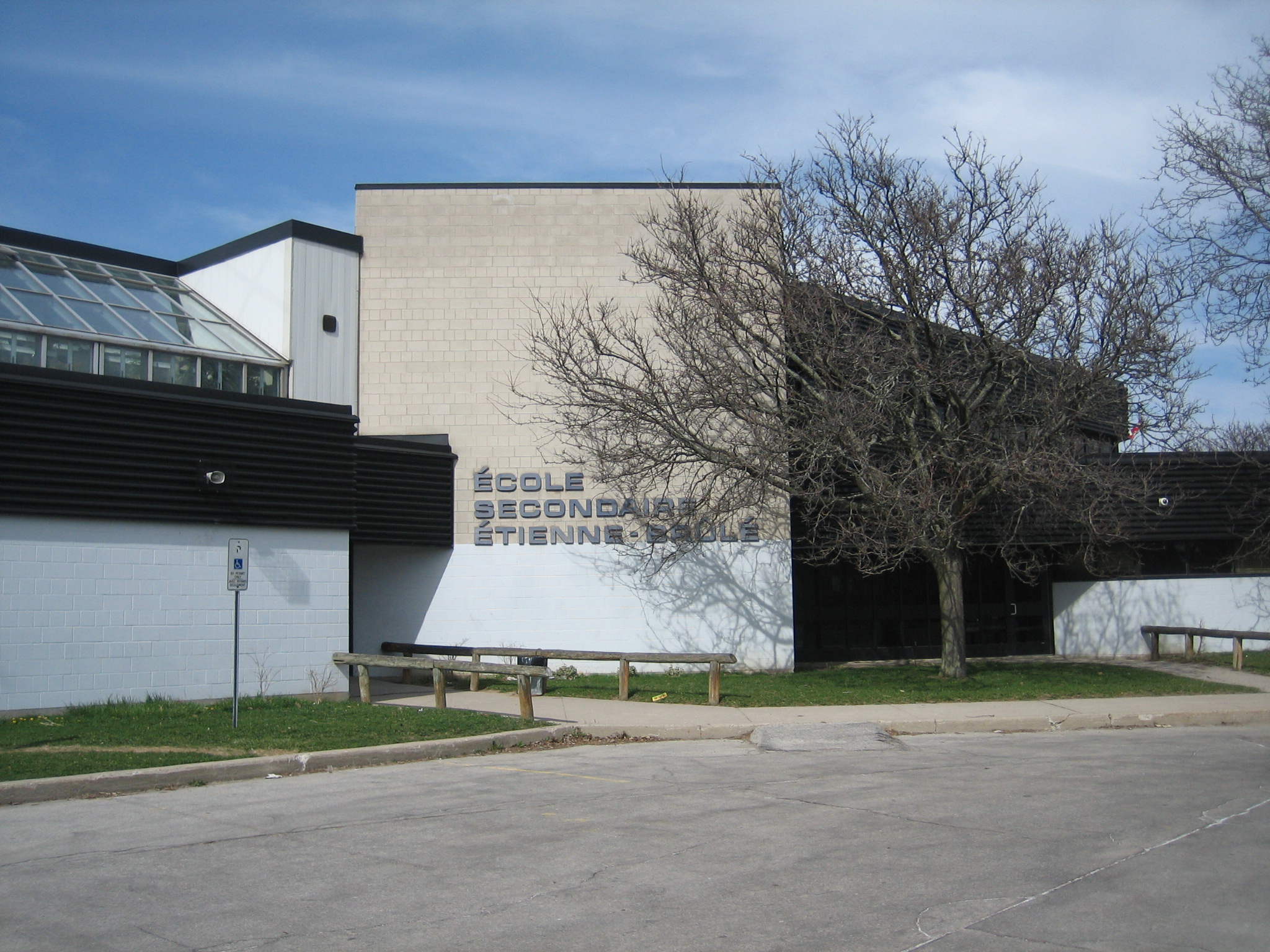
École secondaire Étienne-Brûlé is one of 15 secondary schools operated by Conseil scolaire Viamonde.

CSV elementary and secondary schools are organized by which county/single-tier/upper-tier municipalities they are located in.

| County/single-tier/upper-tier municipalities | Elementary School | Secondary School |
|---|---|---|
| Barrie | École élémentaire La Source | École secondaire Roméo Dallaire; It was named after Roméo Dallaire. It received its name in March 2010 after a referendum open to members of the school board, employees, students, and parents. It was scheduled to open on May 26, 2010. Dallaire was scheduled to visit the school that day. |
| Dufferin County | École élémentaire des Quatre-Rivières (Note: Located in Town of Orangeville, a lower-tier municipality of Dufferin County.) | |
| Guelph | École élémentaire L'Odyssée | |
| Hamilton | École élémentaire Pavillon de la jeunesse | École secondaire Georges- P.-Vanier |
| Lambton County | École élémentaire Les Rapides (Note: Located in City of Sarnia, a lower-tier municipality of Lambton County.) | École secondaire Franco-Jeunesse |
| London | Académie de la Tamise; École élémentaire La Pommeraie; École élémentaire Marie-Curie | École secondaire Gabriel-Dumont |
| Regional Municipality of Durham | École élémentaire Antonine Maillet (Note: Located in City of Oshawa, a lower-tier municipality of Durham Region.); École élémentaire Ronald-Marion (Note: Located in City of Pickering, a lower-tier municipality of Durham Region.); École élémentaire Viola-Léger (Note: Located in Municipality of Clarington, a lower-tier municipality of Durham Region.) | École secondaire Ronald-Marion |
| Regional Municipality of Halton | École élémentaire du Chêne (Note: Located in Town of Oakville, a lower-tier municipality of Halton Region.); École élémentaire Dyane-Adam; École élémentaire Patricia-Picknell; École élémentaire Renaissance (Note: Located in City of Burlington, a lower-tier municipality of Halton Region.) | École secondaire Gaétan-Gervais |
| Regional Municipality of Niagara | École élémentaire Champlain (Note: Located in City of Welland, a lower-tier municipality of the Niagara Region); École élémentaire LaMarsh (Note: Located in City of Niagara Falls, a lower-tier municipality of the Niagara Region); École élémentaire L'Héritage (Note: Located in City of St. Catharines, a lower-tier municipality of the Niagara Region); École élémentaire Nouvel Horizon; École élémentaire Franco-Niagara | École secondaire Confédération, closed; École secondaire Franco-Niagara, |
| Regional Municipality of Peel | École élémentaire Carrefour des jeunes (Note: Located in City of Brampton, a lower-tier municipality of Peel Region.); École élémentaire Horizon Jeunesse (Note: Located in City of Mississauga, a lower-tier municipality of Peel Region.); École élémentaire Le Flambeau | École secondaire Jeunes sans frontières |
| Regional Municipality of Waterloo | École élémentaire L'Harmonie (Note: Located in City of Waterloo, a lower-tier municipality of Waterloo Region.) | École secondaire David-Saint-Jacques |
| Regional Municipality of York | Académie de la Moraine (Note: Located in Town of Richmond Hill, a lower-tier municipality of York Region.); École élémentaire La Fontaine (Note: Located in City of Vaughan, a lower-tier municipality of York Region.); École élémentaire Chantal-Benoit | École secondaire Norval-Morrisseau |
| Simcoe County | Académie la Pinède (Note: Located in CFB Borden, a Canadian Forces base in Simcoe County.); École publique Saint-Joseph (Note: Located in City of Penetanguishene, a lower-tier municipality of Simcoe County.) | École secondaire Le Caron |
| Toronto | Académie Alexandre-Dumas; École élémentaire Charles-Sauriol; École élémentaire Félix-Leclerc; École élémentaire Gabrielle-Roy; École élémentaire Jeanne-Lajoie; École élémentaire La Mosaïque; École élémentaire Laure-Rièse; École élémentaire Mathieu-da-Costa; École élémentaire Micheline-Saint-Cyr; École élémentaire Paul-Demers; École élémentaire Pierre-Elliott-Trudeau | Le Collège français; École secondaire Étienne-Brûlé; École secondaire Toronto Ouest; École secondaire Michelle O'Bonsawin |
| Windsor | École élémentaire L'Envolée; École élémentaire Louise-Charron | École secondaire de Lamothe-Cadillac |

== See also ==
- List of schools in the Conseil scolaire catholique MonAvenir
- List of schools in the Toronto Catholic District School Board
- List of schools in the Toronto District School Board
