= Steve Stoyanovich =

Canadian ice hockey player

- Born: May 2, 1957 (age 68) London, Ontario, Canada
- Height: 6 ft 2 in (188 cm)
- Weight: 205 lb (93 kg; 14 st 9 lb)
- Position: Centre
- Shot: Left
- Played for: Hartford Whalers
- NHL draft: 69th overall, 1977; New York Islanders
- WHA draft: 32nd overall, 1977; Calgary Cowboys
- Playing career: 1981–1988

Steve Stoyanovich (born May 2, 1957 in London, Ontario) is a Canadian former professional ice hockey player who played 23 games in the National Hockey League with the Hartford Whalers during the 1983–84 season. The rest of his career, which lasted from 1981 to 1988, was mainly spent in the Italian Serie A.

As a youth, he played in the 1969 and 1970 Quebec International Pee-Wee Hockey Tournaments with a minor ice hockey team from London.

He owns Five Tim Hortons restaurants in the North West of London, Ontario region.

== Career statistics ==
=== Regular season and playoffs ===
			Regular season					Playoffs
Season	Team	League	GP	G	A	Pts	PIM	GP	G	A	Pts	PIM
1974–75	Sir Frederick Banting Secondary School	HS-CA	60	70	60	130	—	—	—	—	—	—
1975–76	Oakridge Secondary School	HS-CA	30	20	30	50	—	—	—	—	—	—
1976–77	Rensselaer Polytechnic Institute	ECAC	29	19	22	41	32	—	—	—	—	—
1977–78	Rensselaer Polytechnic Institute	ECAC	28	22	30	52	24	—	—	—	—	—
1978–79	Rensselaer Polytechnic Institute	ECAC	28	17	30	47	32	—	—	—	—	—
1979–80	Rensselaer Polytechnic Institute	ECAC	17	9	15	24	16	—	—	—	—	—
1980–81	Petrolia Squires	OHA Sr	20	31	12	43	—	—	—	—	—	—
1981–82	Indianapolis Checkers	CHL	80	42	30	72	55	13	7	8	15	20
1982–83	Indianapolis Checkers	CHL	79	41	43	84	65	13	6	3	9	4
1983–84	Hartford Whalers	NHL	23	3	5	8	11	—	—	—	—	—
1983–84	Binghamton Whalers	AHL	21	11	8	19	0	—	—	—	—	—
1984–85	HC Gherdëina	ITA	26	31	35	66	28	8	14	6	20	16
1985–86	HC Gherdëina	ITA	36	53	35	88	52	4	8	5	13	52
1986–87	HC Fiemme Cavalese	ITA-2	—	—	—	—	—	—	—	—	—	—
1987–88	HC Fiemme Cavalese	ITA	35	37	47	84	79	—	—	—	—	—
1988–89	SG Cortina	ITA	12	10	14	24	16	—	—	—	—	—
ITA totals			109	131	131	262	175	12	22	11	33	68
NHL totals			23	3	5	8	11	—	—	—	—	—
