= Marie Curie (disambiguation) =

Maria Skłodowska-Curie (1867–1934) was a Polish chemist and physicist.

Marie Curie may also refer to:

- Marie Curie (charity), a British terminal illness charity
- Marie Curie (rover), a flight spare for the Sojourner Mars rover
- Marie Curie (1977 miniseries), a 1977 UK TV miniseries starring Jane Lapotaire
- Marie Curie (film), a 2016 Polish film
- Maria Curie-Skłodowska University, a university in Lublin, Poland
- Marie Curie High School, a public high school in Ho Chi Minh City, Vietnam
- Curie Metropolitan High School, a public high school in Chicago, Illinois
- Marie Curie Middle School 158, a middle school in Bayside, New York
- École élémentaire Marie-Curie, a public elementary school in London, Ontario, Canada
- Maria Skłodowska-Curie Bridge, Warsaw, a bridge over the Vistula River in Warsaw, Poland

== See also ==
- Curie (disambiguation)
- Madame Curie (disambiguation)
- Marie Currie, rock singer and songwriter
- Marie Skłodowska-Curie Actions, a research fellowship program run by the European Commission
- Marie Curie Gargoyle, a sculpture based on Marie Curie
- Marie Curie Medal, a science award
