= Radhika Sen =

Indian Army officer

Major Radhika Sen
- Born: Radhika Sen; 1993 (age 32–33); Sundernagar, Mandi, Himachal Pradesh, India
- Alma mater: Panjab University, Chandigarh; IIT Bombay
- Military career
- Allegiance: India
- Service: Indian Army
- Years of Service: 2016–present
- Rank: Major
- Unit: Indian Army Service Corps (IASC)
- Commands: Engagement Platoon Commander, Indian Rapid Deployment Battalion
- Known for: Recipient of the United Nations Military Gender Advocate of the Year Award (2023)
- Awards: United Nations Military Gender Advocate of the Year Award

Major Radhika Sen is an Indian Army officer known for her impactful service with the United Nations peacekeeping mission in the Democratic Republic of the Congo. Born in Himachal Pradesh in 1993, she joined the army. As engagement platoon commander in MONUSCO, she led efforts to support community security, gender equality, and education for local populations. Her work earned her the 2024 United Nations Military Gender Advocate of the Year Award, with UN Secretary-General António Guterres commending her as a “true leader and role model.”

== Early life and education ==
Major Sen was born in 1993 in Baroh Village, Mandi District, Himachal Pradesh, India. She completed her schooling at St. Mary's High School in Sundernagar, Himachal Pradesh. Showing a strong interest in science, Sen pursued a bachelor's degree in biotechnology at Panjab University, Chandigarh, and later attended the Indian Institute of Technology (IIT) Bombay, where she was working on her master's degree before joining the Indian Army. Inspired by a passion for service, she left her studies mid-way to pursue a career in the military.

== Military career ==
Sen began her military training in 2015 at the Officers Training Academy (OTA) in Chennai. After successfully completing her training, she served as a lieutenant in various postings across India, including Jammu and Kashmir, Ladakh, and Sikkim.

== United Nations Peacekeeping Mission ==
In March 2023, Major Sen was deployed to the United Nations Organization Stabilization Mission in the Democratic Republic of the Congo (MONUSCO), where she served as the Engagement Platoon Commander for the Indian Rapid Deployment Battalion. Leading a team of both men and women, her role focused on community engagement, addressing security concerns, and advocating for the rights of women and children. She established Community Alert Networks to help civilians report security issues, created spaces for local women to voice concerns, and conducted educational programs to improve self-reliance.

== Awards and recognition ==
In May 2024, Major Sen received the prestigious United Nations Military Gender Advocate of the Year Award. This award recognized her contributions to gender-sensitive peacekeeping efforts, leadership in conflict zones, and her work to empower women in the Congo. UN Secretary-General António Guterres commended her as a "true leader and role model," noting her dedication to community-building and humanitarian initiatives.

== See also ==
- United Nations peacekeeping
- Women in peacekeeping
- MONUSCO
