= Oakridge Secondary School =

Coordinates: 42.9766°N 81.3137°W

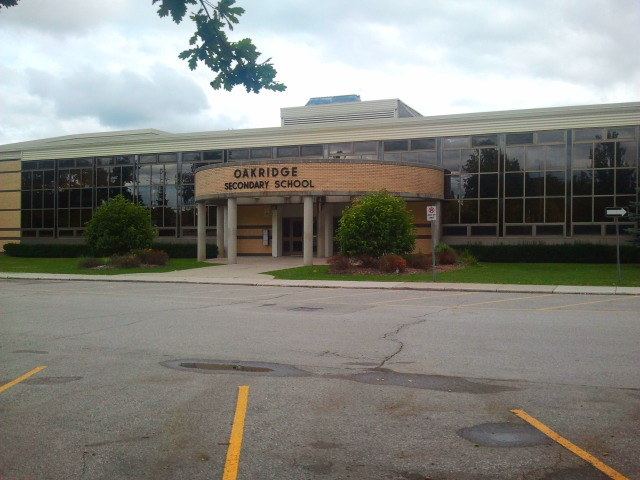

Location
- 1040 Oxford Street West; London, Ontario, N6H 1V4; Canada

Information
- School type: Secondary, government-operated/public
- Motto: Bleed red, blue, and gold
- Founded: 1959
- School board: Thames Valley District School Board
- Principal: Kerry Mastrandrea
- Grades: 9–12
- Language: English
- Colours: Red, blue, and gold
- Mascot: Oak Leaf
- Team name: Oaks
- Website: oakridge.tvdsb.ca

Oakridge Secondary School is one of the government-operated high schools (as opposed to collegiate institutes) in the neighbourhood of Oakridge in London, Ontario, Canada. The school enrolls around 1000 students, and is located on Oxford Street in West London. The school's nickname is Oakridge and its colours are red, blue and gold.

== History ==
Founded as a county school in 1959, Oakridge High School became Oakridge Secondary School when London annexed a large part of the surrounding countryside in 1960. The school became the first in London to adopt three colours: red, blue and gold. Its stability encouraged a large financial investment in modernizing and upgrading the physical plant in a major renovation during 1994–95. The school's Latin motto is "Nostrum viret robur" (Our strength grows as the Oaks). Oakridge is the only school in the Thames Valley District School Board that offers the International Baccalaureate (IB) diploma program.

In 2024, a student was stabbed and sent to hospital with non-life-threatening injuries within the school property by another student.

== Arts ==
Oakridge has a drama department, which presents a major production every second year. In recent years it has presented High School Musical, High School Musical 2, Rent, An Extremely Goofy Movie, Alice in Wonderland and The Little Mermaid. Recently, no shows have been produced, and the drama department is reduced only to drama classes.

== Athletics ==
- Badminton (boys and girls)
- Basketball (boys and girls)
- Curling (boys and girls)
- Cross country running (boys and girls)
- Football (juniors and seniors)
- Fencing (boys and girls)
- Golf (boys and girls)
- Hockey (boys and girls)
- Rowing Club (boys and girls)
- Rugby (boys and girls)
- Soccer (boys and girls)
- Swimming (boys and girls)
- Softball (varsity girls)
- Baseball (varsity boys)
- Tennis (boys and girls)
- Track and field (boys and girls)
- Volleyball (boys and girls)

=== Achievements ===
The Oakridge boys' curling team won the TVRAA Championship in 2018 and 2019.

The Oakridge robotics team dubbed 'Oakbotics' represented Canada along with the Thunderstamps (from the same school board) in the FIRST Robotics World Competition located at Houston in the 2025 season, Reefscape.

== Notable alumni ==
- Andreas Athanasiou
- Josh Brown
- Jenny Jones
- Paul Kozachuk
- Taylor Elgersma
- Tom McCamus
- Julia Tunks
- Morgan Lander
- Mike Moffatt
- Megan Park
- Jason Pierce
- Chris Potter
- Jason Slaughter
- Steve Stoyanovich
- Richard Waugh
- Joshua Workman

== See also ==
- Education in Ontario
- List of secondary schools in Ontario
