= Parkside Collegiate Institute =

Location
- 241 Sunset Drive; St. Thomas, Ontario, N5R 3C2; Canada; 42.75595°N 81.19249°W

Information
- School type: Public Secondary School
- Motto: Animi Cultus Est Pretiosior Auro (Culture is more precious than gold)
- Founded: 1967
- School board: Thames Valley District School Board
- Superintendent: Paul Sydor
- School number: 2260
- Administrator: Tricia Coombes
- Principal: Mike Philips
- Grades: 9–12
- Enrollment: 1,015 (2024/2025)
- Language: English & French (Immersion)
- Colour: Blue/White
- Mascot: Stampy
- Team name: Stampeders
- Website: www.tvdsb.ca/Parkside.cfm

Parkside Collegiate Institute (PCI), with a population of over 1,000 students, is the largest of Three secondary schools in St. Thomas, Ontario. It is part of the Thames Valley District School Board. Parkside was built to replace one of the original schools in St. Thomas, the former St. Thomas Collegiate Institute.

== Programs ==
Parkside is a composite school offering pathways for those bound for the workforce, for college and for university. It is the only secondary school in Elgin County that offers a French immersion program. Such programs include mechanics, arts, sciences, technology and mathematics, along with several others to choose from, ranging from study of careers, to studies of languages. In the fall of 2019, Parkside opened a Spanish course. Parkside also has many extracurricular activities, such as golf, curling, fishing, tennis, badminton, basketball, baseball, volleyball, football, rugby, soccer, hockey, field hockey, track and field, grade 9–12 band, cheerleading, choir, robotics and improv. Parkside also has a Community Living Centre that serves the needs of developmentally challenged pupils.

Parkside recently began offering classes that were originally exclusive to Arthur Voaden Secondary School (AVSS), following Voaden's closure. These classes are Hairstyling and Aesthetics, along with Healthcare classes.

== Facilities ==
Facility upgrades include the resurfacing of the rubberized track, the installation of lights around the football field, the construction of a greenhouse, the addition of solar panels to the school roof, and the construction of a storage building for the extracurricular Canadian football program. Construction for a new learning commons (library) has recently been completed in 2019.

== 2007 fire ==
In early February 2007, there was a fire at Parkside that damaged the cafetorium and caused smoke damage to the music and art rooms. Repairs were complete by September 2007.

== See also ==
- Education in Ontario
- List of secondary schools in Ontario
- Arthur Voaden Secondary School
- Central Elgin Collegiate Institute
