= Terry Wilson (police officer) =

Canadian Police office, later a hate crime investigator and advocate for human rights

Terry D Wilson
- Born: 1964 (age 61–62)
- Education: University of Guelph
- Police career
- Country: Royal Canadian Mounted Police
- Department: London Police Force New Westminster Police Service
- Service years: 1988 - 2015
- Rank: Detective Constable - 2003
- Awards: 20 Year Exemplary Medal; The Royal Canadian Mounted Police Commanding Officers Commendation; The Canadian Solicitors Generals Metal of Exemplary Service; The Canadian Race Relations Foundations Award of Excellence; Friends of Simon Weisenthal Award for Internet Hate Crime Investigations
- Other work: Human rights and Anti-Harassment consultant
- Website: www.hatecrimeexpert.com

Terry D Wilson (born 1964) is a retired Canadian police officer and hate crime investigator based in London, Ontario.

== Early life ==
Wilson grew up in St. Thomas, Ontario as the eldest son of two children of immigrants from England. He graduated from Arthur Voaden Secondary School, where he played football, soccer and wrestled. From 1984 he attended the University of Guelph, graduating in 1988 with a Bachelor of Arts degree. The following year he joined the London Police Service.

== Police service ==
He began serving with the London Police Service in 1989, where he occupied several roles including patrol officer, undercover officer and detective with both a Youth Crime/Gang unit and a Major Crime Unit. In 1995 Wilson adopted the hate crime portfolio for the London Police Service.

Wilson investigated a multitude of hate crimes which included investigations into organized hate groups, such as Northern Alliance, Tri-City Skins and the Canadian Ethnic Cleansing Team. The investigation into the Canadian Ethnic Cleansing Team resulted in two members of the group (James Scott Richardson and Alexian Kulbashian) being charged and convicted for spreading material likely to incite hatred, contrary to Section 13(1) of the Canadian Human Rights Act.

In 2003 Wilson left the London Police Service to join the New Westminster Police Service in British Columbia as a detective with the Domestic Violence and Elder Abuse Response Team. During this time Wilson became a leading authority into Gender-based crimes. Although Wilson occupied the role of a full-time detective with the domestic response team he continued to assisted the BC Hate Crime Team in the education of police in the identification, investigation and prosecution of crimes motivated by hate. In January 2009, Wilson was awarded the 20 Year Exemplary Medal Award for his 20 years service to the force.

In November 2009 Wilson was seconded as the municipal police representative to the BC Hate Crime Team. In this position Wilson investigated, assisted and advised in hate investigations throughout the province of British Columbia. Wilson was the lead investigator into a series of assaults involving members of a white supremacist group known as Blood and Honour Canada.

Wilson was also the lead investigator in two different internet hate propaganda investigations involving the websites www.Radicalpress.com and www.podblanc.com. These investigations resulted in charges under Section 319(2) of the Criminal Code against Arthur Topham and Craig Cobb.

Wilson has been designated an expert in hate symbols by the British Columbian Provincial Court and has testified at the Canadian Human Rights Tribunal.

Wilson has lectured extensively in Canada and internationally on the investigation of hate crimes.

In April 2015 Wilson retired from policing in Canada.

In 2016 and 2017 Terry Wilson was a Lead Investigator with the Independent Police Complaints Commission (IPCC) for the Hillsborough disaster. This investigation is the largest police corruption investigation in UK history. At the completion of the Coroners inquest and the criminal investigation, which resulted in multiple criminal charges, Wilson left the IPCC.

In March 2018 Wilson was highlighted in the World Class Investigators podcast.

From May 2018 to Sept 2019 Terry Wilson worked for the UK Ministry of Defence conducting investigations into Harassment and Bullying activity by Service and Non Service personnel.

Wilson presently consults on Hate Crimes, Human Rights, Gender-based violence and Harassment.

== Post-Police Career ==
Wilson has moved to Florence, Italy and runs a business called Smart Move Italy.
