= Medway High School =

Medway High School may refer to:

- Medway High School (Massachusetts)
- Medway High School (Arva, Ontario)
