= Voaden =

Voaden is an English language surname.

== People with the surname ==
- Arthur Voaden (?-1931), Canadian doctor
- Caroline Voaden (born 1968), British politician
- Herman Voaden (1903–1991), Canadian playwright and politician
