= Gabriel Dumont =

Gabriel Dumont may refer to:

- Gabriel Dumont (ice hockey) (born 1990), Canadian professional ice hockey player
- Gabriel Dumont (Métis leader) (1837–1906), leader of the Métis people

== See also ==
- Gabriel Dumont Institute, a post-secondary educational institution in Saskatchewan, Canada
- École secondaire Gabriel-Dumont, a public French first language high school in London, Ontario, Canada
