= Oakridge Acres =

- Neighbourhood
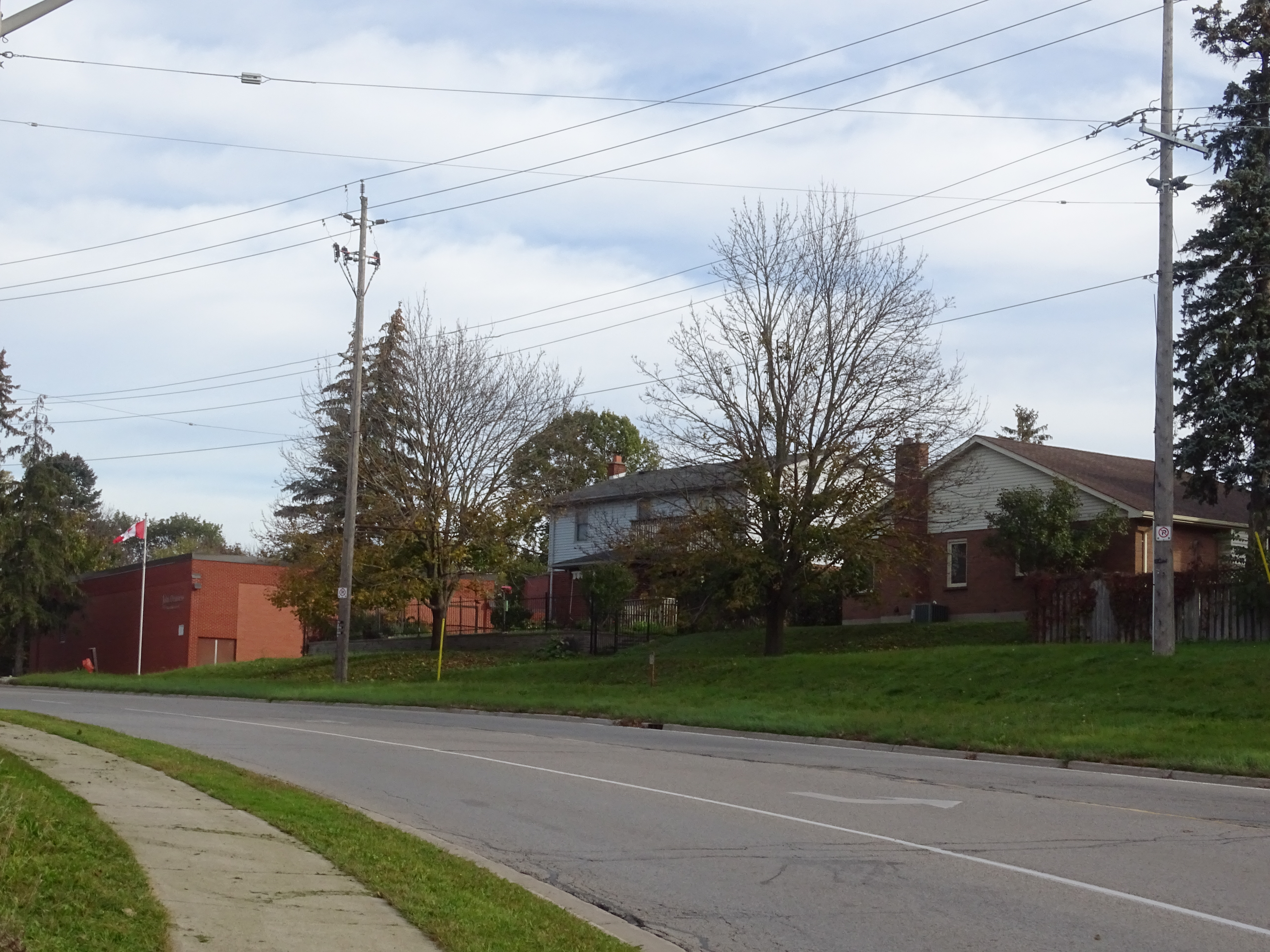
- Sanatorium Road in the southwest corner of the neighbourhood

- Location within Ontario
- Coordinates: 42°57′14″N 81°19′56″W
- Country: Canada
- Province: Ontario
- City: London
- Settled: 1950

Government
  - Type: Municipal (Ward 8)
  - Administrative body: London City Council
  - Councillor: Steve Lehman
- Elevation: 254 m (833 ft)

Population (2011)
  - Total: 16,730
  - Average Income: $53,925
- Time zone: UTC-5 (Eastern Time Zone)
  - Summer (DST): UTC-6 (Eastern Time Zone)
- Postal Code: N6B
- Area codes: 519, 226

Oakridge Acres is a neighbourhood in north-west of the City of London, Ontario, Canada. It is north of Westmount and north-east of Byron. The neighbourhood comprises the subdivisions of Oakridge Acres, Oakridge Park, Oakridge Meadows (also known as Huntington), Thornwood Estates, Hunt Club Green, Hazelden, and Hazelden Park. Almost all of its residents live in low-density, single detached dwellings. As of 2011, the area is home to 16,730 residents. The neighbourhood is considered a middle to upper-income area, with an average family income of $124,966 an average dwelling value of $319,726 and a home ownership rate of 89%.

== History ==
Oakridge Acres was developed starting on October 12, 1950, by Sifton Properties consisting of 1,649 units spanning 74 acres. Oakridge Park was added in a second phase in the early 1960s. In 1963 Oakridge's Sifton Bog was donated to the City of London.

Located within the subdivision of Hazelden is Hazelden Manor (from which the subdivision's name is derived) at 1132 St. Anthony Road. This home was built in 1892 by Colonel John William Little, who would later become mayor of London, and renovated in 1929. Due to the historical significance and preservation of this building, it was designated as a Heritage Property.

== Government and politics ==
Oakridge exists within the federal electoral district of London West. It is currently represented by Arielle Kayabaga of the Liberal Party of Canada, first elected in 2021.

Provincially, the area is within the constituency of London West. It is currently represented by Peggy Sattler of the New Democratic Party, first elected in 2013 and re-elected in 2014, 2018, and 2022.

In London's non-partisan municipal politics, Oakridge lies within ward 8. It is currently represented by Councillor Steve Lehman, first elected in 2018.

== Education ==
There are ten schools located in the neighbourhood from 3 different school boards.

=== Thames Valley District School Board ===
- Riverside Public School
- Clara Brenton Public School
- John Dearness Public School
- Westoaks French Immersion Public School
- Oakridge Secondary School

=== London District Catholic School Board ===
- St. Paul Catholic School
- Notre Dame Catholic School
- St. Thomas Aquinas Secondary School

=== Conseil scolaire Viamonde ===
- Ecole Marie Curie

=== Private ===
- Matthews Hall
