= Sir Wilfrid Laurier Secondary School =

Sir Wilfrid Laurier Secondary School may refer to:

- Sir Wilfrid Laurier Secondary School (London, Ontario), a secondary school in London, Ontario
- Sir Wilfrid Laurier Secondary School (Ottawa), a secondary school in Ottawa, Ontario
