= B. Davison Secondary School =

Location
- 785 Trafalgar St; London, Ontario, N5Z 1E6; Canada; 42°58′38″N 81°13′09″W

Information
- School type: Public
- Established: 2014
- School board: Thames Valley District School Board
- Superintendent: Paul Sydor
- Area trustee: Lori-Ann Pizzolato, Sheri Polhill
- Principal: Renee Shave
- Grades: 9 to 12
- Enrollment: 170
- Language: English
- Website: bdavison.tvdsb.ca/en/index.aspx

B. Davison Secondary School (formerly known as Thames Secondary School) is a vocational high school in London, Ontario, Canada. It was established in 2014 after amalgamating the former Sir George Ross and Thames Secondary Schools. The school is named after the late Basil Davison, a former teacher, and offers workplace courses in auto mechanics, construction, cosmetology, horticulture, hospitality, and welding.

In 2022, it was announced that the school would be "repurposed," with student enrollment being paused. In 2025, it was announced that B. Davison would become an adult education school upon renovations, with the G.A. Wheable Adult, Alternative and Continuing Education School closing in 2026.

== See also ==
- Education in Ontario
- List of secondary schools in Ontario
