= Women in peacekeeping =

Women's roles and impact within peacekeeping efforts

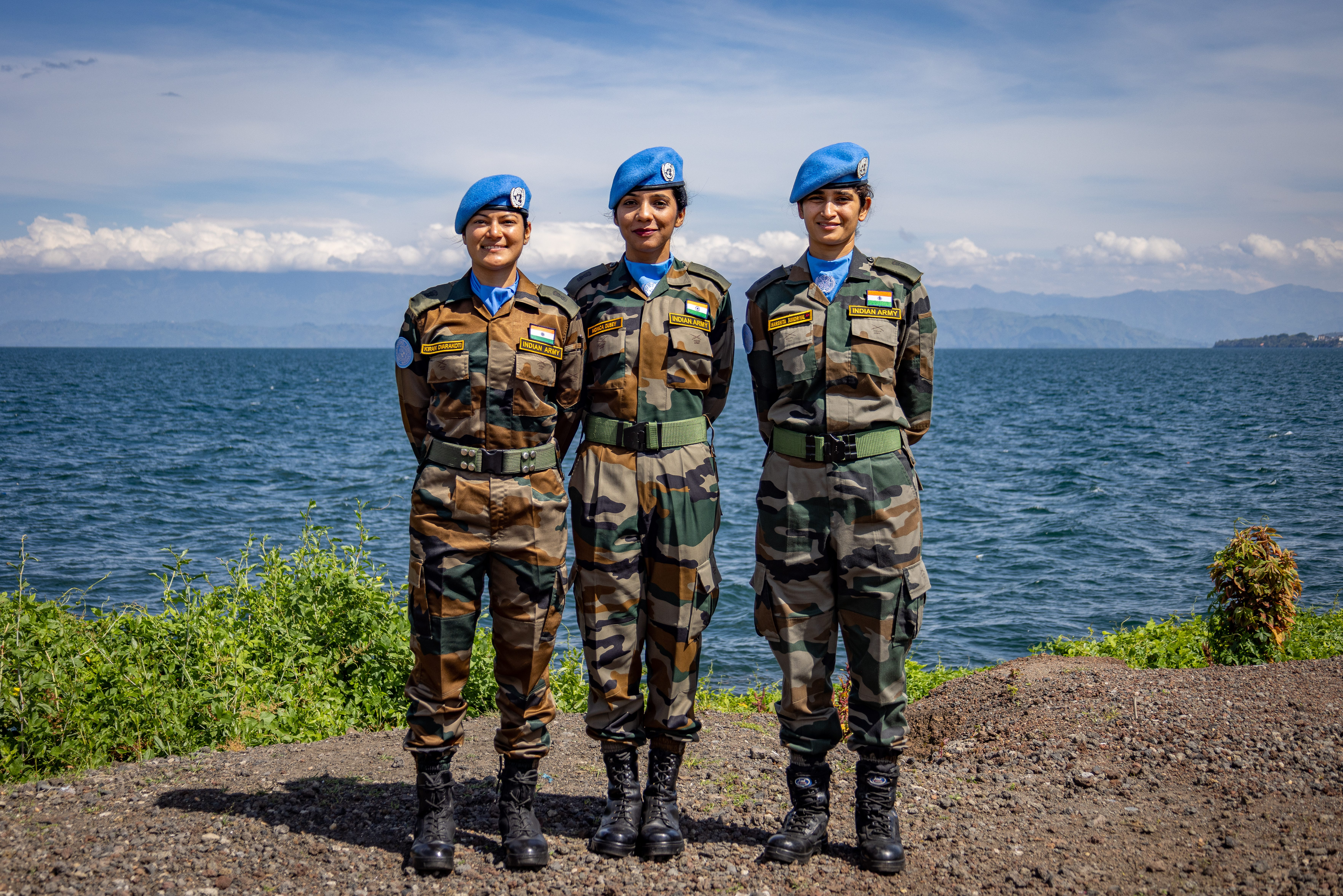
Three female UN Peacekeepers from the Indian Army celebrate International Day of United Nations Peacekeepers 2023 in Goma, North Kivu, DRC

Women have participated in global peacekeeping efforts, including operations led by the United Nations. Although participation increased substantially from the 1990s onward, women remained significantly underrepresented in peacekeeping operations as of the early 2020s. Participation rates vary considerably across military contingents, military observers, staff officers and police units.

Researchers and international organizations have argued that including women in peacekeeping can improve access to local communities, particularly women and girls, and aid in addressing issues such as conflict-related sexual violence. Some studies associate higher proportions of women personnel with improved mission outcomes. Women in peacekeeping also face documented challenges, including gender stereotyping, unequal access to training and advancement, and harassment in male-dominated environments.

In October 2000, the UN Security Council adopted Resolution 1325 on women, peace, and security, which recognized the disproportionate impact of armed conflict on women and girls and called for the adoption of a gender perspective across conflict response, repatriation, reintegration, and post-conflict reconstruction.

== Effects of women's participation in peacekeeping ==
External videos
- " Women In Peacekeeping" – United Nations (YouTube) (2:20 min)

A rise in women's participation in peacekeeping significantly contributes to an increase in safety and security. Effects include wider dissemination to civilians by acting as a safe environment to report abuses such as sexual violence. There are circumstances in which certain settings are not disclosed to men and women peacekeepers aid in acquiring intelligence regarding such events within the local population. These circumstances coincide with women peacekeepers examining women combatants during disarmament, demobilization, and reintegration procedures. Dispute resolutions are enriched due to women peacekeepers' decreased reliance on undue force compared to male peacekeepers. Gender parity within peacekeeping acts as diversification within missions giving rise to participation empowerment and a rise in a mission capacity. For instance, the percentage of women in Liberian national security forces increased from 6 percent to 17 percent over a period of nine years; this was attributed to all-female police units having been present in the United Nations Mission in Liberia. The backlash factor leads to increased visibility; women in peacekeeping subvert the cultural expectations of women within states where peacekeeping occurs. Women become inspired by these roles that women peacekeepers take on as they go against the societal norm and illustrate that such actions are possible.

According to Neville Melvin Gertze of Namibia, speaking at an October 2019 meeting of the United Nations Security Council, peace agreements that are the result of negotiations including women are 35 percent more likely to last at least 15 years than those which are the result of men-only negotiations. At the same meeting, United Nations Secretary-General António Guterres stated that women were excluded from peace processes, attacks against women human rights defenders had increased, and only a "tiny percentage" of funding for peacebuilding was given to women's organisations.

=== Gender gap statistics in UN peacekeeping ===
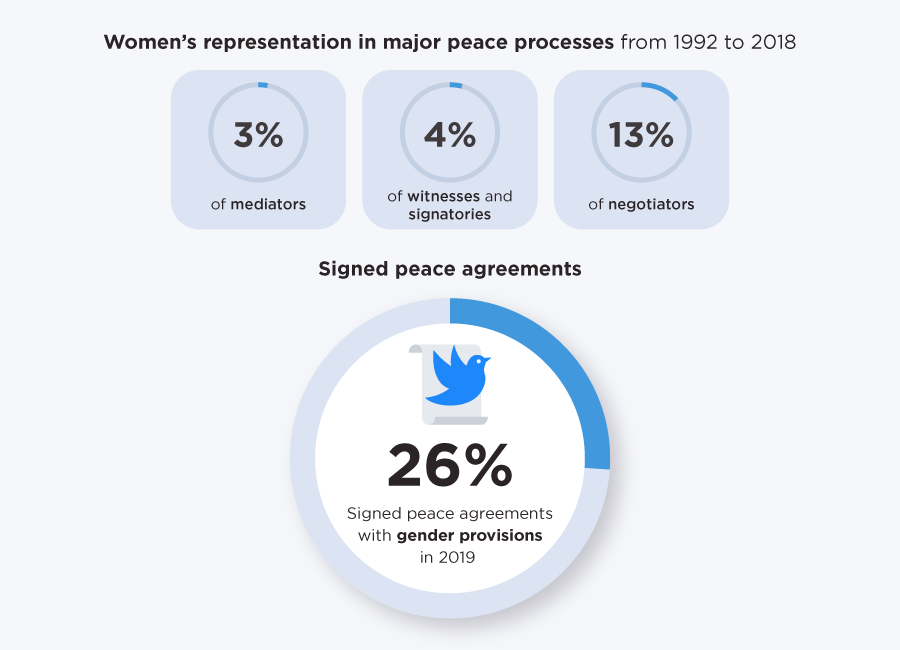
Women's representation in major peace processes from 1992 to 2018

As of October 2022, women constituted about 6% of military personnel. In January 2021, women constituted 11% of police units and 28% of individual police in peacekeeping missions. These numbers underrepresent women, but are greater than the 1% women's component of overall uniformed peacekeeping personnel in 1993.

The 2028 target is for women to constitute 15% of military contingents, 20% of police units, and 30% of individual police officers.

== UNSCR 1325 ==
United Nations Security Council Resolution 1325 (UNSCR 1325) establishes four pillars: Participation, Protection, Prevention, and Relief and Recovery. Participation aims to increase women's involvement in UN peacekeeping operations. Protection seeks to better safeguard civilians from sexual exploitation and gender-based violence. Prevention entails enhancing protocols for mediating violence against women in conjunction with assisting local women's peace measures, reinforcing women's rights, and ensuring repercussions for those who infringe on international law. Relief and recovery commit assistance through a gendered perspective in times of crisis.

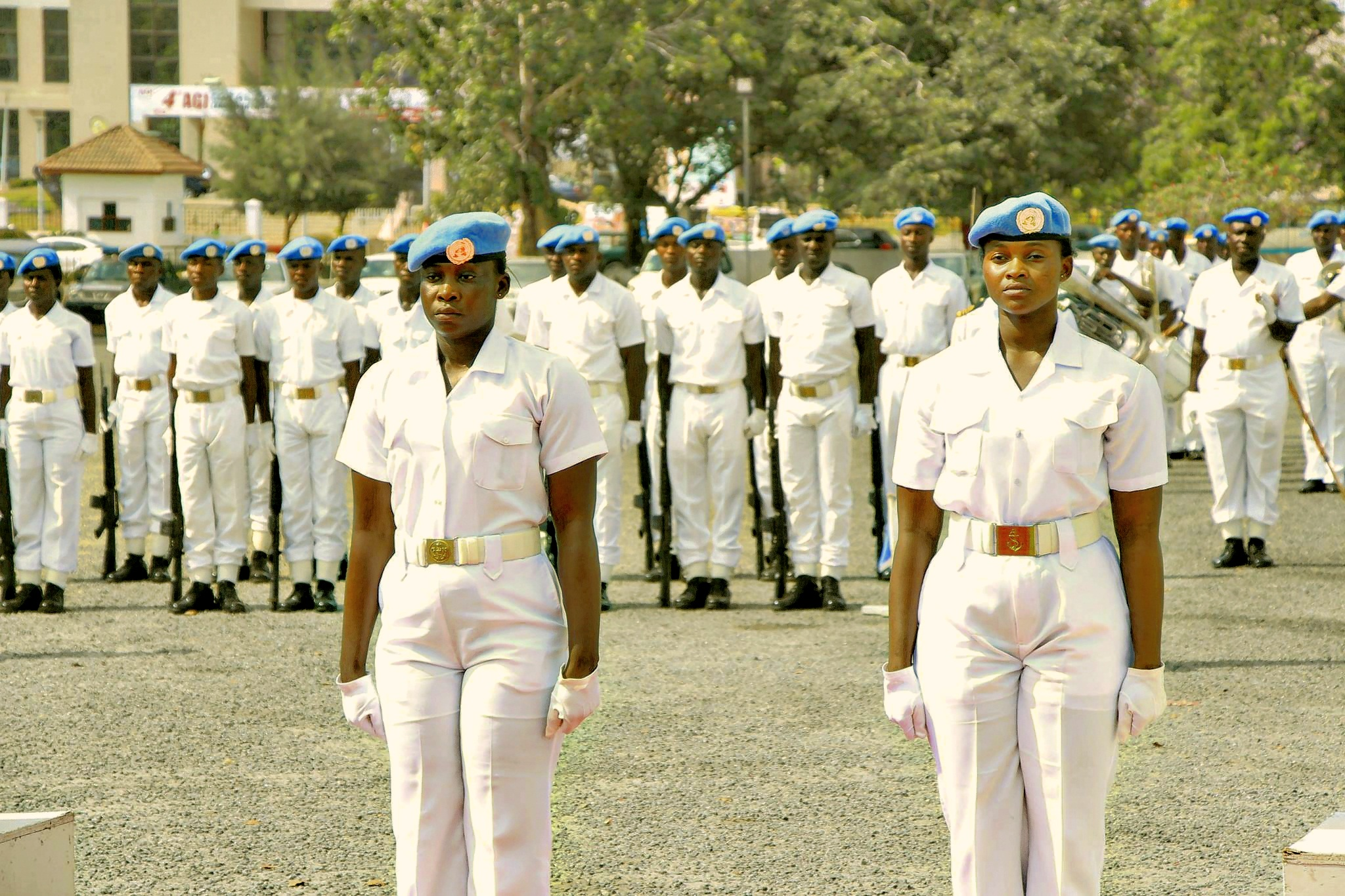
Ghanaian women serving as UN Peacekeepers

The United Nations Security Council Resolution 1325 calls for states to initiate specific protocols to safeguard women and girls from gender-based crimes, specifically rape and sexual abuse. In 1975, the Decade for Women was established, which marked the beginning of the Women, Peace, and Security strategy. There was a renewed call for action after the genocides in Rwanda and Bosnia. Resolution 1325 supports implementation of the Women, Peace, and Security Strategy, which addresses the role of gender and the term gender mainstreaming, the incorporation of an outlook on gender regarding topics such as security. Women's participation in peacekeeping is considered vital to implementing safety and security through a series of mission improvements. There is greater diversity, first-hand accounts, and precedent for more women peacekeepers. With more women participating in missions, there are more opportunities for reform because of experiencing the indirect effects of issues such as war.

== Women in non-UN peacekeeping ==
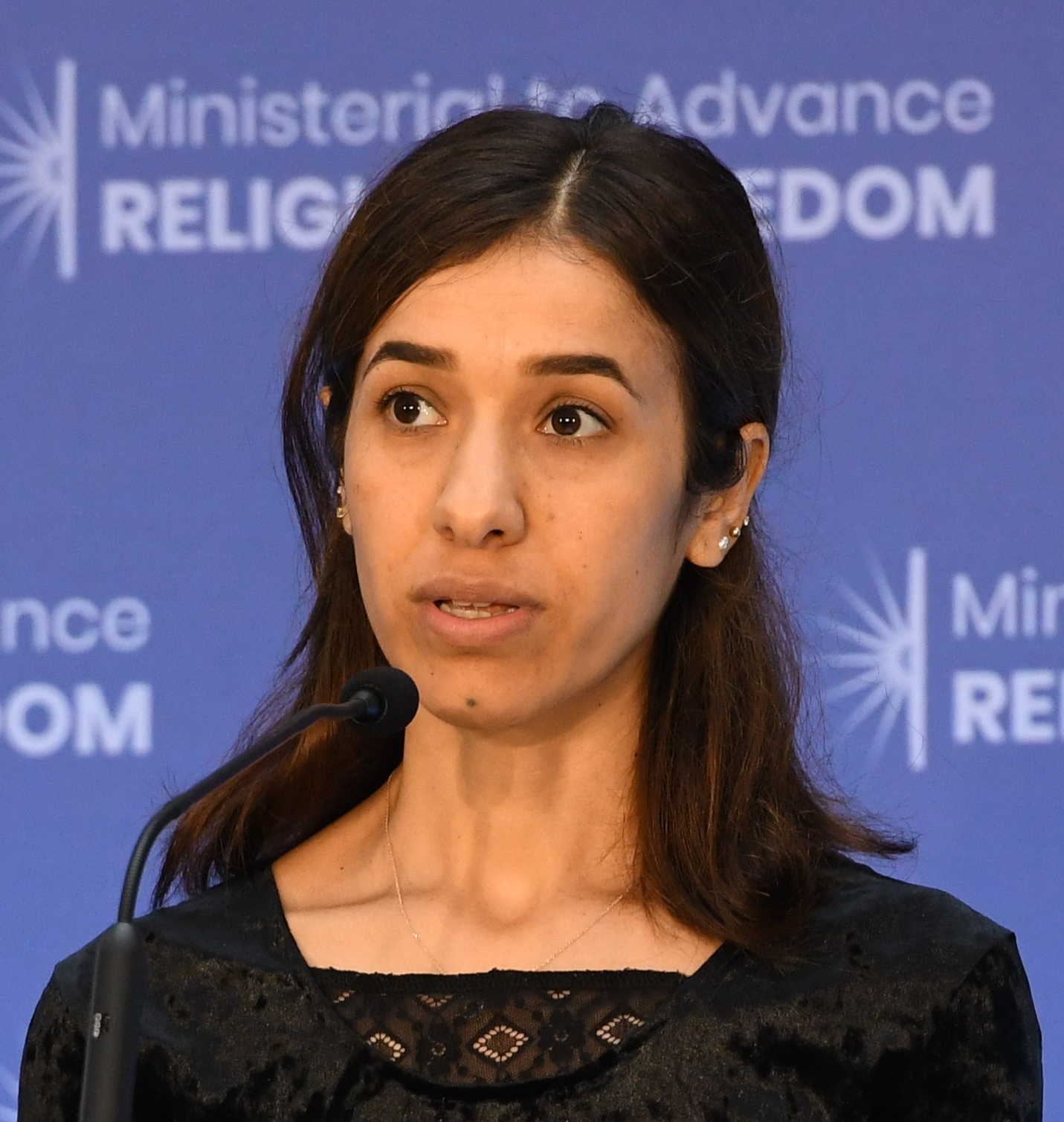
Nadia Murad was awarded the Nobel Peace Prize for "efforts to end the use of sexual violence as a weapon of war and armed conflict.

Outside the UN, women have also been involved in peacebuilding as well as peacekeeping. Women set up different organizations in local areas, calling on society to stop violence and maintain peace. For example, women have been fighting in the front line of peacekeeping, shuttling between the two sides of the conflict, actively coordinating and organizing peace negotiations, and promoting peaceful development in countries including the Philippines. Women also provide psychological counseling and living assistance to refugees and victims. Through these actions, women let the media and the world know that their efforts are proving the importance of peace.

It is not easy for women to participate in peacekeeping outside the UN, but there are still some factors that motivate them to take part in the work. From the perspective of individual women, the danger to life, gender-based violence, and disruption of education all drive women to stop conflicts and wars. When leaders of the government and the armed forces are not promoting peace, women have come forward and participated in peacekeeping work. From a community perspective, women are more likely than men to reject hierarchy within their group, further promoting women to build peace across differences. From the perspective of the warring parties, women as intermediaries are perceived as honest and less threatening, which leads to women's access to warring parties' leaders and facilitates negotiations.

Examples of women's peacekeeping work outside the UN:

- Visaka Dharmadasa, the founder of Parents of Servicemen Missing in Action and the Association of War-Affected Women
- Women of Liberia Mass Action for Peace
- PAIMAN Alumni Trust
- Voice of Libyan Women
- Realizing Inclusion in Practice: The Philippines

== Challenges ==
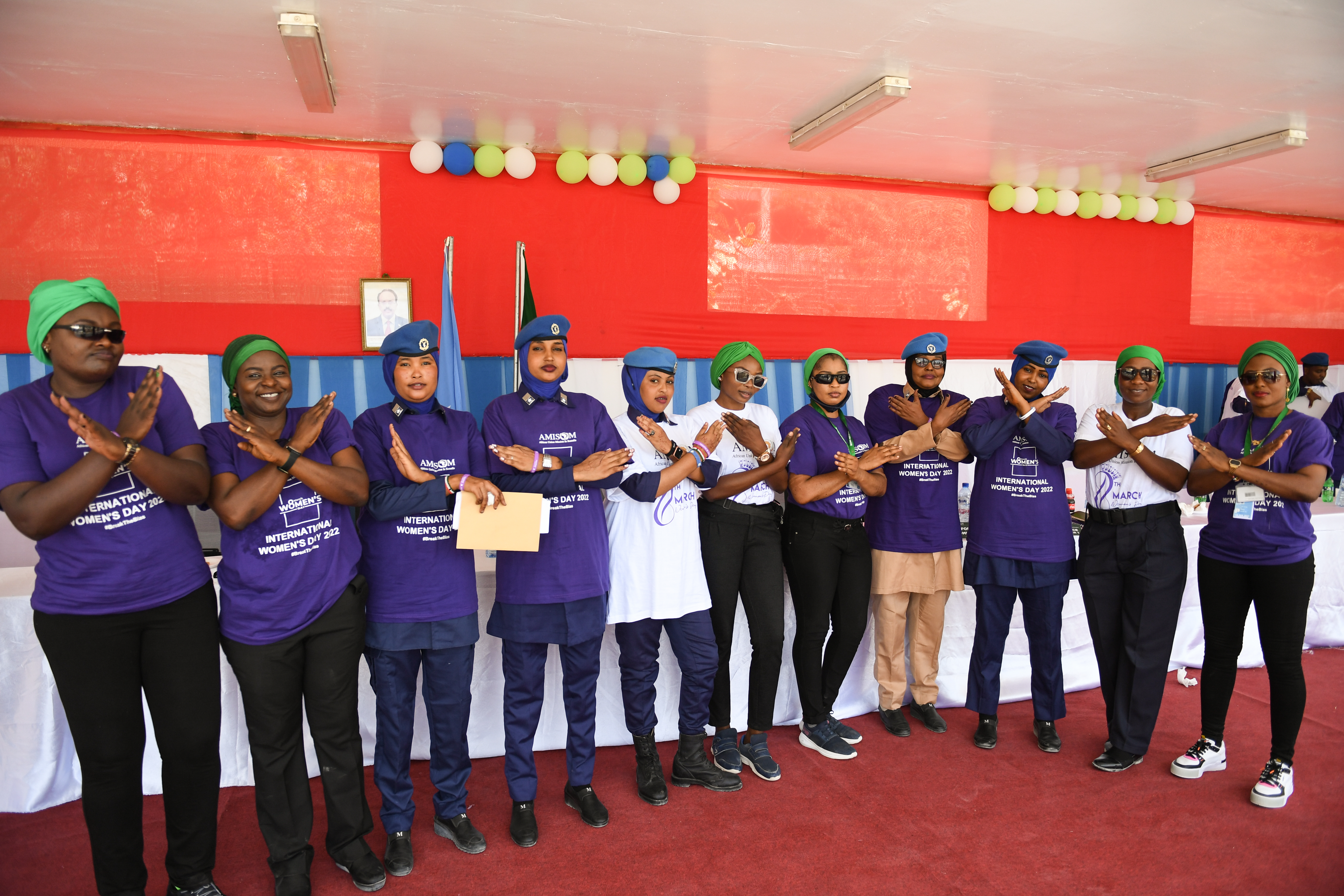
African Union Mission to Somalia female officers

Women in peacekeeping face significant challenges, such as unsafe working environments, unequal access to opportunities, lack of information regarding missions, and lack of resources. Women peacekeepers are often deployed without sufficient information and training; this leads to peacekeepers dealing with dangers when they happen rather than being knowledgeable on what steps to take prior to such circumstances. At the same time, compared with their peers, women participating in peacekeeping generally lack the special training for the roles they are required to play and have fewer opportunities for promotion. More broadly, lack of data is also a challenge, as many contributing countries do not provide information on the number of women in the ranks. Secondly, the goals set for female participants are difficult to fully achieve. Of the countries currently sending women peacekeepers, only five have met their goals. The UN has not given more resources to achieve a higher female participation rate. Part of the challenge is what role women should play when they participate in peacekeeping, rather than simply being "tools" for equality between men and women. It is also likely that some sending countries prefer to have short-term women members to avoid punishment or gain rewards from UN, rather than actually getting more women involved in peacekeeping in the long term. Finally, women's status in peacekeeping will be labeled and their achievements will be weakened or erased. In many UN documents, women are labeled as "vulnerable groups". Such a narrow definition would limit women to be treated only as victims in need of protection, rather than participating in their own protection or the struggle for peace, national liberation and independence.

Women's participation in peacekeeping outside the UN also faces problems and difficulties. First, women's peacekeeping is sometimes ineffective by the fact that operations are ad hoc and decentralized, limited to public marches or observation. Second, lack of funding prevents women from further peacekeeping operations. These restrictions include women's inability to attract more people to join, limited activity locations, and limited activity forms.

=== COVID-19 pandemic ===
External videos
- "Women peacekeepers are responding to COVID-19" – United Nations (YouTube) (1:33min)

The COVID-19 pandemic posed a significant challenge to UN peacekeepers. UN women peacekeepers are an important integral part of the peacekeeping process and faced the challenge directly. Women peacekeepers contributed to promoting scientific protection knowledge, providing local medical services, and distributing supplies. Furthermore, women peacekeepers not only actively participated in peace and political processes, but also promoted the integration of gender into response planning under the COVID-19 pandemic.

In 2020, the head of UN Women stated that further participation and leadership of female peacekeepers would be crucial to advancing peace processes and promoting gender equality in the context of the COVID-19 pandemic.

== See also ==
- List of women pacifists and peace activists
- List of peace activists
- Women's International League for Peace and Freedom
- List of women's rights activists
