= École élémentaire Marie-Curie =

Location
- London, Ontario; Canada; 42.975°N 81.328°W

Information
- School type: Elementary
- Motto: Savoir faire et bien faire ensemble
- Founded: 1972
- School board: Conseil scolaire Viamonde
- Superintendent: Jennifer Lamarche Schmalz
- Principal: Maryse Héroux
- Language: French
- Colours: Black, Silver and White
- Mascot: The Owl
- Website: mariecurie.csviamonde.ca
- Last updated: June 1, 2006

École élémentaire Marie-Curie, previously known as London French School and École Alexandra, is a public French-language elementary school in London, Ontario, Canada. It is operated by the Conseil scolaire Viamonde and teaches from junior kindergarten to Grade 6.

It is located on Hunt Club Drive off Oxford Street West in the north-western neighbourhood of Oakridge.

== History ==
London has a small francophone population at about 28,000 people or 7.4% as of 2016, but became eligible for French learning institutions when the Government of Ontario amended the Education Act in 1968 to officially recognize French-language schools in the province.

Marie Curie opened in 1972 under the name of "London French School" and was located downtown on King Street. It was soon renamed "École Alexandra" after Princess Alexandra. It was the first French-language school in London and initially taught kindergarten to Grade 8. The school moved to its current Hunt Club Drive location for the 1981–1982 school year, and the aging older building was demolished. As the first French school in London, it became popularly and informally known simply as "École."

In the early 1990s, the then-principal, Jean-Claude Imbeault, made a number of changes to the school. The school renamed to "École élémentaire Marie-Curie" after the Polish-French physicist Marie Curie in 1994. The school colours were changed from blue and white to black, silver and white. The school was also given new logo and the motto "Savoir faire et bien faire".

From 1979 until 1999, graduating students from the school who wanted to continue their studies in French attended the Module scolaire de langue française (MSLF), which shared a building with the English-language London Central Secondary School. In September 1999, the MSLF was renamed to École secondaire Gabriel-Dumont moved to share buildings with the French Catholic high school, École secondaire catholique Monseigneur-Bruyère of the Conseil scolaire catholique Providence. During this transition, Grades 7 and 8 from Marie-Curie moved to Gabriel-Dumont.

== Notable alumni ==
Notable alumni include:

- Jeffrey Buttle, figure skater
- Jordan Prentice, actor

== See also ==
- École secondaire Gabriel-Dumont
- List of schools in London, Ontario
