= Gender crime =

Hate crime committed against a specific gender

A gender crime is a hate crime committed against a specific gender. Gender crimes may include rape, genital mutilation, forced prostitution, and forced pregnancy. Often gender crimes are committed during armed conflict or during times of political upheaval or instability. Some examples of these conflicts include the Yugoslavian Civil War and the Rwandan genocide.

Gender crime is not universally recognized as a category of hate crime but is increasingly being included in the United States as a category in state and federal hate crime laws. Internationally, most gender crimes committed during times of war are recognized as war crimes as set forth by the Fourth Geneva Convention. Revenge porn and other online behavior are also seen as hate crimes. Criminologists have also pioneered the specific discipline of criminal victimization which could be considered one of many major factors contributing to gender crimes. For example, there is a greater likelihood of women in comparison to men who are victims of a familiar person, in most cases a man that they know, instead of a stranger.

== Causes of gender crime ==
Many factors contribute to the framework that supports gendered crimes. Gender influences multiple social practices, including the organization of power structures and privilege in society. Thus, gendered violence and crime is a direct result of this concept and the structures that support it. Structural violence derives from institutions that create and entrench inequality, thus providing a space for gender crimes. There are many examples of these institutions and their legacies. For example: Christian nations colonized Canada, justifying their actions with their religion. Their influence developed the country into the nation it is today, but also created oppressive systems. The colonizing Christian nations helped to set up capitalism in Canada, and combined with colonial ideals, capitalism oppresses Indigenous peoples, especially women. As a result, minority groups are forced to function under a system that actively oppresses them, with standards regarding race, gender, and class that they are expected to measure up to but inevitably do not. Hate crimes are usually committed based on a perceived difference or violation of social norms, making these people especially vulnerable. In capitalist economies, the idea that a person works hard and is rewarded is highlighted. However, when looked at more closely it can be seen that those at the "top" of society often have advantages over those at the "bottom" of society. One example is the pay gap between men and women in Canada, which provides men with an economic advantage. Those with money often hold power, so they keep lobbying for their own causes while those without money are ignored. Instead of being paid for excelling at the job or holding the same position, men are paid more based on their gender, making it more difficult for women to succeed in society, and more likely for them to be placed in situations where they can become victims of gender crime.

The institutional and structural contributions to gender crime play a large part in the targeting of women, but stereotypical social ideals of masculinity and femininity also contribute. Societal structures such as those discussed above often lead to views that women are inferior or expendable. These notions of gender lead to different expected conduct between men and women. Men and women occupy separate social spheres, with women's sphere being largely related to domestic activities, while men handle work outside of the home. These spheres are created by ideals of masculinity and femininity, creating a separation between the genders. Narratives then arise that men should be aggressive and strong, taking what they want, especially sexually, contributing to the large rates of gender violence and crime. It is thought that men are supposed to be active, taking what they desire from the woman, leading to violence. Additionally, gender crimes or gender violence can be used to demonstrate masculinity, reasserting the power structure created by large institutions.

The intent is not to accuse or demonize men, but instead to recognize the social institutions and legacies that lead to notions of gender practice that help to perpetrate gendered violence and crime against women.

== Canadian gender crime ==
Canada is also affected by the institutions that give the framework for gender crimes in society. The overview below regarding the last fifty years of gender crime in Canada examines both changes in institutional crimes and violence against women, but also physical or individual crimes against women.

=== The 1970s ===
This analysis begins in the 1970s, when women were largely bound by gender expectations and stereotypes, but second wave feminism was beginning to change the narrative. In fact, at this time, advertisements of women working, especially in jobs that were thought to be typical of men received backlash, for fear of women at work becoming mainstream. As a result, in the 1970s women were often seen portrayed in the home, as product users, and submissive to men. However, second wave feminism began pushing a movement that demanded the right for equality. A large part of second wave feminists were middle class white women, who used their privilege to fight for their cause. Unfortunately, as a result, non white women's voices were not heard. The goals of second wave feminism were to gain equality in employment, law, government, and education, as well as ending violence against women. Reforms of systems that helped to oppress women, like the legal system and the government were also called for.

Additionally, the Report of the Royal Commission on the Status of Women in Canada was released, highlighting issues facing women in eight categories. This report focused on improving the institutions of society that were oppressing women, achieving more autonomy for women, female presence in politics, universal childcare, and improving the wage gap. This report has been active for the last fifty years, setting out the path for gender progress.

Violence was often an unnamed issue, and it was widely believed that women were doing something to deserve it, whether that be the way they dressed, spoke, or if they were thought to provoke their partner. In response, Take Back the Night Marches were on the rise, in order to protest sexual violence and rape of women. By the end of the 1970s, federal attention had been received, and combatting violence against women was a cornerstone identification of the Towards Equality plan. Contained in this plan also were recommendations of maternity leave for both parents, parental benefits, opening all jobs in the Armed Forces to women, eliminating job barriers for women and improving their participation, providing federal training programs for women, pursuing equal pay, using non sexist language in lawmaking, and giving funding to women's health research. Through the 1970s, attention towards issues facing women was gained, and next steps were outlined.

==== The 1980s ====
During the late 1970s moving into the 1980s, violence against women, particularly wife battering, was combatted through transition houses. A transition house was meant to provide a woman with the shelter and necessities she needed to escape from an abusive situation. This lowered the rates for gender crimes, particularly femicide, by providing women with a place to go. A study found that abuse of women often is not an isolated incident, occurring more than once, which can lead to an eventual homicide when a woman has no way to escape. The establishment of transition houses also provided networks for women to get help, giving connections to police or help lines as well.

Many women's magazines also provided women with resources in the form of editorials and articles that educated them about feminist issues such as birth control, laws on divorce, abortion, the influence of women in politics, and ending violence against women. Section 28 of the Canadian Charter of Rights and Freedoms outlined gender equality and was put into effect in 1982. It guarantees that the rights and freedoms described in the Charter will be given equally to both men and women. In 1983, the Criminal Code of Canada was also changed to include marital rape, making it an offence. Slowly, other voices of women were beginning to be heard, including Indigenous women, LGBTQ women, and women of colour. Success also came in the form of Canada's first governor general, Jeanne Sauvé, who served from 1984 to 1990. In 1985, Bill C-31 amended the Indian Act and allowed Indigenous women to regain status if they had lost it through marriage, addressing some issues that disadvantaged Indigenous women. In the context of feminism of the late 1980s, it was realized that women of colour's voices had been silenced, and that intersectional applications of oppression also contributed to the problems women were facing. It was not just the patriarchy, but also large structures of society that needed to be focused on.

=== The 1990s ===
The 1990s were swept by 3rd wave feminism, a revolution of the concept that brought women of colour into the picture and began to undertake issues that faced racialized women - such as those coupled with race, class, and sexuality. Third wave feminism took a more intersectional approach in order to understand and complete its goals. These feminists also wanted to smash barriers facing people regarding their sexuality, race, and class, while also redefining the traditional notions of what is masculine or feminine. Stories of perseverance through violence and sharing their experiences united the group and made others feel supported. Women's studies programs were being developed at universities, and third wave feminists used the irony of sexist arguments to advertise their views. In the media, portrayals of women were now more focused on smart, independent girls that were leaders.

However, in Canada in 1998, on average, women still made $5.17 less an hour than men, and even though women in the workforce were more likely to have less children, have a secure career before having children, and return to work more quickly after having children, they were still facing a gap in wages.

To fight against gender based violence and crimes, the 16 Days of Activism Against Gender-based Violence was developed, to make voices heard and reaffirm the commitment to ending gender violence. In 1993, the UN adopted the Declaration on the Elimination of Violence against Women, recognizing the violence as an obstacle to equality and peace, and set out to combat it. Additionally, in 1999 the International Day for the Elimination of Violence Against Women was designated.

==== The 2000s onward ====
The third wave of feminism carried on through the 2000s until around 2012, where a highly debated fourth wave of feminism emerged. Some say that the fourth wave is simply still the third wave of feminism, but others argue for the influence of social media and the focus of the fourth wave on sexual harassment, rape, and body shaming. The Me Too Movement was launched in 2006, as a way to support those who had gone through instances of sexual violence and providing a platform for the voices of survivors to be heard. However, there is still work to be done because sexual assault is still one of the only violent crimes in Canada that is not declining.

In reference to wages, on average, in 1998 women made $5.17 less an hour than men, while in 2018 they make only $4.13 less than their male coworkers, which can be attributed to their increased involvement in work and achievements in education. Most recently, as of 2022, for full time employees women make 90 cents for every dollar a man makes. While this gap is narrowing, its presence shows that the work is still not done.

Women are still more likely than men to be sexually assaulted, and have multiple instances of this assault. In Canada, the violent crime rate for women 24 and younger was three times higher in Northern Canada compared to Southern Canada. Within Northern Canada, young women were targeted twice that of young men. Additionally, in 2020, women were eight times more likely to be killed by a spouse than men were. The COVID pandemic also caused a spike in the rates of homicides of women. The rates of gender related homicide of women have declined since 2001, but during the pandemic between 2020 and 2021 the rates increased by 14%. Violence against women skyrocketed during the pandemic because abusers could stay at home more, abusers were stressed and took it out on women, and there was increased substance consumption during isolation. In fact, violence and crimes against women tend to increase during crisis in general. Injuries sustained by women during the pandemic were also more serious than they had been before, as reported by Canadian women's shelters. Before the pandemic, a woman was killed by a partner once a week, while during the pandemic femicides were happening nearly every one and a half days. As of 2022, research from the World Health Organization has also shown that 25 to 33% of women will experience some time of violence in their life.

An intersectional example of violent crime against women prevalent in Canada are the Murdered and Missing Indigenous Women. Despite making up only 5% of the population, 21% of gender related homicide victims were Indigenous in 2021. Also, when victims were Indigenous and younger more of them died by being beaten. In 2015 the National Inquiry into Missing and Murdered Indigenous Women and Girls was launched, in order to investigate the high levels of violence faced by this group. The final report finds that Indigenous rights violations caused by the institutions in our society have led to the massive amount of Indigenous women being targeted, and calls for social and legal change to help end the violence. Their calls to justice include addressing intergenerational trauma as well as social and economic marginaization. However, women and girls are still facing violence and going missing.

Recently in 2022, the government of Canada announced its support of the 10 year National Action Plan to End Gender Based Violence, an outline with goals to change social norms causing gender based violence, address socioeconomic factors causing violence, and provide resources for those experiencing violence. Support in the form of empowerment, prevention in the form of education, addressing the justice system, working with Indigenous people, and implementing social infrastructure that prevents gender based violence are all pillars of this plan.

Although progress has definitely been made from the 1970s, the elimination of gender crimes and violence is truly a journey, and there are still issues surrounding it that need to be focused on today. As seen through the analysis, the persistence of the wage gap and the need for multiple waves of feminism proves that societal structures oppressing women have not yet been dismantled. Additionally, the issues seen today in Canada pertaining to gender crimes and violence, especially against Indigenous women show that although past issues may have been solved, the present ones still require active attention.

== See also ==
- Femicide
- Sexism
- Prosecution of gender-targeted crimes
- Rape during the Rwandan Genocide
- MMIW
