= East Elgin Secondary School =

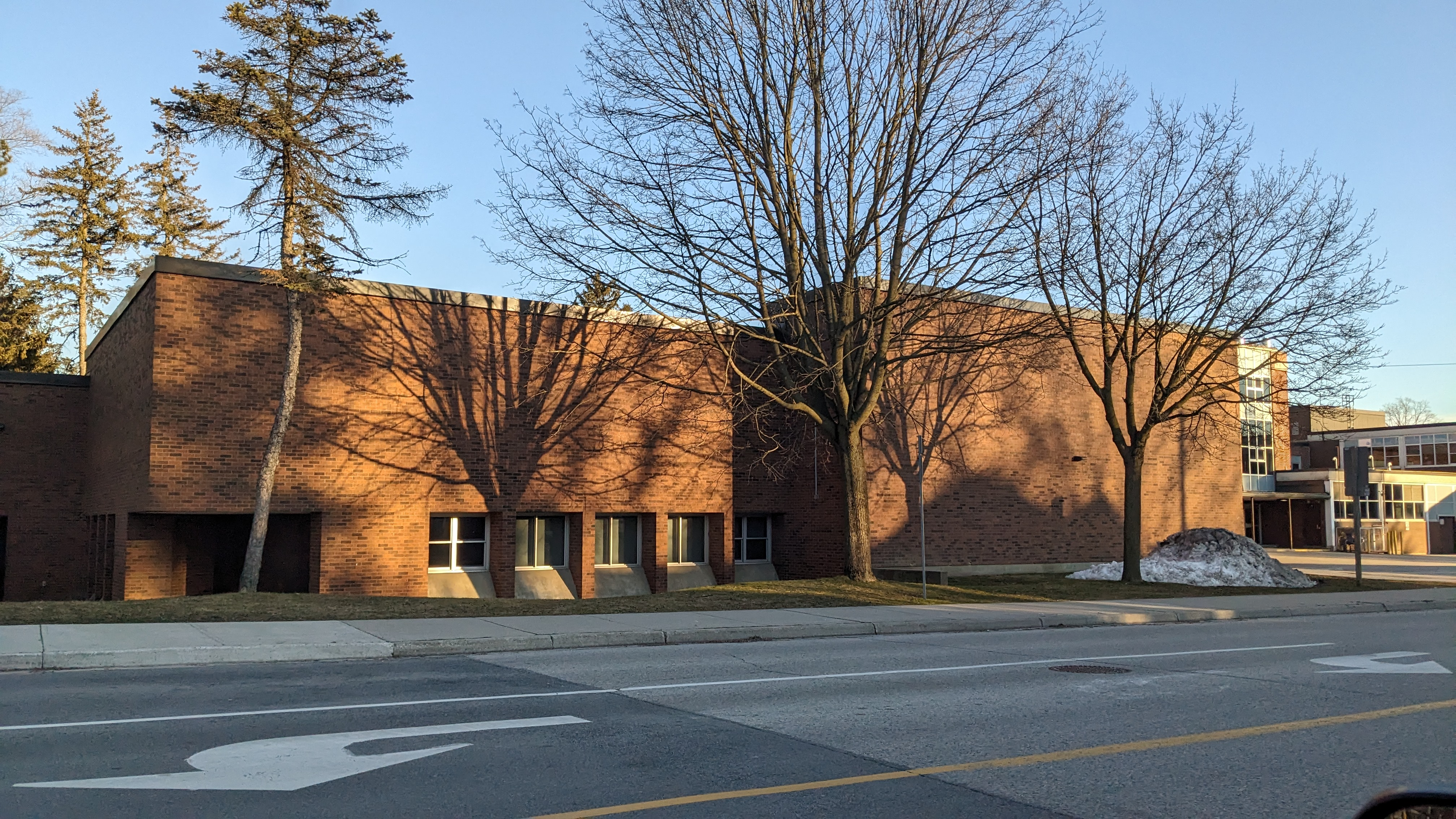

Location
- 362 Talbot St. W. Aylmer, Ontario, N5H 1K6; Canada; 42.773150°N 80.991608°W

Information
- School type: Secondary
- School board: Thames Valley District School Board
- Principal: D. Chisholm
- Grades: 9–12
- Enrollment: 1,165 (2019/2020)
- Language: English
- Colours: Purple and Gold
- Mascot: Eagles
- Website: www.tvdsb.ca/EastElgin.cfm

East Elgin Secondary School is a composite secondary school located in Aylmer, Ontario, Canada. It serves pupils from Aylmer and its surrounding areas. The school is part of the Thames Valley District School Board, formerly known as the Elgin County Board of Education.

== History ==
The first high school in Aylmer was built in 1876 beside the elementary school at 68 Gravel Road South (now John Street South). In 1885, with plans for a new High School to be built, the building on Gravel Road was purchased by the Public School Board and became part of the elementary school. The new Aylmer High School opened in 1886 at 362 Talbot Street West. In 1890, the school was made into a Collegiate Institute. In the fall of 1937, the building was torn down and replaced by a new building, which serves as the central section of the current school on this site, now called East Elgin Secondary School; this building since undergone a number of renovations and expansions over the years.

== See also ==
- Education in Ontario
- List of secondary schools in Ontario
