= College Avenue Secondary School =

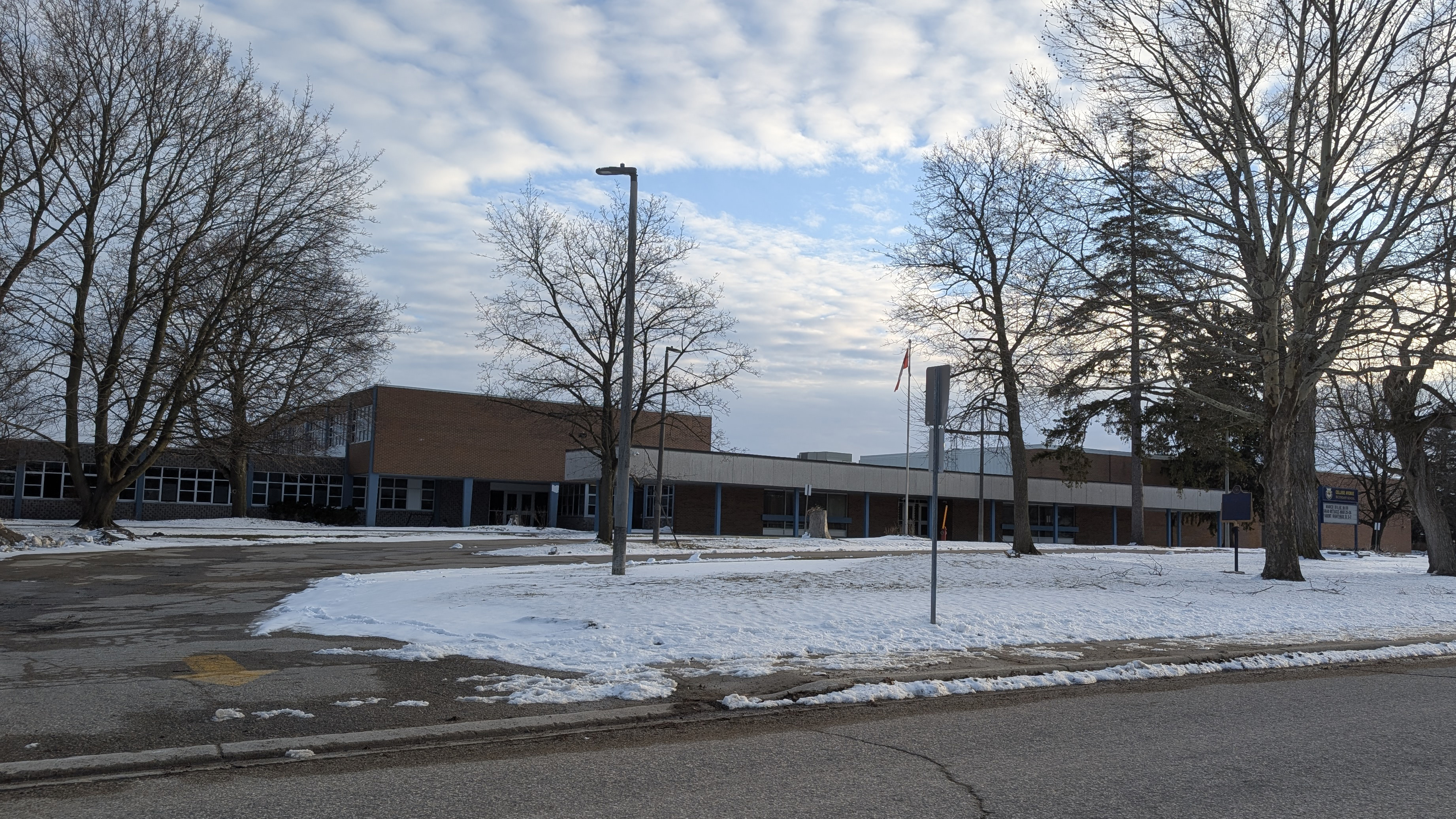

Location
- 700 College Ave. Woodstock, Ontario, N4S 2C8; Canada
- Coordinates: 43.12376°N 80.74543°W

Information
- School type: Public
- Founded: 1963
- School board: Thames Valley District School Board
- Area trustee: Dave Cripps
- Administrator: Sue Boersma
- Principal: Ian Charlton
- Grades: 9 to 12
- Enrollment: ~750
- Language: English
- Area: Woodstock
- Colours: Blue and Gold
- Team name: Knights
- Website: collegeavenue.tvdsb.ca/en/index.aspx

College Avenue Secondary School is one of three public high schools in Woodstock, Ontario under the Thames Valley District School Board and is named after the street on which it is located. It is built on the site of the former Woodstock College, which closed in 1926. It offers full courses for students in grade 9 through 12. The school has a visual arts program and a number of technology courses, most notably its Hospitality program CASS CHEF(College Avenue Secondary School Culinary Hospitality Enriches Futures). The technological programs include; baking, cooking, horticulture, auto mechanics, welding and woodshop. The school also has a football team, as well as basketball, ice hockey, rugby, swimming, track and volleyball teams called the CASS Knights. They offer a large variety of clubs, most notably the Band as well as Wired, The Robotics Club, the Rainbow Knights, and LGBTQIA2S+ advocacy group.

== Notable alumni ==
- Andrea Roth, actress

== See also ==
- Education in Ontario
- List of secondary schools in Ontario
