= London Central Secondary School =

Secondary school in Ontario, Canada

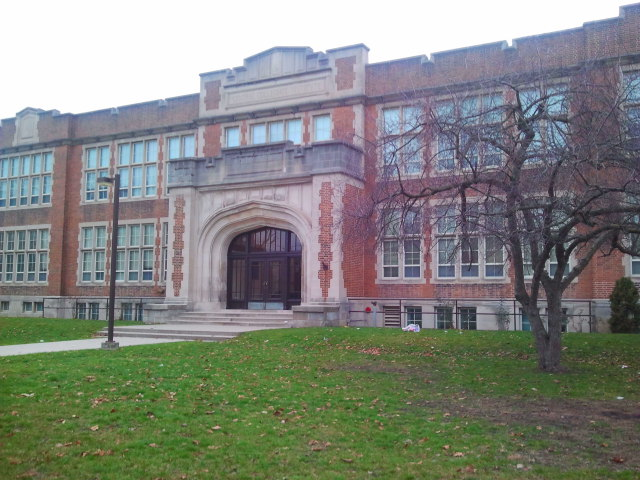

Location
- 509 Waterloo Street; London, Ontario, N6B 2P8; Canada; 42.98886°N 81.24467°W

Information
- School type: Secondary
- Motto: Sola Nobilitas Scientia (Only in knowledge is there nobility)
- Founded: 1877
- School board: Thames Valley District School Board
- Superintendent: Sheila Powell
- Principal: Margaret Sullivan
- Grades: 9–12
- Enrollment: 1011
- Language: English
- Colours: Purple and gold
- Mascot: Golden Ghost
- Team name: Central Golden Ghosts
- Website: central.tvdsb.ca

London Central Secondary School is a public secondary school located at the corner of Dufferin Avenue and Waterloo Street in downtown London, Ontario. It is a member of the Thames Valley District School Board. It has approximately 1000 students in full attendance, ranging from grades nine to twelve.

== History ==
Being the oldest school in the city, Central has a history that can be traced back to a Grammar School of 1826–1926 near the forks of the Thames River. When this Grammar School became too small, a Union School was erected. The Union School was renamed Central School in 1865; however, the school was razed in 1890 when other schools were able to accommodate Central students.

London Collegiate Institute was constructed on its present site in 1877; the school was destroyed by a fire in 1920.

In 1922, the new London Central Collegiate Institute was officially opened. It was enlarged in 1962 and again in 1968. Central celebrated its centennial in 1977. Construction of an addition including a new weight room, elevator and conference room was completed in August 1993. Further extensive renovations took place during 1995–1996 which fully modernized Central's building, made it mostly wheelchair accessible, and incorporated a school-wide computer network for students.

From 1979 until 1999, London Central was the host to the Module scolaire de langue française (MSLF) – the first public French first language high school in London, Ont. Before the 1998–1999 school year, the MSLF became École secondaire Gabriel-Dumont and it moved into a new Le Centre Desloges (CDL) for the start of the 1999–2000 school year. Until the move the students in the MSLF had been fully integrated in life at Central, participating as Golden Ghosts in music, drama and sports. Students from the MSLF were often elected to Central students’ council, including student council president.

Central's Reach for the Top team won nationally in two years, 2007 and 2009. The music program is nationally recognizable, with both wind, string, and jazz ensembles placing in the top three in provincial competitions. Additionally, the Senior Jazz Ensemble has earned Gold Standings at the National MusicFest on numerous occasions. The London Central Secondary school chess team was the highest performing in Ontario, winning every tournament they attended including the Ontario Provincials. London Central can also be noted for being the first secondary school in Ontario to run an official Paranormal Club.

== Programs ==
=== Music ===
About half of the student population is in the music program at Central. Opportunities for students include the Junior Band, Intermediate Band, Senior Band, Wind Ensemble, Junior Stage Band, Senior Jazz Band, Junior String Orchestra, Intermediate String Orchestra, Senior String Orchestra, Intermediate Symphony Orchestra, Senior Symphony Orchestra, Junior Chamber Orchestra, Senior Chamber Orchestra, Senior String Quartet, Chamber Choir, Concert Choir, Senior Brass Quartet, Intermediate Percussion Ensemble, and Alumni Band. The program has during the past five years won every single competition at the Kiwanis Music Festival at least once, placed in the top three in dozens of provincial competitions, and received Gold and silver medals at national festivals.

=== Athletics ===
London Central Secondary School has also had a rich athletic history, starting with football during the early years of the school. It was written in the London Free Press that during the city championship football game the Central players seemed to move through the defense like ghosts. This is where the term "Central Golden Ghosts" originated.

Since then there have been successes in basketball, soccer, football, and wrestling. In 1998, the Central senior boys' basketball team went undefeated, going on to win the city championship. London Central brought home the junior football AAA championship in 2004, 2006, 2010 and 2014. Central's wrestling team has had great success since it was founded in 2009. The Ghosts won their first team title in 2012 when the girls won the WOSSAA Championship. The girls team repeated as WOSSAA Champions again in 2018 and 2019 when Central also won the Overall Team Championship. Central won the TVRA Geris Division Girls Championship and Overall Championships in 2017, 2018 and 2019. Nita Rrafshi won the Bill Salter Award for the Most Outstanding Wrestler at TVRA in 2017 and Jonelle Clarke was named the Most Outstanding Wrestler in 2019. Central's track and field team placed first for the male team scores and second for the female team scores in the senior division at the track and field championship in 2018.

== Notable alumni ==
- Thalia Assuras, anchorwoman for CBS
- Karen Baldwin, Miss Universe, 1982 (attended Sir Adam Beck)
- Murray Barr, physician and medical researcher
- Nate Behar, CFL football player, Ottawa Redblacks
- The Essentials, a cappella group (two of five founding members, Joon Nah & Joe Oliva)
- Max Ferguson, CBC Radio personality (Rawhide)
- Jessie Fleming, soccer player, Canada's Women's National Team
- Victor Garber, actor
- Natalie Glebova, Miss Universe, 2005
- Jenny Jones, daytime talk show host; also attended Clarke Road Secondary School
- John Kapelos, actor
- Rebecca Liddiard, actress
- Edgar Sydney Little, Senator
- Luke Macfarlane, actor
- Sam Maggs, author
- Bree Mills, adult film director, owner of Pure Taboo.com
- David Peterson, the twentieth Premier of Ontario
- John Robarts, the seventeenth Premier of Ontario
- Shad, rapper, host of Netflix's Hip Hop Evolution
- David Suzuki, geneticist, environmental and civil rights activist
- Andrew Lawton, MP for Elgin—St. Thomas—London South; also attended Saunders Secondary School

== See also ==
- Education in Ontario
- List of secondary schools in Ontario
