= North Middlesex District High School =

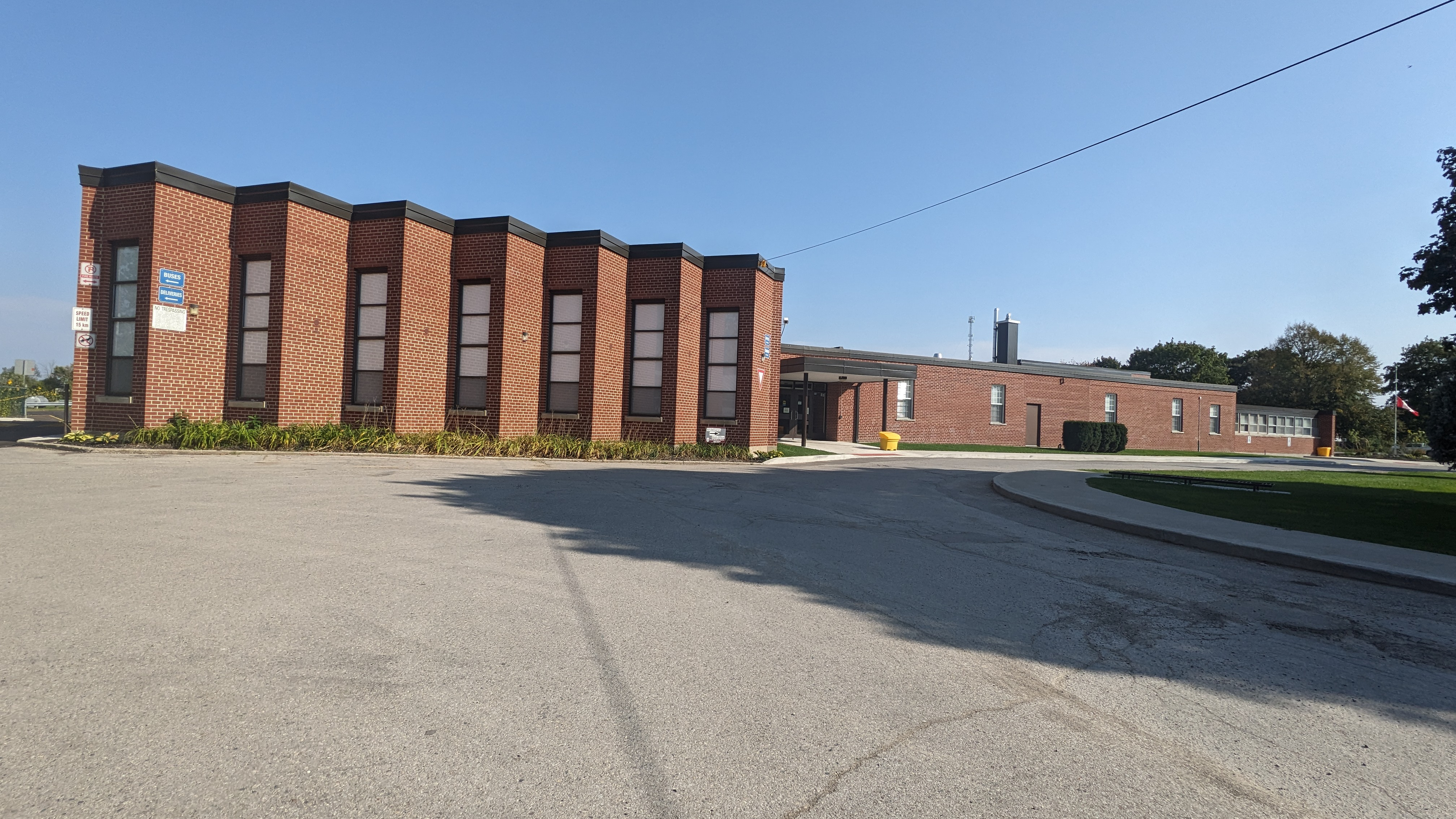

Location
- 100 Main Street; Parkhill, Ontario, N0M 2K0; Canada; 43.1541°N 81.6855°W

Information
- School type: Secondary
- Motto: Knowledge Conquers All
- School board: Thames Valley District School Board
- Superintendent: Karen Wilkinson
- Principal: A Smith
- Grades: 9 to 12
- Enrollment: 147 (November 2018)
- Language: English
- Area: North Middlesex
- Colours: Wine and White
- Mascot: Marauder
- Team name: NMDHS Marauder
- Website: www.tvdsb.ca/NorthMiddlesex.cfm

North Middlesex District High School is on Main Street, Parkhill, Ontario, Canada, at the corner of Elginfield Road and Parkhill Main Street (Formerly Highways 7 and 81), and serves the largely farming Municipality of North Middlesex. It offers a co-operative education program. It is the home of the "Marauders". It is the smallest high school in the Thames Valley District School Board.

== See also ==
- Education in Ontario
- List of secondary schools in Ontario
