= Sir Frederick Banting Secondary School =

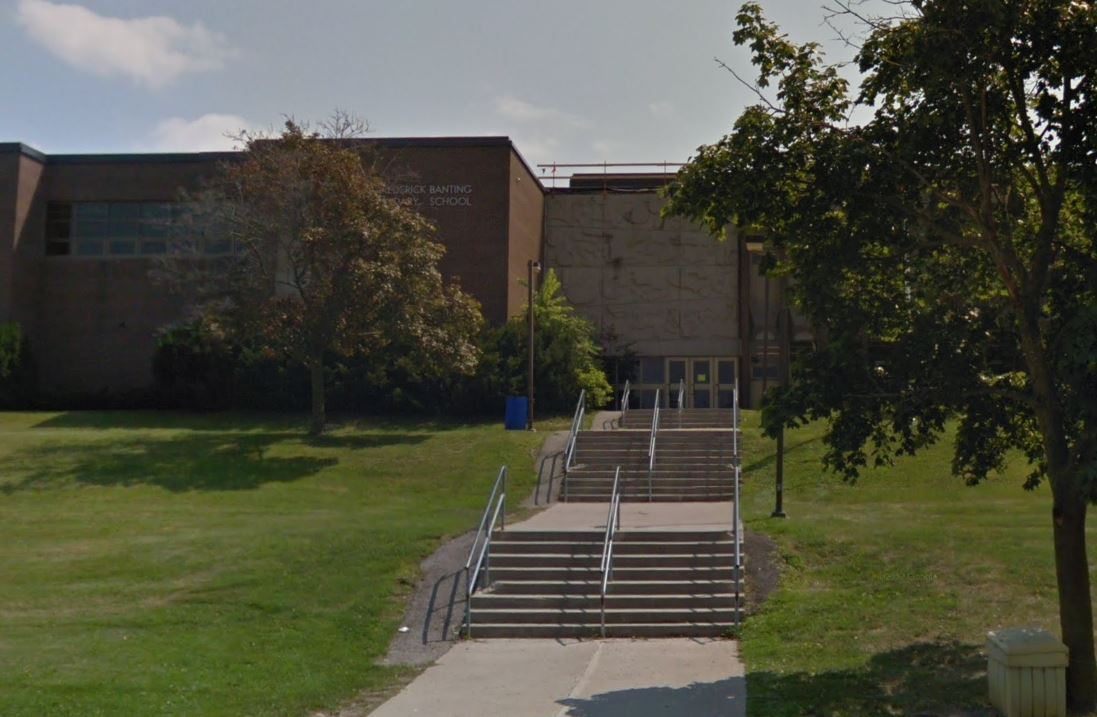
- Banting in the spring

Location
- 125 Sherwood Forest Square; London, Ontario, N6G 2C3; Canada; 43.0021°N 81.3054°W

Information
- Type: Public
- Established: September 1969
- Principal: Greg Howard
- Enrollment: 1900 (2024-2025)
- Colours: Maroon, Gold & Navy Blue
- Mascot: Freddy The Bronco
- Website: banting.tvdsb.ca/en/index.aspx

Sir Frederick Banting Secondary School is a high school located in London, Ontario, Canada. It is part of the Thames Valley District School Board. The school is named after Sir Frederick Banting, who won the Nobel Prize for the discovery of insulin in 1923. The school was officially opened in 1967 with Lady Banting, widow of Sir Frederick Banting, in attendance. The founding principal (1968–1970) was George A. Robbins. Banting is recognized for having a strong French Immersion program and a music program.

Currently 1,893 students from grade 9–12 are enrolled.

Irene Mathyssen, the former Member of Parliament for London-Fanshawe, taught English at the school until she was elected in the 2006 federal election.

Banting shares an almost exact floor plan with its sister school, Montcalm Secondary School.

The school participated in CBC's series The Greatest Canadian, in which Sir Frederick Banting was nominated.

== Athletics ==
Sir Frederick Banting Secondary School is the alma mater of three-time Summer Olympian discus-thrower Jason Tunks; heptathlete Jessica Zelinka; speed skater Christine Nesbitt, gold-medalist at the 2010 Winter Olympics in women's 1000 m and silver-medalist at the 2006 Winter Olympics in the women's team pursuit; Melanie McCann, 2012 and 2016 Olympic competitor in the modern pentathlon; and Maggie MacNeil, gold medalist swimmer at the 2020 Summer Olympics. CFLers Jude St. John, a Grey Cup-winning player with Toronto Argonauts and Hamilton Tiger Cat’s; Sean McKeon, OL for the Calgary Stampeders; Matt McKnight, DB for the Calgary Stampeders, and most recently 2019 Grey Cup winning Nick Hallett, DB with the Winnipeg Blue Bombers also attended Sir Frederick Banting Secondary School. NHL players Mike Van Ryn, Steve Rucchin, and Steve Stoyanovich were students at Banting SS. Alan Coulter played 13 years on the Canadian National Men's Volleyball Team and was captain part of those years. UFC MMA star Sam “Hands of Stone” Stout attended Banting before heading to the octagon for his successful fighting career.

== Community services ==
Banting has hosted events for United Way programs, the annual S.C.R.O.O.G.E. campaign, D.A.R.E. (Delegates Attaining Raw Experience), a two-day retreat at a camp, Relay for life, and Wildcard, an event that started in 1998 which allows grade eight students to see what life at Banting is like with two full days of events and a sleepover. The school also has a neighbouring adult ESL centre.

== Notable alumni ==
- Warren Christie, Actor
- Maggie Mac Neil, Olympic gold medalist, 2020 Summer Olympics
- Loghan Paylor, Author

== See also ==
- Education in Ontario
- List of high schools in Ontario
