= St. Thomas Aquinas Catholic Secondary School (London, Ontario) =

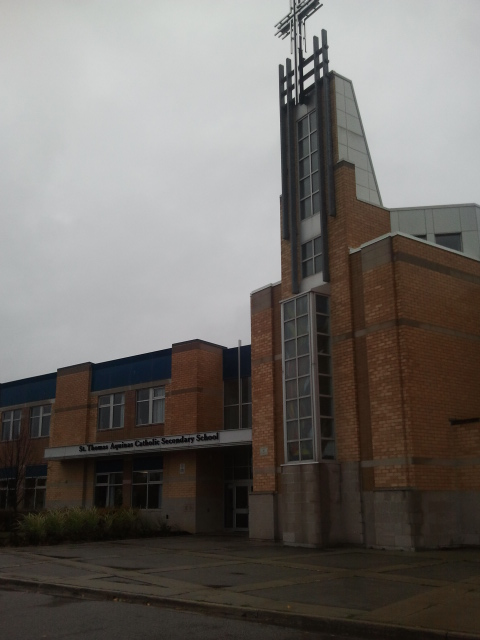

Location
- 1360 Oxford Street West; London, Ontario, N6H 1W2; Canada; 84.098679°N 116.680153°W

Information
- School type: Roman Catholic
- Religious affiliation: Catholic
- Founded: 1990 (current location 1994)
- School board: London District Catholic School Board
- School number: 4495
- Principal: Cheryl Sywyk
- Grades: 9–12 (13)
- Enrollment: 1160 (September 2022)
- Language: English
- Area: West London (Oakridge)
- Colours: Red, black and white
- Mascot: "Gideon" the Dragon
- Team name: Flames
- Website: sta.ldcsb.ca

St. Thomas Aquinas Catholic Secondary School (STA) is a Catholic secondary school in London, Ontario, located in the neighbourhood of Oakridge in the west end of the city. It currently serves students in the London District Catholic School Board in the London Areas of Byron, Oakridge, Westmount, Lambeth, as well as some areas outside of the city limits such as Delaware, Komoka and even as far as Mount Brydges.

== History ==
St. Thomas Aquinas was first established at the site of the former St. Joseph Catholic school on Charles Street in 1990. Construction began on the school's permanent site in 1993 on 8 hectares in the northwest sector of London, Ontario, adjacent to the Byron neighbourhood. The current building, opened in 1994 and 152,314 square feet in size, was highly technologically advanced for its time with internet access throughout the school, as well as cable television and VCRs in virtually every classroom.

The school was built with the expectation that it would house 945 students. Its peak enrollment hit approximately 1,800 students in the late 1990s, and has since stabilized to around 1100 students.

STA was built with a "cafetorium", a space which could be used as either a cafeteria or auditorium with portable seating stored under the stage. This cafetorium has been the site of many assemblies, school shows, and other various school events and performances. It was also used as a temporary location for weekend Masses for St. George's Parish during church reconstruction in 1998–99.

The school has a double gym, fitness room, library, computer labs, performance stage and an indoor track.

== Academics ==
STA has traditionally been successful academically since its opening, and is currently rated 163rd of the province's 746 high schools. According to a London Free Press report, 21% of graduating students entered college, 63% entered university, and 16% entered the workforce.

== Arts ==
The Arts Department has a variety of programs ranging from Instrumental Music, Vocal, Visual Arts, Dance, Dramatic Arts to Technical Theatre.

== Sports ==
STA generally performs well in most of its athletic endeavours. Notable championships include OFSAA AAAA Girls Hockey champions (three times: 200?, 2006, 2007), OFSAA AAAA Boys Hockey champions (1999, 2020), and Western Bowl football champions (in 2006). They have won numerous local, regional, and provincial championships in various other sports, including badminton, basketball, cross-country, curling, golf, soccer, swimming, tennis, track & field, volleyball, rowing, baseball, and wrestling.

== Noted Alumni ==
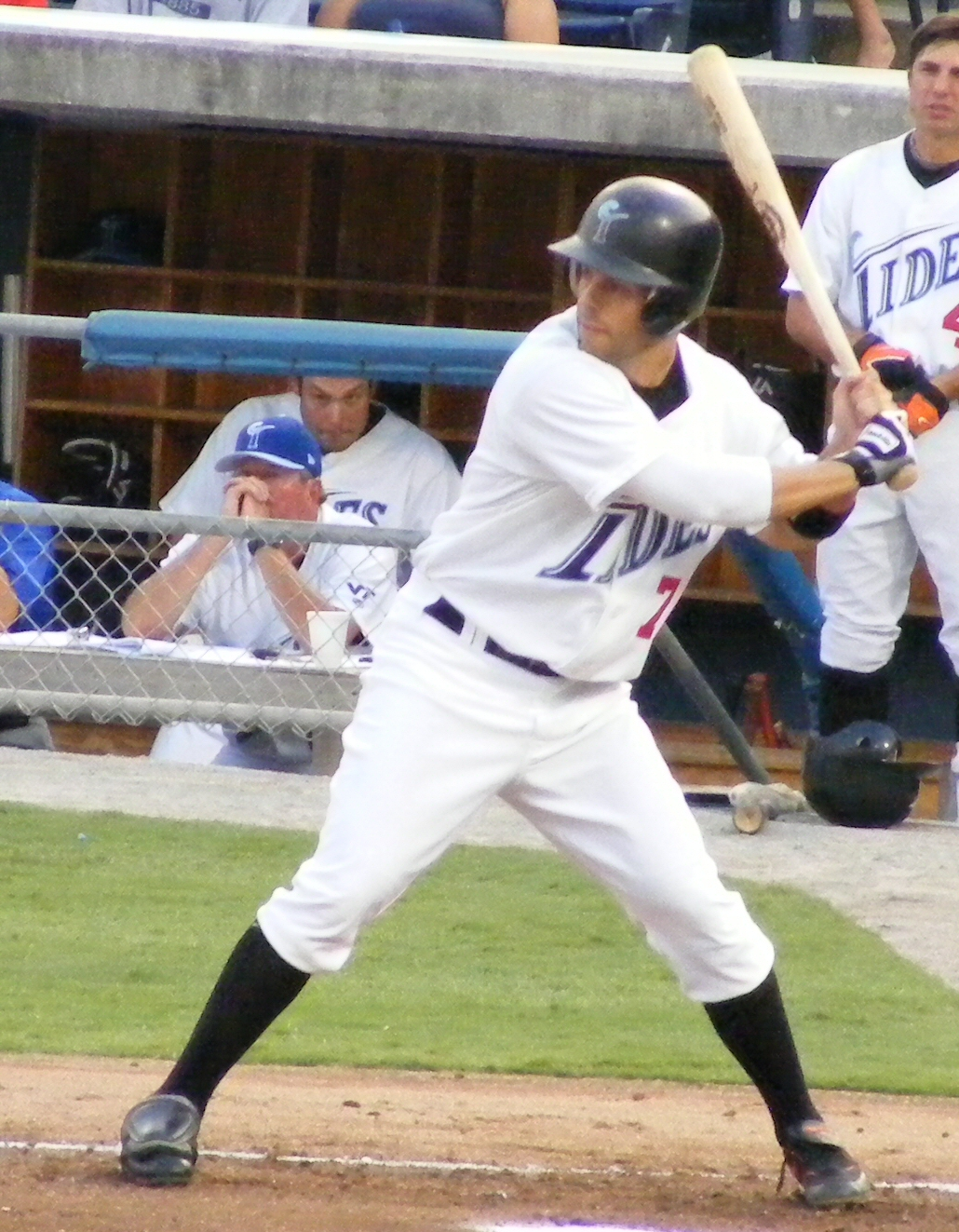
Adam Stern

- Joe Bartoch – Olympic swimmer
- Sam Gagner – NHL hockey player
- Chris Haslam – professional skateboarder
- Lanni Marchant – Canadian marathon record holder
- Bryan Lee O'Malley – Cartoonist famous for Scott Pilgrim series
- Isaac Ratcliffe - NHL hockey player
- Adam Stern – major league baseball player
- Nick Suzuki - NHL hockey player
- Shelina Zadorsky – Canadian Women's National Soccer Team player, earned a bronze medal at the 2016 Olympics in Brazil

== See also ==
- Education in Ontario
- List of secondary schools in Ontario
