= Joshua Workman =

Canadian political consultant

Joshua Workman is a Canadian political consultant. He had prior ties to the US Republican Party and was elected, at age 19, to attend the 2000 Republican National Convention in Philadelphia, Pennsylvania. There he was credited as being one of the youngest delegates in US history.

== Early years ==
Joshua Workman was born in Guelph, Ontario in 1980.

Workman grew up in Byron, Ontario, and later attended Oakridge Secondary School in London, Ontario. Workman completed his five-year Ontario Secondary School Diploma in just over 3 years and was able to complete secondary school at the age of 17.

In 1997, at age 17 he accepted both athletic and academic scholarships to attend Lees-McRae College in Banner Elk, North Carolina.

== Political beginnings ==
In 1997, upon enrolling at Lees-McRae College, Workman became active in the campus College Republican Chapter and later would be elected to the Executive of the North Carolina Federation of College Republicans.

Workman was also involved in Student Government and was elected as Sophomore Class President in 1998–99 and Senior Class President in 2000–2001 while attending Lees-McRae College.

In 1998, Workman worked as a Youth Director for U.S. Senator Lauch Faircloth's re-election campaign.

== The 2000 Republican National Convention ==
During the convention, Workman was the subject of an MTV political reality television show called 'Choose or Loose' which was aired several times throughout the United States.

In an interview with journalist Barry Yeoman during the convention, Workman made his views on a variety of issues known stating, "It started with economics, I started thinking about the welfare system, and how people don't act responsibly because they've got it to fall back on. There's such a great economy in our world today that people shouldn't have this crutch that they rely on just to be lazy."

In a different interview, Workman spoke in favour of tax relief stating, "The first thing Bush should do is give us some of our money back. They've got a huge surplus of money that is piling up and they should give some of it back."

Workman also discussed his love for Canada stating, "I love Canada. I've got a maple-leaf tattoo. I like the fact that it's safe there, that you don't have to think about getting mugged.".

On Canada's gun-control policy Workman states, "Canada's pretty liberal, no handguns allowed. The only time you have a gun is if you're a hunter, or if you're a cop. I don't think that's a good policy. If the wrong person was elected, the wrong party came to power, not having arms would be a major benefit for a dictatorship or someone of poor moral character to take over. If only the police and the army have guns, the government's going to do what they want. If people have guns, then we have a means to fight.".

Finally, on the subject of abortion, Workman stated that Bush could harm the electoral future of the GOP if he were to select a running mate who supports abortion rights. It would be "insulting to the base" of the Republican Party, Workman said.

Summarizing his convention experience, in the "Quote of the Day", Workman stated, "If we nominate George W. Bush and he goes on to become one of the great presidents, then I can tell my kids I was there. I was part of the nominating process."

== 2002 ==
In 2002, Workman was Political Director for US Congressman Cass Ballenger and led his successful re-election efforts during the 2002 campaign.

== 2003 ==
On June 30, 2003, Workman pleaded guilty to minor charges of providing false information to a federal agency. When asked about the charges, Sue Ellen Pierce, spokeswoman for the U.S. Attorney Office in the western district of North Carolina, said Workman received a one-year sentence of unsupervised probation.

== 2004 ==
In 2004, he was the campaign manager of Mike Menear's bid for federal office in London West. During Menear's campaign, Workman's policy views again became public when he stated that, "Getting other young Canadians involved in politics -- even if it's just casting a ballot on election day -- is another priority. Less than one-quarter of voters under 25 participated in the last federal election. If all the Western students got together and voted (they) would have to be listened to. Any political involvement is a good thing for a young person."

== 2005 ==
In 2005, a feature article titled "Backroom Holds A Special Place for Political Worker", Workman stated that he has no intent and could not see himself running for elected office.

== 2006 ==
In 2006, Workman was the successful Co-Chairman for Bev Shipley's 2006 federal campaign. Workman was quoted by CBC discussing Shipley's Voter Turnout Strategy in the final days of the campaign, saying, "We're going to certainly be out knocking on doors and making calls this weekend. If all goes well, on Monday we'll be having a celebration"

In June 2006, Workman traveled to Nova Scotia where he worked on PC Premier Rodney MacDonald's successful election campaign.

In September 2006, Workman was quoted discussing a possible byelection in London North Centre due to the resignation of MP Joe Fontana from Federal politics. Workman stated, "the pending vacancy creates a unique opportunity. The opportunity to pick up a seat that has been a firmly entrenched Liberal hold is very exciting. I would expect several strong candidates to emerge. With a vacancy like this, it's almost certain that potential candidates from outside the area are at least considering their options".

In November 2006, Workman was listed as a donor to London City Councillor Nancy Branscombe's campaign.

== 2007 ==
In September 2007, Workman was quoted discussing the role of technology in modern political campaigns. Workman stated, "It used to be when one candidate came in and the other went out, data was lost sometimes. If you can carry on and build from where you left off you're going to be saving time and resources. The name of the game these days with spending limits is maximizing your resources. If you can start off at Step 2 instead of Step 1, it means less time, less money and less energy".

In the same article, he stated, "You can't substitute the handshake from the candidate and the face-to-face contact, no matter what you do".

== 2008 ==
In October 2008, Workman served as Campaign Manager for Lambton-Kent-Middlesex MP Bev Shipley's re-election campaign. The campaign saw Shipley's margin of victory increase by over 11% versus his 2006 campaign (+4369 votes).

On election night, Workman was quoted by the London Free Press saying voters in the riding were pleased with the Conservative leadership. "Voters were comfortable with Bev Shipley. Voters in Lambton-Kent-Middlesex are much more comfortable with the Conservative party".

== 2010 ==
In a Sun Media article, Workman was quoted discussing the upcoming 2010 London municipal election. Workman stated that incumbent Mayor Anne Marie DiCicco-Best, (is) "going to be very hard to beat. But like everyone, Anne Marie has weaknesses," one weakness of the three-term mayor, he said, "is the perception that the city has not progressed due to lack of big-picture leadership".

In another Sun Media article, Workman discussed former Cabinet Minister Joe Fontana's entry into the London municipal campaign saying, for Fontana to beat incumbent Mayor Anne Marie DiCicco-Best it would take, "a perfect storm". "It's not impossible but it's a long shot. He has to get out and be seen and share his vision with the people. They want a fresh vision, not a tried-and-true approach. To overcome 22,000 votes, he's going to have to shake things up."

== Currently ==
Workman is currently involved in several of London's charitable and not-for-profit organizations. He currently volunteers with the Canadian Diabetes Association and the Canadian Red Cross. Workman is the inaugural President & CEO of WorkSafe Ontario.

Workman is a Past-President of the Canadian Club of London.
