= Glencoe District High School =

Glencoe District High School (GDHS)

Location
- 3581 Concession St; Glencoe, Ontario, N0L 1M0; Canada; 42.74147252°N 81.71191543°W

Information
- School type: Secondary
- Founded: 1952
- School board: Thames Valley District School Board
- Principal: Mr. B. Milne
- Grades: 9–12
- Enrollment: 200
- Language: English
- Colours: Green and White and Gold
- Team name: Gaels
- Website: glencoe.tvdsb.ca/en/index.aspx

Glencoe District High School is a Thames Valley District School Board Secondary School located in the town of Glencoe, Ontario, in the county of Middlesex, in Ontario, Canada. The school is 40 minutes west of London.

== Partnerships ==
Glencoe District High School has a Dual Credit Program affiliated with Fanshawe College and Lambton College.

== See also ==
- Education in Ontario
- List of secondary schools in Ontario
- Thames Valley District School Board
