= Madame Curie (disambiguation) =

Madame Curie was a Polish physicist and chemist.

Madame Curie may also refer to:

- Madame Curie (film), a 1943 biographical film made by MGM
- Madame Curie (opera), an opera by Elzbieta Sikora first performed 2011 at Unesco Paris.
- Rue Madame Curie, a street in Beirut, Lebanon

== See also ==
- Marie Curie (disambiguation)
