= Académie de la Moraine =

Location
- 13200 Yonge St; Richmond Hill, Ontario, L4E 2T2; Canada; 43°56′59″N 79°27′23″W

Information
- School type: Elementary school
- Motto: Un pas à la fois (One step at a time)
- Founded: September 2000
- School board: Conseil scolaire Viamonde
- School number: 165468
- Principal: Céline Dahary
- Grades: K–6
- Enrolment: 100 (October 30, 2005)
- Language: French
- Website: web.archive.org/web/20060425092310/http://lamoraine.csdcso.on.ca:80/
- Last updated: April 12, 2006

Académie de la Moraine is a French-language elementary school located in Richmond Hill, Ontario, Canada. It serves the francophone population of the Greater Toronto Area. Its former location was 13200 Yonge Street in Richmond Hill. However, after George Street Public School closed, Moraine took up its space. In 2019, after remodelling, reconstruction, and upgrading the school facilities, the school returned to its previous address at 13200 Yonge Street.

Académie de la Moraine is a feeder school to École Secondaire Norval-Morrisseau, a French high school of the same school board which serves Grades 7–12.

== See also ==
- Conseil scolaire Viamonde
