= Sir Wilfrid Laurier Secondary School (London, Ontario) =

Sir Wilfrid Laurier Secondary School FI
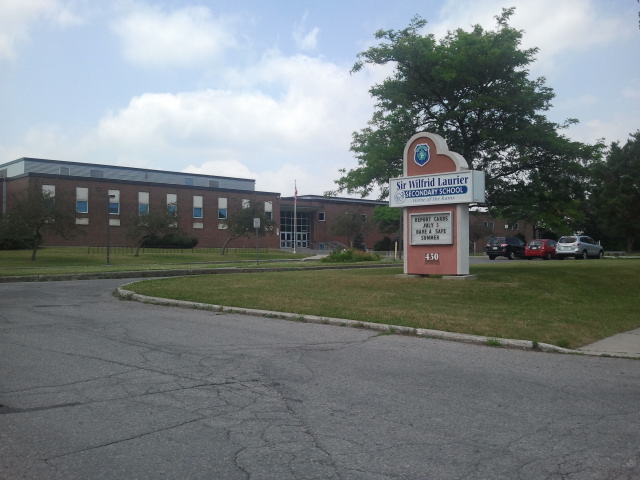

Location
- 450 Millbank Drive; London, Ontario, N6C 4W7; Canada; 42°56′49″N 81°12′20″W

Information
- School type: Public, High school
- Established: 1966–1967
- School board: Thames Valley District School Board
- School number: 942162
- Principal: S. Hambides
- Enrollment: 1085 (October 2018)
- Language: English, French
- Campus: Urban
- Colours: Kelly Green and Navy Blue
- Mascot: Wilf the Ram
- Website: Official Website

Sir Wilfrid Laurier Secondary School or Laurier is a high school located at 450 Millbank Drive in the south east end of London, Ontario, Canada. The school is in the Thames Valley District School Board. The school has 1,145 students and 80 teachers and is named after Canadian Prime Minister Sir Wilfrid Laurier. The school colours are green and blue. It is one of two French immersion high schools in the area.

== Athletics and clubs ==
Sir Wilfrid Laurier S.S has plenty of athletic opportunities available for its students. Popular sports include Canadian football and cross country in the fall, volleyball and basketball in the winter, and track and field in the spring. Many other individual or small team sports are offered as well.

== See also ==
- Education in Ontario
- List of secondary schools in Ontario
