= Clarke Road Secondary School =

Location
- 300 Clarke Road; London, Ontario, N5W 5N4; Canada; 42.999625°N 81.172013°W

Information
- School type: Secondary
- Motto: From Clarke Road To The Road Ahead
- Founded: 1956
- School board: Thames Valley District School Board
- Superintendent: Christine Giannacopoulos
- Principal: Tom Maloney
- Grades: 9 to 12
- Enrollment: approximately 1080 (Sept. 2015)
- Language: English
- Area: East London
- Colours: Orange and Black
- Mascot: Trojan Warrior (Andrew myers)
- Team name: Clarke Road Trojans
- Website: clarkeroad.tvdsb.ca

Clarke Road Secondary School is located at 300 Clarke Road in London, Ontario. It is a part of the Thames Valley District School Board. The school was founded in 1956 and a major 14 million dollar renovation was completed in 1997. The school mascot is the Trojan Warrior.

Clarke Road's recent renovation has given the school state-of-the-art gymnasia, science, technology, and computer facilities. The school presently has over 400 computers available for student use in all programs in the school. The renovations have also provided a major developmental centre in the school, as well as integrated programs for over 50 students.

== Post-secondary statistics ==
As of June 2008:

- 45% of students apply to college
- 40% of students enter the workforce
- 15% of students apply to university

== See also ==
- Education in Ontario
- List of secondary schools in Ontario
