= Central Elgin Collegiate Institute =

Location
- 201 Chestnut Street; St. Thomas, Ontario, N5R 2B5; Canada; 42.76978°N 81.17371°W

Information
- School type: Secondary School
- Motto: Carpe Diem (Seize the Day)
- Founded: 1954
- School board: Thames Valley District School Board
- Superintendent: Paul Sydor
- School number: 2060
- Principal: Kerry Everitt
- Grades: 9–12
- Enrollment: 690 (2024/2025)
- Language: English, French,
- Colours: Gold and black
- Mascot: Titan Man and Titan Woman
- Team name: CECI Titans
- Website: www.tvdsb.ca/CentralElgin.cfm

Central Elgin Collegiate Institute is the smallest of two public secondary schools in St. Thomas, Ontario, Canada.

At one time the school was part of the International Baccalaureate Organization; however, that status is no longer recognized. Central's current principal is Kerry Everitt.

== Recent athletic accomplishments ==
- 2010 Varsity Boys Hockey WOSSAA Bronze Medalists
- 2010 Varsity Girls Soccer WOSSAA Champions
- 2010 Girls Curling Team OFSAA Silver Medalists
- 4 CECI Wrestlers medaled at OFSAA 2011
- 2012 baseball team second in TVRAA and third in WOSSAA
- 2012 OFSAA Gold Medalist – Long Jump
- 2012 Varsity Boys Football TVRAA South East Champions – Undefeated Season
- 2015 Math Team Champions

== Notable alumni ==
- Rachel McAdams (b. 1978), film actress
- Joe Thornton (b. 1979), professional ice hockey player for San Jose Sharks, Boston Bruins, and the Canadian national team

== See also ==
- Education in Ontario
- List of secondary schools in Ontario
