= Montcalm Secondary School =

Location
- 1350 Highbury Avenue; London, Ontario, N5Y 1B5; Canada; 43.0246°N 81.21664°W

Information
- School type: Secondary
- Motto: Freedom with Responsibility
- Founded: 1969; 57 years ago (current facility)
- School board: Thames Valley District School Board
- Principal: J. Brown
- Grades: 9–12
- Language: English
- Colours: Blue and Gold
- Fight song: We Are The Montcalm Cougars
- Mascot: Cougars
- Website: montcalm.tvdsb.ca/en/index.aspx

Montcalm Secondary School is a comprehensive "Technology Emphasis" secondary school located in northeast London, Ontario, Canada. The school provides a range of programs for all students. Student population is roughly 800.

== History ==
Montcalm was distinguished from A.B. Lucas starting in the autumn of 1968, though located exclusively in some of the portable classrooms on the Lucas school property. The school moved into its present building in September 1969. Renovations late in the 1990s-early 2000s updated the range of technical subjects; lockers were relocated along corridor walls and the former locker bays were converted into additional class and specialty function space.

== Education ==
Montcalm offers a variety of courses for students at various levels. Academic courses are available in grade nine and ten. Applied courses are only available in grade ten. Locally developed courses are offered in grade 11 and 12. Montcalm also offers open courses. Thames Valley's aviation school runs out of Montcalm although it is available to all Thames Valley students.

== Facilities ==
Cafeteria, auditorium and no portables. There is a dance studio. Every student has their own locker.

== Annual events ==
- Music Nights
- S.C.R.O.O.G.E Canned Food Drive – Annual food drive where students go around to their community to collect cans for the London Food Bank. They have reached the highest number of cans per student for several years in a row. After winning the gold medal for a number of consecutive years, a new award was made for them, the platinum award. (SCROOGE – Students' Christmas Rush for Oodles and Oodles of Goodies, Etc.)
- United Way Stairclimb
- Career fair
- Cancer Campaign – A week-long charity event to help raise money to send kids to Camp Trillium, a cancer camp for kids. Montcalm is the only high school within the district that raises money for Camp Trillium.
- Fusion Fashion Show – A multi-cultural display of fashion and musical talents put on by the Multi-Cultural Club.

== Clubs/Teams ==
- Football
- Boys Soccer (2019 AA City Champions)
- Girls Soccer
- Wrestling
- Track and Field
- Varsity Hockey
- Basketball
- Volleyball
- Badminton (Junior Team - 2019 AA City Champions)
- Choir
- Band
- Jazz Band
- Audio/Visual Club
- Multicultural Club
- Social Justice Club
- Student Council
- Jack.Org
- Improv Club
- Board Game Club
- Multicultural Club

== Athletic spaces ==
- Two gyms
- Weight room
- Tennis courts
- Football field
- Soccer field
- Baseball diamond
- Track

== Notable alumni ==
- David McLellan, Canadian swimmer, 1992 Barcelona Olympics 1500m freestyle
- Casey Patton, Canadian boxer, 5 time Canadian champion, 1994 Commonwealth Games gold medalist, 1996 Atlanta Olympics, London Sports Hall of Fame inductee
- Pat Riggin, former London Knight and NHL goalie
- Damian Warner, Canadian decathlete, 2020 Tokyo Olympic gold medalist

== See also ==
- Education in Ontario
- List of secondary schools in Ontario
