= Arthur Voaden Secondary School =

Location
- 41 Flora Street; St. Thomas, Ontario, N5P 2X5; Canada; 42°46′49″N 81°11′19″W

Information
- School type: Public, high school
- Motto: We Seek, We Strive, We Conquer
- Founded: 1926
- Status: Closed
- Closed: 2026
- School board: Thames Valley District School Board
- School district: South
- School number: 892670
- Grades: 9–12
- Language: English
- Team name: Vikings
- Website: www.tvdsb.ca/ArthurVoaden.cfm

Arthur Voaden Secondary School (often abbreviated as AVSS) was a high school in St. Thomas, Ontario, Canada. Voaden is part of the Thames Valley District School Board.

== History ==
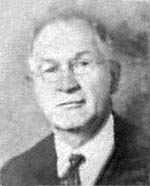
The founder, Dr. Arthur Voaden

Originally named simply Arthur Voaden Vocational School, it was one of the first vocational schools in Ontario. It was constructed in a time when secondary school was considered a privilege, and was meant for those entering university or white-collar jobs. The school is named after Arthur Voaden, M. D., a native of nearby Talbotville. After a year of construction, the doors were opened in September 1926. Voaden was the principal of the school from its opening until he died in 1931.

AVSS was a composite school that offered all graduation pathways including university, college, apprenticeships, and the workplace. It was also Elgin County's 'emphasis technology' school, offering programming in communications technology, health care, hospitality and tourism, construction/woodworking, hairstyling and aesthetics, and manufacturing. It also offers several Specialist High School Majors (SHSM). Arthur Voaden was also highly regarded for its arts programs, including the exceptional visual art department.

On April 28, 2026, it was announced that Arthur Voaden Secondary School would close at the end of the 2025-2026 school year and be replaced by a new school building. The school ceased operations on June 27, 2026, after nearly 100 years in operation.

== Notable alumni ==
- Dan Cloutier – attended Voaden for the 1991–1992 school year while playing for the Jr B St. Thomas Stars as a 15-year-old. He was drafted by the Sault Ste. Marie Greyhounds of the OHL in 1992, and then by the New York Rangers of the NHL 26th overall in 1994, and has played for the New York Rangers, Tampa Bay Lightning, Vancouver Canucks, and Los Angeles Kings.
- Stephen Ouimette – attended Voaden from 1968 to 1972
- Terry Wilson (hate crime investigator)

== See also ==
- Education in Ontario
- List of secondary schools in Ontario
