= École secondaire Franco-Jeunesse =

Location
- 2-901 The Rapids Pkwy; Sarnia, Ontario, N7S 6K2; Canada
- 42.9971°N 82.3748°W

Information
- School type: High school
- School board: CSDCSO
- School number: 909858
- Principal: Serge Akpagnonite
- Grades: 7–12
- Enrollment: 100 (2021)
- Language: French
- Website: francojeunesse.csdcso.on.ca

École secondaire Franco-Jeunesse is a French high school in Sarnia, Ontario, Canada and is administered by the Conseil scolaire Viamonde.

The school, originally Module Française de Northern, was created with the implementation of the Mike Harris government's Fewer School Boards Act in 1997 which created 12 French-language school boards. Until 2013, Franco-Jeunesse continued to exist within the walls of Northern Collegiate. In 2013, Franco-Jeunesse moved to a new site, where it shares a building with École secondaire catholique St-François Xavier, of the Conseil scolaire catholique Providence, and the Centre communautaire francophone de Sarnia.

As of 2013, Franco-Jeunesse has 30 students.

== See also ==
- Education in Ontario
- List of secondary schools in Ontario
