= Medway High School (Arva, Ontario) =

Location
- 14405 Medway Road; Arva, Ontario, N0M 1C0; Canada

Information
- School type: Public, High school
- Founded: 1949
- School board: Thames Valley District School Board
- Superintendent: Paul Sydor
- Principal: Chris Smith
- Grades: 9–12
- Enrollment: 1600 (Oct. 2023)
- Language: English
- Colours: Scarlet & White
- Team name: Cowboys
- Website: medway.tvdsb.ca/en/index.aspx

Medway High School is a high school in Arva in Middlesex County, Ontario, Canada, approximately one kilometre north of London, Ontario, Canada city limits.

== History ==
Medway was built in 1949. Its original name was East Middlesex High School, but it was known locally as the Arva School. The name was changed to Medway to reflect the Medway Creek which winds through the area.

Medway was part of the Middlesex County Board of Education. Today it is part of the Thames Valley District School Board, which is Ontario's third largest board.

== Notable alumni ==
- Jonny Gray – actor
- Garth Hudson – Rock and Roll Hall of Fame inductee for the Canadian-American rock group The Band
- Lindsay Mathyssen – member of Parliament
- Scott Moir – figure skater, three-time World champion and three-time Olympic gold medalist in ice dancing
- Jacob Ruby – CFL football player, Edmonton Eskimos
- Mike Tompkins – YouTube personality
- Kimberly Tuck – curler

== See also ==
- Education in Ontario
- List of secondary schools in Ontario
