= Prosecution of gender-targeted crimes =

Prosecution of gender-targeted crimes is the legal proceedings to prosecute crimes such as rape and domestic violence. The earliest documented prosecution of gender-based/targeted crimes is from 1474 when Sir Peter von Hagenbach was convicted for rapes committed by his troops. However, the trial was only successful in indicting Sir von Hagenbach with the charge of rape because the war in which the rapes occurred was "undeclared" and thus the rapes were considered illegal only because of this. Gender-targeted crimes continued to be prosecuted, but it was not until after World War II when an international criminal tribunal – the International Military Tribunal for the Far East (Tokyo Tribunal) – were officers charged for being responsible of the gender-targeted crimes (particularly rape) and other crimes against humanity. Despite the various rape charges, the Charter of the Tokyo Tribunal did not make references to rape, and rape was considered as subordinate to other war crimes. This is also the situation for other tribunals that followed, but with the establishments of the International Criminal Tribunal for the former Yugoslavia (ICTY) and the International Criminal Tribunal for Rwanda (ICTR), there was more attention to the prosecution of gender-targeted crimes with each of the statutes explicitly referring to rape and other forms of gender-targeted violence.

== Types of gender-targeted crimes ==
=== Domestic violence ===
Percentage of physically abused women who never told family or officials about their abuse (2002)
Country	Percentage
Australia	18%
Canada	22%
Chile	30%
Cambodia	34%
Nicaragua	37%
UK	38%
Egypt	47%
Bangladesh	68%

Domestic violence covers a wide range of gender-targeted crimes such as rape and honor killings. As many women, who make up a majority of the victims(this statement is also variable, there are several researches, such as those on symmetrical domestic violence, which highlight a slightly greater percentage of women who carry out both physically and especially psychologically, violence against male partners), deny they are facing domestic violence, there are not enough reliable statistics on domestic violence. Due to the lack of information, violence against women is often dismissed as a "private" matter and no legal action is done(also this method of thinking, values for men too).

Despite the reforms that will be mentioned in the "Rape" section below, there is still a continuous debate over how the trials of the crimes should be conducted and over the effectiveness of the prosecution. The Violence Against Women Act, which was passed in 1994, paved the way in providing services and resources for women facing abuse and other forms of violence. However, there are limits on gender-targeted crimes reaching the Supreme Court and many are given to the state governments to oversee.

A study in the UK conducted from 2011 to 2012 found that false claims of rape and domestic violence are uncommon. This notion of frequent false accusations came about after the police and investigators began to follow an "over-cautious approach" when addressing reports of domestic violence. However, the study showed there were only a few false allegations during seventeen months over 2011–2012. The study revealed that during the seventeen months, there were 5,651 prosecutions for rape and 111,891 for domestic violence in England and Wales, and in the same timespan, there were thirty-five prosecutions for making false allegations of rape, six prosecutions for false allegations of domestic violence, and three for false allegations of both crimes. Following the study and the eleven percent increase of reported cases of domestic violence in the last three months of 2012, there have been enhancements in the handling of the reported crimes with random checks of cases to ensure the correct handling of the prosecution of the cases.

==== Rape ====
Before there were reforms in rape laws and special units to prosecute rape crimes, rape was a difficult case to prosecute as a crime; this is due to issue of consent, the need to provide sufficient evidence to charge the accused, and sometime biased cultural depictions of sexuality and gender. The prosecution largely relies on organizations, advocacy groups, or social movements such as the anti-rape movement in order to be effective. The difficulties can also bring negative consequences upon the victims. For example in the United States, a study in the 1980s found that the rape victims who went through the prosecution system had a slower recovery process than those who were not prosecuted.

In the United States, the late 1980s saw a nationwide movement of women's groups lobbying for reforms in rape laws. Their main goal was to prosecute rape in the similar manner that other crimes are prosecuted by focusing not on the victim's reputation or behavior but on the unlawful acts perpetrated by the offender. The movement also urged to have new laws improve the treatment of rape victims, and it hoped to have an increase in the number of reports of rape. The movement eventually led to rape law reforms for all fifty states. States varied in their reforms, but the common changes that resulted from the reforms were:

- 1) Changes in the definition of rape: include a more diverse range of sexual assaults such as identifying men as potential victims, women as potential perpetrators, and recognizing sexual assaults by a spouse
- 2) Elimination of the resistance requirement: Reformers argued that resistance could lead to more injuries and that the law should focus on the actions of the offender rather than those of the victim
- 3) Elimination of the corroboration requirement: Before the reform, rape was the only crime, which required corroborated testimony of the victim
- 4) Enactment of a rape shield law: The sexual history or incidents prior to the assault of the victim can no longer be used against the victim since it was argued that this information provides little, if any, evidence for the trial

In India after the 2012 Delhi gang rape case amendments were made to the laws concerning rape with more specific protocols towards the trial proceedings. The new law, Criminal Law (Amendment) Bill, 2013, also defines new crimes such as stalking and voyeurism, expands the definition of rape, and brings higher sentences for punishment of the offenders (such as the death penalty for repeated offenders and for cases resulting in the victim's death). The law was passed by India's Parliament in March 2013, and with the passing of this law, it is also a crime for the police to refuse to open cases for sexual attack allegations.

===== Marital rape =====
Percentage of women who say they have been subjected to sexual assault or attempted sexual assault by an intimate male partner (late 1990s)
Country	Percentage
Switzerland	12%
Germany	15%
USA	15%
Canada	15%
Nicaragua	22%
UK	23%
Zimbabwe	25%
India	28%

Marital rape is a form of sexual abuse and domestic violence. It is today increasingly criminalized around the world, but not all countries recognize it as a crime. Several countries in Eastern Europe and Scandinavia made spousal rape illegal before 1970, but other countries in Western Europe and the English-speaking Western world outlawed it much later, mostly in the 1980s and 1990s. In many countries of the world marital rape laws are very new, having been enacted during the 2000s. In 2006, the UN Secretary General found that: "Marital rape may be prosecuted in at least 104 States. Of these, 32 have made marital rape a specific criminal offence, while the remaining 74 [sic] do not exempt marital rape from general rape provisions. Four States criminalize marital rape only when the spouses are judicially separated." Since 2006 several other countries have made marital rape illegal.

In December 1993, the United Nations High Commissioner for Human Rights published the Declaration on the Elimination of Violence Against Women. This establishes marital rape as a human rights violation.

The idea that marriage grants either spouse's consent to sex formed the basis for the reason why marital rape is not a universally accepted crime. Traditional perceptions of marriage and of women contribute to the reasons why marital rape is not universally identified as crime. Wives were regarded as the property of the husband, and therefore the husband was not responsible for a crime when he raped his wife since he did not infringe on another man's property rights. In the early 18th century of England, Blackstone's common law united the husband and the wife into a single legal entity upon marriage with the husband having the control of this entity. Although this view evolved to having independent rights for the wife, the concept of marital rape not as a crime went on with few challenges. In 1958, the Encyclopædia Britannica's definition of rape stated as "A husband cannot commit rape upon his wife unless she is legally separated from him."

In the United States, criminalization of marital rape started in the mid-1970s, but it was not until the 1990s when action in regards to marital rape was followed through. Although all fifty states recognized marital rape as a crime on July 5, 1993, not all states treat marital rape the same as other forms of rape (see Marital rape#United States).

In South Asia, marital rape falls under family law rather than criminal law. Marital rape cannot be prosecuted in India and Sri Lanka, unless the couple is separated. The religious laws tend to undermine the legal recognition of marital rape.

==== Honor killings ====
There is very poor data on the practice of honor killing (also known as honor violence) due to the fact that many do not get reported or happen in remote areas or are classified as a different form of crime. This is the situation for the international data and American data, but for American data, no national or state agency collects data on honor violence. However, the practice of honor killings do occur with the family committing acts of honor killing believing that the daughter has become too Westernized and/or after she has refused to follow traditional customs such as arranged marriages. For example, in Phoenix, Arizona, the police arrested a man for murder after he ran down his 20-year-old daughter for refusing to accept an arranged marriage to a man in the family's native country of Iraq. The prosecution of such crimes are carried out in the United States, but the crimes are not identified as honor killings under a form of law. It has been argued that the lack of using the label "honor killings" and instead using the all-encompassing label of "domestic violence" prevents the public from seeing the key differences between honor killings and domestic violence and also prevents any policies limiting and ultimately, putting an end, to the honor killings.

Although a law in 2004 made honor killings illegal in Pakistan, honor killings still occur in Pakistan largely because of the lack of strict enforcement and the tendency of the legal system following the religious law. By creating laws that aligned legal laws with Islamic law, the Hudood Ordinance of Pakistan, enacted in 1979, created obstacles for women victimized of gender-based crimes. Women were required to provide four male witnesses, but if they were unable to do so, the case is not prosecuted. For women who are married, they face the punishment for having sex outside of marriage, which range from stoning to public lashing, and some families will commit honor killings due to the dishonor she has brought upon the family. A bill removed the four male witnesses requirement of the Hudood Ordinances in 2006, but there are allegations that the police force and other law enforcing officials are not necessarily enforcing the law and bill. Women rights advocacy groups have pressured the Pakistani government to respond to the deficiencies, but in March 2005, a bill that sought to strengthen the law against the practice of honor killing was rejected by the Pakistani parliament after being declared as un-Islamic by a majority vote.

==== Female genital mutilation ====
Female genital mutilation (FGM) is a common case of genital mutilation. The act has been practiced in parts of Africa for centuries, but after the United Nations made recommendations in its Convention on the Elimination of All Forms of Discrimination against Women (CEDAW), in the present times, many nations such as Ghana and Egypt have placed laws stopping the practice of FGM through legal means. Despite these laws, FGM continues to be practiced in the communities. In Egypt, FGM is banned by ministerial health decree and not in federal law as of 2007, but FGM is a prevalent practice in Egypt with 90% or more prevalence in girls and women between fifteen and forty-nine years of age. 90% of girls who went through FGM were under fourteen years old. Additionally, an estimated 90% of the procedures are done by doctors or other trained medical personnel. In January 2015 Raslan Fadl, a doctor, became the first in Egypt to be convicted of FGM, following an appeal of his acquittal of the manslaughter of Sohair al-Bataa during an FGM procedure. He was sentenced to two years in jail for manslaughter plus three months for the FGM.

FGM came about to the attention of the American public with a U.S. Board of Immigration Appeals case in which a 17-year-old girl from Togo fled to the U.S. after being forced into a polygamous marriage and told she was to face genital mutilation. The girl was eventually granted asylum In September 1996, Congress enacted the "Federal Prohibition of Female Genital Mutilation Act," which prohibits FGM on persons under 18 years old. A landmark case is that of Khalid Adem who was the first person prosecuted and convicted of FGM in the United States after he circumcised his two-year-old daughter. A native from Ethiopia and living in Georgia, Adem, circumcised his young daughter with a pair of scissors, and the young girl's mother did not find out about the act until two year later. After this case, Georgia enacted a law specifically forbidding the practice of FGM, but Adem, while originally facing forty years in prison, was only sentenced to ten years. Adem's case was the not first case involving FGM for in 2004, two California residents were arrested for conspiring to perform on FGM on young girls.

The first prosecution for FGM in the UK took place in 2014.

== International proceedings ==
=== International Criminal Court ===
The International Criminal Court (ICC) was adopted in 1998 to specifically address war crimes and make advances in the prosecution of crimes committed against women. The Rome Statute of the International Criminal Court, which established the ICC, ensures effective prosecution of all crimes within the jurisdiction of the ICC and particularly mentions crimes involving sexual violence. The ICC appointed a Special Gender Advisor to specially manage the crimes of gender-targeted violence.

The United States has not officially joined as a member state of the ICC since it has not ratified the Rome Statute for the ICC. The lack of United States ratifying the statute is considered as limiting the potential of the ICC to prosecute the gender-targeted crimes.

=== Tribunals ===
A Tribunal is a governmental body that makes up courts with a special jurisdiction. As ad hoc courts, they have specific purposes and are created in a response to certain situations. When it comes to gender-targeted crimes, tribunals hear the trials of the related crimes. Two examples of tribunals that have carried out trials of gender-targeted crimes are the International Criminal Tribunal for Rwanda (ICTR) and the International Criminal Tribunal for the former Yugoslavia (ICTY). These two tribunals have particularly focused on gender-based crimes while other tribunals have not. For example, another failure that the Tokyo Tribunal was its omission to call the female victims to give evidence at trial. The ICTR and ICTY have made improvements in regards to effectively prosecuting gender-targeted crimes and have carried out indictments that charge the accused with gender-based violence other than just rape charges. Women serve in high-level positions of both tribunals and have a prominent role in the prosecution of the gender-based crimes. This has allowed more cases to be heard as the female investigators and lawyers are able to reach out to the victims.

==== International Criminal Tribunal for Rwanda (ICTR) ====
The International Criminal Tribunal for Rwanda (ICTR) was established in November 1994 by the United Nations Security Council with jurisdiction over the crimes committed during the Rwandan genocide. For its first rape indictment, it took the ICTR three years to proceed. Two years after the establishment of the ICTR, a sexual assault unit of the Office of the Prosecutor (OTP) was created with three legal officers, one psychologist, one nurse, two lawyers, two policewomen, and one policeman. Under the ICTR, the sexual assault unit of the (OTP) created a policy to specifically carry out the legal proceedings of rape, genital mutilation, and other gender-targeted crimes. The OTP also has a Rape and Sexual Violence Section. This section under the OTP is headed by a female lawyer-investigator, and the OTP use female investigators and trial lawyers to reach out to the victims of rape and sexual violence, who are mostly women. Before the OTP, it was difficult to prosecute crimes of sexual violence under international criminal law, and because of these aspects, the OTP is considered to have founded the legal developments in the prosecution of gender-targeted crimes in international law.

===== Prosecutor v. Akayesu =====
A landmark case conducted by the OTP is the 1998 conviction of the mayor of Taba commune in south Rwanda, Jean-Paul Akayesu, who directed acts of sexual violence on Tutsi girls and women in the Taba commune. Akayesu was the first person to be convicted of rape and sexual violence charges by an international court, and the case also represented the first international war crimes trial to convict a defendant for the crime of genocide. The case broke through the criminal networks that attempted to protect high-status, powerful political figures such as Akayesu who while not directly carrying out the slaughter, gave out undocumented orders for the mass killings. The case also made the following significant changes

- Recognized sexual violence as a fundamental part of the Rwandan Genocide
- Identified rape and other forms of gender-targeted violence as separate crimes of crimes against humanity
- Provided internationally accepted definitions for rape and sexual violence

- Rape is defined as “a physical invasion of a sexual nature, committed on a person under circumstances which are coercive”
- Sexual violence is defined as to “[include] rape, is considered to be any act of a sexual nature which is committed on a person under circumstances which are coercive”

==== International Criminal Tribunal for the former Yugoslavia (ICTY) ====
The International Criminal Tribunal for the former Yugoslavia was established in 1993 by the United Nations Security Council to conduct the trials of crimes committed during the Yugoslav Wars. Feminist activists played a part in creating the structure of the ICTY over the gender-targeted crimes, and states and international organizations urged criminalizing rape with the main argument that the Geneva Conventions provided the context. This led to the ICTY Statue specifically listing rape as a crime against humanity. Under the Office of the Prosecutor (OTP) of the ICTY, there is a "Legal Advisor for Gender-related Crimes" position that directs the prosecution's dealings with gender-based crimes similar to the one made in the International Criminal Tribunal for Rwanda (ICTR). ICTY has a Victims and Witnesses Unit that provides support and counseling to victims and witnesses particularly in rape and sexual assault cases, and the unit is employed by women.

Three cases – Čelebići, Furundžija, and Kunarac – are examples of the ICTY making indictments of gender-targeted violence.

In Kunarac, The ICTY convicted Serbian men of confining Bosnian Muslim women under the charges of enslavement, which was listed as a crime against humanity in the Statue. There are arguments that the accused should have been found guilty of sexual slavery and of genocide rather than enslavement.

Furundžija was a commander of the Jokers – a unit of the Bosnian Croatian Militia, which allegedly attacked villages of Bosnian Muslims through imprisonment, murder, sexual abuse, and other forms of violence – he was accused of participating in the torture involving forced sexual intercourse of a woman at the Jokers' headquarters. The prosecution depended on the testimony of the woman, and this drew debate over the credibility of the victim's memory. The case led to the concern for the survivors of traumatic events in addition to the victims.

The Čelebići case found four men guilty for committing various acts of violence while detaining Bosnian Muslims in a prison camp. The case is noteworthy for clarifying that the ones responsible of such events include "not only military commanders, but also civilians holding positions of authority..." and "not only persons in de jure positions but also those in such position de facto..." It is also the first conviction of an accused person for the charges of rape by the ICTY.

== See also ==
- Gender and security sector reform
