= Thames Valley District School Board =

Public school board in southwestern Ontario, Canada

Thames Valley District School Board TVDSB

Location
- London, Ontario Greater London and all of Elgin, Middlesex and Oxford Counties Canada
- Coordinates: 42.9965°N 81.2067°W

District information
- Motto: We build each student's tomorrow, every day.
- Grades: K-12
- Established: January 1, 1998
- Schools: 184, 30 secondary, 154 elementary
- Budget: CA $1.1 billion

Students and staff
- Students: 80k

Other information
- Chair of the Board: Beth Mai
- Vice-chair of the Board: Dave Cripps
- Chief executive officer: Kevin Auckland
- Elected trustees: 15: 6 representing London; 2 each for Elgin, Middlesex and Oxford; 1 Indigenous representative; 3 non-voting student trustees.
- Website: www.tvdsb.ca

The Thames Valley District School Board (TVDSB; known as English-language Public District School Board No. 11 prior to 1999) is a public school board in southwestern Ontario, Canada.

The TVDSB serves an area over 7,000 square kilometres which includes urban, suburban and rural communities. It spans three counties and includes the cities of London, St. Thomas, and Woodstock, plus the towns of Ingersoll, Aylmer, Tillsonburg, and Strathroy-Caradoc, as well as several smaller towns and villages.

As of 2024, the Board administered 160 schools (134 elementary and 26 secondary schools). They also provide alternative education programs for approximately 40,000 students through adult day school, continuing education, general interest, night school and summer school courses.

== History ==
It was created on January 1, 1998, by the amalgamation of the Elgin County Board of Education, The Board of Education for the City of London, Middlesex County Board of Education, and Oxford County Board of Education.

Eight future elementary schools are currently under construction or are in planning stages, with two school additions and a high school in St. Thomas under construction as of 2026.

=== Controversies ===
In 2021, the Thames Valley District School Board was named as a defendant in a civil lawsuit related to the sexually inappropriate behaviour of one of its teachers, Ryan Jarvis. Jarvis filmed at least 27 teenage students with a spy camera while he was an English teacher at H. B. Beal Secondary School. He used a camera concealed in a pen to film his female students' breasts. Jarvis became the first person in Canada to serve jail time for a voyeurism conviction. Jarvis's teaching license was revoked following his conviction. The Thames Valley District School Board was the setting of R v. Jarvis, 2019 SCC 10 a precedent-setting case of voyeurism in Canada.

In 2021, Lawrence Thompson, a custodian at a TVDSB elementary school, was found guilty of four counts of kidnapping and sexual assault of a four-year-old girl. During the investigation in 2018, the school board indicated it would fully cooperate with police and local law enforcement authorities. However, the TVDSB declined to provide a list of schools that the janitor previously worked at.

In 2024, the TVDSB, and several other school boards, came under scrutiny for sending officials on trips and retreats. TVDSB executives attended a retreat at the hotel in the Rogers Centre, where the Toronto Blue Jays play baseball. Though the executives paid for the trip from their own expense accounts, the optics of going on a trip when the board was in a deficit position was enough to cause the provincial government to audit their finances. After the scandal broke, director of education Mark Fisher was put on paid leave. In 2026, the position was removed by the provincial government and replaced by the role of chief executive officer.

== Trustees ==
Current trustees for the 2026–2030 term:

- Chair -
- Vice Chair -

| Trustee | Wards | City |
|---|---|---|
| Sheri Polhill | 1, 11, 12, 14 | London |
| Lori-Ann Pizzolato | 1, 11, 12, 14 | London |
| Paul Gray | 2, 3, 4, 5, 6 | London |
| David Ross | 2, 3, 4, 5, 6 | London |
| Lincoln McCardle | 7, 8, 9, 10, 13 | London |
| Sherri Moore | 7, 8, 9, 10, 13 | London |
| Dave Cripps | Oxford County | Oxford County |
| Leeanne Hopkins | Oxford County | Oxford County |
| Arlene Morell | Middlesex County | Middlesex County |
| Christian Sachs | Middlesex County | Middlesex County |
| Meagan Ruddock | Elgin County | Elgin County |
| Bruce Smith | Elgin County | Elgin County |
| Carol Antone | All First Nations | N/A |

== List of schools ==
The following is a list of the schools administered by the TVDSB and their towns/city:

=== Secondary schools ===
- A. B. Lucas Secondary School – London
- Under construction – St. Thomas
- Central Elgin Collegiate Institute – St. Thomas
- London Central Secondary School – London
- Clarke Road Secondary School – London
- College Avenue Secondary School – Woodstock
- East Elgin Secondary School – Aylmer
- Glencoe District High School – Glencoe
- Glendale High School – Tillsonburg
- H. B. Beal Secondary School – London
- Huron Park Secondary School – Woodstock
- Ingersoll District Collegiate Institute – Ingersoll
- London South Collegiate Institute – London
- Lord Dorchester Secondary School – Dorchester
- Medway High School – Arva
- Montcalm Secondary School – London
- North Middlesex District High School – Parkhill
- Oakridge Secondary School – London
- Parkside Collegiate Institute (incl. French Immersion) – St. Thomas
- Saunders Secondary School – London
- Sir Frederick Banting Secondary School (incl. French Immersion) – London
- Sir Wilfrid Laurier Secondary School (incl. French Immersion) – London
- Strathroy District Collegiate Institute (incl. French Immersion) – Strathroy-Caradoc
- Thames Valley Alternative Secondary School (teachers located throughout the entire Board district)
- West Elgin Secondary School – West Lorne
- Westminster Secondary School - London
- Woodstock Collegiate Institute (incl. French Immersion) – Woodstock

== See also ==
- Conseil scolaire catholique Providence – French Catholic School Board
- Conseil scolaire Viamonde – French Public School Board
- List of English public schools in London Ontario
- List of high schools in Ontario
- List of school districts in Ontario
- London District Catholic School Board – English Catholic School Board
