= École secondaire Gabriel-Dumont =

Location
- 2463 Evans Boulevard; London, Ontario, N6M 0B1; Canada; 42.9516°N 81.1716°W

Information
- School type: French-language high school
- Founded: 1998
- School board: Conseil scolaire Viamonde
- School number: 910554
- Principal: Julie Petruniak
- Grades: 7–12
- Enrollment: 470 (2022 estimate)
- Language: French
- Colours: blue and yellow
- Website: gabrieldumont.csviamonde.ca
- Last updated: June 20, 2009

École secondaire Gabriel-Dumont is a public French first language high school in London, Ontario, Canada. It is located in south-east London on Evans Boulevard, in the Summerside subdivision. It is named after Métis leader Gabriel Dumont. Gabriel-Dumont teaches Grades 7 to 12.

== History ==
Proportionate to its size, London has a small francophone population; however, it qualifies for French language services under the French Language Services Act, and also qualifies to have French schools. While there have been French elementary schools in London since 1972, it was not until 1979 that a French high school was created. Originally, the school comprised one class at London Central Secondary School. Over time, the program grew to include several subjects and became known as Le Module scolaire de langue française (MSLF). Due to changes in the organizational structure of the education system in Ontario, the MSLF became Gabriel-Dumont in 1998.

Gariel-Dumont moved out of the building it shared with London Central Secondary School, and into the same building as the French Catholic high school, École secondaire catholique Monseigneur-Bruyère of the Conseil scolaire catholique Providence.

In October 2012, Gabriel-Dumont moved from its location within the Le Centre Desloges (CDL) project and into its own building on Evans Boulevard.

== Notable alumni ==
Notable alumni include:

- Shad, hip hop musician (École secondaire Gabriel-Dumont)
- Andrew Gunadie, video producer/musician (École secondaire Gabriel-Dumont)
- Arielle Kayabaga, Member of Parliament for London West (École secondaire Gabriel-Dumont)

== See also ==
- Education in Ontario
- List of secondary schools in Ontario
