= List of postal codes of Canada: N =

This is a list of postal codes in Canada where the first letter is N. Postal codes beginning with N are located within the Canadian province of Ontario. Only the first three characters are listed, corresponding to the Forward Sortation Area (FSA).

Canada Post provides a free postal code look-up tool on its website, via its mobile apps for such smartphones as the iPhone and BlackBerry, and sells hard-copy directories and CD-ROMs. Many vendors also sell validation tools, which allow customers to properly match addresses and postal codes. Hard-copy directories can also be consulted in all post offices, and some libraries.

== Southwestern Ontario ==
There are currently 120 FSAs in this list.

=== Urban ===
| N1A; Dunnville | N2A; Kitchener; East | N3A; New Hamburg (Baden) | N4A; Not assigned | N5A; Stratford; North | N6A; London; North (UWO) | N7A; Goderich | N8A; Wallaceburg | N9A; Windsor (City Centre / NW Walkerville) |
| N1B; Not assigned | N2B; Kitchener; Northeast | N3B; Elmira | N4B; Delhi | N5B; Not assigned | N6B; London; Central | N7B; Not assigned | N8B; Not assigned | N9B; Windsor (University / South Cameron) |
| N1C; Guelph; South | N2C; Kitchener; South Central | N3C; Cambridge; Northeast | N4C; Not assigned | N5C; Ingersoll | N6C; London; South (East Highland / North White Oaks / North Westminster) | N7C; Not assigned | N8C; Not assigned | N9C; Windsor (Sandwich / Ojibway / West Malden) |
| N1E; Guelph; North | N2E; Kitchener; Southwest | N3E; Cambridge; Northwest | N4E; Not assigned | N5E; Not assigned | N6E; London (South White Oaks / Central Westminster / East Longwoods / West Brockley) | N7E; Not assigned | N8E; Not assigned | N9E; Windsor; South (East Malden) |
| N1G; Guelph; Central | N2G; Kitchener; Central | N3G; Not assigned | N4G; Tillsonburg | N5G; Not assigned | N6G; London (Sunningdale / West Masonville / Medway / NE Hyde Park / East Fox Hollow) | N7G; Strathroy-Caradoc | N8G; Not assigned | N9G; Windsor (Roseland) |
| N1H; Guelph; Northwest | N2H; Kitchener; North Central | N3H; Cambridge; West | N4H; Not assigned | N5H; Aylmer | N6H; London; West (Central Hyde Park / Oakridge) | N7H; Not assigned | N8H; Leamington | N9H; LaSalle; East (Windsor) |
| N1J; Not assigned | N2J; Waterloo; Southeast | N3J; Not assigned | N4J; Not assigned | N5J; Not assigned | N6J; London (Southcrest / East Westmount / West Highland) | N7J; Not assigned | N8J; Not assigned | N9J; La Salle; West (Windsor) |
| N1K; Guelph; West | N2K; Waterloo; East | N3K; Not assigned | N4K; Owen Sound | N5K; Not assigned | N6K; London (Riverbend / Woodhull / North Sharon Creek / Byron / West Westmount) | N7K; Not assigned | N8K; Not assigned | N9K; Windsor |
| N1L; Guelph; East | N2L; Waterloo; South | N3L; Paris | N4L; Meaford | N5L; Port Stanley | N6L; London (East Tempo) | N7L; Chatham–Kent; Northwest | N8L; Belle River | N9L; Not assigned |
| N1M; Fergus | N2M; Kitchener; Northwest | N3M; Not assigned | N4M; Not assigned | N5M; Not assigned | N6M; London (Jackson / Old Victoria / Bradley / North Highbury) | N7M; Chatham–Kent; Southeast | N8M; Essex | N9M; Not assigned |
| N1N; Not assigned | N2N; Kitchener; West | N3N; Not assigned | N4N; Hanover | N5N; Not assigned | N6N; London (South Highbury / Glanworth / East Brockley / SE Westminster) | N7N; Not assigned | N8N; Tecumseh; Outskirts (Windsor) | N9N; Not assigned |
| N1P; Cambridge; South | N2P; Kitchener; Southeast | N3P; Brantford; Northeast | N4P; Not assigned | N5P; St. Thomas; North | N6P; London (Talbot / Lambeth / West Tempo / South Sharon Creek) | N7P; Not assigned | N8P; Windsor (East Riverside) | N9P; Not assigned |
| N1R; Cambridge; Central | N2R; Kitchener; South | N3R; Brantford; Central | N4R; Not assigned | N5R; St. Thomas; South | N6R; Not assigned | N7R; Not assigned | N8R; Windsor (East Forest Glade) | N9R; Not assigned |
| N1S; Cambridge; Southwest | N2S; Not assigned | N3S; Brantford; Southeast | N4S; Woodstock; Central | N5S; Not assigned | N6S; Not assigned | N7S; Sarnia; Central | N8S; Windsor (Riverside) | N9S; Not assigned |
| N1T; Cambridge; East | N2T; Waterloo; Southwest | N3T; Brantford; Southwest | N4T; Woodstock; North | N5T; Not assigned | N6T; Not assigned | N7T; Sarnia; Southwest | N8T; Windsor (West Forest Glade / East Fontainbleu) | N9T; Not assigned |
| N1V; Not assigned | N2V; Waterloo; Northwest | N3V; Brantford; Northwest | N4V; Woodstock; South | N5V; London (YXU / North and East Argyle / East Huron Heights) | N6V; Not assigned | N7V; Sarnia; Northwest | N8V; Windsor (YQG) | N9V; Amherstburg |
| N1W; Not assigned | N2W; Not assigned | N3W; Caledonia | N4W; Listowel | N5W; London; East (SW Argyle / Hamilton Road) | N6W; Not assigned | N7W; Sarnia; Southeast | N8W; Windsor (South Walkerville / West Fontainbleu / Walker Farm / Devonshire) | N9W; Not assigned |
| N1X; Not assigned | N2X; Not assigned | N3X; Not assigned | N4X; St. Marys | N5X; London (Fanshawe / Stoneybrook / Stoney Creek / Uplands / East Masonville) | N6X; Not assigned | N7X; Sarnia; Northeast | N8X; Windsor; South Central (West Walkerville / Remington Park) | N9X; Not assigned |
| N1Y; Not assigned | N2Y; Not assigned | N3Y; Simcoe | N4Y; Not assigned | N5Y; London (West Huron Heights / Carling) | N6Y; Not assigned | N7Y; Not assigned | N8Y; Windsor; East (East Walkerville) | N9Y; Kingsville |
| N1Z; Not assigned | N2Z; Kincardine | N3Z; Not assigned | N4Z; Stratford; South | N5Z; London (Glen Cairn) | N6Z; Not assigned | N7Z; Not assigned | N8Z; Not assigned | N9Z; Not assigned |

=== Rural ===
N0A
West Haldimand County

1C0: Canfield
1E0: Cayuga
1G0: Fisherville
1H0: Hagersville
1J0: Jarvis
1K0: Lowbanks
1L0: Nanticoke
1M0: Ohsweken
1N0: Port Dover
1P0: Selkirk
1R0: York
1S0: Townsend

N0B
Wellington County & Rural Waterloo Region

1A0: Alma
1B0: Ariss
1C0: Arkell
1E0: Ayr
1H0: Ballinafad
1J0: Belwood
1K0: Bloomingdale
1L0: Branchton
1M0: Breslau
1N0: Conestogo
1P0: Eden Mills
1S0: Elora
1T0: Erin
1V0: Floradale
1W0: Glen Morris
1X0: Hawkesville
1Z0: Hillsburgh
2A0: Linwood
2B0: Maryhill
2C0: Morriston
2E0: New Dundee
2H0: Petersburg
2J0: Puslinch
2K0: Rockwood
2L0: St. Agatha
2M0: St. Clements
2N0: St. Jacobs
2P0: Shakespeare
2R0: Tavistock
2S0: Wallenstein
2T0: Wellesley
2V0: West Montrose

N0C
Georgian Bay Southwest Shore

1A0: Badjeros
1B0: Dundalk
1C0: Feversham
1E0: Flesherton
1G0: Kimberley
1H0: Markdale
1J0: Maxwell
1K0: Priceville
1L0: Proton Station
1M0: Singhampton

N0E
Brant and Norfolk Counties

1A0: Burford
1B0: Cathcart
1C0: Clear Creek
1E0: Harley
1G0: Langton
1H0: La Salette
1K0: Mount Pleasant
1L0: Oakland
1M0: Port Rowan
1N0: St. George
1P0: St. Williams
1R0: Scotland
1S0: Teeterville
1T0: Turkey Point
1V0: Vanessa
1W0: Vittoria
1X0: Walsingham
1Y0: Waterford
1Z0: Wilsonville
2A0: Windham Centre

N0G
Southern Bruce and Huron Counties

1A0: Arthur
1B0: Atwood
1C0: Ayton
1E0: Belgrave
1G0: Bluevale
1H0: Brussels
1J0: Cargill
1K0: Chepstow
1L0: Chesley
1M0: Clifford
1N0: Conn
1P0: Drayton
1R0: Durham
1S0: Elmwood
1T0: Ethel
1V0: Fordwich
1W0: Formosa
1X0: Gorrie
1Y0: Gowanstown
1Z0: Harriston
2A0: Holstein
2B0: Holyrood
2E0: Kenilworth
2H0: Lucknow
2J0: Mildmay
2K0: Moorefield
2L0: Mount Forest
2M0: Neustadt
2N0: Paisley
2P0: Palmerston
2R0: Ripley
2S0: Teeswater
2T0: Tiverton
2V0: Walkerton
2W0: Wingham
2X0: Wroxeter

N0H
Bruce Peninsula

0A0: Port Elgin
1A0: Allenford
1B0: Annan
1C0: Berkeley
1E0: Bognor
1G0: Chatsworth
1J0: Clarksburg
1K0: Desboro
1L0: Dobbinton
1N0: Heathcote
1P0: Hepworth
1R0: Holland Centre
1S0: Kemble
1V0: Leith
1W0: Lion's Head
1X0: Mar
1Z0: Miller Lake
2C0: Port Elgin
2E0: Ravenna
2G0: Sauble Beach
2K0: Shallow Lake
2L0: Southampton
2M0: Stokes Bay
2N0: Tara
2P0: Thornbury
2R0: Tobermory
2S0: Walters Falls
2T0: Wiarton
2V0: Williamsford

N0J
Oxford County

1A0: Beachville
1B0: Bright
1C0: Burgessville
1E0: Courtland
1G0: Drumbo
1H0: Eden
1J0: Embro
1L0: Hickson
1M0: Innerkip
1N0: Mount Elgin
1P0: Norwich
1R0: Otterville
1S0: Plattsville
1T0: Port Burwell
1V0: Princeton
1W0: Salford
1X0: Springford
1Y0: Straffordville
1Z0: Vienna

N0K
Perth County

1A0: Bornholm
1B0: Brodhagen
1C0: Brunner
1E0: Dublin
1G0: Egmondville
1H0: Fullarton
1J0: Gads Hill
1K0: Kirkton
1L0: Millbank
1M0: Milverton
1N0: Mitchell
1P0: Monkton
1R0: Newton
1S0: Poole
1T0: Rostock
1V0: St. Pauls
1W0: Seaforth
1X0: Sebringville
1Y0: Staffa
1Z0: Walton
2A0: Woodham

N0L
Elgin County

1A0: Appin
1B0: Belmont
1C0: Brownsville
1E0: Delaware
1G0: Dorchester
1H0: Duart
1J0: Dutton
1K0: Fingal
1M0: Glencoe
1N0: Harrietsville
1P0: Iona Station
1R0: Komoka
1T0: Melbourne
1V0: Mossley
1W0: Mount Brydges
1X0: Muirkirk
1Y0: Muncey
1Z0: Newbury
2B0: Putnam
2C0: Rodney
2E0: Shedden
2G0: Southwold
2H0: Sparta
2J0: Springfield
2K0: Talbotville Royal
2L0: Union
2M0: Wallacetown
2N0: Wardsville
2P0: West Lorne

N0M
Middlesex County

1A0: Ailsa Craig
1B0: Arkona
1C0: Arva
1E0: Auburn
1G0: Bayfield
1H0: Blyth
1J0: Brucefield
1K0: Centralia
1L0: Clinton
1M0: Crediton
1N0: Dashwood
1P0: Denfield
1R0: Dungannon
1S0: Exeter
1T0: Grand Bend
1V0: Granton
1W0: Hay
1X0: Hensall
1Y0: Huron Park
2A0: Ilderton
2B0: Kerwood
2C0: Kintore
2E0: Kippen
2G0: Lakeside
2H0: Londesborough
2J0: Lucan
2K0: Parkhill
2L0: Port Franks
2M0: Thamesford
2N0: Thedford
2P0: Thorndale
2R0: Varna
2S0: Watford
2T0: Zurich
3S0: Exeter

N0N
Lambton County

1A0: Alvinston
1B0: Brigden
1C0: Bright's Grove
1E0: Camlachie
1G0: Corunna
1H0: Courtright
1J0: Forest
1K0: Inwood
1M0: Mooretown
1N0: Oil City
1P0: Oil Springs
1R0: Petrolia
1T0: Wyoming

N0P
Kent County

1A0: Blenheim
1C0: Bothwell
1E0: Cedar Springs
1G0: Charing Cross
1H0: Coatsworth Station
1J0: Comber
1K0: Croton
1L0: Dover Centre
1M0: Dresden
1N0: Erieau
1R0: Florence
1S0: Grande Pointe
1T0: Highgate
1V0: Kent Bridge
1W0: Merlin
1X0: Morpeth
1Y0: North Buxton
1Z0: Pain Court
2A0: Port Alma
2B0: Port Lambton
2C0: Ridgetown
2G0: Ruthven
2H0: Sombra
2J0: Staples
2K0: Thamesville
2L0: Tilbury
2M0: Tupperville
2P0: Wheatley
2R0: Wilkesport

N0R
Essex County

1A0: Belle River
1B0: Cottam
1C0: Emeryville
1G0: Harrow
1J0: McGregor
1K0: Maidstone
1L0: Oldcastle
1M0: Pelee Island
1N0: Pointe aux Roches
1R0: Ruscom Station
1S0: St. Joachim
1V0: South Woodslee

N0S
Not in use
N0T
Not in use
N0V
Not in use
N0W
Not in use
N0X
Not in use
N0Y
Not in use
N0Z
Not in use

== Most populated FSAs ==
1. N0G, 86,935
2. N0B, 86,919
3. N0M, 69,177
4. N0H, 53,674
5. N0P, 53,140

== Least populated FSAs ==
1. N6N, 728
2. N7X, 1,129
3. N3V, 1,562
4. N4Z, 2,362
5. N7W, 2,578
