= White Oaks, London =

White Oaks
- Neighbourhood
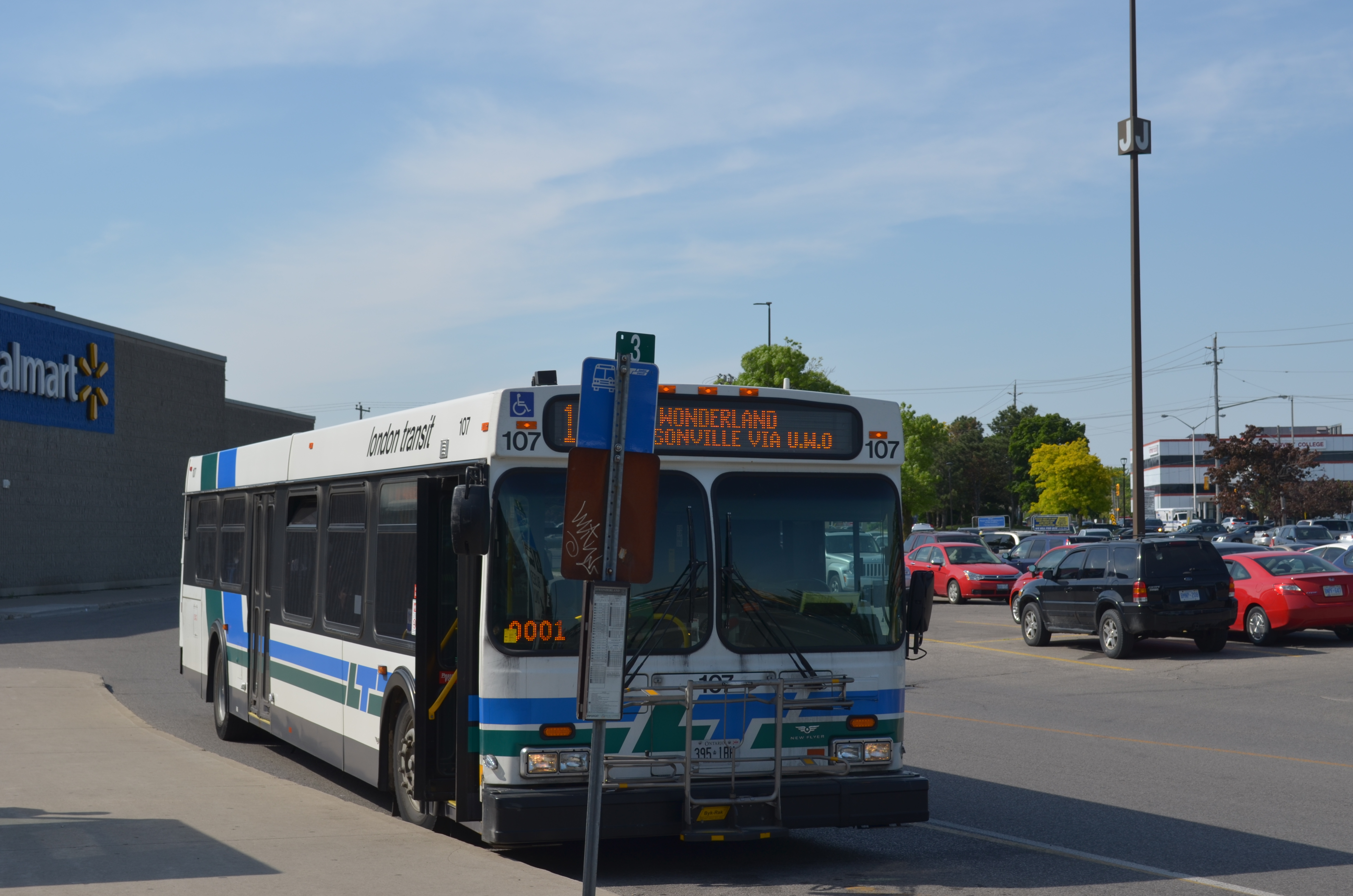
- View outside White Oaks Mall
- Interactive map of White Oaks
- Coordinates: 42°56′13″N 81°14′05″W
- Country: Canada
- Province: Ontario
- City: London

Government
  - MP: Kurt Holman (London—Fanshawe)
  - MPP: Teresa Armstrong (London—Fanshawe)
  - Councillor: Elizabeth Peloza (Ward 12)

Population (2021)
  - Total: 20,555
- Postal code: N6E, N6C

White Oaks is a large suburban neighbourhood in London, Ontario, Canada. Located in the southern part of the city, it is generally bounded by Southdale Road to the north, Exeter Road to the south, White Oak Road to the west, and Wellington Road to the east. The neighbourhood is notably the location of White Oaks Mall, one of the largest in London.

== History ==
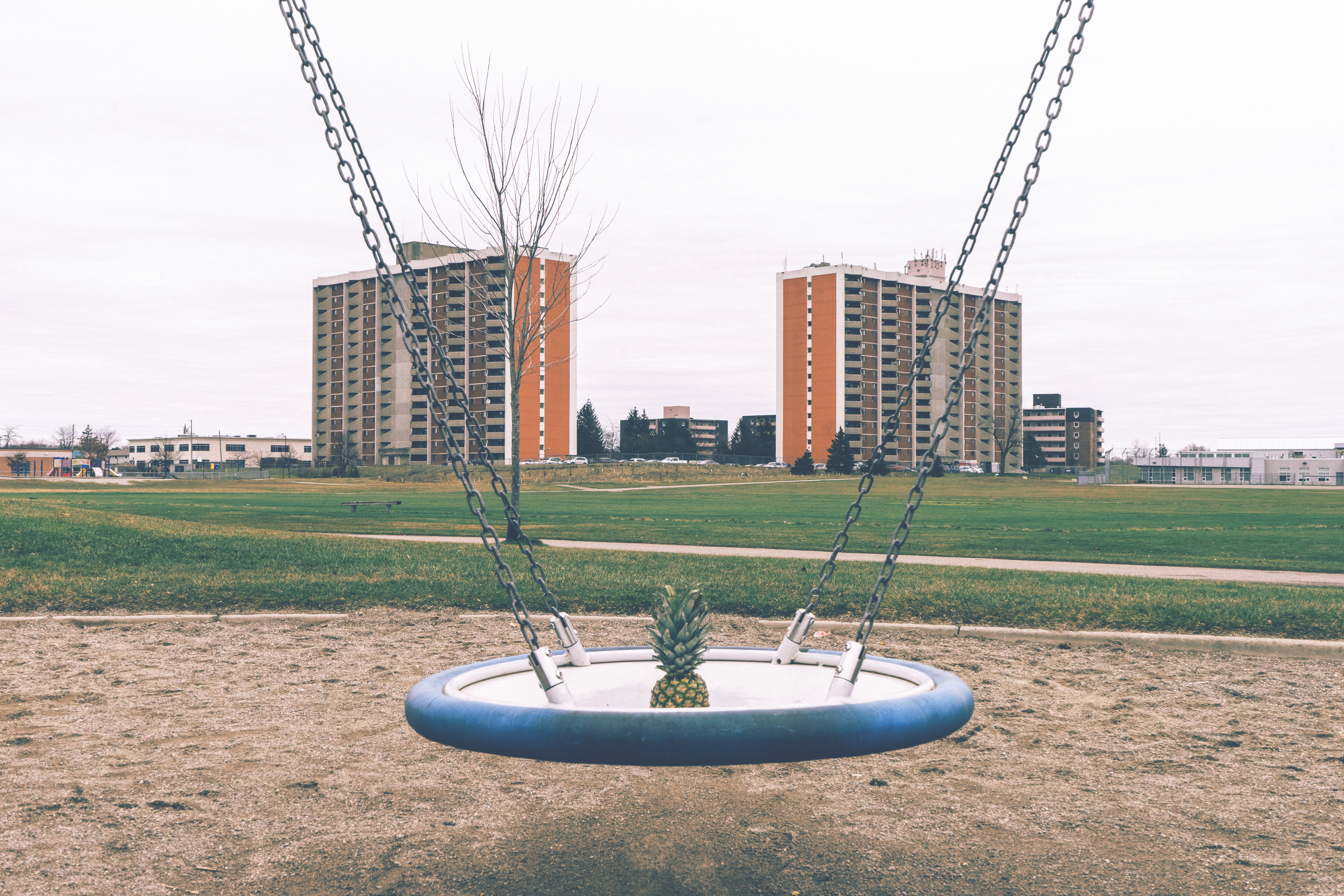
White Oaks Park

The present-day area of White Oaks primarily began to grow between the 1970s and 1980s, when many single-family homes began to be constructed. Later, many high-rises and townhomes were constructed. Homeownership in the community remains high. It is located just north of Highway 401.

Parts of the area are named after the Jalna novels by Mazo de la Roche.

The neighbourhood is served by the South London Community Pool and South London Community Centre, along with the Jalna Branch of the London Public Library.

Opened in 1973, White Oaks Mall is a large shopping mall in the area and includes an IKEA and is part of Rapid Transit's Wellington Gateway.

As per the 2021 Canadian Census, White Oaks has a population of 20,555, almost evenly split between women and men. The median age is 15 to 64 years old. Although primarily White, the neighbourhood has a significant Arab population.

In 2025, an apartment building caught fire in White Oaks.

== Politics ==
Federally, White Oaks has been represented by the southeastern riding of London—Fanshawe. A longtime New Democratic Party stronghold, the Conservative Party's Kurt Holman gained the seat in the 2025 Canadian federal election.

Provincially, White Oaks has been represented by the southeastern riding of London—Fanshawe. A longtime Ontario New Democratic Party stronghold, the riding has been represented by the NDP's Teresa Armstrong since the 2011 Ontario general election.

Municipally, White Oaks has been represented by Elizabeth Peloza at London City Council since the 2018 London, Ontario, municipal election.

== Education ==
Fanshawe College's former London South Campus was located in White Oaks. The location was formerly home to Westervelt College.

There are numerous elementary schools in the area. They include:

- White Oaks Public School (Thames Valley District School Board)
- Ashley Oaks Public School (Thames Valley District School Board)
- Cleardale Public School (Thames Valley District School Board)
- Sir Arthur Carty Catholic School (London District Catholic School Board)
- St. Anthony French Immersion Catholic Elementary School (London District Catholic School Board)
- Rick Hansen Public School (Thames Valley District School Board)
