= Huron Heights, London, Ontario =

Huron Heights
- Neighbourhood
- Interactive map of Huron Heights
- Coordinates: 43°1′23.02″N 81°12′17.071″W
- Country: Canada
- Province: Ontario
- City: London
- Annexation (city): 1961 (as London)

Government
  - Type: Municipal (Ward 3)
  - Administrative body: London City Council
  - Councillor: Peter Cuddy

Population (2011)
  - Total: 19,470
  - Average Income: $25,836
- Time zone: UTC-5 (Eastern Time Zone)
  - Summer (DST): UTC-4 (Eastern Time Zone)
- Postal code: N5V
- Area codes: 519, 226

Huron Heights is a neighbourhood in the City of London, Ontario, Canada. Located in the northeast part of the city, development began around 1960 and continued to the late 1960s in four distinct phases (one of which was commonly known as Huron Village), and included three public elementary schools, and provided students to one Catholic elementary in the area and one public secondary school just northwest of the development. A large commercial plaza with anchor grocery and department stores was developed at the west edge, and a neighbourhood plaza was developed in the central part. A city arena was built and later supplemented with a public swimming pool.

Huron Heights consists mostly of low-density, single detached dwellings. As of 2011, the area is home to 19,470 residents. Most of the neighbourhood is considered a lower-income area with an average family income of $71,288, an average dwelling value of $231,279 and a home ownership rate of 57%.

It also is home to thousands of students residents from Fanshawe College and the University of Western Ontario.

Huron Heights was home to Canada's first Kmart store at Huron Heights Shopping Centre (1345 Huron Street) in March 1963.

== Government and politics ==
Huron Heights exists within the federal electoral district of London-Fanshawe. It is currently represented by Lindsay Mathyssen of the New Democratic Party, first elected in 2019.

Provincially, the area is within the constituency of London-Fanshawe. It is currently represented by Teresa Armstrong of the New Democratic, first elected in 2011 and re-elected in 2014, 2018, and 2022.

In London's non-partisan municipal politics, Huron Heights lies within ward 3. It is currently represented by Councillor Peter Cuddy, first elected in 2022.

== Institutions ==
=== Education ===
- Fanshawe College - public college of applied arts and technology, based in London.
- Montcalm Secondary School - public secondary school and part of the Thames Valley District School Board.
- John Paul II Catholic Secondary School - separate (Catholic) secondary school and part of the London District Catholic School Board.
- Chippewa Public School - public elementary school and part of the Thames Valley District School Board.
- Evelyn Harrison Public School - public elementary school and part of the Thames Valley District School Board.
- St. Anne Catholic School - separate (Catholic) elementary school and part of the London District Catholic School Board.
- Huron Heights Public School existed c. 1960 to the 1980s, and has been torn down in the 2010s following use as a French immersion school.

== Location ==
The neighbourhood is bordered by Oxford Street to the south, Clarke Road to the east, the Thames River to the north (though development is south of the pre-1993 city limit line), and Highbury Avenue to the west. It is bordered by the residential neighbourhoods of Argyle, London Junction, Carling, Merwin Heights, Ridgeview, Stoneybrook, and Fanshawe, as well as the mainly industrial Airport neighbourhood.

Huron Heights Phase One consisted of the area to the southeast of Highbury and Huron, extending to Cheapside and Stronach Park; Phase Two extended from Sandford (an unintended access road later established as a public highway on proving to be a necessary access) to Sorrel Road; Phase Three extended east of Sorrel to Kaladar Drive; Phase Four, often known as Huron Village, was located immediately to the north, its west edge being defined by Pawnee Crescent and Aponi Crescent. Phase One streets appear to have personal names; Phase Two and Three appear to have references to British peers; Phase Four streets have non-traditional (e.g. European-applied) names of First Nations tribes, though Cheyenne Avenue was renamed Oakville Avenue. After the mid-1980s, extensive tracts of remaining land north of Huron Street were developed with row housing and additional streets, north to the 1961-1992 city limit line.
