= Holy Cross Catholic Secondary School (Strathroy) =

Coordinates: 42.9814°N 81.6065°W

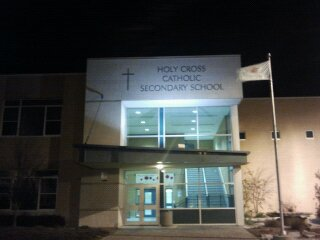

Location
- 367 Second Street; Strathroy, Ontario, N7G 4K6; Canada

Information
- School type: High School
- Motto: Fortis In Concordia (Strong In Concord or Together We Are Stronger)
- Religious affiliation: Roman Catholic
- Founded: 2002
- School board: London District Catholic School Board
- Superintendent: Ana Paula Fernandes
- School number: 10175
- Principal: John Marinelli
- Grades: 9 to 12
- Enrollment: 440 (September 2018)
- Language: English
- Area: Strathroy
- Team name: Centurions
- Website: hcc.ldcsb.ca
- Last updated: February 16, 2019

Holy Cross Catholic Secondary School is a Catholic secondary school in Strathroy, Ontario, administered by the London District Catholic School Board.

== History ==
Holy Cross Catholic Secondary school opened its doors in 2002. It was the first Catholic Secondary School in Western Middlesex County. It started off with a population of 126 students, and with Grades 9s and 10s. Each year after, a new grade was added on. The school had its first graduating class in 2005. The school is a unique one, as it shares facilities with another school, S.D.C.I (Stratroy District Collegiate Institute), which is part of the TVDSB. Both schools also share a complex with the town of Strathroy.

== See also ==
- Education in Ontario
- List of secondary schools in Ontario
