= Regina Mundi Catholic College =

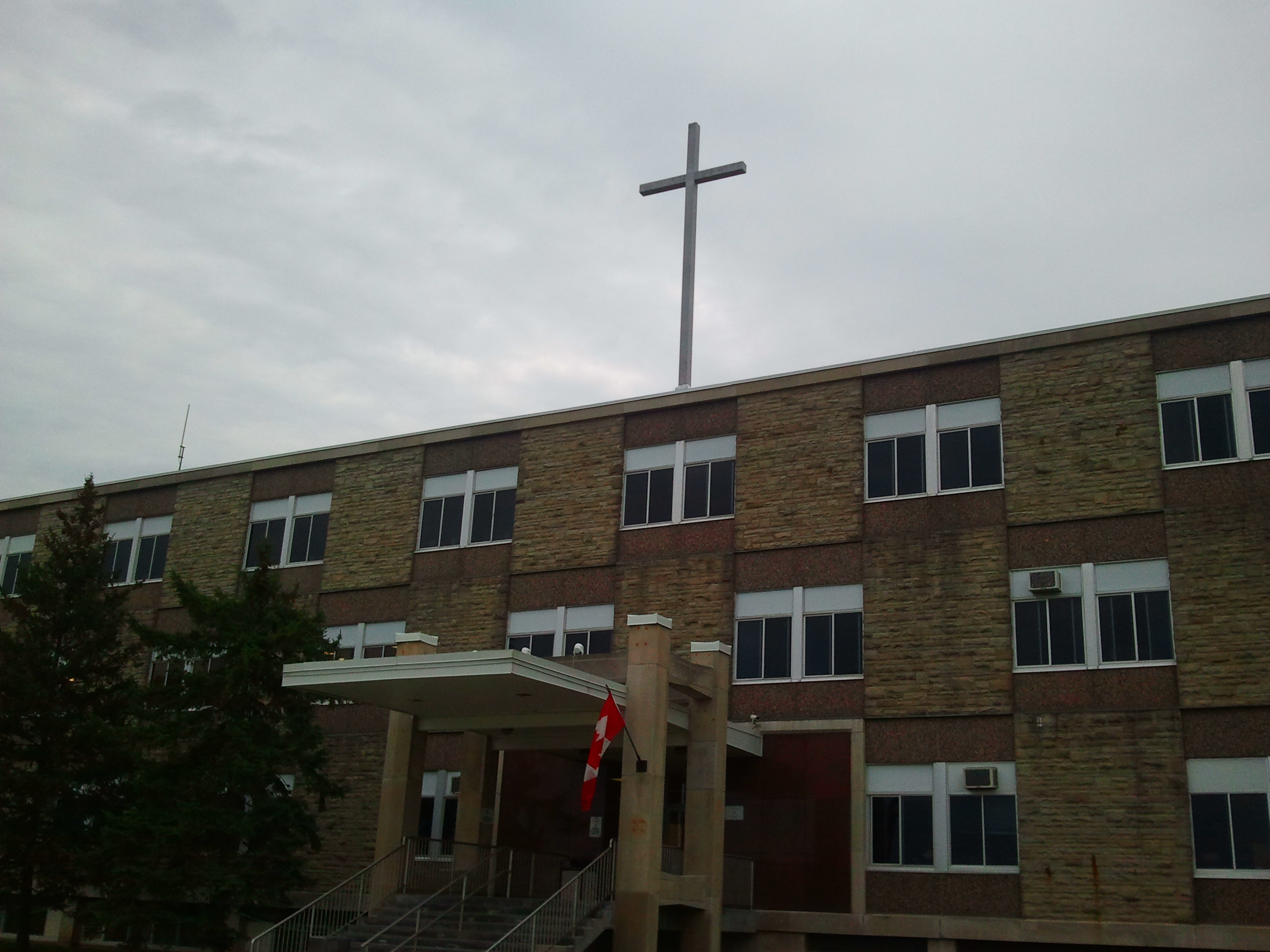
- Original facility

Location
- 5250 Wellington Road South; London, Ontario, N6E 3X8; Canada; 42.8946°N 81.2013°W

Information
- School type: High School
- Motto: Valeam Tibi Servire ("That I may be worthy to serve you")
- Religious affiliation: Roman Catholic
- Founded: 1963
- School board: London District Catholic School Board
- School number: 3610
- Principal: Kevin Barnes
- Grades: 9-12
- Enrollment: 850 (September 2024)
- Language: English
- Area: South London
- Colours: Blue & Gold
- Mascot: Titan Boy
- Team name: The Titans
- Website: rmc.ldcsb.ca
- Last updated: January 25, 2025

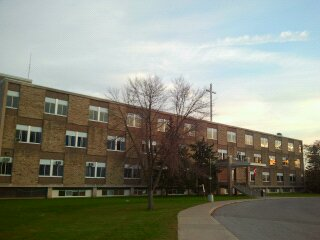
Regina Mundi Catholic College.

Regina Mundi Catholic College (RMC) is a Catholic secondary school in London, Ontario, Canada, administered by the London District Catholic School Board.

== History ==
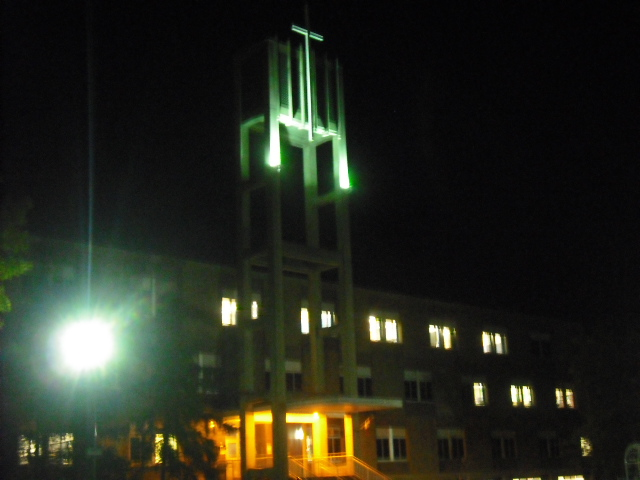
The front of Regina Mundi College prior to failure and deconstruction of the bell tower.

Regina Mundi, meaning "Queen of the World", began as a junior seminary. The school is known by the abbreviation "RMC". The building was commissioned in 1963 by Bishop John Cody to be an institution for training candidates entering the diocesan priesthood. RMC attracted international students and from across Canada. In 1967, the school was renamed from Regina Mundi Seminary to Regina Mundi College.

By 1983, enrollment in the Catholic education system began to grow in the London area; at the time, Catholic Central High School was the only secondary school for Catholic Education. It was that year that the school joined the LDCSB system. RMC became co-ed at this time, and a new wing was added featuring a gymnasium and science laboratories. The school eventually became a day school for boys and girls, and in 1987 the boarding school aspect left the building forever.

In 1988, RMC went under major reconstruction. A double gymnasium was added to the north end, at the end of the science wing, and the ARMO hall was renovated into the technology wing at the south end of the building. Five portable classrooms were placed outside, but a fire caused one of them to be removed in the late 1990s. The dorm rooms on the 2nd and 3rd floors were converted into classrooms, and the library was moved to the 2nd floor.

For 47 years, the school featured a large bell tower in the front of the school, which displayed a cross which was illuminated nightly. A piece of the tower fell off in November 2010, and the tower had to be taken down for safety concerns. By March 1, 2011, the tower had been completely dismantled, and the cross was replaced atop the roof of the Central Section of the Main Building.

The sewage plant was closed down in 2009 and converted to a maintenance groundskeeping facility. The school was converted from well water to municipal water in 2010.

In modern times, the original building had a four-level main building, outdoor sports fields, a dance studio, a gymnasium, library, weight room, and more facilities.

In 2015, the school board was granted $19.2 million to replace Regina Mundi Catholic College. However, no work was done to replace the school due to inflation and high demolition costs. In October 2023, the Ministry of Education granted $51.6 million to replace the school. The new $54.3 million facility is located beside the original RMC. Construction began in early 2024 and was completed by 2026. The original facility was kept open due to high enrollment.

RMC is situated on 50 acres of land, bounded by Wellington Road to the west, the London District Catholic School Board education centre to the north, a pond and forest to the east, and Scotland Drive about 500 metres to the south.

=== Chapel ===
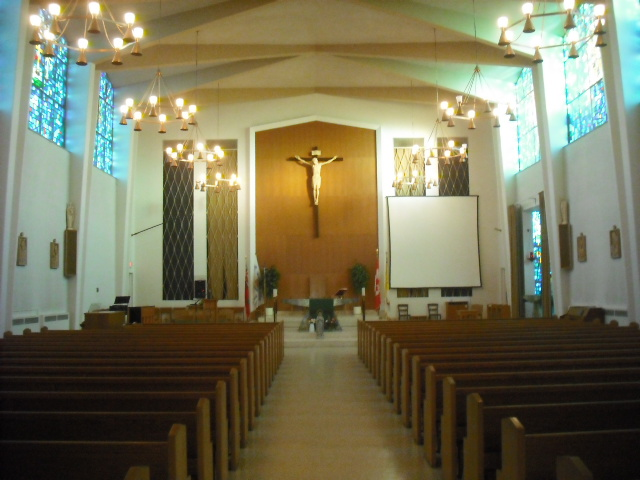
Chapel at RMC (notice the curtains covering the organ pipes).

The chapel at the original Regina Mundi is located on the first floor of the Central Section, and is visible as soon as one walks into the main entrance of the building. The chapel is the largest of all Catholic Secondary Schools in the LDCSB, owing to the history of the school as a Junior Seminary.

The chapel is built of stone on the exterior, as is the rest of the school, and has a wood finish inside. The altar is made of granite stone. Along the entire chapel are stained glass windows, and images featuring the Stations of the Cross. To either side of the cross are long fabric drapes displaying the school's colours of blue and gold. Behind those drapes are the pipes for the school's $200,000 organ.

There are two rooms on either side of the rear of the chapel. When the school was first built, the two rooms behind the chapel were used by the priests as living quarters, but now they are the headquarters for the school's active Chaplaincy Team.

The chapel also features the Memory Wall, which has pictures of all the students and staff who have died during their terms at RMC.

== Feeder schools ==
- Holy Rosary Catholic School
- Sir Arthur Carty Catholic School
- St. David's Catholic School
- St. Francis Catholic School
- St. Sebastian Catholic School
- St. Anthony Catholic French Immersion School

== Notable alumni ==
- Jennifer Hedger, TSN announcer
- Jason Williams, NHL player
- Jason de Vos, Soccer player
- Steve Patterson, comedian
- Ingrid Kavelaars, actress
- Monique Kavelaars, Fencer and Olympian
- Brandon Prust, NHL player
- Kiefer Sutherland, actor (24, The Lost Boys, Stand by Me); one semester only; not an alumnus
- Sarah Lafleur, actress
- Barrie Moore, NHL player
- David Brown, CFL player

== See also ==
- Education in Ontario
- List of secondary schools in Ontario
