= Argyle, London, Ontario =

Argyle
- Neighbourhood
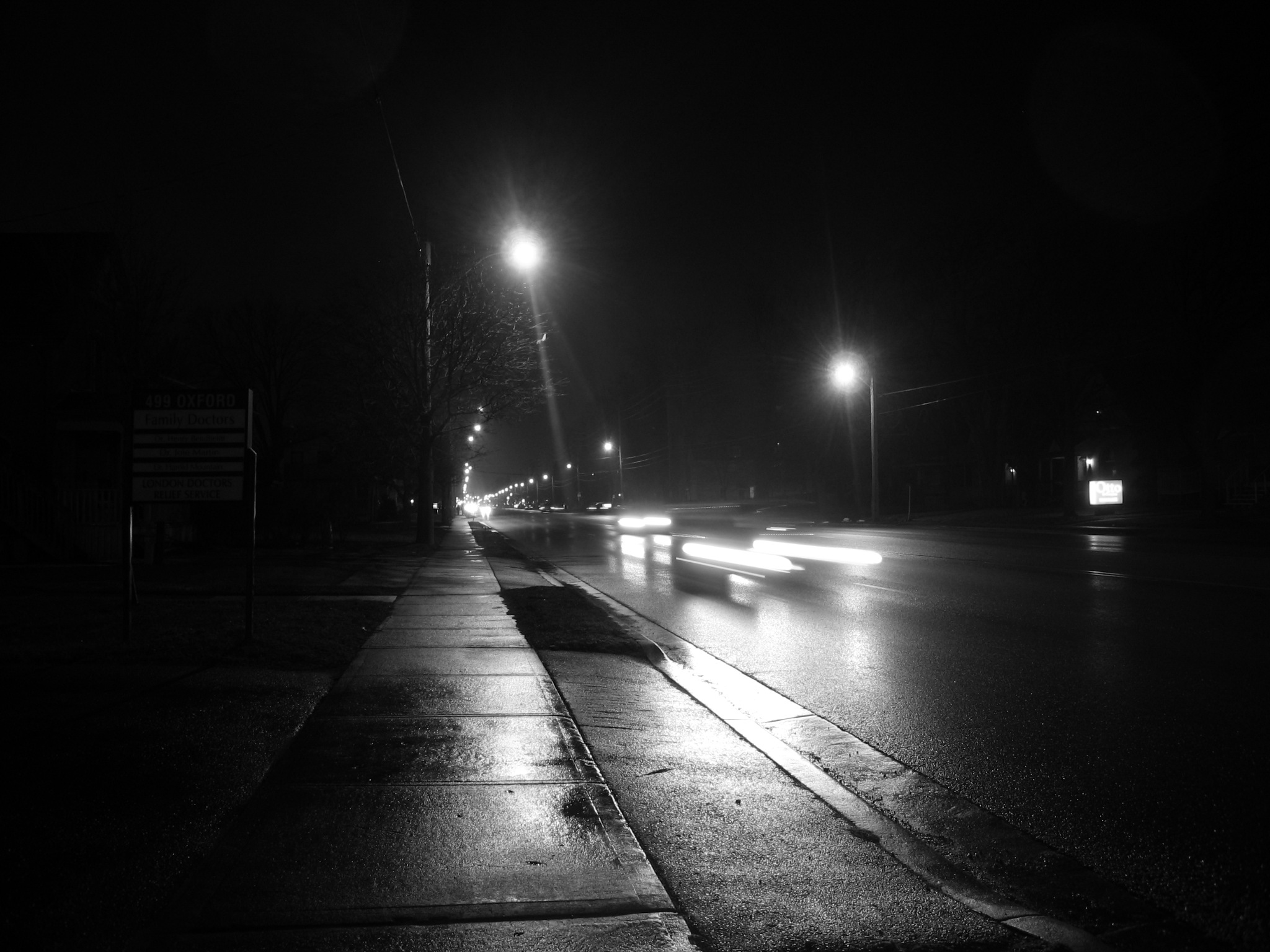
- Oxford Street

- Location in Ontario
- Coordinates: 43°02′16″N 81°17′07″W
- Country: Canada
- Province: Ontario
- City: London

Government
  - MP: Kurt Holman (London—Fanshawe)
  - MPP: Teresa Armstrong (London—Fanshawe)
  - Councillor: Shawn Lewis (Ward 2)

Population (2021)
  - Total: 27,385
- Time zone: UTC-5 (Eastern Time Zone)
  - Summer (DST): UTC-6 (Eastern Time Zone)
- Postal Code: N5V, N5W
- Area codes: 519, 226

Argyle is a neighbourhood in the city of London, Ontario, Canada. Located in the eastern part of the city, the area includes several neighbourhoods such as Pottersburg, Nelson Park, and Trafalgar Heights.

== History ==
Argyle was founded in the 1800s. The Brothers Pottery Co. was a major employer, but it caught fire in 1912. Pottersburg was annexed by the city of London in 1912. The neighbourhood grew after World War 2, when most residential construction began. The majority of Argyle's residents live in single detached homes, townhouses, and three-story walk-ups. Dundas Street is the largest commercial hub in the area. Argyle Mall is a major shopping centre in the area, housing retailers such as Winners and Walmart.

For recreation, Argyle has a London Public Library branch and houses the East Lions Community Centre. It is also a hub for the London Transit Commission. Parks in the area include Nelson Park, East Lions Park, and Kiwanis Park. The neighbourhood is known for hosting the yearly Argyle Santa Claus Parade, organized by the local Argyle Business Improvement Area. Argyle is located near Fanshawe College.

With a population of 27,385 as per the 2021 Canadian Census, Argyle has an almost even divide between men and women. Most of its population is between the ages of 15 and 64 years old. The neighbourhood has a large and growing South Asian immigrant population.

== Government and politics ==
Federally, Argyle has been represented by the southeastern riding of London—Fanshawe. A longtime New Democratic Party stronghold, the Conservative Party's Kurt Holman gained the seat in the 2025 Canadian federal election.

Provincially, Argyle has been represented by the southeastern riding of London—Fanshawe. A longtime Ontario New Democratic Party stronghold, the riding has been represented by the NDP's Teresa Armstrong since the 2011 Ontario general election.

Municipally, Argyle has been represented by Shawn Lewis at London City Council since the 2018 London, Ontario, municipal election.

== Education ==
The neighbourhood is home to multiple elementary and secondary schools, including:

- St. Pius X Catholic School (London District Catholic School Board)
- Bonaventure Meadows Public School (Thames Valley District School Board)
- Prince Charles Public School (Thames Valley District School Board)
- Lord Nelson Public School (Thames Valley District School Board)
- London Christian Elementary School (London District Catholic School Board)
- Clarke Road Secondary School (Thames Valley District School Board)
- Holy Family Catholic School (London District Catholic School Board)
