= John Paul II Catholic Secondary School =

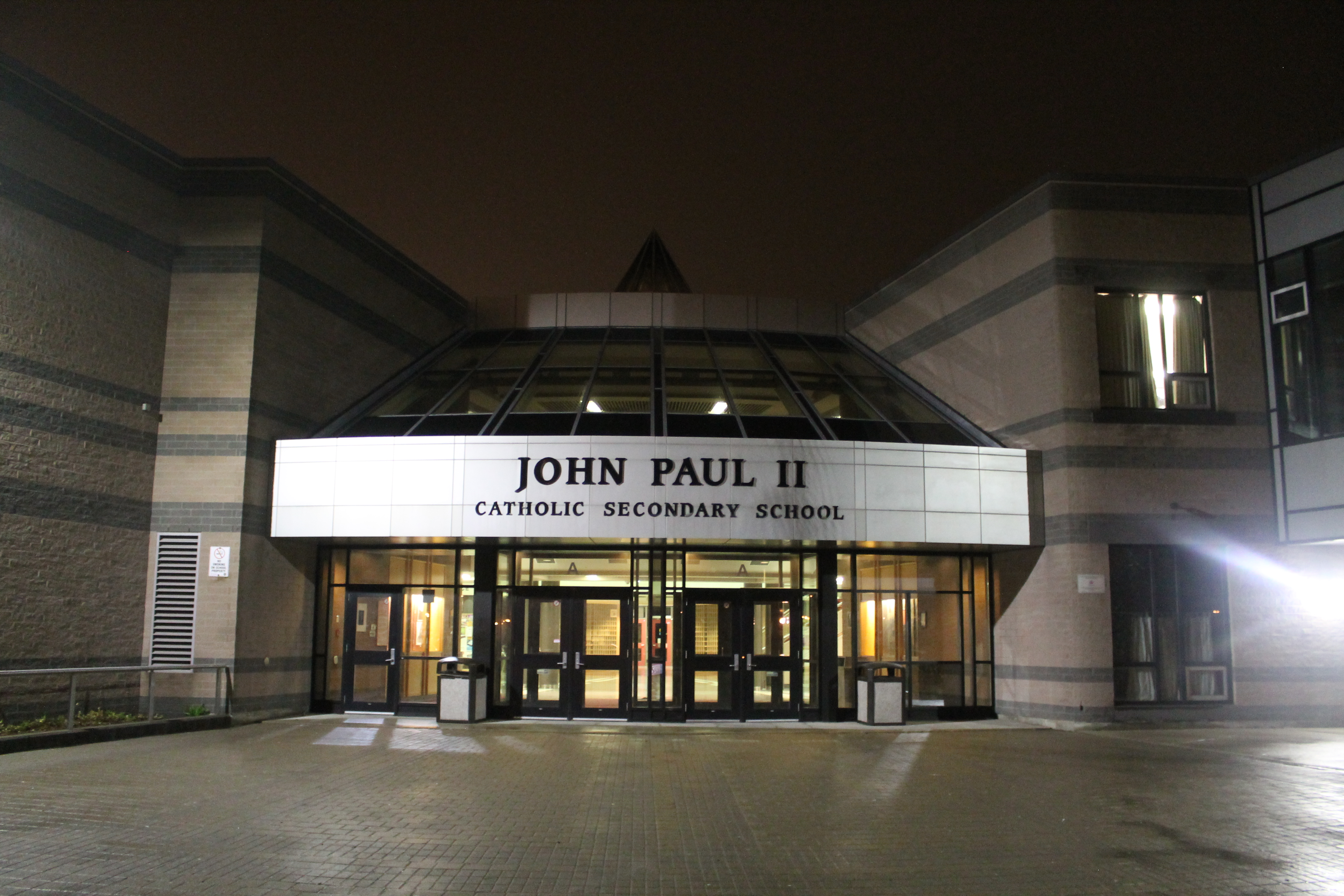
- View at night

Location
- 1300 Oxford Street East; London, Ontario, N5V 4P7; Canada; 43.0105°N 81.20839°W

Information
- Other names: Jp2, JPII, John Paul
- Type: Catholic High School
- Motto: Maturare In Dignitatem (Mature in Dignity)
- Religious affiliation: Roman Catholic
- Founded: 1985 (1991 current location)
- School board: London District Catholic School Board
- Principal: Rick Sheardown
- Grades: 9-12 (Grade 13 is an option for students)
- Enrollment: 775 (September 2021)
- Language: English
- Hours in school day: 8:00 AM - 2:05 PM
- Area: Huron Heights
- Colours: Maroon, beige, white and Black
- Slogan: "Matuare in Dignitatem"
- Athletics: Basketball, pickleball, Volleyball, Dance, Track and Field, Soccer, Hockey, Cross Country, Caseball, Golf, and Badminton
- Mascot: Jaguar
- Team name: JP2 Jaguars (Jags)
- Website: jp2.ldcsb.ca
- Last updated: December 20, 2022

John Paul II Catholic Secondary School, often referred to as JPII, John Paul, or Jp; is a secondary school in London, Ontario. It is administered by the London District Catholic School Board. It is located at 1300 Oxford Street East, at the northeast corner of Oxford and Highbury Avenue, next to Fanshawe College and Robarts School for the Deaf.

This school was named after Pope John Paul II. The school houses a "cafetorium", which is a fusion between a cafeteria and an auditorium. It has a cafeteria area with a stage that houses extra seating underneath.

== History ==
Originally opened on September 2, 1985 in the former St. Lawrence Elementary School at 920 Huron St. The current building at Oxford and Highbury was opened in 1991.

The school has an extremely low drop-out rate (less than 2%) and the majority of John Paul II graduates go on to college and university.

The school received national attention as it became the first fully carbon-neutral school in Canada in November 2021. The project was unveiled in 2019 and received $4.8 million CAD from Natural Resources Canada (NRCan), and was built and managed by Ameresco. The process involved installing solar panels on the roof and above the parking lots, a geothermal exchange system, and Tesla batteries.

== See also ==
- Education in Ontario
- List of secondary schools in Ontario
