= St. Joseph's High School (St. Thomas, Ontario) =

St. Joseph's Catholic High School
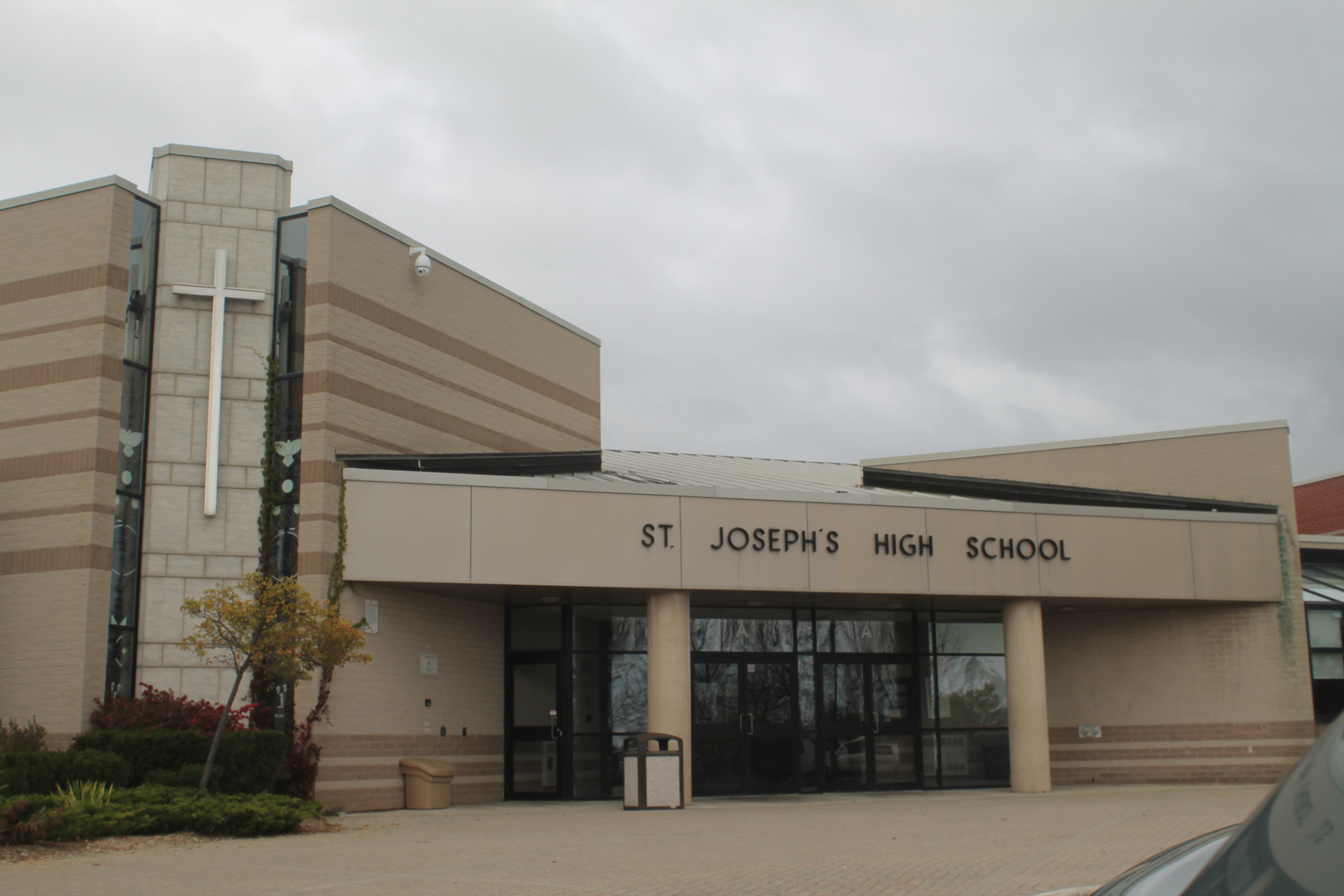

Location
- 100 Bill Martyn Parkway, Rural Route #4; St. Thomas, Ontario, N5R 6A7; Canada; 42.75463°N 81.16935°W

Information
- School type: Catholic High School
- Founded: 1925 (Current Building 1994)
- School board: London District Catholic School Board
- Principal: James Sefeldas
- Grades: 9-12
- Enrollment: 825 (September 2021)
- Language: English
- Area: St. Thomas & County
- Colours: Blue, Gold
- Mascot: Ram Man
- Team name: The Rams
- Website: sjh.ldcsb.ca
- Last updated: August 15, 2017

St. Joseph's High School ("St. Joe's") is a Catholic secondary school situated in St. Thomas, Ontario, Canada and administered under the London District Catholic School Board. The school has had a recent expansion, and also shares the building with Fanshawe College.

== History ==
In September 1925, a new addition was built onto Holy Angel's Elementary School consisting of two classrooms, a chemistry laboratory in the basement, a Board Room and a library. Sister Fideles Fortune was appointed as principal and St. Joseph's High School was born.

In September 1929, Sister Grace Gleeson became the new principal and in order to accommodate a growing enrolment was aided by Sister St. Catherine. Embracing the age of modern technology, a manual typewriter was purchased by the Board exclusively for school use but residing in the convent.

The girls of St. Joseph's wore a blue and white uniform that remained the standard of school fashion until 1970, when it was replaced by a plaid kilt with brown blazer. The school crest and blue and gold colours were established at this time and remain a tradition to this day.

Father Remi Durand introduced boys' basketball and softball in 1929, and the St. Joseph's Saints were born. This would begin a long history of athletic success at St. Joe's.

During the 1930s and '40s St. Joseph's stayed abreast with administrative and curriculum changes initiated by the Ontario Department of Education, such as adding grade 13 to the curriculum. This expansion of the school program allowed students to graduate directly to University from the Parish school system. For those students who were entering the world of business after high school, a Special Commercial program was also added to the curriculum at this time.

World War II called thousands of Canadians to service including many from St. Thomas. Hugh Cassidy, Walter McManus and Donald Udell, students of St. Joseph's, sacrificed their lives in the service of their country and are remembered by generations of students to this day.

Car pools and buses brought students to St. Joseph's from Port Stanley, Rodney, Shedden, Sparta, Wallacetown, Glanworth, West Lorne, Aylmer and Tillsonburg during the 1940s and '50s. In order to meet this growth in enrolment, two new classrooms were added particularly for grade eleven and twelve students. In 1953, a new gymnasium was added, providing an alternative to the use of outside facilities at the YMCA and St. Thomas Collegiate. The girls' basketball teams won consecutive WOSSA basketball championships and the boys' football team contended in the WOSSA final. Students performed in musicals and operettas. School functions were often followed by informal gatherings at the White Palace or Gettas Restaurant. In 1955, a new science lab, principal's office; library and two additional classrooms were added to the school building.

Significant to the growth of St. Joe's sporting tradition was the addition of Tommy White to the school staff in 1956. White was a renowned local and semi-professional baseball player and manager, intercollegiate basketball referee, and basketball player. He was known locally as owner of Tommy White's Sport Shop, a sporting goods outlet. Items purchased from the establishment retained White's distinctive cigars long after their purchase and use. Tommy White served as coach for basketball, football, volleyball, soccer and golf for over 24 years. Despite a fiery competitive spirit, White endeavoured to provide all interested young athletes with an opportunity to participate. White's memorial plaque adorns the entrance to the St. Joe's gymnasium, which has been named in his honour.

In September 1965, it became necessary to introduce tuition fees to help cover the rising cost of modern education. Fees continued to be charged until the completion of Catholic Education in 1986. Throughout the history of St. Joseph's, fundraising activities provided necessary support to the school. Spaghetti dinners, Bingo, rummage sales, days of apple picking, and other events provided necessary funding to the school. During the 1970s and 1980s, the Catholic community contributed financial assistance for renovations at the school. The Knights of Columbus, Catholic Women's League, St. Anne's Festival Board, St. Joseph's Board of Governors, and the Friends of St. Joseph's have made contributions to sustaining the viability of the school.

St. Joseph's continued to offer a co-curricular program in the era following the extension of full funding. While the school population in the classrooms grew beyond the capacity of the White St. school building, a dynasty emerged in girls' basketball. The St. Joe's senior girls were provincial champions in 1986, '87, '88, '91, '92, '93, and '95 and finalists in 1996 and '98. The senior boys' teams were provincial champions in 1994 and 1998 and finalists in 1995 and '96.

The impact of full funding was realized on May 4, 1990, when the Ministry of Education announced the allocation of $7,036,000 to build Phase I of the New St. Joseph's Catholic High School. On February 4, 1994, the new school was opened to welcome five hundred students. The new school building provided students with an expanded academic and co-instructional program including Instrumental and Vocal Music, Drama, Physical Education and Fitness, Environmental Science and Technological Studies. The school was designed with a particular focus on environmental science and that continues to be an emphasis at the school to the present. With access to a sports field, St. Joseph's instituted a football program in 1997. Starting with a junior program in the first year and adding a senior in the second, the St. Joe's Rams have quickly become competitive in the local football conference and the football program has provided a focus for school spirit at the beginning of the school year.

St. Joseph's continues to enjoy the support of the Elgin County community as reflected in the growing enrolment. In 2002, some 640 students were enrolled and nine portable classrooms have been added to the site over the past few years. Plans for a reorganization of the technology area have been proposed and have received support in principle from the London District Catholic School Board. However, in 2008, the student body population reached a nearly 900 students that daily try to fit themselves in the school built for 500 students.

The Rams football team won the TVRAA South-East football championship five years in a row following a loss in the league finals in 2003.

== Past drama productions ==
In recent years, St. Joseph's Catholic High school has premiered Broadway's The Cursed Child; High School edition in 2025, Clue in 2024, and Seussical in 2023.

== See also ==
- Education in Ontario
- List of secondary schools in Ontario
