= Rapid Transit (London, Ontario) =

Bus rapid transit system in Ontario, Canada

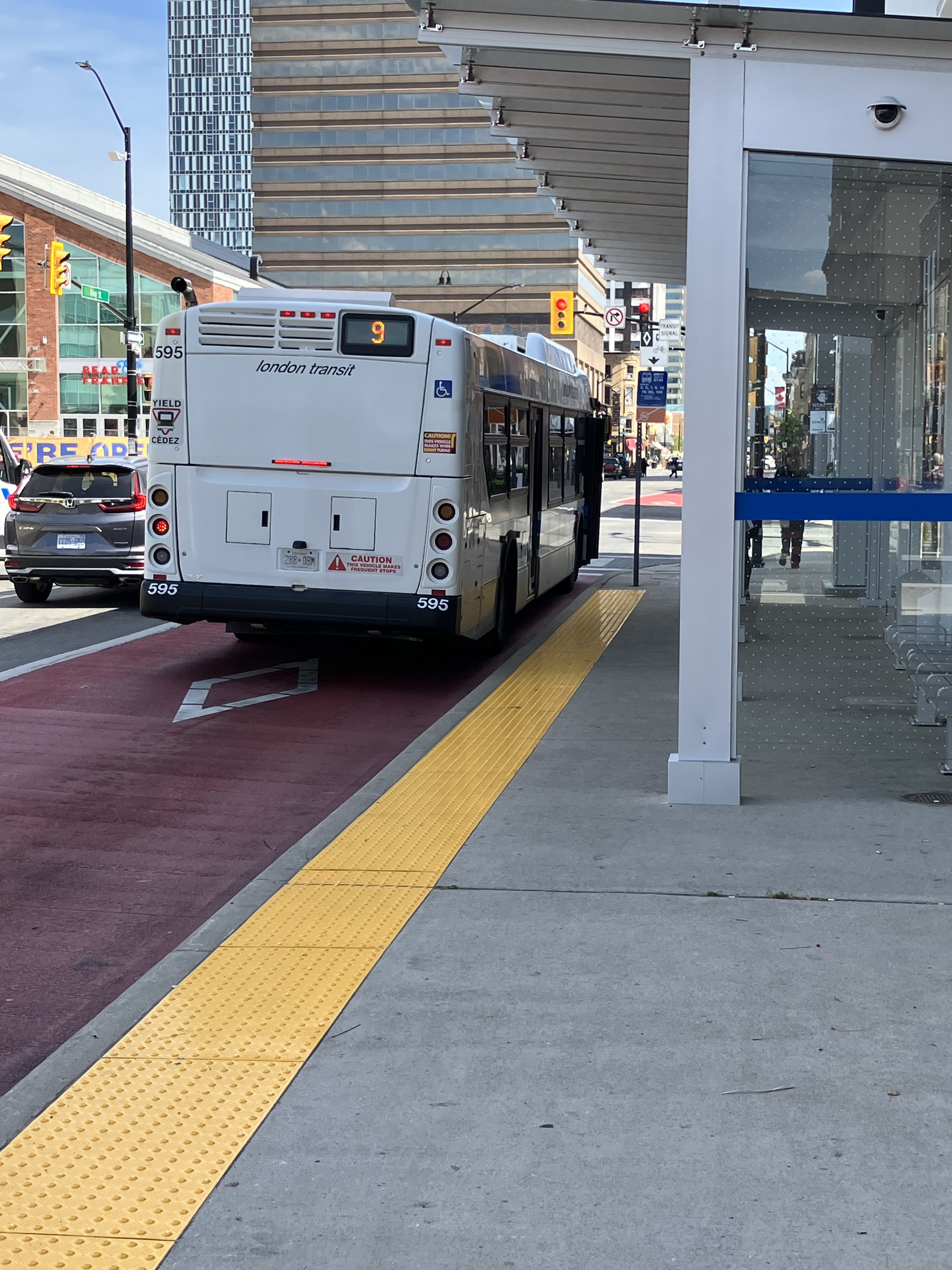
- A bus station at King and Talbot on a bus lane

Overview
- Operator: London Transit Commission
- Vehicle: XD40, XD60
- Status: Under construction
- Began service: Late-2027 (East London Link); 2029 (Wellington gateway); 2030? (full)

Route
- Route type: Bus rapid transit
- Locale: London, Ontario
- Communities served: 8
- Landmarks served: Canada Life Place, Fanshawe College, White Oaks Mall, London Police Service, H. B. Beal Secondary School, Middlesex County Courthouse, Victoria Hospital
- Length: 15.8 km (9.8 mi)
- Stops: 23
- Other routes: TBA

Service
- Frequency: TBD
- Map: london.ca/rapidtransit

Rapid Transit, formerly known as Shift, is a bus rapid transit (BRT) network under construction in London, Ontario, consisting of two corridors that converge at a central downtown hub. The project aims to improve traffic flow, enhance streetscapes, and replace aging underground infrastructure. On January 15, 2018, the Ontario government allocated C$170M in funding for the initiative, with total project costs reaching approximately C$454M, including contributions from both federal and provincial governments.

The rapid transit system features dedicated bus lanes, including curbside and centre-running lanes, and transit priority signals for smoother operations. Enhanced stations are being designed to accommodate large passenger loads, with seating areas, route information, security cameras, and tempered glass for safety and comfort. The project also includes the installation of new streetscape elements and urban design improvements, which will help ease traffic flow and improve the overall public transit experience in London.

As of August 2026, the East London Link is scheduled for completion in the fall of 2027, with operations expected to begin then as well. The route will run between downtown and Fanshawe College. Similarly, the Wellington Gateway project is expected to be completed in 2028, with service slated to begin in 2029 for the segment between downtown and White Oaks Mall.

== History ==
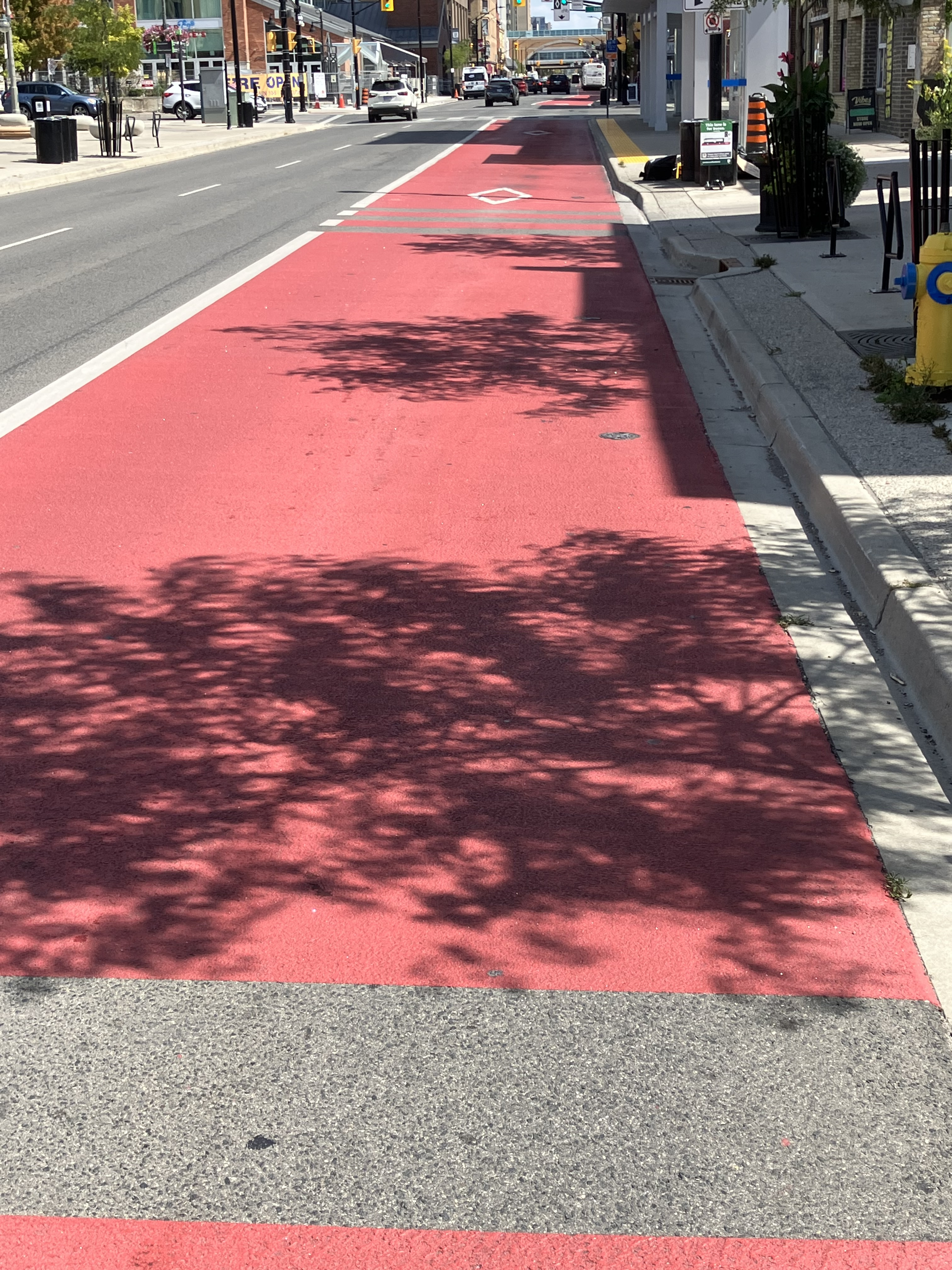
Bus Rapid transit Lane along King Street

The City of London updated its Transportation Master Plan in May 2013, providing a strategy for transportation and land use decisions to 2030 and beyond. One of the targets of the plan was to increase transportation mode share in the city from 12.5% walk/cycle/transit usage to 20% by 2030, and it was determined that the implementation of a rapid transit network would achieve that goal. Initially, the proposed network consisted of an east-west corridor and a north-south corridor, both of which would meet in the downtown core. The city then initiated formal planning for the rapid transit project in September 2014, and branded it as "Shift" in January 2015. By November 2015, the corridors were changed to north-east and south-west orientations. Initially, the city had voted to advance a light rail transit (LRT) line along the north-east corridor, including a 900-metre (3,000 ft) underground segment along Richmond Street near the downtown core, and a BRT line along the south-west corridor, anticipated to cost C$880M at full build-out, known as the "hybrid system", aiming to emulate Waterloo Region in its development of the iON LRT. A business case, completed by IBI Group in May 2016, reaffirmed the viability of the hybrid system. Later in 2016, it was announced that city staff had decided to drop the LRT portion of the system entirely, focusing on a full BRT system at a reduced cost of C$500M. With these considerable changes, the Shift project eventually became known as Rapid Transit. In 2019, city councillors voted down the north and west BRT legs in close votes, originally anticipated to cost C$147M and C$72M, respectively. This effectively cut the proposed network in half, and ultimately only aimed to service the south and east areas of the city, despite the north and western areas of the city being the fastest-growing. The anticipated cost of construction for the approved portions of the network was estimated at a total of C$281M.

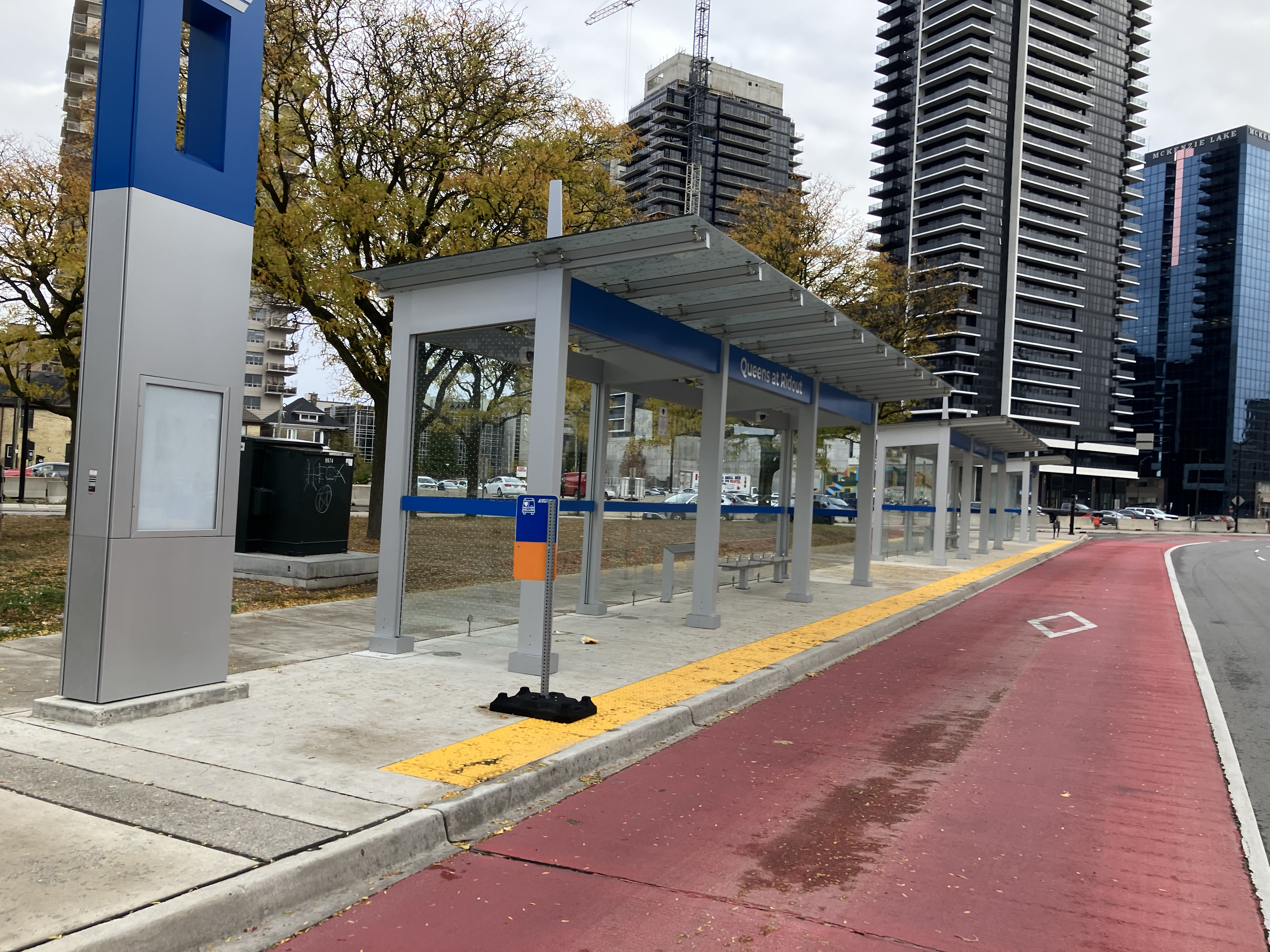
Queens at Ridout Station on the downtown loop

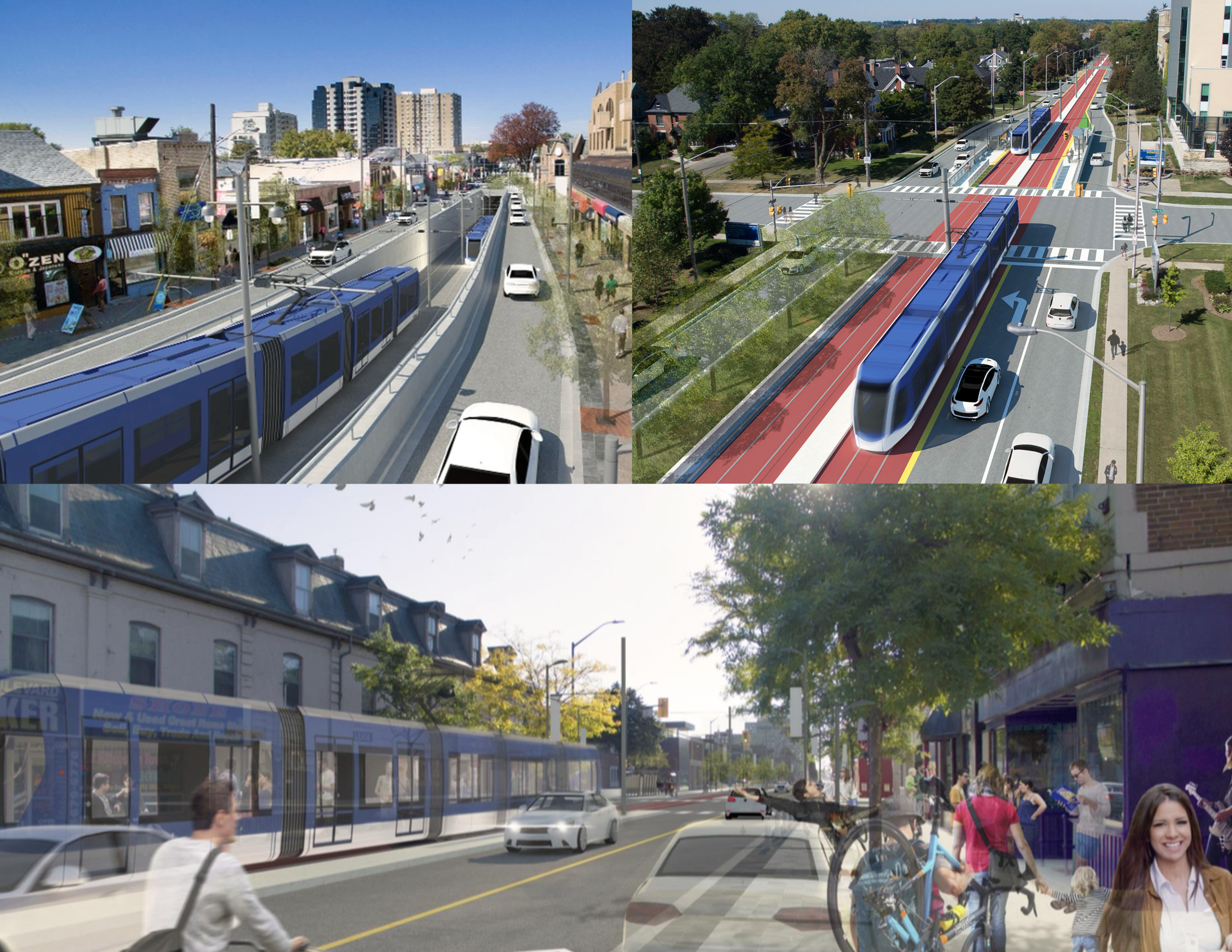
Renderings of cancelled London LRT system option

Construction of the network was initiated in 2020. The network was split into three phases; the Downtown Loop, Wellington Gateway (south leg), and Eastern Link (east leg). The Downtown Loop started construction in 2020, and was fully completed in 2024. The Eastern Link started construction in 2022, with completion anticipated in 2026. The Wellington Gateway started construction in 2023, with completion anticipated in 2028. It was reported in 2023 that the anticipated costs for the network had jumped to approximately C$454M, representing a 50% cost increase. In July 2025, the city of London released its Mobility Master Plan, which identifies transportation priorities to 2050. The plan superseded the previous Transportation Master Plan, and was created as a result of high regional population growth and the early achievement of the mode share goals targeted in the previous plan. The plan identified additional future corridors for the Rapid Transit network, including a reinstated north BRT leg to the Masonville neighbourhood utilizing a route along Wharncliffe and Western Roads, a reinstated west BRT leg to the intersection of Oxford Street and Wonderland Road, a new BRT corridor running along Oxford Street connecting the east and west legs, and a new north-south BRT corridor along Wonderland Road, running from Fanshawe Park Road to Southdale Road. It was reported in January 2026 that the north BRT leg would be receiving funding priority.

In March 2026, a rehabilitation project commenced on the Queen’s Bridge, a one-way westbound bridge located west of downtown crossing the Thames River. The bridge is being widened and reconfigured to add eastbound and westbound transit lanes. This rehabilitation is considered an enabling project for the west and north BRT legs, which would connect to the downtown loop via the bridge along Riverside Drive and Queen’s Avenue. Construction is anticipated to last until May 2027.

== Network ==
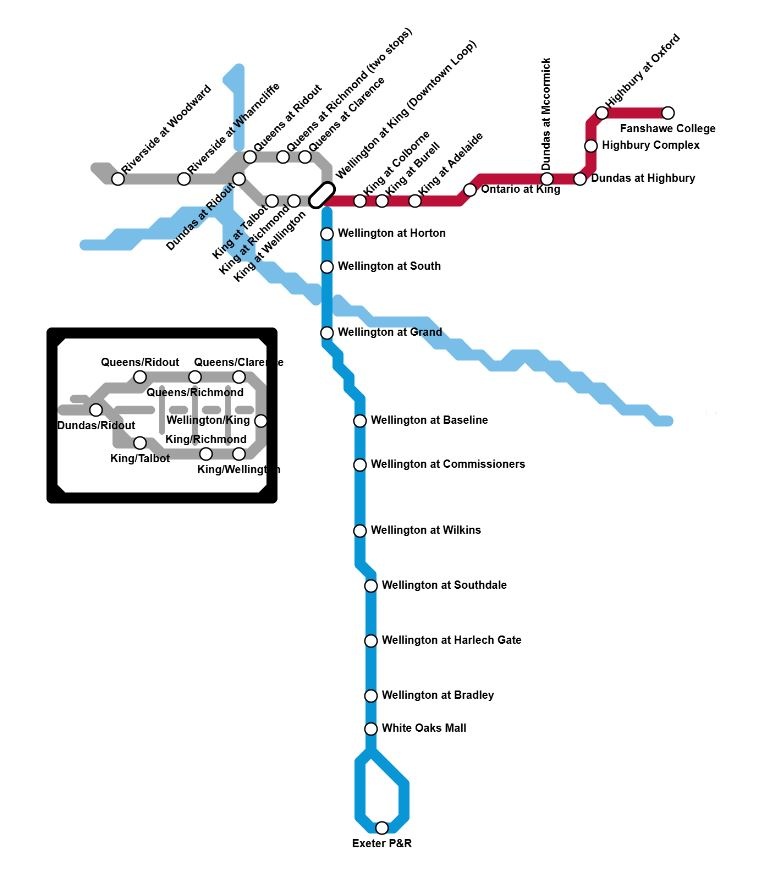
Rapid Transit network in London, Ontario (including Downtown Loop)

Overall, the network's route will be 15.8 km (9.8 miles) in length, with a total of 23 stations. Stations will be spaced approximately 600 to 800 metres (2,000 to 2,600 ft) apart. The network is planned to consist of three segments upon full build-out; the Downtown Loop, Eastern Link, and Wellington Gateway.

Line	Opening Date	Terminus		# of stops
Downtown Loop	Construction Completed 2024. Service early 2025 (local buses)	N/A		4
Eastern Link	Under Construction. Completion Anticipated 2026. Service TBA	Wellington Street	Fanshawe College	9
Wellington Gateway	Under Construction. Completion Anticipated 2028. Service limited (express bus)	King Street	Exeter Road	11

== Future ==
Multiple extensions of the network are already being planned, as of 2026.

=== North BRT Corridor ===
The 2050 Mobility Master Plan identifies a reinstatement of the North BRT portion of the network. This corridor would connect to the Downtown Loop along Queens Avenue, moving westward along Riverside Drive, running north along Wharncliffe Road, and continuing north along Western Road and Richmond Street, terminating at the intersection of Richmond Street and Fanshawe Park Road near CF Masonville Place. This route is classified as "near-term" to be implemented by 2035.

=== West BRT Corridor ===
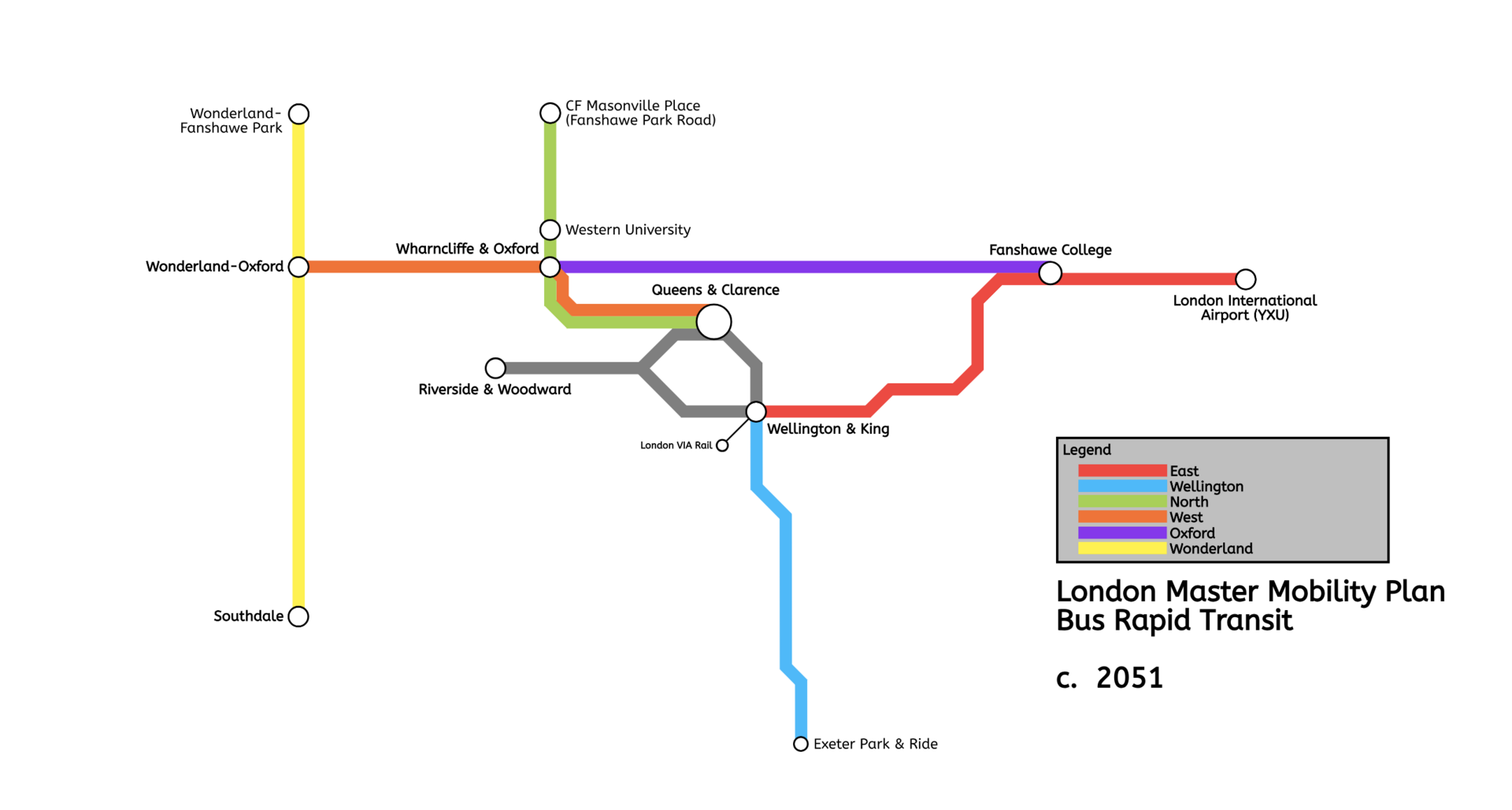
LTC's master plan for buses in 2050.

The 2050 Mobility Master Plan identifies a reinstatement of the West BRT portion of the network. This corridor would share the same route as the North BRT corridor up until the intersection of Wharncliffe Road and Oxford Street, where the corridor would run west along Oxford to the intersection with Wonderland Road. This route is classified as "near-term" to be implemented by 2035. Additionally, in 2024, London's Deputy Mayor Shawn Lewis indicated that a future extension of a potential West BRT Corridor to the intersection of Oxford Street and Westdel Bourne might be suitable. This route did not appear on the 2050 Mobility Master Plan.

=== Oxford BRT Corridor ===
The 2050 Mobility Master Plan identifies a new corridor that would connect the Eastern Link with the West BRT Corridor along Oxford Street. This route is classified as "medium-term" to be implemented by 2045.

=== Wonderland BRT Corridor ===
The 2050 Mobility Master Plan identifies a new north-south corridor along Wonderland Road, running from Fanshawe Park Road to Southdale Road. This route is classified as "long-term" to be implemented by 2050. This route is being envisioned as a replacement for the proposed six-laning of Wonderland Road.

=== London International Airport BRT Extension ===
In 2024, London's Deputy Mayor Shawn Lewis indicated that a future extension of the Eastern Link to London International Airport (YXU) might be suitable. This route did not appear on the 2050 Mobility Master Plan.
