= St. Mary's Catholic High School (Woodstock, Ontario) =

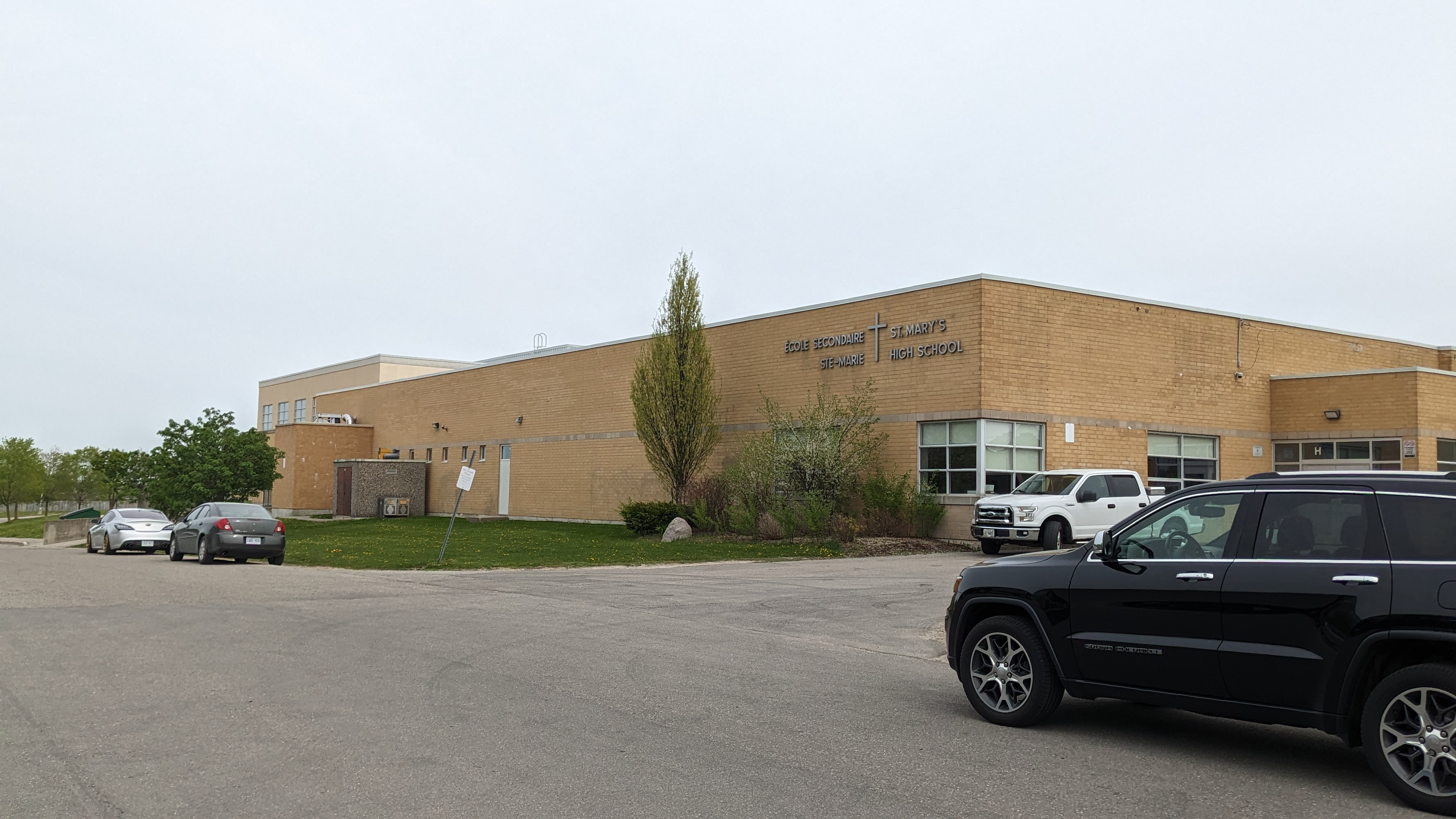

Location
- 431 Juliana Drive; Woodstock, Ontario, N4V 1E8; Canada; 43.11308°N 80.74973°W

Information
- School type: High school
- Motto: Christo Unitas ("One In Christ")
- Religious affiliation: Roman Catholic
- School board: London District Catholic School Board
- School number: 4284
- Principal: Tony Dora
- Grades: 9-12
- Enrollment: 575 (September 2021)
- Colours: Navy Blue, Powder Blue, Black, White
- Mascot: Maximus the Warrior
- Team name: The Warriors
- Website: smh.ldcsb.ca

St. Mary's Catholic High School is a Catholic high school located in Woodstock, Ontario, Canada under the administration of the London District Catholic School Board.

== History ==
The origin of St. Mary's Catholic School began as a dream of ten Catholic families who formed the members of the St. Mary's Separate School Board in 1900. By 1901, the first stage of a two-classroom elementary school was built. Remodelling was done in 1913 to provide for two more classrooms to accommodate the growing enrolment of 113 students. However, by 1953 enrolment had grown to 162, and the first formal two-room addition was added in 1956. Two more rooms were added in 1958. In 1962, enrolment had grown to an overwhelming 317 and the purchase of portable classrooms became the norm.

Expanding Catholic education into the early years of secondary school was realized in 1981. St. Mary's Junior High School was founded and students were given the opportunity of continuing with Catholic education up to the end of Grade 10. With the passage of Bill 30 in 1984, full funding for Catholic education allowed for the extension of the junior high concept and St. Mary's Catholic High School was now a reality. The students entering Grade 9 in the 1984–85 school year began the pioneering work of becoming the first graduating class. In the fall of 1987, the first St. Mary's Catholic High School graduation was held with Bishop Sherlock presiding. The original graduating class consisted of 12 students who braved the new world of Catholic High School education and survived. By 1988, St. Mary's Catholic High School was now a full-fledged secondary school offering courses in Grades 9–12.

In 1997, St. Mary's Catholic High School enrolment of 500 plus had outgrown the school building on Oxford Street and the school moved to the current facility located on Juliana Drive. The momentous opening was officiated by Most Rev. John Sherlock, Bishop of London. Within one year of moving, the population had grown to 800 and a twelve classroom addition was built. The school's continued growth necessitated another addition of science labs, technology rooms and specialty rooms. In 2002, St. Mary's warriors boys soccer team won AA OFSAA gold held in Sturgeon Falls, Ontario.

== See also ==
- Education in Ontario
- List of secondary schools in Ontario
