= White Oaks Mall (London, Ontario) =

Coordinates: 42.9314°N 81.2246°W

- Location: 1105 Wellington Road; London, Ontario; N6E 1V4
- Opened: 1973
- Manager: Westdell Development Corp
- Owner: Westdell Development Corp.
- Num. of stores: 145
- Num. of anchor tenants: 2
- Floor area: 698,500 sq ft.
- Floors: 1
- Parking: 3,350
- Website: www.whiteoaksmall.ca

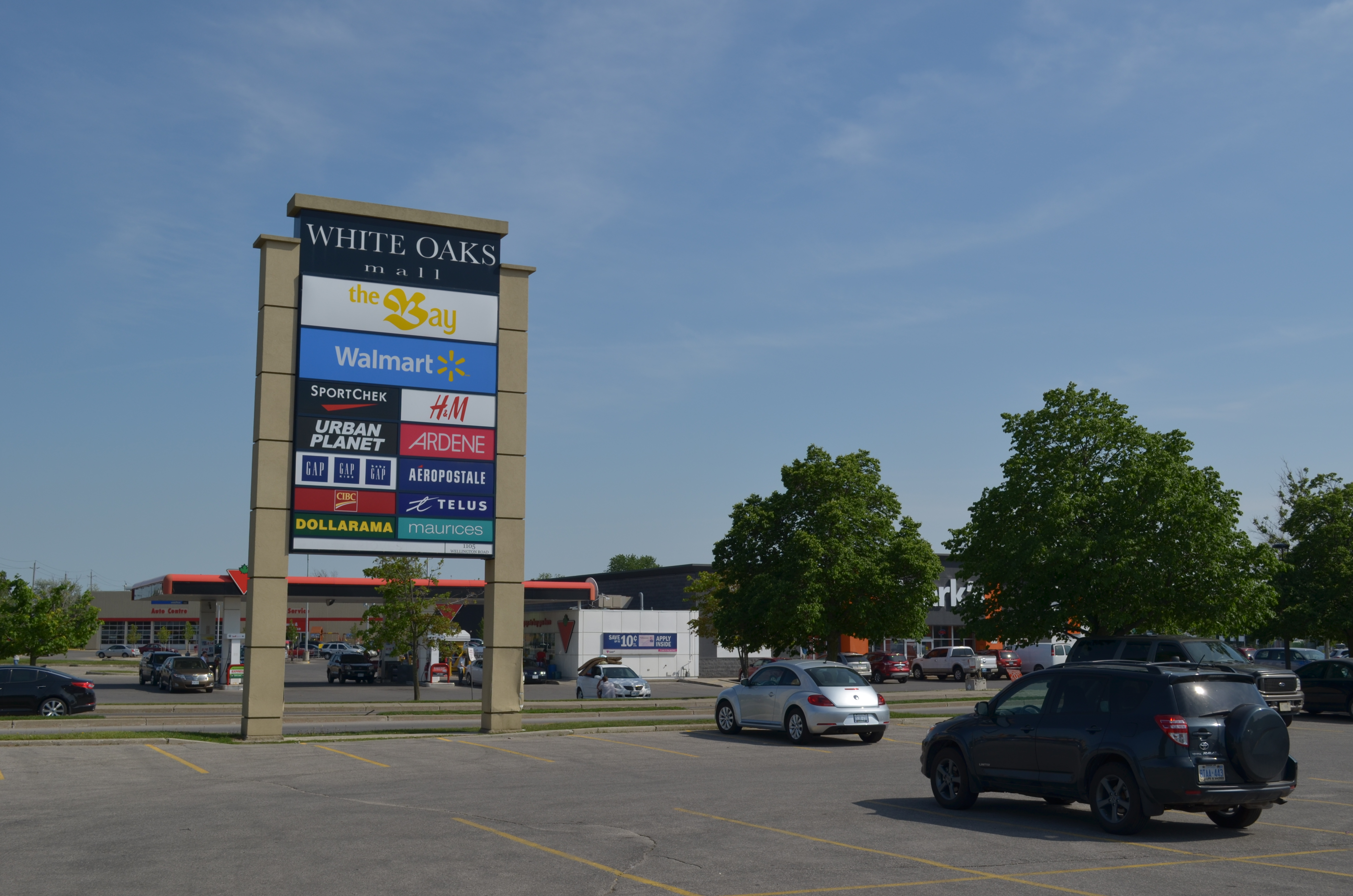
White Oaks Mall's parking lot, southeast entrance.

White Oaks Mall is a shopping centre in London, Ontario, Canada. It is located at the southwest corner of Wellington Road and Bradley Avenue, just north of Highway 401.

The store's current retailers include an IKEA, H&M, Urban Planet, Walmart, Designer Depot, Kitchen Stuff Plus, Shoppers Drug Mart, American Eagle Outfitters, Sport Check, and Bath & Body Works.

== Location ==
White Oaks is located in South London's White Oaks neighbourhood, adjacent to the arterial street Wellington Road. It is serviced by the following bus routes operated by the London Transit Commission, two terminals at Jalna Boulevard, which provide bus routes 4A, 4B and 93 and 4 terminals at the Wellington Road entrance, which give bus routes 10, 13, 13A, 28, 30, 90 and 95. The mall is expected to be the southern terminus of a one-way section of the planned London Rapid Transit system. It is also located near Fanshawe College's former London South Campus.

== History ==
=== Beginnings ===
The mall's property was originally occupied by a small outdoor plaza, built in 1962, before major development began in the surrounding neighbourhoods. In 1972, the plaza was completely rebuilt to make way for expansion. It became a fully enclosed shopping centre in 1973, anchored by Woolco and featuring 150+ stores.

=== Expansions ===
The mall's first major expansion in 1976 brought in a Simpson's department store after a major renovation to the old Sayvette. A long hall of stores that deviated west from the original race-track layout was also added. The mall saw rapid growth in the 1980s as it competed with other shopping centres in London. Over half a decade, the mall saw fewer than three major expansions. The first occurred in 1983 with a Marks and Spencer, a food court which replaced the Loblaws grocery store and several other new stores. A brand new wing began construction almost immediately after and opened in 1986. Over 50 more stores were added in 1988, which is the most recent major expansion. There was also a Woolco in the mall, which is now a Walmart.

=== Today ===
White Oaks saw a slight expansion in 2006, which brought in Swedish retailer H&M along with an Applebee's Neighborhood Grill and Bar (which later closed). In 2010, CPP Investment Board became the sole owner of the mall, until the property, along with two other regional malls, was acquired by Bentall Kennedy in 2013. During Bentall Kennedy's ownership, the mall saw a further renovation, including decorative pieces.

In recent years, the mall has received criticism for forcing out independent stores. For example, the gift shop Durga had been a mall tenant for 26 years. Similarly, Logo Sports was also denied a lease renewal in 2014 after 25 years at the mall and was later replaced by a competing franchise.

There are over 150 stores and services in the mall, which include a Dollarama, Sephora, Lush, Miniso, Roots, The Shoe Company, and a food court.

In 2022, it was announced that White Oaks Mall's concrete walls along the exterior would be removed and replaced with a modern look, with restaurants and patios along the new entrance. Westdell Development bought the mall in August 2023. New ownership has discussed the possibility of adding office space and apartments. Anchor store Hudson's Bay closed in 2025, which was partially replaced by a smaller IKEA concept store and football training/entertainment facility Footlab in 2026. IKEA had previously announced a London store in 2017, but shelved the proposal in 2020. In late September 2026, the IKEA concept store opened within the old Hudson's Bay space, as well as a new mall entrance. In October 2026, it was announced that two 30+ story residential towers, a Marriott Hotel, two outdoor retail units, a fitness club, and a Splitsville entertainment centre would be opening or begin contruction at the complex.

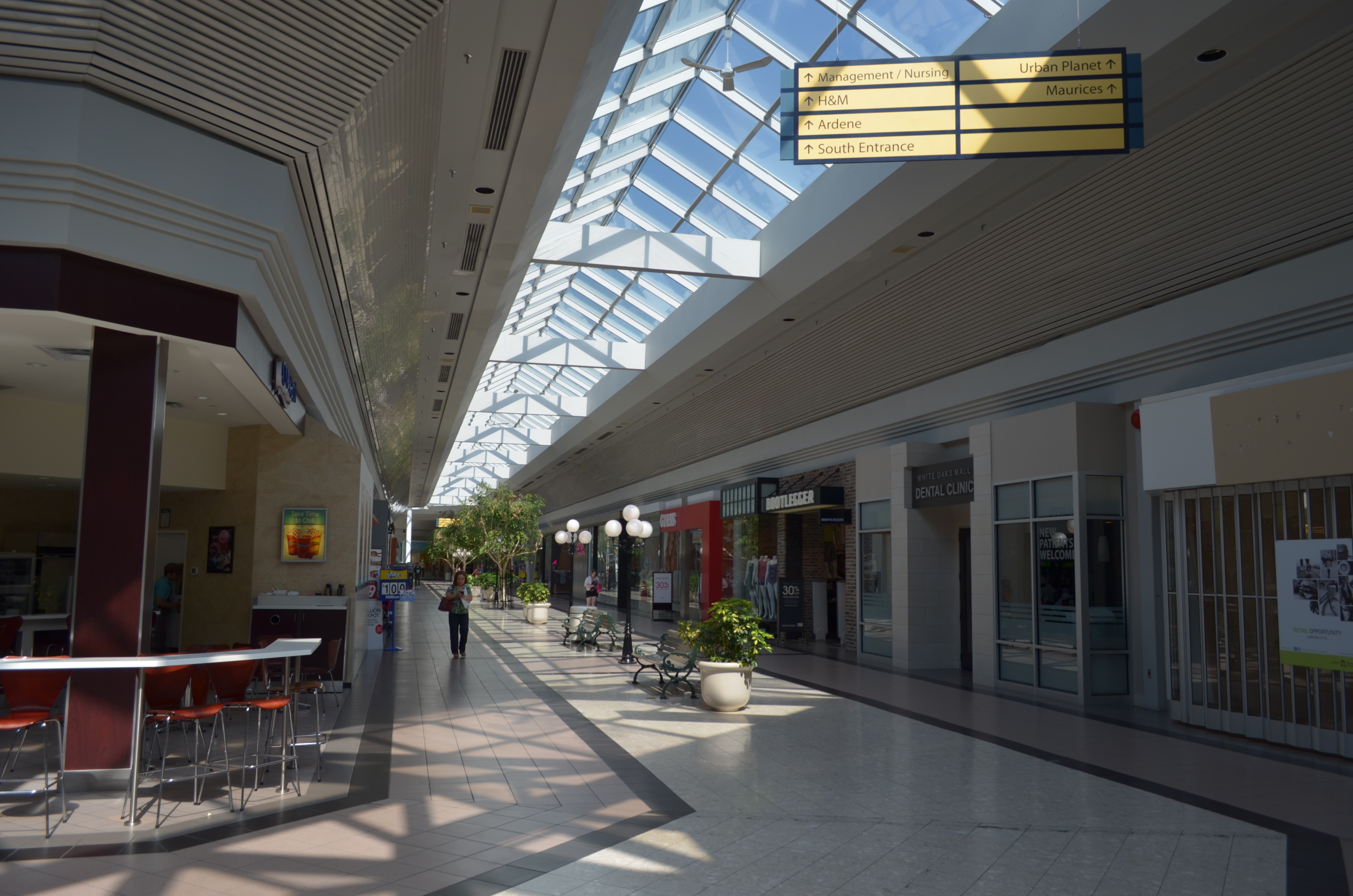
Shops in White Oaks Mall prior to renovations.

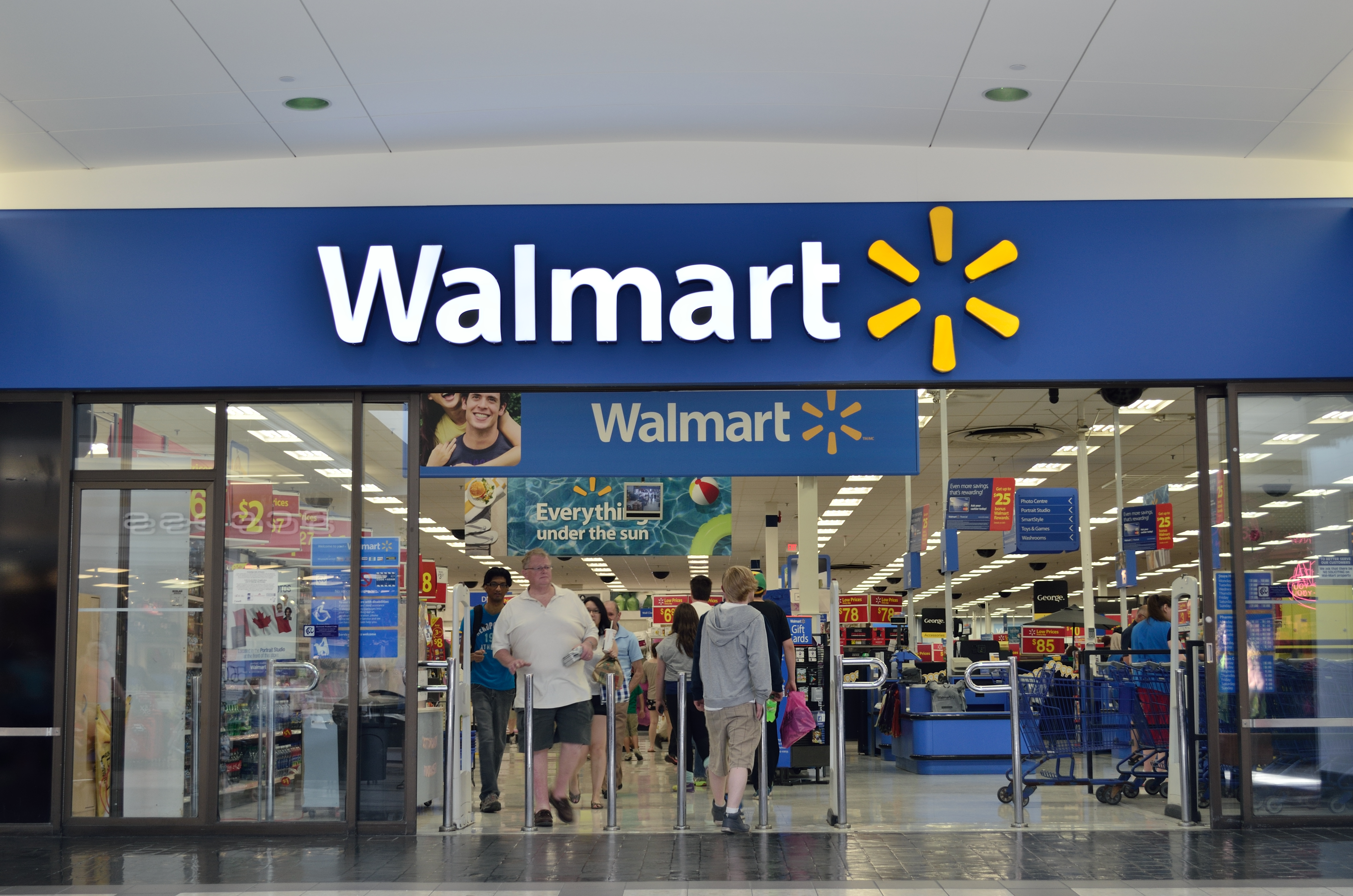
Walmart in White Oaks Mall, since converted to a Supercentre.

== See also ==
- List of largest enclosed shopping malls in Canada
