= Eric Atkinson (artist) =

British artist, 1928-2022

- Born: Eric Newton Atkinson; 23 July 1928; Hartlepool, County Durham, England
- Died: 14 July 2022 (aged 93); London, Ontario, Canada
- Education: Hartlepool College of Art; Royal Academy Schools
- Known for: Abstract landscape painting, art education

Eric Newton Atkinson (23 July 1928 – 14 July 2022) was a British-born Canadian painter and art educator. He was known for his abstract landscape paintings and for his contributions to art education in Britain and Canada. After teaching at Leeds College of Art, Atkinson emigrated to Canada in 1969, where he established the Fine Art programme at Fanshawe College in London, Ontario.

== Career ==
Atkinson was born in Hartlepool, England, in 1928. He studied at Hartlepool College of Art and the Royal Academy Schools in London. His first solo exhibition was held at the Irving Gallery in London in 1952.

Between 1955 and 1969, Atkinson taught at Leeds College of Art, ultimately serving as Head of Fine Art. He emigrated to Canada in 1969 to establish the Fine Art programme at Fanshawe College in London, Ontario. He served as Dean of Applied Arts from 1972 to 1982 and continued teaching at the college until his retirement in 1994.

Atkinson's artistic practice focused on abstract interpretations of landscape and natural processes. His paintings incorporated acrylic paint, graphite, sand and other materials to create textured surfaces marked by gestural and calligraphic forms. Atkinson exhibited widely in Britain and Canada, and his work is held in public collections including the Victoria and Albert Museum, Leeds Art Gallery, the Government Art Collection in the United Kingdom, Museum London and the McIntosh Gallery at Western University.

Atkinson died in 2022, aged 93.

== Select publications ==
- Lewis, David (2000). The Incomplete Circle. Eric Atkinson, Art and Education. Lund Humphries Publishers Ltd. ISBN 978-0-7546-0251-4.
- Holubizky, Ihor and David Lewis (2010). Drawings 1944-2010. Museum of London, Ontario. ISBN 978-1-897215-27-2.
- Frazer, Ted (2014). Eric Atkinson: journeys through the landscape. Beaverbrook Art Gallery. New Brunswick. ISBN 978-0-920674-75-8.
