= Jeff Willmore =

Canadian artist (born 1954)

- Picture of Jeff Willmore
- Born: Jeffrey John Willmore; December 23, 1954 (age 71); Toronto, Ontario, Canada
- Education: Fanshawe College
- Known for: Painter, graphic artist, storyteller

Jeffrey John Willmore (born December 23, 1954) is a Canadian artist based in London, Ontario, whose work combines painting, performance and storytelling. His paintings are held in the collections of The University of Western Ontario, Museum London, and the Canada Council Art Bank, (Ottawa).

== Early life ==
After living in a number of small towns in Northern Ontario, Willmore's family settled in Sarnia, Ontario. Willmore later moved to London, Ontario, to study art. He enrolled on a design course at Fanshawe College in the early 1970s, but didn't complete his studies, leaving to work in construction trades; he later returned to Fanshawe and completed a Fine Art diploma program in 1980.

== Work ==
After graduating from Fanshawe, Willmore produced neo-expressionist painting, drawing and collage. He exhibited at Museum London, Nancy Poole’s gallery in Toronto, and at the London Forest City Gallery including its annual performance art festival.

In the early 1990s, he created a series of painted landscape and portrait works, and in 1994 an exhibition, A Forest the Size of France, combined painted, three-dimensional and performance aspects based on childhood memories of Northern Ontario.

His painting, Orange Erie Trawler, was awarded second prize in the Canadian Emerging Artist Price competition administered by the Canadian Art Foundation jointly with RBC and the Connor Clark Private Trust.

His current part-figurative paintings adapt sketches of Southern and Northern Ontario, and Canada’s east coast. In 2007, Wilmore's exhibition Organizing the Search for Tom Thomson was held at London’s McIntosh Gallery.

Since that time, his work has evolved to include numerous images of figures viewed from above, as exhibited in Interpolating Landscape, a major exhibition at Museum London from December 2013 to April 2014.
