= Hyde Park, London, Ontario =

Hyde Park
- Neighbourhood
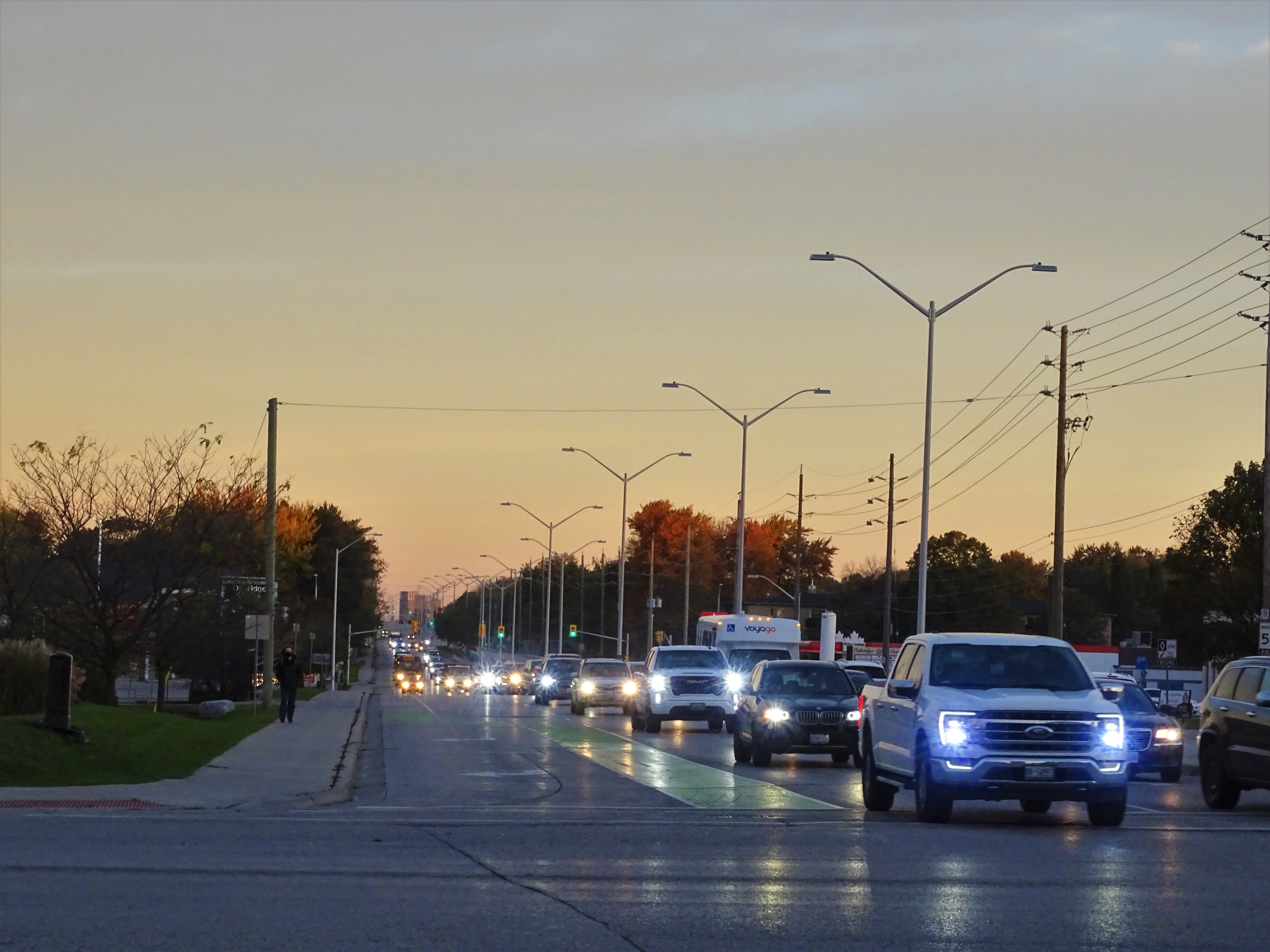
- Hyde Park Road

- Location in Ontario
- Coordinates: 43°02′16″N 81°17′07″W
- Country: Canada
- Province: Ontario
- City: London

Government
  - MP: Arielle Kayabaga (London West)
  - MPP: Peggy Sattler (London West)
  - Councillor: Corrine Rahman (Ward 7)

Population (2021)
  - Total: 12,690
- Time zone: UTC-5 (Eastern Time Zone)
  - Summer (DST): UTC-6 (Eastern Time Zone)
- Postal Code: N6H, N6G
- Area codes: 519, 226

Hyde Park is a neighbourhood in the city of London, Ontario, Canada. Located in the northern part of the city, the area is bordered by Fanshawe Park Road to the north and Sarnia Road to the south. Almost all of its residents live in low-density, single detached dwellings.

== History ==
Until 1963, the area was known as Hyde Park Corner. Hyde Park's first settlers arrived in 1818 from Cumberland, England, making the hamlet older than the city of London. The area's first school, Hyde Park School, was built around 1840. Churches and hotels were also later constructed in the area. In 1852, tracks for the Great Western Railway were laid near Hyde Park. The first post office was opened in 1859.

Acquired by the city of London by annexation in 1992, it was previously a rural area. After annexation, Hyde Park saw a construction boom, with a large amount of residential and commercial development. Presently, the neighbourhood consists of single detached homes, townhouses, and large apartment buildings.

For recreation, Hyde Park is located near the StarTech.com Community Centre and branches of the London Public Library. It is also a hub for the London Transit Commission. The neighbourhood is known for hosting the yearly Hyde Park Santa Claus Parade, organized by the local Hyde Park Business Improvement Area. Hyde Park is located near the Sifton Bog.

With a population of 12,690 as per the 2021 Canadian Census, Hyde Park has an almost even divide between men and women and has seen immense population growth. Most of its population is between the ages of 15 and 64 years old. The neighbourhood has a large immigrant population of nearly 42%.

== Government and politics ==
Federally, Hyde Park has been represented by the northwestern riding of London West. A longtime Liberal Party stronghold, it has been represented by Arielle Kayabaga since the 2021 Canadian federal election.

Provincially, Hyde Park has been represented by the northwestern riding of London West. A longtime Ontario New Democratic Party stronghold, the riding has been represented by the NDP's Peggy Sattler since 2013.

Municipally, Hyde Park has been represented by Corrine Rahman at London City Council since the 2022 London, Ontario, municipal election.

== Education ==
The neighbourhood is home to multiple elementary and secondary schools, including:

- Saint Marguerite D'Youville Catholic Elementary School (London District Catholic School Board)
- Emily Carr Public School (Thames Valley District School Board)
- St. John Catholic French Immersion Elementary School (London District Catholic School Board)
- Sir Frederick Banting Secondary School (Thames Valley District School Board)
- St. Andre Bessette Catholic Secondary School (London District Catholic School Board)
