= Westmount, London, Ontario =

Neighborhood in London, Ontario

Coordinates: 42.9477°N 81.2969°W

Westmount
- Neighbourhood
- Location within Ontario
- Country: Canada
- Province: Ontario
- City: London

Government
  - Type: Municipal (Ward 10)
  - Administrative body: London City Council
  - Councillor: Paul Van Meerbergen

Population (2016)
  - Total: 18,985
- Time zone: UTC-5 (Eastern Time Zone)
  - Summer (DST): UTC-6 (Eastern Time Zone)
- Area codes: 519, 226

Westmount is a neighbourhood in the southwest part of London, Ontario, Canada. As of the 2016 Canadian census, the population of Westmount is 18,985 (2016). The top five ethnic origins (in order) are English, Scottish, Canadian, Irish, and German. The average household income for the neighbourhood is $98,850, one of the highest in the city, however employment levels are down in comparison with the city. The top three occupations of Westmount residents are: Sales and Service occupations, Business & Finance, and Administration.

== History ==
In the late 1960s, London housing developer Sifton Properties began planning for a massive residential community in the southwest area of the city. The subdivision named Westmount was to be the largest planned community in London with over 30,000 residents. It would combine high-density residential apartments with low-density houses and townhomes. Also, recreational facilities including an outdoor pool and parks would be built.

The centerpiece of the community would be a commercial shopping mall. Westmount Shopping Centre's first phase opened originally in 1971 with 15 stores including a Dominion and Shoppers Drug Mart.
