= Catholic Central High School (London, Ontario) =

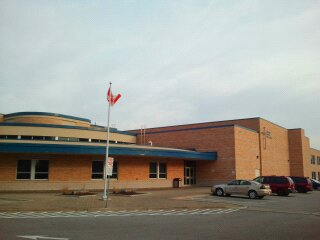

Location
- 450 Dundas Street; London, Ontario, N6K 3K3; Canada; 42.9883°N 81.2393°W

Information
- School type: Catholic high school
- Motto: Virtus et Scientia
- Religious affiliation: Roman Catholic
- Founded: 1950
- School board: London District Catholic School Board
- Superintendent: Kelly Holbrough
- School number: 3119
- Principal: Catherine Veteri
- Grades: 9-12
- Enrollment: 1035 (September 2021)
- Language: English
- Area: Downtown London
- Colours: Blue and White
- Mascot: Crusader
- Team name: CCH Crusaders
- Website: cch.ldcsb.ca

Catholic Central High School (CCH) is a Catholic secondary school in London, Ontario.

It is Ontario's first junior Catholic high school, opening with grades 7 to 13 in September 1950. The new building was a junior high school with grades 7 to 10. The original building on site was formerly known as Sacred Heart Convent, and it housed grades 11, 12, 13 for several years but dropped grades 7 and 8 when enrolment in grades 9 & 10 increased. CCH is administered by the London District Catholic School Board.

The school offers a wide range of programs, including the International Baccalaureate Diploma Programme, Environmental Leadership Program, English as a Second Language program, and the Music Extension program, which mostly serves graduates of St. Mary Choir School. It also has a co-op program called LEAP (Leaders in Exercise Athletics Program). CCH attracts students from the downtown area as well as the greater London region.

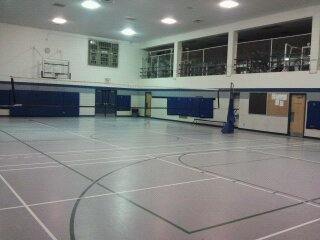
200pxThe single gym of Catholic Central, located on second floor.

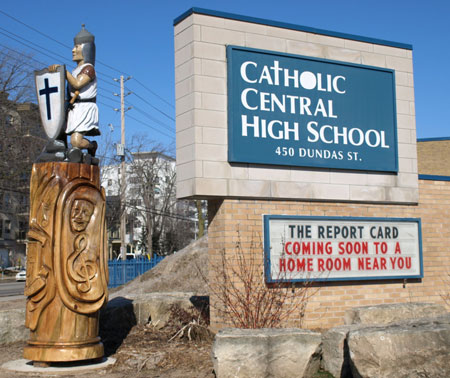

== History ==
Catholic Central High School, named after the high school of the same name in Detroit, Michigan, was opened in September 1950 in what had been the Sacred Heart Convent. It consisted of grades XI, XII and XIII. The Sisters of St. Joseph taught the girls, and the commercial classes and the Christian Brothers taught the boys in the general classes under associate principalships held by Sr. Mary Angela and Brother Stanislaus, respectively. By January 5, 1951, the Catholic Central sports teams had adopted the name Crusaders. The girls were known as Crusaderettes. It was about the autumn of 1952 that the words to the "Crusader Song" were composed by Barry McIlhargey, a grade XII student and football player. Meanwhile, the cornerstone for Sacred Heart Separate School, to the immediate west of Catholic Central High School, was laid on December 8, 1951. By the time the school was officially opened on September 14, 1952, the school's name had been changed to Catholic Central Separate School (CCSS) and consisted of grades VII, VIII, IX and X. Sr. Elaine Dunn was its first principal. With the opening of CCSS, St. Angela's College, De La Salle High School and Sacred Heart Commercial closed their doors and their pupils were now absorbed into Catholic Central Separate School.

In the fall of 1958, the construction of a new building for Catholic Central High School (CCHS) was begun to the west of Catholic Central Separate School. It opened for its first students in September 1959. In September 1963, CCHS was placed under the principalship of the Oblates of Mary Immaculate with Fr. Harold Conway as principal. The Board had first attempted to entice the Basilans to take over the running of the school, but the latter declined. In 1967, CCHS and Catholic Central Separate School, which for several years held only grade IX and X students, were joined under one principalship, with Fr. Conway as the first principal for grades IX-XIII A "tunnel" which was half above ground, was constructed to physically unite the two structures, which became known as the East Wing and the West Wing Owing to an increase in student population, a total of 14 portables were added between 1970 and 1972. The north wing, which accommodates the fine arts and family studies programs, was constructed in 1986.

In 1997 and 1998, a massive renovation of the school began. This renovation included the complete renovation of both the east and west wings as well as an addition which unified both wings and added a new chapel, atrium, library, technology wing, new computer and science labs, gymnasiums, cafeteria and administration, guidance and office area.

== Notable alumni ==
- Anne Marie DeCicco-Best - former Mayor of London
- John Ferris - former MPP for London South
- Pete Howard - CFL Football player (Hamilton Tiger Cats)
- Carol Off - Canadian television and radio journalist, associated with CBC Television and CBC Radio
- Brendan Shanahan - NHL Hockey player (New Jersey Devils)
- Ryan Thelwell - CFL Football player (Calgary Stampeders)

== See also ==
- Education in Ontario
- List of secondary schools in Ontario
