= Stokes Bay, Ontario (community) =

Stokes Bay
- Community
- Location within Bruce County Location within Southern Ontario
- Coordinates: 45.002164°N 81.366921°W
- Country: Canada
- Province: Ontario
- County: Bruce County
- Municipality: Northern Bruce Peninsula
- Time zone: UTC-5 (EST)
  - Summer (DST): UTC-4 (EDT)
- Area code: 519
- Website: www.northbrucepeninsula.ca/en

Stokes Bay is a community (Canadian Post code N0H 2M0 & N0H 0A9), in the Municipality of Northern Bruce Peninsula on Bruce Peninsula (which partly encloses Georgian Bay), and the eastern shore of Lake Huron, in Ontario.
