= London District Catholic School Board =

School district in Ontario, Canada

London District Catholic School Board LDCSB
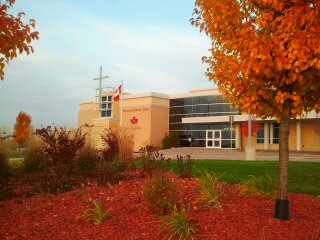

Address
- 5200 Wellington Road South London, Ontario, N6E 3X8; Canada
- Coordinates: 42.897°N 81.203°W

District information
- Grades: JK-12
- Superintendents: Stephanie Circelli, Education; Ana Paula Fernandes, Education; Dan Peters, Education; Mark Santandrea, Education; Debbie Jordan, Business and Treasurer, Susan Nickle, Executive Officer (Superintendent) People and Culture and General Counsel
- Chair of the board: Linda Steel
- Director of education: Vince Romeo
- Schools: 43 Elementary; 9 Secondary; 1 St. Patrick Adult and Continuing Education
- Budget: CA$273 million million (2019-20)
- District ID: B67032
- Enrollment: approximately 23,000 (September 2021)

Other information
- Elected Trustees: Linda Steel, Chair; Gabe Pizzuti, Vice Chair; Bill Hall; Matt Pizzuti; Sandra Cruz; Josh Lamb; John Jevnikar; Mary Holmes
- Website: www.ldcsb.ca

The London District Catholic School Board (LDCSB), known as English-language Separate District School Board No. 38 prior to 1999 is a separate school board offering Catholic education in Southwestern Ontario, Canada. It serves students from the cities of London, St. Thomas and Woodstock, as well as the counties of Elgin, Middlesex and Oxford.

== Secondary schools ==
=== London ===
- Catholic Central High School
- John Paul II Catholic Secondary School
- Mother Teresa Catholic Secondary School
- Regina Mundi Catholic College
- St. Andre Bessette Catholic Secondary School
- St. Thomas Aquinas Secondary School

=== St. Thomas ===
- St. Joseph's Catholic High School

=== Strathroy ===
- Holy Cross Catholic Secondary School

=== Woodstock ===
- St. Mary's Catholic High School

== Elementary schools ==
=== Aylmer ===
- Assumption Catholic School

=== Delaware ===
- Our Lady of Lourdes Catholic School

=== Dorchester ===
- St. David Catholic School

=== Glencoe ===
- St. Charles Catholic School

=== Ingersoll ===
- St. Jude's Catholic School

=== London ===
- Blessed Sacrament Catholic School
- Holy Family Catholic School
- Holy Rosary Catholic School
- Notre Dame Catholic School
- Sir Arthur Carty Catholic School
- St. Anne Catholic School
- St. Anthony French Immersion Catholic School
- St. Bernadette Catholic School
- St. Catherine of Siena Catholic School
- St. Francis Catholic School
- St. George Catholic School
- St. John Catholic French Immersion School
- St. Jude Catholic School
- St. Kateri Catholic School
- St. Marguerite d'Youville Catholic School
- St. Mark Catholic School
- St. Martin Catholic School
- St. Mary Choir & Orchestra Catholic School
- St. Michael Catholic School
- St. Nicholas Catholic School
- St. Paul Catholic School
- St. Pius X Catholic School
- St. Rose of Lima Catholic Elementary School
- St. Sebastian Catholic School
- St. Theresa Catholic School
- St. Thomas More Catholic School

=== Lucan ===
- St. Patrick Catholic School

=== Parkhill ===
- Sacred Heart Catholic School

=== St. Thomas ===
- Monsignor Morrison Catholic School
- St. Anne's Catholic School

=== Strathroy ===
- Our Lady Immaculate Catholic School
- St. Vincent de Paul Catholic School

=== Tillsonburg ===
- Monsignor J.H. O'Neil Catholic School
- St. Joseph's Catholic School

=== West Lorne ===
- St. Mary's Catholic School

=== Woodstock ===
- Holy Family French Immersion Catholic School
- St. Michael's Catholic School
- St. Patrick's Catholic School

== Adult and Continuing Education ==
=== London ===
- St. Patrick Adult and Continuing Education

== See also ==
- List of Schools in London, Ontario
- List of School Districts in Ontario
- List of High Schools in Ontario
- Thames Valley District School Board
