= Fanshawe College =

Public college in London, Canada

Fanshawe College of Applied Arts and Technology
- Other name: Fanshawe College
- Motto: Unlocking Potential
- Type: Public college
- Established: 1967; 59 years ago
- Affiliations: CBIE; CICan
- Chair: Michael Geraghty
- President: Peter Devlin
- Faculty: 441 full-time
- Students: 2025: 13,445 FTEs
- Location: London, Ontario, Canada; 43°00′45″N 81°12′01″W
- Campus: Urban
- Colours: Red and grey
- Nickname: Falcons
- Sporting affiliations: CCAA – OCAA
- Mascot: Freddie the Falcon
- Website: fanshawec.ca

Fanshawe College of Applied Arts and Technology, operating as Fanshawe College, is a public college in Southwestern Ontario, Canada. One of the largest colleges in Canada, it has campuses in London, Simcoe, St. Thomas and Woodstock with additional locations in Southwestern Ontario. Fanshawe has 21,000 full-time students at the London Campus.

== History ==
Fanshawe College was built in the former hamlet of Fanshawe (now part of London, Ontario), which was founded by Irishman Hamilton Hartley Killaly; Killaly built a large frame house there in the 1830s, called Killaly Castle, that lasted until the 1880s, when it collapsed from the movement of the Thames River. The hamlet's name was officially recorded in 1894 as the name of the post office; it is said to have been named for the Fanshawe peerage in Ireland, which took its name from Fanshawe Gate in Derbyshire, recorded in Middle English as Fawnchall gate.

The Ontario Vocational Centre London held its first classes on September 28, 1964. In 1967, it became Fanshawe College, part of a provincial system of applied arts and technology colleges. Fanshawe subsequently established campuses in Woodstock, St. Thomas, and Simcoe. The London campus originally consisted of three buildings but has since been subject to a series of extensions.

James A. Colvin was named Fanshawe College's first president in 1967 and held the position until 1979, when he was succeeded by Harry Rawson, who served as president until his retirement in 1987. Barry Moore was the third president from 1987 to 1996. Howard Rundle, Fanshawe's longest-serving president, subsequently led the college for 18 years until his retirement on August 31, 2013. Peter Devlin became president of the college on September 3, 2013 and had served as a lieutenant general in the Canadian Army.

The Fanshawe College Arboretum was established in 1995.

In May 2011, the college opened its Centre for Applied Transportation Technologies, with a capacity of 1,500 students. The college established the Norton Wolf School of Aviation Technology after purchasing Jazz Aviation facilities at London International Airport in August 2013.

In 2014, Fanshawe announced that it would purchase the building of the recently closed Kingsmill's Department Store for expansion of its downtown London campus with a request for an additional grant of $10 million from City Council. The request proved politically contentious in a municipal election year with it being initially refused by Council following a tie vote on July 29. However, after the local organization, Downtown London, put up $1 million in support of this initiative, London City Council narrowly voted to approve the remainder of the funding after minor additional contract changes in its favor.

In September 2014, Fanshawe College established its School of Public Safety, to provide public safety programs. In June 2016, Fanshawe opened its Canadian Centre for Product Validation (CCPV), a 25,000 square feet (2,300 m^{2}) testing facility.

On April 27, 2015, the family of Don Smith, co-founder of EllisDon, announced the School of Building Technology would be renamed the Donald J. Smith School of Building Technology in his honor. Don was the first recipient of a Fanshawe College honorary diploma in 1992. In 2008, Fanshawe presented his wife, Joan, with an honorary diploma.

In 2018, Fanshawe established its fifth school, the School of Digital and Performing Arts, offering creative programs previously offered by the School of Contemporary Media and School of Design. 130 Dundas Street opened in September 2018. The new building is home to 1,600 students from the School of Information Technology and the School of Tourism, Hospitality and Culinary Arts.

In 2022 ILAC International College announced they would begin offering Fanshawe programs.

== Programs ==
Fanshawe offers more than 200 degree, diploma, certificate and apprenticeship programs to 43,000 students each year.

The College has 11 academic schools: Donald J. Smith School of Building Technology and Design; Lawrence Kinlin School of Business; Norton Wolf School of Aviation and Aerospace Technology; School of Advanced Manufacturing, Science and Transportation; School of Arts and Language; School of Community Studies; School of Health Sciences; School of Information Technology; School of Nursing; School of Public Safety, Law and Administration; and School of Hospitality.

== Athletics ==
Fanshawe College joined the Ontario College Athletic Association (OCAA) in 1967 as one of the six founding members. The Falcons currently compete in 14 varsity sports, with 19 teams including: men's and women's basketball, men's and women's volleyball, men's and women's indoor and outdoor soccer, men's and women's golf, men's and women's badminton, men's and women's cross-country, men's baseball, women's softball and men's and women's and mixed curling.

Many of Fanshawe's varsity programs participate not only in the OCAA but also the Canadian Colleges Athletic Association (CCAA). As of the 2021/22 season, the Falcons have a total of 22 national championships, 152 provincial championships and a total of 432 medals.

Fanshawe Athletics set a Fanshawe record totals for most medals in a season in 2018/19 with 28 overall medals. The Falcons led the Ontario Colleges Athletic Association (OCAA), winning 11 OCAA Championships this season to go along with 21 OCAA medals. The 11 championships shattered Fanshawe's own record of six from 2017/18. Fanshawe Athletics also set a new school record for most national medals in a single season (7). The 2018–19 season saw Fanshawe win two Canadian Collegiate Athletic Association (CCAA) National Championships, 5 national bronze, 11 provincial gold, 6 provincial silver and 4 provincial bronze medals.

Additionally, Fanshawe has one of the largest campus recreation programs in Ontario with over 4500 students participating in intramurals, extramural and open recreation every year.

== Campuses ==
=== London Campus ===
Fanshawe's campus in London, Ontario, Canada covers 100 acres (40 ha) and has twenty-three buildings, including nearly 1200 apartment-style residence rooms and close to 400 townhouse rooms. The London Campus includes the School of Transportation Technology and Apprenticeship and the Norton Wolf School of Aviation Technology. The London campus has been described as "one of the largest in Ontario" and as a "city within a city".

=== London Downtown Campus ===
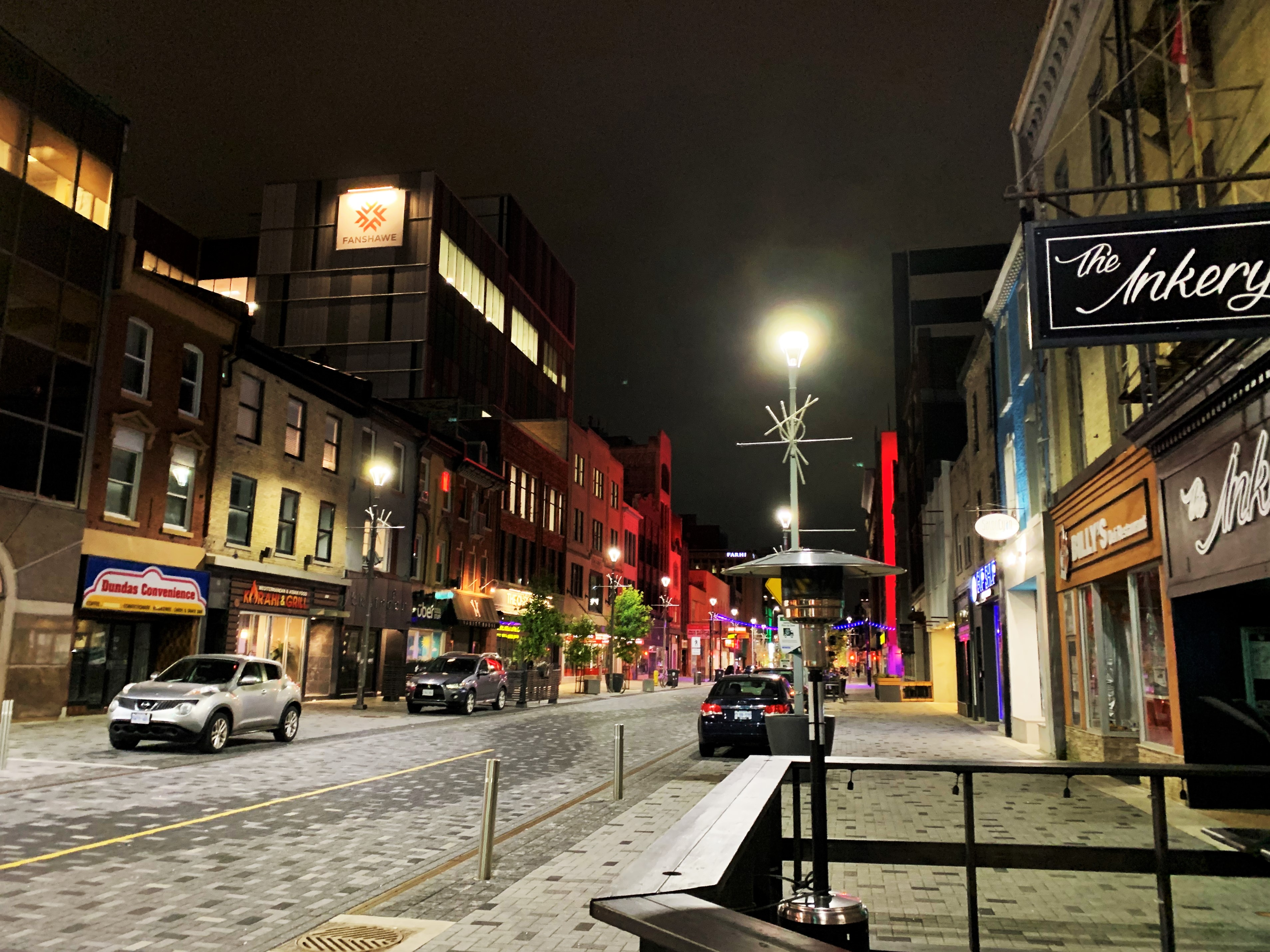
Fanshawe College's downtown campus on Dundas Street in London

Fanshawe's London Downtown Campus was established in 2018. It has three buildings, located at 431 Richmond Street (Access Studies), 130 Dundas Street (Schools of Information Technology and Tourism, Hospitality and Culinary Arts) and 137 Dundas Street (School of Digital and Performing Arts).

=== London South Campus ===
Fanshawe's newest campus, London South, is located at 1060 Wellington Rd. South. The newly renovated building opened in September 2019 and hosts five programs currently, Business Management, Business and Information Systems Architecture, Agri-Business Management, Health Care Administration Management and Retirement Residence Management. The campus was formerly a Westervelt College campus, which closed in 2017. The campus closed in September 2026 after a decline of international students in Canada.

=== St. Thomas/Elgin Regional Campus ===
The St. Thomas/Elgin Regional Campus, located in the southeast end of St. Thomas, Ontario, is home to approximately 350 full-time students and 2,000 part-time students. The Campus offers certificate and diploma programs, academic upgrading, apprenticeships, continuing education, corporate training, and career and employment services.

=== Simcoe/Norfolk Regional Campus ===
The Simcoe/Norfolk Regional Campus is home to almost 200 full-time students and hundreds more part-time students. The campus offers certificate, diploma and graduate certificate programs, academic upgrading, continuing education, corporate training and career and employment services. Full-time programs that are unique to this campus are Adventure Expeditions and Interpretive Leadership, Developmental Services Worker (Accelerated) and Early Childhood Education (Accelerated). It was the first Fanshawe campus to offer the Agri-Business Management graduate certificate program.

=== Woodstock/Oxford Regional Campus ===
The Woodstock/Oxford Regional Campus, located at the forks of Highways 401 and 403, is home to approximately 450 full-time students and 2,000 part-time students. The Campus offers certificate and diploma programs, apprenticeships, academic upgrading, continuing education, corporate training and more. Full-time programs that are unique to this campus are Business – Entrepreneurship and Management, Hair Stylist, Police Foundations (Accelerated) and Heating, Refrigeration and Air Conditioning Technician.

=== Huron/Bruce Regional Sites ===
Fanshawe has been in the central Huron/Bruce area, north of London, since approximately 2007. Currently programs are held at the Bruce Technology Skills and Training Centre.

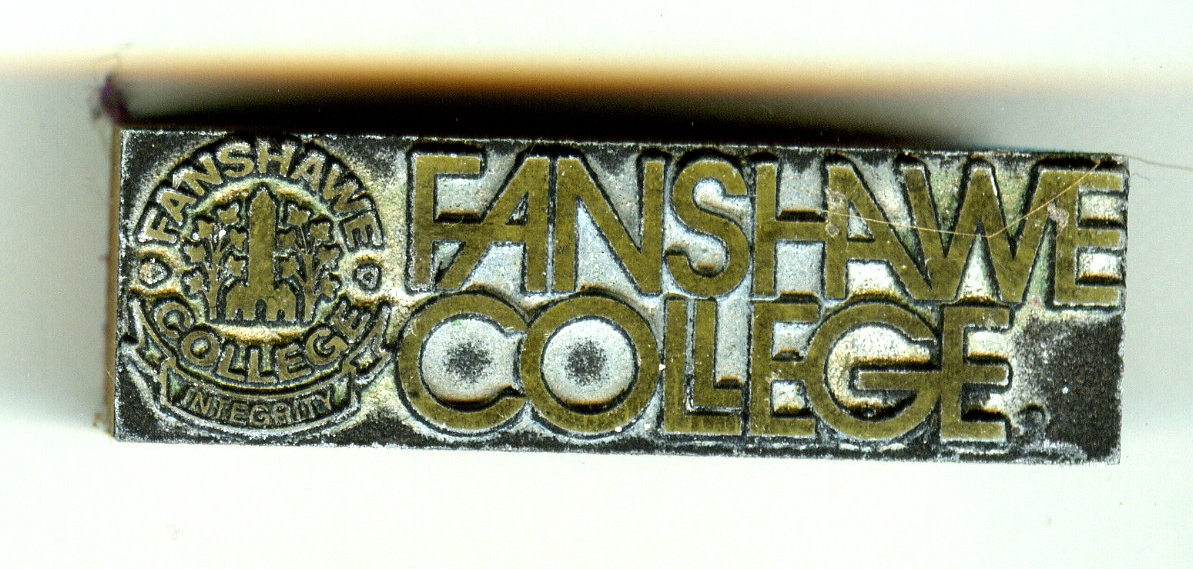
Fanshawe College old logo (printers template 1974)

== Student government ==
The Fanshawe Student Union (FSU) is a student representative body, designed to meet the various needs and expectations of students attending Fanshawe College. The FSU has had a student newspaper since its inception, first known as Fanfare, changing to The Dam in 1971. It has been known as The Interrobang since approximately 1979 and is Fanshawe's only student newspaper. It is published biweekly from September to April and distributed on-campus free of charge throughout Fanshawe College. The Interrobang, is a member of Canadian University Press.

In 2025, the FSU announced it will shutter The Interrobang. Its final edition was set to publish on April 4.

== Notable alumni ==
* David Willsie, Paralympic athlete
- Damian Warner, decathlete and Olympian
- Nicole Coenen, author, lumberjack, and social media influencer
- Caroline Cameron, television sportscaster
- Les Stroud, musician, filmmaker, and survival expert
- Brad Long, chef
- Cheryl Hickey, host of ET Canada
- Trevor Morris, orchestral composer and music producer
- Emm Gryner, singer-songwriter and actress
- Steven Sabados, television show host, interior designer and writer
- Kelley Armstrong, writer
- Anne Marie DeCicco-Best, mayor of London, Ontario
- Carol Mitchell, politician
- Greg Brady, radio and sports broadcaster
- William Peter Randall, musician and politician
- Nathan Robitaille, sound editor
- Bruce Smith, Ontario politician
- Sam Stout, retired professional Mixed Martial Artist
- Glenn Thibeault, politician
- Maria Van Bommel, Ontario politician
- Jeff Willmore, artist
- Craig Mann – re–recording mixer
- Dana Lewis – television news correspondent

== Notable faculty ==
- Eric Atkinson – artist and art educator
- Moe Berg – singer-songwriter and record producer, professor in the Music Industry Arts program.
- Dan Brodbeck – record producer
- Gerald Fagan – choral conductor
- Jack Richardson – record producer

== See also ==
- Higher education in Ontario
- List of colleges in Ontario
- Asteroid 21375 Fanshawe
