= List of unsolved murders in Canada =

The following is a list of unsolved homicides in Canada. Hundreds of homicides occur across Canada each year, many of which end up as cold cases. In 2021, the country's intentional homicide rate stood at around 2.06 per 100,000 individuals, increasing for the third consecutive year. Violent crime continued to increase in Canada during the following year, with the homicide rate reaching 2.25 per 100,000 people in 2022, the highest rate in the past three decades.

== Individual victims ==
=== 20th century ===
Year	Victim(s)	Age	Location	Province	Notes
1924	Janet Smith	22	Vancouver	British Columbia	Janet Kennedy Smith, a Scottish immigrant who worked as a nursemaid, was found dead in the cellar of her residency in 1924. She had been discovered by a fellow suitemate with a gunshot wound through her temple and a .45-caliber revolver near her right hand. The fellow suitemate was a Chinese immigrant named Wong Foon Sing. He also worked as a domestic worker alongside Smith. On the night of the murder, Sing claims to have heard what sounded like a car backfiring, and then went down to the cellar of the house where he found Smith's body. Although authorities and the coroner who examined her body both initially thought that Smith killed herself, many believe that she had actually been the victim of murder.
1926	Agapit Leblanc	39	Bouctouche Bay	New Brunswick	Canadian Fishery officer. He was 39 years old when he died on October 20, 1926, while investigating illegal smelt fishing. He was the first Canadian Fishery officer to be murdered while on duty. His body was found underwater, weighted down with rocks. His murderers were never found.
1933	George Anthony Lenhard	28	Regina	Saskatchewan	In 1933, Constable George Lenhard was gunned down in Regina's warehouse district by an unknown individual(s). The very first Regina police officer to die in the line of duty, Lenhard was serving his third year on the police force when his death occurred. To this day, the murder remains unsolved.
1953	David and Derek D'Alton	6 & 7	Vancouver	British Columbia	The bodies of two boys were found concealed at Stanley Park in 1953, six years after the time they were actually murdered. The police had thought the boys to be between the ages of 7 and 10; both were wearing aviation helmets.In 2022, upon DNA testing, the boys were identified as the brothers David and Derek D'Alton, aged 6 and 7.
1956	Susan Cadieux	5	London	Ontario	Susan Cadieux had been playing with her brothers and a friend at St. Mary's Church across the street from her home. A male stranger approached, claiming that he was to meet with the priest. When one of the other children fell on the ice, everyone was distracted, and Susan and the man vanished. At 10:08 am the next morning, a father-son search team found Susan's body just over a mile away. Her autopsy said that she had been dead for less than three hours. She had been found fully clothed, but she had been sexually assaulted.
1959	Lynne Harper	12	Clinton	Ontario	Lynne Harper disappeared near a Canadian Air Force Base, before her body was found two days later on a nearby farm. Lynne's classmate Steven Truscott was convicted of the murder, later having the conviction overturned.
1962	Alexandra Wiwcharuk	23	Saskatoon	Saskatchewan	Nursing student and beauty queen Alexandra Wiwcharuk was found brutally murdered in a shallow grave beside the South Saskatchewan River in City Park, on May 31, 1962, nearly two weeks after she went missing.
1962	Julian "Julie" Wolanski	16	Toronto	Ontario	Julian Wolanski was found in a roadside ditch by the Humber River in northwest Toronto on August 12, 1962, wearing only silk stockings. Her autopsy revealed that she had been raped and beaten, and then her killer shot her in the heart with a .32-calibre bullet fired at close range.
1963-1964	Margaret Sheeler (née Butterman)	20	London	Ontario	Margaret Sheeler was found in a field just west of the townhouse where she lived by two boys on January 23, 1964. She was last seen alive on December 27, 1963, when she left her home after an argument with her husband. Her husband reported her missing to London Police the following day. The cause of her death was a skull fracture and her clothes had been taken off and strewn around her. She was five to six months pregnant at the time of her death. London Police initially sought an ex-boyfriend of Sheeler's but later decided against questioning this man.
1967	Salvatore "Sammy" Triumbari	34	Toronto	Ontario	One of Toronto's oldest unsolved mob murders. Salvatore "Sammy" Triumbari was an extortionist who belonged to the Siderno Group. On January 6, 1967, he was gunned down in the driveway of his residence in North Toronto by multiple shooters. Police say that Triumbari was killed out of revenge for disfiguring a rival gang member, a crime he carried out with fellow mobster Filippe Vendemini. Vendemini would be assassinated two years later in another unsolved homicide.
1968	Newton Harold Boutilier	81	French Village	Nova Scotia	Newton Boutilier was found deceased in his residence, which also served as a small general store, which he owned and operated on Highway 33. Foul play was not originally suspected. Traces of blood were found on a door and an ice cream cooler, and an autopsy was later ordered.
1969	Teresa Martin	14	Montreal	Quebec	On September 12, 1969, the body of Teresa Martin was found in the parking lot of the Vieux Cyprès Tavern. Her body had been positioned deliberately to make her appear as she was sitting up against a wall. She was last seen leaving the Galeries d'Anjou cinema with her friends.
1970	Claire Gagnon	16	Dieppe	New Brunswick	Claire Gagnon's body was found in a field 300 yards from her home on May 25. She had a wire or a rope around her neck and a towel in her mouth. In 1993, charges were filed against a man who confessed to killing Claire. However, it was later confirmed that he had been in a psychiatric hospital when she had been murdered, and the charges were dropped.
1971	Alice Paré	14	Sainte-Clotilde-de-Horton	Quebec	Alice Paré disappeared on her way home from a music lesson in Drummondville. On the morning of April 26, 1971, her body was found about 60 feet from a gravel road, still in her school uniform.
1971	Mary Anne Plett	29	Edmonton	Alberta	An Edmonton real estate agent, Mary Anne Plett disappeared on September 15, 1971, while showing property to a prospective client. Plett's car was found abandoned two days later; her briefcase was found in October near Fort Assiniboine, 160 kilometres north of Edmonton. Plett's body was found in the same area the following April.
1972	Ursula Schulze	19	Saint-Philippe	Quebec	Ursula's body was found on July 14, 1972, behind a former soap warehouse on rang Saint-Claude. She had been shot. On July 13, 1972, while Ursula had been waiting for a bus, witnesses saw an individual get out of a burgundy red or red-brown Buick Skylark or Toyota, grab Ursula by the arm, and force her into the car.
1972	Suzanne Aldworth	16	Waterloo	Ontario	Suzanne Aldworth disappeared after celebrating her sixteenth birthday with two girlfriends and her boyfriend at the Kent Hotel (now the Huether) on King Street North in uptown Waterloo on Friday, November 17, 1972. Her boyfriend left at 1 a.m. because he had to work the next morning. Suzanne and her friends proceeded to a nearby Chinese restaurant around 1:15 a.m. She left the restaurant just before 2 a.m. to make a call from a payphone across the street, probably to let her parents know she was going to sleep at a friend's house. One of her brothers heard the phone ring, but didn't get to it in time. Two days later, on November 19, 1972, two girls riding on horseback found Suzanne in a ditch by a country road near St. Agatha, about 11 kilometres west of Waterloo. She was naked and had been badly beaten, dying of a fractured skull. According to Ontario Provincial Police, she had not been sexually assaulted. Police have long suspected two members of the Henchmen biker gang (one of whom died by suicide in 1979), but said they had no witness or DNA evidence.
1973	Pauline Ivy Dudley	17	Milton	Ontario	Pauline is said to have left Oakville at about 10 pm on August 20, 1973. Her decomposed body was found by a farmer near Highway 25 and Lower Base Line a week later on August 28. She was fully clothed, with a hairline fracture in her jaw and her wallet nearby. Police believe there were efforts made by the perpetrator to conceal her body.
1973-1974	Carole Dupont	18	Sainte-Thérèse	Quebec	On April 13, 1974, police were notified of a pair of human legs sticking out of a snow bank near the parking lot of Foyer Drapeau, a nursing care residence in Sainte-Thérèse. They discovered the body of Claudette Dupont alongside clothes and a knife. The victim had suffered multiple stab wounds to her torso and back, was diagonally slashed at the thighs, and had a cut on her left breast. She had last been seen on the night of December 22 leaving the Hôtel Blainville bar with three men after having drinks with a female friend, and was subsequently reported missing.
1974	Suzanne Miller	25	London	Ontario	On October 12, 1974, Suzanne Miller was found in a wooded area near the Thames River in Thorndale, northwest of London. She was last seen on September 16, 1974, when she left her London apartment in her blue Datsun car. Miller was supposed to have met her sister at her sister's apartment, but did not show up. Her car was found a week later in the parking lot of the Argyle Mall in London. Miller's body, still clothed, was badly decomposed and she had died of blunt force trauma to the head.
1974	Beverly Lynn Smith	22	Raglan	Ontario	On December 9, 1974, Beverly was found dead in the kitchen by a neighbour's wife when Beverly's husband Doug had called to check up on her as she wasn't answering his calls. Doug and Beverly's infant daughter, 10-month-old Rebecca, was found in the next room. An autopsy showed that Beverly had been killed by a .22 bullet to the back of the head and the case was ruled a homicide. In 1988, Doug Daigle would be arrested based on a tip through Crime Stoppers, but would be released after no confession was given. On March 17, 2008, Alan Smith (no relation) would be arrested and charged with second-degree murder in relation with Beverly's murder, but would have his charges dropped after his wife Linda recanted her incriminating statement in July 2008. Linda would be convicted of obstruction of justice. Alan would be charged with first-degree murder after confessing in 2009, claiming that he killed her with another man to steal marijuana before claiming that he killed her alone to keep her silent about an affair. Alan would be acquitted by the Ontario Superior Court in July 2014 due to lack of evidence and no new leads have surfaced in Beverly's death.
1975	Lisa Choquette	30	Vimont	Quebec	The nude corpse of 30-year-old Montreal woman Lisa Choquette was found at a construction site in Laval on April 22, 1975, in an apparent strangulation slaying.
1975	Diane Déry and Mario Corbeil	13 & 15	Longueuil	Quebec	On May 20, 1975, Diane Déry and Mario Corbeil left Diane's home to go for a motorcycle ride. Their bodies were found the next morning in a wooded area at the end of Rolland-Therrien boulevard.
1975	Mariam Peters	16	Toronto	Ontario	Mariam had been leaving St. Patrick station on November 7, 1975, around 8 pm, to visit her grandfather at Mount Sinai Hospital, when she was stabbed 16 times. Police found her unconscious on an escalator, and she died four days later.
1976	Rhona Margaret Duncan	16	North Vancouver	British Columbia	On the evening of July 16, 1976, Rhona Duncan and some friends attended a house party on East Queens Avenue in North Vancouver. Duncan's body was discovered the following morning behind a neighbour's garage. She was partially undressed, and had been sexually assaulted and strangled.
1976	Tara Jane White	19	near Mînî Thnî	Alberta	Tara Jane White was a teen from Banff who was studying at the University of Calgary. She was last seen leaving a residence in the Dalhousie neighbourhood of Calgary and was reported missing on July 3, 1976. In March 1981, her skeletal remains were found in a shallow grave in a wooded area off of Alberta Highway 1A.
1976	Marie Judy Goudreau	17	near Edmonton	Alberta	Marie Judy Goudreau was a 17-year-old high school student who lived near Edmonton, Alberta. After visiting the city on August 2, 1976, she was driving home on Range Road 244 and suddenly choked by an unknown individual, dying due to lack of oxygen. Her body was found in a pond days later, many kilometres from the area. Her clothing had been removed but most of it was discovered nearby. DNA evidence was collected, but it didn't point to anybody. Her murder still remains unsolved.
1976–1977	Gordon Sanderson, also known as Septic Tank Sam	26	Tofield	Alberta	On April 13, 1977, a body was discovered in a septic tank on a rural property in Tofield, Alberta, after the property owner discovered a leg in the tank. The police spent an hour emptying the tank with ice cream buckets and retrieved the body. An autopsy revealed that Sanderson, then known as "Septic Tank Sam", had been beaten, burned with a butane torch and cigarettes, and sexually mutilated to the point where it took months for his sex to be determined, before finally being shot in the head and torso. His murderer(s) then dumped the body into the septic tank headfirst, and filled it with quicklime to speed up decomposition, although it actually slowed it instead. On June 30, 2021, 44 years after Sam's initial discovery, he was identified as Gordon Edwin Sanderson through genetic genealogy.
1977	Ivan Wheeler	27	London	Ontario	Ivan was found dead in his taxi in the early morning of February 18, 1977, in the parking lot of a London racquet club. He had been shot in the back of the head. His wallet, coin changer, and brief case were found in the cab untouched.
1977	Louise Camirand	20	Magog	Quebec	Louise Camirand was last seen on March 23, 1977, at a Provi-Soir convenience store in Sherbrooke. Her remains were found two days later along McDonell Road near Giguère Road (now Duval Road), near Austin (now Magog).
1977	Jocelyne Houle	24	Saint-Calixte	Quebec	On April 14, 1977, Jocelyne and a group of friends were at the bar Vieux Munich, when her friends left to go to another bar. Jocelyne, who had been seen walking in another direction with two men, never arrived, and was found dead in a ditch three days later.
1977	Claudette Poirier	15	Saint-Lucien	Quebec	Claudette Poirier disappeared on 27 July 1977 while riding her bicycle to visit her friends. Her skeletal remains were found by hunters on 9 October 1986. Cause of death could not be determined.
1977	Joanne Dorion	17	Fabreville	Quebec	Joanne's body was found on August 11, 1977, off of a gravel road about eight blocks from where she had last been seen. Her body was in an advanced state of decomposition. She had been stabbed multiple times, and it was impossible to determine if she had been sexually assaulted.
1977	Hélène Monast	18	Chambly	Quebec	Hélène's naked body was found on September 11, 1977, in a park along the Chambly Canal.
1977	Katherine Hawkes	34	Cartierville	Quebec	In the early evening of September 21, 1977, the body of Katherine Hawkes was discovered near a train station by a pair of students.
1978	Manon Dubé	10	Ayer's Cliff	Quebec	Manon Dubé, a child from Sherbrooke, went missing in January 1978. Her remains were found many kilometres away, about two months later. There was speculation that she might have been killed by a hit-and-run driver, who then hid the body to conceal the crime.
1978	Lison Blais	17	Montreal	Quebec	Lison's body was found by Rudolf Pacesa on June 4, 1978, in the alley behind her home. She was almost fully nude, had been sexually assaulted with an object, hit on the head by a brick, and had strangulation marks on her neck. Her clothes and purse were not found.
1978	Theresa Allore	19	Compton	Quebec	Champlain College student Theresa Allore went missing on November 3, 1978. Her remains were found on April 13, 1979, approximately one kilometre from her dormitory building.
1979	Banff Jane Doe	24–25 (estimate)	Banff National Park	Alberta	The name given to an unidentified homicide victim whose remains were discovered by hikers at Banff National Park, about 330 metres off the Trans-Canada Highway, on April 8, 1979.
1979	Nicole Gaudreaux	31	Montreal	Quebec	Nicole's body was found on August 3, 1979, in a field behind 2032 rue Saint-Andre. She was naked, on her back, with her face bloody. She had sustained blunt force trauma to the head, and had been raped.
1979	Dora Ferguson	22	Hanwell	New Brunswick	Dora Ferguson was last seen in August 1979 walking along the Trans-Canada Highway in Island View. Her remains were found in a garbage bag on a nearby forest trail on 21 April 1996.
1980	Gérald Lapierre	50–59 (estimate)	Saint-Janvier-de-Joly	Quebec	On January 16, 1980, Gérald's body was found completely frozen by police officers. He had been shot and killed.
1981	Tammy Leakey	12	Dorval	Quebec	Tammy disappeared on the evening of March 12, 1981. At about 10:45 pm that evening, 73-year-old Ewing Tait was driving along Lindsay street in Dorval's industrial park, when he noticed something along the side of the road. Tammy's body was still warm when it was taken to Lachine General Hospital, where she was pronounced dead. The autopsy revealed that she had been strangled with a rope or electrical wire.
1981	Kelly Cook	15	Taber	Alberta	On June 28, 1981, the body of Kelly Cook (originally from Standard) was located in the Chin Lake Reservoir near Taber. While Kelly's body was at a funeral home in Calgary, an unknown man demanded to see her body. Even though he claimed to be a family friend, he was denied, and eventually left. This man has never been identified, but authorities believe it may have been her killer.
1981–1983	Theodore Frederick Kampf	46	Dawson City	Yukon	Kampf had travelled from New Jersey to Yukon in July 1981. His family reported him missing in October. In May 1983, remains were found in a wooded area near the North Fork Dam and the Dempster Highway. Forty years later, these remains were identified as Kampf.
1981	Kristin Gurholt	34	Vancouver	British Columbia	Kristin Gurholt's body was found in an alley behind 575 Richards Street on September 4, 1981. She was naked, and her skull was fractured. Her clothing was scattered around her, and a suitcase with her possessions was found nearby.
1981	Dana Bradley	14	St. John's	Newfoundland and Labrador	Dana had been hitchhiking on Topsail Road on December 14, 1981. Her body was found four days later in the woods near Maddox Cove. She had a fractured skull, and there was evidence of sexual assault.
1982	Dianne Aubert	23	Quebec City	Quebec	In February 1982, two unknown men entered the flat shared by dormmates Dianne Aubert and Maryline Grenier. Dianne, a transsexual, was stabbed to death, while Maryline was severely injured. The event is regarded to be a case of transphobic violence.
1982	Atilla Altıkat	45	Ottawa	Ontario	Altıkat was a Colonel in the Turkish Armed Forces who had been operating in Canada as a military attaché. He was fatally gunned down on his way to work on August 27, 1982, as part of a series of attacks on Turkish diplomats around the world. Although far-left Armenian militant group ASALA claimed responsibility for these attacks, Altıkat's specific killer has not since been named.
1982	Delia Maria Adriano	25	Milton	Ontario	On November 6, 1982, a lifeless naked body was located in a woodsy setting near Milton, Ontario. After examining dental records, the Halton Regional Police Service were able to identify the corpse as Delia Adriano, a 25-year-old Oakville resident who had gone missing six weeks beforehand.
1982	Stéphane Gauthier	12	Montreal	Quebec	On 21 December 1982, twelve-year-old Stéphane Gauthier disappeared from Montreal's Plateau neighborhood. His body was found two days later in a field in Anjou; he had been sexually assaulted and strangled. No one has been arrested in connection with the murder.
1983	Andrea Scherpf and Bernd Göricke	23 & 26	Chetwynd	British Columbia	A young couple from Germany who were visiting Canada. On October 3, 1983, the pair hitchhiked a ride from an unidentified driver of a 1960s Chevrolet pick-up. The murderer then shot the two, stole their belongings, and dumped their corpses 32 kilometres west of Chetwynd, near Highway 97 and the Pine River. Their remains were found on October 6, 1983.
1983	Donna Jean Awcock	17	London	Ontario	Donna Awcock disappeared in the early morning on October 13, 1983 after a babysitting job for a neighbour on Cheyenne Avenue (now Oakville Avenue) in Huron Heights. Her body was found later the same day on an embankment near Fanshawe Dam. She had been sexually assaulted and strangled.
1983	Paul Volpe	56	Toronto	Ontario	Nicknamed "The Fox", Paul Volpe was an Italian-Canadian Mafioso who belonged to New York's Buffalo crime family. Prior to his death, he had made a real estate financial transaction involving the Commisso 'ndrina, in which he cheated them. Additionally, Volpe expanded his organized crime operations from Southern Ontario to the State of New Jersey. This greatly annoyed the American Mafiosi, as it violated the "Mafia Code". Volpe had also agreed to be on documentary films by the Canadian Broadcasting Corporation about the role of the Mafia in Canada's economy, causing his fellow mafia members to become very angry with him. As a result of Volpe's behavior, the Commissos struck an arrangement with the Buffalo crime family to have Volpe killed. The Buffalo crime family ultimately agreed, hiring hitman Cecil Kirby to carry out the deed. Unbeknownst to the mafia, Cecil Kirby had been working as an informant for the Royal Canadian Mounted Police at the time when the Commisso 'ndrina contracted him to kill Paul Volpe. Kirby told his law enforcement handlers about the plot to assassinate Volpe. Sgt. Al King of the Toronto Police Service then paid Volpe a visit, informing him that a contract had been placed on his life. King offered Volpe a deal where he would stage his death, to which Volpe agreed. While being hidden from the public eye within the Toronto RCMP Building, Cecil Kirby visited Rocco Remo of the Commisso 'ndrina to tell him that he had killed Volpe. Remo believed the lie, but only gave Kirby a portion of his promised money for the crime, assuring them that he would provide him with the rest later. With proper evidence to convict the Comissos, its bosses were arrested by the RCMP in 1982. They were charged with conspiracy to commit murder. On November 14, 1983, Paul Volpe was found dead in the trunk of his wife's BMW at Toronto Pearson International Airport. He had been killed the previous day.
1984	Napanee Jane Doe	16–25 (estimate)	Napanee	Ontario	The corpse of an unidentified white female between the ages of 18 and 25 years old was found in a ditch along a rural highway near Napanee, Ontario on December 30, 1984. It is believed that she was not a local resident, but had been murdered elsewhere, possibly in Quebec, and dumped at this location.
1985	Franklin Dimitrios Shoofey	44	Montreal	Quebec	Shoofey, a prominent criminal defense lawyer in Canada, was gunned down outside his Montreal law office on Cherrier Street. The hit was carried out in a professional manner. Just shortly after his death, the Montreal Gazette received a phone call from a male individual who claimed to be affiliated with a terrorist group known as the Red Army Liberation Front. He spoke on behalf of the organization, proudly announcing that he and his "colleagues" were responsible for Shoofey's assassination. On the contrary, a representative for the Canadian Security Intelligence Service suggested that the call may have simply been an attempt to throw-off the investigation, as this was the first that authorities had ever heard of such a group. A prominent theory regarding the Frank Shoofey homicide case names mobsters as the ones responsible for the crime. At the time of his death, Shoofey had reportedly been involved in a dispute with Cotroni crime family kingpin Frank Cotroni over the interests of Montreal boxer Dave Hilton Sr.
1986	Elaine Krausher	26	near Cochrane	Alberta	On July 19, 1986, Elaine Krausher's body was discovered lying on the bank of the Jumping Pound Creek near Cochrane.
1986	Mary Ann Birmingham	15	Iqaluit	Nunavut	Mary Ann's body was found in her home in Iqaluit, Nunavut on May 28, 1986.
1986	Kerrie Ann Brown	15	Thompson	Manitoba	On October 16, 1986, Kerrie Ann Brown disappeared from a house party. Her corpse was found sexually assaulted in a wooded area on the outskirts of Thompson on October 18.
1986	Melodie Riegel	19	Edmonton	Alberta	On September 21, 1986, Riegel was found strangled to death at the Pan-American motel. The room she was found in was registered to a "Bruce Stevens" of Grande Prairie, but this is believed by the police to be an alias.
1987	Naomi Leigh Desjarlais	21	Regina	Saskatchewan	Naomi's nude body was found on March 27, 1987, in a ditch near the city dump. She had been shot.
1987	Lyette Gibb	18	Laval	Quebec	Eighteen-year-old Lyette Gibb was last seen at 1:50 am on April 25, 1987, after leaving a friend's house in Notre-Dame Street, Laval. Her remains were discovered on October 25, 1987, in L'Assomption.
1988	Chantal Rochon	17	Blainville	Quebec	Chantal Rochon had last been seen on June 11, 1988, near her home. She was reported missing on June 15, and her remains were founded in a wooded area in Blainville on June 22.
1988	Mary O'Donnell	53	Vancouver	British Columbia	On July 28, 1988, Mary O'Donnell was heading back to her home from an A&W Restaurant when she was robbed and beaten to death by an unidentified assailant. Her remains would later surface on the premises of Templeton Secondary School.
1988	Byron Carr	36	Charlottetown	Prince Edward Island	A high school teacher named Byron Howard Carr was strangled to death in his home on November 11, 1988 just after 3 a.m., with the killer leaving a note behind reading: "I will kill again". To this day, his death remains the most puzzling, unsolved case in Prince Edward Island.
1988	Debbie Faye Pelletier	27	Regina	Saskatchewan	Debbie was found stabbed to death in a house in Regina on December 25, 1988.
1989	James "Jim" Allan Killam	39	Saint John	New Brunswick	Jim Killam disappeared from his home on May 15, 1989 in Saint John after getting in his car and leaving everything behind. In the past, he had disappeared two years prior, ultimately being found at his sister's house around two weeks later in Calgary, Alberta. His remains were found by hunters on November 19, 1991, in a wooded area located east from Saint John, in the Quispamsis region.
1989	Michael Masson	27	Medicine Hat	Alberta	On June 5, 1989, Michael Masson checked into the Hat Motel, left within two hours of checking in, and never returned. On July 31, 1989, his decomposed body was found in a shallow grave just south of Medicine Hat.
1989	Valérie Dalpé	13	Montreal	Quebec	Found murdered and dismembered on October 19, 1989.
1990	Leah Salina Sousa	13	Cumberland Beach	Ontario	Shortly after midnight on September 1, 1990, an intruder broke into the home of the Sousa family while the household was asleep. The unidentified trespasser first entered the room of 39-year-old Lora Sousa, violently beating her into a state of unconsciousness before approaching the couch where 13-year-old Leah Salina Sousa was sleeping. Leah was then raped and dragged outside to the backyard of the house, where she was fatally bludgeoned with a blunt object. The family's 9-month-old baby, Michael Sousa, was also present at the scene but left unharmed in his crib. While Lora survived the attack, she was unable to recall any details of the incident, as a result of her sustained head trauma.
1990	Henri Léger	70	Haute-Aboujagane	New Brunswick	On the evening of November 28, 1990, two armed and masked men forcibly entered Henri's home. Henri was with his wife, Eveline Leger, and Sophie Leger, all of whom were senior citizens. Eveline and Sopher were tied up while Henri was severely beaten. The men sacked the home and left with an undisclosed amount of money. Henri never regained consciousness, and died in August 1993.
1990	Alfred and Dolores Palmer	71 & 35	Medicine Hat	Alberta	On December 30, 1990, Alfred Palmer and his daughter-in-law, Dolores Palmer, were found west of Medicine Hat, having been shot with a .410 shotgun.
1991	Cartierville John Doe	30–49 (estimate)	Montreal	Quebec	On March 1, 1991, the remains of a naked unidentified male who had sustained traumatic injuries were discovered in Parc de Louisbourg in the Cartierville suburb of northern Montreal. The victim's hands had been severed, and he had been stabbed 127 times in various parts of his body, including his face and penis.
1991	Glenda Morrisseau	19	Winnipeg	Manitoba	On 17 July 1991, Glenda Morrisseau, originally from the Sagkeeng First Nation, disappeared after a night out with her sister, mother, and stepfather. She was last seen getting into a dark-coloured station wagon with a middle-aged man. Her body was found on 7 August near the Seine River in St. Boniface, naked from the waist down with her hands tied behind her back. The cause of death was determined to be blunt force trauma to the head. Morrisseau's niece, Kelly Morriseau, would also be killed in an unsolved murder in 2006.
1991	Asau Tran	38	Toronto	Ontario	Vietnamese mobster Asau "Johnny" Tran was fatally shot, along with his girlfriend, outside a Dundas St restaurant in downtown Toronto on August 16, 1991. While his killer has never been named, his death was thought to be caused by a turf war between Vietnamese gangs, as it was one of more than 10 murders at Chinese and Vietnamese restaurants that summer.
1991	Lori Pinkus	21	Toronto	Ontario	While working in the area of Bloor Street and Lansdowne Avenue on the early morning of September 8, 1991, 21-year-old Lori Pinkus was assaulted, strangled, and left suffering from medical distress in the car lot of Brockton High School by an unknown assailant. After being alerted by a caretaker who discovered her, paramedics arrived at the scene and attempted to save her life but were unsuccessful in doing so.
1992	Marie-Ève Larivière	11	Laval	Quebec	On March 7, 1992, Marie-Ève was found strangled and sexually assaulted. Her clothed body was found beside a railroad track, in the industrial area in Chomedey, about 7 km from where she went missing.
1992	Cindy Laura Halliday	17	Elmvale	Ontario	Cindy Halliday was reported missing to police on Easter Weekend, April 21, 1992. Her skeletal remains were found on June 16, 1992 in a reforestation area in Flos Township. Cindy was last seen in Barrie Ontario and was known to be planning to hitchhike back to her home town of Waverly ON on the evening of April 20, 1992.
1992	Mariella Lennie	17	Great Slave Lake	Northwest Territories	Mariella Lennie was last seen on October 6, 1991, leaving the Discovery Inn on 50 Avenue. Twelve days later, she was reported missing. Her body was found floating on Great Slave Lake near the now-defunct Con Mine on May 8, 1992. Very little information about this case is available to the public. Police are quoted as saying that "suspicious death, foul play has not been eliminated." Lennie had a four-month-old baby at the time, who she had left at home with her parents in Tulita. Mariella is one of many Indigenous women who went missing or was murdered in and around Yellowknife during this period.
1993	Sheila McIndoe Henry	26	Vancouver	British Columbia	Sheila McIndoe Henry's body was found by her husband, David, in their Kitsilano home at about 8 pm on February 5, 1993. David is the primary suspect in her murder.
1993	Jillian Blatchford Fuller	28	Vancouver	British Columbia	In the early morning of March 4, 1993, an individual delivering newspapers contacted emergency services to report an active apartment fire. Vancouver Fire Department personnel were subsequently dispatched to the scene, where they discovered the remains of 28-year-old tenant Jillian Blatchford Fuller after extinguishing the flames. The victim's death was found to be a homicide, and that her apartment was set ablaze in an attempt to conceal the crime. Fuller had last been seen alive at the Fraser Arms Hotel (a bar inside the Rock Cellar Pub) by a waitress working there. The waitress told investigators that Jillian had made contact with a man that evening, and the two agreed to meet up later at her apartment. This individual has not since been identified, but is considered an important person of interest.
1993	Dino Bravo	44	Laval	Quebec	Italian Canadian professional wrestler Adolfo Bresciano, better known by his stage name Dino Bravo, was killed in his home by multiple gunshots on March 10, 1993.
1993	Shelley Denise Connors	17	Halifax	Nova Scotia	On June 1, 1993, Shelley's body was found about 200 yards from the Spryfield Lyons Rink at 25 Drysdale Road. She had disappeared from her home on May 29.
1994	Melanie Cabay	19	Mascouche	Quebec	Melanie was found in a wooded area by an off-road motorcyclist near Mascouche, about 25 km from Montreal on July 5, 1994. She was naked, and her body was too decomposed to make a positive identification. She had been strangled and struck on the head. It was not possible to determine if she had been sexually assaulted.
1994	Mindy Tran	8	Kelowna	British Columbia	Mindy Tran disappeared in August 1994 while riding her bike in her Kelowna neighbourhood. Her body was found in a shallow grave in a nearby park in October 1994. She had been sexually assaulted and strangled. A neighbour, Shannon Murrin, was charged with her murder but acquitted in January 2000.
1995	Diane Dobson	36	Windsor	Ontario	Diane Dobson was last seen in the late afternoon of February 14, 1995, after leaving home. Her body was found at 8:30 am the next day by a Windsor municipal worker at Brighton Beach. Cause of death was blunt force trauma from multiple blows to the head with a heavy object, and there were indications Dobson had been murdered elsewhere and the body subsequently dumped where it was found. A police investigation cleared both Dobson's boyfriend and ex-husband. The primary crime scene was never determined.
1995	Ramona Lisa Wilson	16	Smithers	British Columbia	On April 9, 1995, Wilson's body was found in a bush area near the Smithers Airport.
1995	Nola Belisle	37	Regina	Saskatchewan	While participating in a charity walk from Moose Jaw to Regina on May 18, 1995, a truck speeding on the Trans-Canada Highway struck Nola Belisle with its side-view mirror. She was immediately propelled into a roadside ditch as the driver continued on. Her accompanying companion, Laurie Acott, quickly sought for help. Right after the accident had occurred, the truck was reported to have allegedly pulled in front of a motor coach that had been serving as an escort for the pair. Suddenly, after coming to a brief stop, it fled the scene. Nola Belisle was promptly rushed to the closest hospital, where she would die as a result of the severe injuries she had sustained from the traffic collision. The driver of the truck responsible for Belisle's death has never come forward or been identified.
1995–1996	Mary Lidguerre	30	Mount Seymour	British Columbia	Mary Lidguerre disappeared from Vancouver's Downtown East Side in July 1995. Her skeletal remains were discovered on Mount Seymour in August 1996, she was not identified until 1997. Mary was a sex worker and drug addict. Her case has been linked by some officials to "The Hemlock Valley Murders".
1995	Chantel Gillade	28	Vancouver	British Columbia	Construction workers found Chantel's body at their worksite behind 826 Homer Street on the morning of September 1, 1995. Chantel was a transgender sex worker, who had been going through sex reassignment surgery at the time of her death. According to another sex worker, Chantel's last client had picked her up at 4 am in a black pick-up truck with a canopy, tinted windows, and a red stripe painted on the side of the canopy. There is a possibility that the murder was a hate crime.
1995	Craig Abrahams	28	Vancouver	British Columbia	Craig's body was discovered by his neighbour on December 21, 1995. It is believed that Craig was selling cocaine from his apartment.
1996	Samuel Lottery	17	London	Ontario	Samuel was reported missing to London Police Service on January 19, 1996. In March 1996, a letter was found at the Pillar of Fire Church. The letter contained information about Sam, as well as a picture of him that had been in his wallet. In November 1996, another letter arrived at Samuel's parents' home. In May 1997, human bones were located along the Thames River south of Blackfriars Bridge. In November 2003, a human jawbone was located near the same location. In April 2008, a human skull was found on the bank of the Thames River.
1996	David Jon Malloy	44	North Vancouver	British Columbia	Taxi driver David Malloy was attacked by his passenger on March 17, 1996 and later was found lying in the alley in the 700 Blk. of West 20th Street suffering from multiple stab wounds. His cab and wallet had been stolen by the individual who stabbed him. He succumbed to his injuries two days later on March 19.
1996	Jane and Cathryn Johnson	36 & 8	Turner Valley	Alberta	Jane Johnson, along with her daughter, Cathryn, were murdered in their home on the evening of September 3, 1996. The culprit(s) set fire to the residence in an effort to conceal the crime. According to the RCMP, these killings were likely committed by an individual, or individuals, who had been acquainted with the victims, and was aware of their routinely day-to-day patterns.
1996	Bao Manh Le	27	Toronto	Ontario	A shooting occurred on October 28, 1996, on Carlaw Avenue, and Bao Manh Le was pronounced dead at the scene. The gunman and the motive for the crime remain unknown.
1997-1998	Temistocle Casas, also known as the Conception Bay John Doe	late 30s to early 40s	Conception Bay	Newfoundland and Labrador	In 2001, a severed head was found at a dump site in Conception Bay, near St. John's, Newfoundland. Examination of the skull indicated the victim was male, between the ages of 20 and 40, and had shoulder length curly black hair. Isotope and carbon dating analysis indicated the unidentified victim was probably born in the late 1950s or early 1960s and had spent time in Ontario and Quebec. The rest of the body was never found. In April 2024, a DNA match with a first cousin was found using genetic geneaology. The victim was subsequently identified as Temistocle Casas, a Cuban national who arrived in Canada on a tourist visa on 1 April 1992.
1997	Scott Steinert	35	St. Lawrence River	Quebec	American-born outlaw biker and prominent member of the Hells Angels Montreal chapter, Scott Steinert was last seen alive on the evening of November 4, 1997, when his presence (along with his bodyguard: Donald "Bam Bam" Magnusen) was requested at a meeting initiated by the gang's top-ranking national leaders. He was said to have departed for the meeting but never returned. On April 15, 1999, his corpse was discovered in the St. Lawrence Seaway, after it had floated to the surface. Examination of Steinert's corpse revealed that he had been tortured and bludgeoned to death.
1997	Lorraine McNab and Peter Sopow	47 & 52	Pincher Creek	Alberta	Lorraine McNab, a kindergarten teacher along with her boyfriend, Peter Sopow, an RCMP sergeant were both murdered outside of their house on December 13, 1997. After returning home from a family dinner, the culprit(s) shot at both of them, killing them on the spot. 36 hours later, an RCMP forensic unit member found their bodies inside a horse trailer on their yard. To this day, their murders still remain unsolved, and their killers were never found, nor was the weapon.
1998	Tara Singh Hayer	62	Surrey	British Columbia	Indo-Canadian newspaper publisher Tara Singh Hayer was killed via gunshot while getting out of his car in the garage of his residency on November 18, 1998. It was later determined that Hayer was murdered after reporting about terrorism, as this had not been the first attempt on his life.
1998	Bindy Johal	27	Vancouver	British Columbia	Bhupinder "Bindy" Singh Johal was an Indo-Canadian mobster and drug trafficker with connections to the criminal underworld of British Columbia. On December 20, 1998, he was shot behind the right ear while on the dance floor of the Palladium nightclub.
1999	Cathy Berard	61	Vancouver	British Columbia	A jogger found Cathy, bleeding and unconscious, at David Thompson Secondary School on July 5, 1996. She had been beaten and sexually assaulted. Cathy died on January 2, 1999.
1999	Raymond Paul Chase	34	Dartmouth	Nova Scotia	Dartmouth resident Raymond Paul Chase was shot in his vehicle as he pulled into the driveway of his residence at Cole Harbour on May 13, 1999. Chase had been a known drug dealer who was reportedly associated with outlaw motorcycle clubs, including the notorious Hells Angels. It is still unknown who gunned him down, or the motive, but the homicide may have been gang-related or connected to organized crime.
1999	Richard Chacon	31	Vancouver	British Columbia	On July 25, 1999, Richard Chacon attempted to break up a fight between two men outside of The Car Wash, an after-hours nightclub, of which he was the manager. A gunshot rang out, and one of the men involved in the fight was shot in the stomach, rendering him paralyzed. Richard was also shot by the same bullet, and later died from his injuries. It is unknown who had shot the two men.
1999	Jason MacCullough	19	Dartmouth	Nova Scotia	On August 28, 1999, Jason MacCullough was shot in the back of the head at near-point-blank range while walking to his parents' home after a party.

=== 21st century ===
Year	Victim(s)	Age	Location	Province	Notes
2000	Ruben Grant	19	Etobicoke	Ontario	On April 5, 2000, police responded to a shooting, and found Ruben outside a residence with gunshot wounds to the neck. It was suggested by a Toronto Star article that Grant, a member of the Crips gang, died because he didn't properly avenge a shooting in north Etobicoke that left another Crip paralyzed.
2000	Hani Othman	16	Rexdale	Ontario	Hani Otham was shot outside a townhouse complex on John Garland Boulevard on April 23, 2000. Police suspect the shooting may have been gang related, as Othman had friends in the Crips gang.
2000	André Desjardins	69	Montreal	Quebec	On the morning of April 27, André Desjardins was shot 11 times in his back, just moments after departing from a popular restaurant in Montreal. In the years leading up to his death, Desjardins had become one of the leading (and most successful) loan sharks in the city, with strong ties to organized crime. There is widespread speculation that Desjardins' assassin had been a member of the local Hells Angels chapter in Quebec, or possibly a member of the Rock Machine. On the morning of his death, Desjardins had been scheduled to meet with Quebec chapter president, Maurice Boucher to discuss business matters. Boucher, however, did not show up. Prior to the murder of Desjardins, Boucher had apparently asked him to "forgive" a $400,000 loan with 52% interest that had been taken out by a friend of Boucher's. Failing to be intimidated by the notorious biker, Desjardins angrily refused to excuse the loan. As Boucher continued to ominously insist that the loan be forgiven, Desjardins told Boucher that he did not take orders from the Hells Angels, and reminded him that he had powerful friends in the Mafia, the police, and in Quebec politics, saying he was not afraid of Boucher at all. Following this brief argument between the two, Boucher asked Desjardins to meet him the following day for breakfast to further discuss the matter. Desjardins agreed, but Boucher did not show up as he had planned. It was on the same morning that André Desjardins had been murdered.
2000	Patricia "Patty" Real	46	Etobicoke	Ontario	On the evening of July 18, 2000, Real and her boyfriend had just arrived home when an unknown intruder came up behind them and shot Real in the head. Her boyfriend struggled with the man, but he got away on his bicycle.
2000	Gaetano "Guy" Panepinto	41	Toronto	Ontario	Gaetano Panepinto was a Toronto mobster and funeral home owner, who was attempting to distance himself from organized crime. He was shot and killed on October 3, 2000. The murder of his alleged lover, Patricia Real, occurred in the same year, and also remains unsolved.
2001	Gavin Hunter	22	Toronto	Ontario	Gavin Hunter was found dead in a car after being shot. He was a suspect in the murders of Craig Palmer and Tyrone King a year prior.
2001	David Buller	50	Toronto	Ontario	David was found murdered in his office at the University of Toronto on January 18, 2001. The case is unresolved.
2001	Gary Meier	52	Lacombe County	Alberta	Gary Meier was a wealthy auctioneer. On August 10, 2001 he was found shot to death in his house. Despite 40 leads according the RCMP at the time, the case has never been solved.
2001	Sudarsan "Maudo" Velauthapillai	21	Etobicoke	Ontario	Sudarsan Velauthapillai was shot and killed in his driveway on October 1, 2001. An unidentified man, described as Sri Lankan, fled from the scene. In March 2002, police developed a DNA profile that they believe belongs to the killer.
2001	Cecil Hinds	33	Rexdale	Ontario	Cecil Hinds was a pharmacist who had immigrated to Canada from Guyana in 1982 with his six older siblings and his mother. The family initially lived in Rexdale, but later moved to Woodbridge, Ontario, to escape the violence of the neighbourhood. A few years after living in Woodbridge, Hinds returned to his former neighbourhood in Rexdale for a visit. While sitting with a friend after watching a basketball game, three youths wearing ski masks came running from around the corner and opened fire. As Hinds dove for cover, he was hit by gunfire and pronounced dead at the scene. The young perpetrators were gang members who commenced the shooting as part of a conflict between the Mount Olive Crips and Jamestown Crips. Investigators believe that Hinds' killing was due to mistaken identification.
2001–2002	Laura Lee Cross	33–34	Dartmouth	Nova Scotia	Initially having been reported as missing over a year earlier, the skeletal remains of Dartmouth woman Laura Lee Cross were recovered in late 2002.
2002	Donna Marie Kasyon	20	Saskatoon	Saskatchewan	Donna Marie Kasyon was stabbed to death at a Saskatoon bus stop by an unknown assailant.
2002	Shizuo Kado	98	Burnaby	British Columbia	On or around September 9, 2002, Shizuo Kado and his 94-year-old wife, Tokuyo, were assaulted at their home by person(s) who unlawfully entered the residence.
2002	Phouvong Phommaviset	26	Richmond	British Columbia	Phommaviset's charred remains were found on January 2, 2002, by the Fraser River. At the time of his death, he was a suspect in the abduction of Ned Mander on October 9, 2001.
2002	John Francis Alquiros	31	Timberlea	Nova Scotia	Thirty-one-year-old John Alquiros was killed via bullet wounds he sustained after being shot at by an unknown gunman (or gunmen). On the late morning of April 19, 2002, three youths stumbled upon his body while walking in the rural area of the Greenhead Road extension off Nova Scotia Highway 103 in Timberlea. The Halifax RCMP were able to determine that the site where Alquiros was found is also the same location where the fatal shooting took place.
2004	Shana Lee Labatte	30	Kelowna	British Columbia	Shana's body was found in Mission Flats Park on the morning of March 23, 2004. She was a prostitute in the area.
2004	Janine René Wesaquate-Oakes	20	Regina	Saskatchewan	The charred remains of Janine René Wesaquate-Oakes were discovered in a burned-out house, which police speculate had been deliberately set on fire. It has been suggested that Janine's murder may have been connected to street gang activity in the area—specifically, a notorious Indigenous-based organized crime group known as the Native Syndicate.
2005	Sherri Lee Hiltz	44	Kamloops	British Columbia	In the spring of 2005, a dead body was spotted in the backyard of a vacant lot located within the 800 block of Surrey Avenue. Using the forensic science technique of dactyloscopy (fingerprint identification) would soon reveal to pathologists that the corpse belonged to 44-year-old Sherri Lee Hiltz. Hiltz, a recovering drug addict, was known to work in the sex trade. Investigators have concluded that Hiltz was the victim of foul play, as her body had been severely beaten.
2005	Samantha Tayleen Berg	19	Edmonton	Alberta	Samantha's body was found frozen under a pile of snow in a parking lot known for prostitution. In December 2003, Samantha had registered with Project Kare. She provided them with a photo and contact information, in the event that she went missing or was found dead.
2005	Leon Anthony Adams	32	Halifax	Nova Scotia	On May 22, 2005, Leon Anthony Adams had been found lying in a hallway in his home, after being shot. He was pronounced dead upon arrival at the hospital. His murder remains unsolved.
2005	Cynthia Kudjick	35	Montreal	Quebec	Cynthia Kudjick was found on January 3, 2005. She had been savagely beaten and left for dead on the street. She was found unconscious on the sidewalk by EMTs who took her to the hospital, where she died soon after. She was considered the first Indigenous female murder victim of 2005.
2005	Melissa Ivy Chaboyer	35	Thompson	Manitoba	The body of Melissa Ivy Chaboyer, a part-time taxi driver, was discovered beside her cab in the City Centre Mall parking lot, after being stabbed by her two passengers who fled on foot.
2005	Melanie Dawn Geddes	24	Regina	Saskatchewan	The skeletal remains of Melanie Geddes were discovered in a field 50 kilometres north of Regina, approximately four months after she had gone missing. Geddes, a First Nations mother of three, had been last seen alive leaving a house party that was only a short walk from her residence.
2006	Kelly Morrisseau	27	Gatineau	Quebec	On 10 December 2006, Kelly Morrisseau, originally from Manitoba's Sagkeeng First Nation, was found in a Gatineau Park parking lot bleeding from multiple stab wounds. The 7-months-pregnant mother of three died shortly after arriving at hospital. Less than two hours before being found in Gatineau, Morrisseau had been seen in Vanier getting into a car with an unidentified man, possibly to exchange sexual favours. Police released a composite sketch of the man who remains the main suspect of the murder. Morrisseau's aunt, Glenda, was also killed in an unsolved murder in 1991.
2006	Evan Garber	59	Vancouver	British Columbia	On the early morning of April 28, 2006, an unknown male armed with a handgun walked into a packed restaurant and robbed the establishment. When the robber tried to leave, Evan Garber and one other patron confronted the robber and a struggle ensued, resulting in several shots fired. Garber was shot and killed while five other restaurant patrons were injured.
2006–2007	Marie Lynn Lasas	19	Saskatoon	Saskatchewan	Marie went missing on her way home on September 21, 2006. Her body was found 9 months later, under a pile of wood pallets behind an abandoned house on the south side of Saskatoon.
2007	Glenn Brian Bourgeois	37	Halifax	Nova Scotia	Halifax Regional Police were sent to investigate the area of Maynard and Woodill Street after gunshots were reported within its vicinity. The officers arrived at the location to discover Glenn Bourgeois suffering from multiple gunshot wounds that would end up being fatal. Two African-Canadian teenagers were witnessed fleeing the scene, one of them wielding a firearm. These individuals have not since been identified, but remain significant persons of interest.
2007	Diane Gloria Paul	54	Dauphin	Manitoba	Diane Gloria Paul, the late wife of former Dauphin two-term mayor Alex Paul, was shot and killed inside the home they shared. Although initially thought to have been a case of suicide, an autopsy revealed to investigators that she had been murdered.
2007	Angel Edna Carlick	19–20	Whitehorse	Yukon	Angel Carlick was last seen on May 27, 2007, at a celebratory barbecue, not long before her graduation ceremony. On November 9, 2007, a hiker found Angel's body in a wooded area in Pilot Mountain, near Whitehorse, 5½ months after she went missing. The search for Angel didn't begin for weeks, as the RCMP believed that she was a runaway. The results of her autopsy were inconclusive, and investigators were unable to determine the cause of death.
2007	Eric Boateng	21	Toronto	Ontario	Eric Boateng had visited an inmate at the Don Jail, and while he was returning to his parked car, he was shot and killed. He had a history of trouble with the law.
2007	Fonessa Lynn Louise Bruyere	17	Winnipeg	Manitoba	Fonessa Bruyere was a First Nations teenager who was working as a prostitute in the Winnipeg area at the time of her death. She had last been seen alive getting into a green, two-door truck with tinted windows—presumably, a curb crawler who was soliciting her sexual services. Over the course of the following two weeks, she was neither seen nor heard from. Her remains were located at the edge of city limits.
2008	Brianna Danielle Torvalson	21	Edmonton	Alberta	The body of Brianna Danielle Torvalson was discovered in a rural area of Strathcona County, East of Edmonton.
2008	Lindsay Buziak	24	Saanich	British Columbia	Lindsay Buziak, a real estate agent, was stabbed to death after being lured to an empty home by a couple posing as prospective buyers. She had been stabbed over 40 times in the head and chest.
2008	Willene Wah Ying Chong	76	Vancouver	British Columbia	While asleep in her bed in the early hours of September 11, 2008, an arsonist set fire to the home of Willene Chong. She had succumbed to the severe burns that she sustained in the fire. Vancouver Police Department investigators have noted that a number of fires in the vicinity had been set that same morning. The police are currently searching for a group of unidentified youths who were spotted around Ms. Chong's house and the scenes of the other fires.
2008	Jaumar "Maury" Carvery	21	Halifax	Nova Scotia	At 12:08 am on May 3, 2008, police officers heard gunshots near Sunrise Walk and Olympic Court in north Halifax. They found 21-year-old Jaumar Carvery, who had been shot. He was rushed to the hospital, where he succumbed to his injuries.
2009	Sherri Leigh Green	39	Wasagaming	Manitoba	Sherri's body was found at the family cabin on September 17, 2009, by one of her sisters and her brother-in-law.
2009	Tanya Jean Brooks	36	Halifax	Nova Scotia	Tanya's remains were found beside the former St. Patrick's-Alexandra School on Maitland Street in Halifax on May 11, 2009. Investigators believe that Tanya knew her assailant(s).
2009	Cherisse Diane Marie Houle	17	Sturgeon Creek	Manitoba	The First Nations mother of an 18-month-old son, Cherisse Diane Marie Houle was last seen in Winnipeg on May 25, 2009, before disappearing without a trace. On July 1 of that same year, her remains were found in Sturgeon Creek. Houle's death was ruled as a homicide, and is undergoing investigation.
2010	Nicolo Rizzuto	86	Montreal	Quebec	Godfather of the notorious Rizzuto crime family. Shot dead by an unidentified assailant while in his Cartierville residence.
2010	Albert Kiwubeyi	24	Toronto	Ontario	On the early morning of October 25, 2010, Albert Kiwubeyi was found on the sidewalk with a gunshot wound to the chest in Toronto's Regent Park neighborhood. He was pronounced dead at the scene.
2010	Amber Tuccaro	20	Edmonton	Alberta	A First Nations woman who was last seen accepting a ride from an unidentified male. Tuccaro intended to hitchhike from Nisku to Edmonton, but police believe her driver took her to rural Leduc County. Her body was found in Leduc County in 2012. The driver has never been identified, and the case remains unsolved.
2010	Sultan Dailey	20	Parkdale	Ontario	Sultan Dailey was found in the Close Avenue Parkette, near Queen Victoria Junior Public School. The crime is believed by police to be related to the drug trade. Dailey had previously been in trouble with the law.
2011	Paul Frappier (Bad News Brown)	33	Montreal	Quebec	Rapper Paul Frappier, better known by his stage name Bad News Brown, was found murdered near the Lachine Canal in southwest Montreal. Local police say that he had sustained injuries to his head with "clear signs of violence" on his upper body. So far, no arrests have been made, and the motive for the killing is unknown.
2011	Casey Armstrong	48	Medicine Hat	Alberta	On May 22, 2011, Armstrong was found stabbed to death in a bathtub in his trailer. Two women, Connie Oakes and Wendy Scott, were convicted of the murder in 2012. In 2016, the convictions were overturned, with Connie Oakes suing the Medicine Hat Police Service in 2018 for the wrongful conviction. Since then there has been no progress in the case.
2011	Nathan Ross Cross	21	North Preston	Nova Scotia	On April 28, 2011, Nathan Ross Cross was found unconscious, after having been shot, and later died in hospital. While its believed by police that Nathan and a group of individuals were ambushed by the gunman, the events, the perpetrator, and the motive are still unknown.
2011	Graham Thomas and Jason Chapman	35 & 31	Ottawa	Ontario	Convicted felon Graham Thomas and Jason Chapman were left for dead in a pool of blood as they were closing up shop at Caribbean Exposure tanning salon in the Gloucester Centre. The shootings appeared carefully orchestrated, with a gunman walking into the mall at closing time surrounded by few witnesses, and making a speedy getaway out of an emergency exit door. Police seized $15 million in drugs linked to the double murder a year later.
2012	Bernadine Leanne Quewezance	36	Saskatchewan Highway 16	Saskatchewan	Bernadine Quewezance's body was found in a ditch beside a service road near Highway 16, about two kilometres outside of Saskatoon. She had been living with friends at the time of her death, and had five children.
2012	Ranjit Cheema	43	Vancouver	British Columbia	In May 2012, Indo-Canadian gangster Ranjit Singh Cheema was killed in a targeted drive-by shooting.
2012	Hazel Lloyd	94	Medicine Hat	Alberta	On August 29, 2012, the Medicine Hat Fire Department responded to a fire at an apartment. Inside the apartment, 94 year-old Hazel Lloyd's body was found, having died from blunt force trauma prior to the fire. Despite a $10,000 reward from the Medicine Hat Police Service, the murder has remained unsolved.
2013	Salvatore Calautti	42	Vaughan	Ontario	'Ndrangheta hitman Salvatore "Sam" Calautti was shot dead outside of a bachelor party.
2013	Lisa Ann Zielke Elick	41	Surrey	British Columbia	Lisa Ann Zielke Elick's body was found near Hi-Knoll Park on October 31, 2013. She was a sex worker and a drug addict.
2014	Tina Fontaine	15	Winnipeg	Manitoba	Tina Fontaine was a First Nations teenage youth who initially went missing multiple times throughout the early month of August 2014, but was later found deceased. She was last seen alive accompanying an individual who was soliciting a sex act from her. Fontaine's body was later found at the bottom of the Red River.
2014	Allan Donald Waugh	69	Whitehorse	Yukon	Allan was found deceased in his home on May 30, 2014. Police determined that he was murdered by someone who had entered his home in the night.
2016	Christian Saarah	28	Rexdale	Ontario	Christian Saraah was killed in a targeted drive-by shooting; his brother was also shot, and was rushed to hospital in life-threatening condition. Although police speculate that Christian had gotten into an argument or altercation with an unidentified person or group of people, it is unknown who shot him and his brother, or what the motive was.
2017	Barry and Honey Sherman	75 & 69	Toronto	Ontario	Barry and Honey Sherman were found dead in their Toronto mansion on December 15, 2017. They were hanging by belts from a railing surrounding their indoor pool. The couple was among Canada's most generous philanthropists. It has been suggested by Honey's sister that the murder might be religiously motivated, as the Shermans' were strong supporters of Israel, and very vocal about being Jewish.
2017	Michael Widner	39	Port Renfrew	British Columbia	The body of Michael Widner, a prospect for the Nanaimo chapter of the Hells Angels Motorcycle Club, was discovered near Port Renfrew in March 2017. Widner's homicide is believed to have been an assassination, due to his involvement with the Hells Angels and organized crime.
2017	Clayton Benoit	51	Whitehorse	Yukon	Clayton Benoit had been rushed to Whitehorse General Hospital, where he later succumbed to his injuries. An autopsy later revealed his death to have been a homicide. Clayton was originally from Northwest Territories, and was believed to have been living in Yukon for some time.
2020	O'Neill-Cius Williams	23	Montreal	Quebec	Longtime West Island resident O'Neill-Cius Williams was using drugs with another 23-year-old man in a parked vehicle in Pierrefonds-Roxboro, when a car pulled up next to the pair and started shooting. Williams attempted to drive away, but crashed into a fence outside a house on Dauville Street. O'Neill-Cius Williams was later taken to a hospital, but died as a result of the wounds sustained in the shooting. The passenger who accompanied Williams was unharmed.
2021	Joshua Bennett	18	Kitchener	Ontario	Joshua Bennett, from Etobicoke, was found dead by Waterloo Regional Police near a trail around Paulander Drive in Kitchener on September 24, 2021. Police had responded to a call about an injured male in the area at approximately 4:30 a.m. Bennett's autopsy revealed that he had died from multiple stab wounds. On September 24, 2024, police announced a $50,000 reward for information leading to the conviction of the person or persons responsible for Bennett's fatal stabbing.
2023	Said Mohamed Ali and Abdishakur Abdi-Dahir	26 & 29	Ottawa	Ontario	On September 2, 2023, a mass shooting occurred outside the Infinity Convention Centre in Ottawa during a Somali wedding reception attended by approximately 200 guests. Gunfire erupted in the parking lot shortly after midnight, killing Toronto residents Said Mohamed Ali, 26, and Abdishakur Abdi-Dahir, 29, while injuring six others, including members of the wedding party. Police determined the attack was targeted but believe the deceased victims were innocent bystanders caught in the crossfire, possibly due to mistaken identity. The groom, Adam Abdullahi Elmi, was unharmed in the incident but was fatally shot in a separate homicide in July 2024.

== Multiple victims ==
Unsolved murder cases where numerous victims are tied to an event/pattern or series of events (e.g., mass murders, serial killings).

Year	Event	# of victims	Location	Province	Notes
1918	1918 Grande Prairie murders	6	Northwest of Grande Prairie	Alberta	Six men, four of whom were Eastern European immigrants, were murdered on two farms near Grande Prairie between June 18 and 20, 1918. Five were shot and one had his throat slit. Despite many suspects, and a trial in 1920, a lack of evidence led to no convictions ever being made. The victims were: Joseph Snyder - killed at the Snyder farm; Stanley Snyder - Joseph's nephew, also killed at the Snyder farm; Ignace Patan - a recent Polish immigrant who had moved from Illinois. Had his throat slashed at the Patan homestead; James Wudwand - a Russian immigrant who was working in Grande Prairie at a stable, found shot inside the house at the Patan homestead.; Charles Zimmer - a German trapper who had recently sold his house. Found dead in a wagon at the Patan homestead.; Frank Parzychowsky - a Ukrainian blacksmith who had moved from North Dakota. Found in the shed at the Patan homestead.
1924	Canadian Pacific Railway train bombing	9	Columbia and Western Railway	British Columbia	On the early morning of October 29, 1924, an explosion on the remote Kettle Valley Railway in southeastern British Columbia ripped apart Canadian Pacific Railroad Car 1586, killing a total of 9 individuals, including: Peter Verigin (65); Verigin's female companion Marie Strelaeff (17); Grand Forks MLA John McKie; P.J Campbell; Hakim Singh; Harry J. Bishop; W. J. Armstrong; and Neil E. Armstrong. The government initially, during investigation, stated the crime was perpetrated by people within the Doukhobor community, while the Doukhobors suspected Canadian government involvement.
1968–1970	The Forest City Killer	8	London	Ontario	From the 1960s to the early 1970s, eight victims were found in and around the town of London, Ontario, Canada. One notable victim was 15-year-old Jackie English, who disappeared in October 1969, and was found in a creek five days after being reported missing. All eight murders remain unsolved.
1965	Canadian Pacific Air Lines Flight 21	52	100 Mile House	British Columbia	A scheduled domestic flight heading to Whitehorse, Yukon, exploded on July 8, 1965, killing all 52 passengers. This aviation incident was later discovered to have been caused by a bomb, and is considered to be one of Canada's largest unsolved mass murders. RCMP investigators believe that the perpetrator was one of four suspicious passengers on board, classifying it as a suicide attack.
1969–2011	Highway of Tears	18≥	Highway 16, between Prince George and Prince Rupert	British Columbia	The Highway of Tears is the informal nickname given to the transport corridor between the cities of Prince George and Prince Rupert in British Columbia. It is utilized in a particular context that is meant to pertain to the location's notoriety of being a frequent area where many Indigenous Canadian women have gone missing and/or have been murdered. These said occurrences have ultimately been grouped together as a single string of homicides, kidnappings, and disappearances.
1980–1981	Toronto hospital baby deaths	7≥	The Hospital for Sick Children (Toronto)	Ontario	At least seven babies mysteriously died in the years 1980 and 1981, in what was then believed to be a case of homicide.
1989	Jack family disappearance	4	Prince George	British Columbia	The Jack Family was offered employment at a logging ranch in the Cluculz Lake area by an unidentified man at a pub in Prince George. Since the family lacked a car, the man offered to drive them. The family was last seen on August 2, 1989 at 1:21 AM packing their belongings into the unidentified man's vehicle. Seven years later in 1996 a mysterious call made to the Vanderhoof Police Department implied that the family was deceased and buried at the ranch.: Ronald Jack (26); Doreen Ann Jack (26); Russell Jack (9); Ryan Jack (4)
1990–1993	Calgary prostitute murder victims	7	Calgary	Alberta	The murders of various sex workers in Calgary in the early 1990s led many to believe that a serial killer was at large. These victims were found individually in shallow graves throughout Calgary.: Jennifer Janz's (16) badly beaten body was found on August 13, 1991, in a shallow grave at a construction site along the Trans-Canada Highway, northwest of Calgary.; Rebecca Lynn Boutilier (20) disappeared on February 2, 1993, in Calgary, and her remains were found the next month on March 11.; Joanne Shaver (17) was murdered in January 1990; her body was found sexually assaulted and strangled. James Arthur Link was charged with first-degree murder, but was later acquitted.; Shawna Vanderbasch's (20) nude body was discovered on the morning of June 20, 1991, beside a rural road about 4.5 km (2.8 mi) from the Priddis turnoff north of Highway 22X.; Jennifer Joyes (17) disappeared in August 1991, and was found on October 6 in a shallow grave.; Keely Louise Pincott (29) was reported missing by her mother in November 1991. On March 10, 1992, Pincott's skeletal remains were found in a wooded area 2 km (1.2 mi) northeast of Cochrane, Alberta, off Highway 1A.; Tracy Maunder (26) disappeared on October 28, 1992, and was found three days later beaten and stabbed to death in a grassy field.; One possible suspect investigated in the Calgary murders was a pimp and convicted sex offender named Barry Thomas Niedermier from Lethbridge.
1995	Hemlock Valley Murders	3	East Vancouver	British Columbia	Three murder victims were discovered in East Vancouver in 1995, all of whom were prostitutes that had worked in the same area of Vancouver. The three had all been murdered the same way, and left in the same area.: Tracy Olajide (30) (aka Tracy Canfield): Olajide's nude body was found on August 12, on a trail adjacent to the Morris Valley logging road about 15 km (9 mi) north of the Lougheed Highway #7, Harrison Mills, near Agassiz.; Tammy Lee Pipe (24): Pipe's nude body was found on September 2 near Agassiz, in the middle of a side road in a remote wooded area about 10 km (6.2 mi) north of Highway 7.; Victoria Lynn Younker (35) (née Laham; aka Nicole Johnson or Nicole Joseph): Younker's nude and partially decomposed body was located on October 21 near Mission, about 36 km (22 mi) north of Highway 7. The body was found laying about 7.6 m (25 ft) down an embankment at the dead end of the logging spur road.; Police indefinitely jailed Ronald Richard McCauley, but had no physical evidence linking him to the murders. In 2001, police tested DNA samples, which did not match McCauley.
2004	Mirage Spa shooting	3	Markham	Ontario	On February 8, 2004, the bodies of Zhu Xia Lin (35), Yan Jun Liu (40), and Yan Walter Xiao Chen Zhang (40) were found bound and wrapped in sheets in the back of Zhang's red Ford Explorer, behind Victoria Square United Church at Woodbine Avenue and Elgin Mills Road. They had all been shot and killed at Mirage Spa, a Markham massage parlour, located at 7170 Warden Ave. York Regional Police believe Lin was the main target, and that Liu and Zhang were likely in the wrong place at the wrong time in the triple murder.
2008	Lunness Road shooting	3	Toronto	Ontario	On July 20, 2008, Adrian Inglis Bannerman (29), Aaron MacDonald (20), and Kurt Charles (27) were all shot and killed while driving in an SUV on nearby Lunness Road, in Etobicoke. The driver of the SUV abandoned the vehicle and fled on foot unharmed. Toronto Police suspect two or more gunmen were involved in the drive-by triple homicide, and believe they were members of an Etobicoke gang.
2010	Htoo-Maw Family murders	3	Regina	Saskatchewan	On August 6, 2010, the bodies of Gray Nay Htoo (30), Maw Maw (28), and Seven June Htoo (3) were discovered murdered in their home on Oakview Drive. The family had lived in Regina for nearly two years, and had formerly lived in a refugee camp in Thailand. Regina Police never released specific details about the triple murder.

== Solved cases ==
Initially unsolved cases which were subsequently solved, mostly as cold cases.

Year	Year Solved	Victim(s)	Age	Location	Province	Notes
1994	2023	Marie-Chantale Desjardins	10	Rosemère	Quebec	The body of 10-year-old Marie-Chantale Desjardins was located in the woods behind the Place Rosemère shopping centre. Police have ruled her death as a murder. Desjardins had last been seen alive on July 16 of that same year. On 12 December 2023, Réal Courtemanche, an inmate at federal medium-security prison La Macaza Institution, was arrested and charged with first-degree murder in the Desjardins case. The Sûreté du Québec announced the arrest and indicated that advanced forensic biology methods had led to the arrest 29 years after the murder.
1975	2023	Nation River Lady, subsequently identified as Jewell Parchman Langford	25–50 (estimate); 48 (confirmed by DNA identification)	Casselman	Ontario	On May 3, 1975, the body of an unidentified White woman was found floating along the Nation River. The autopsy report revealed that she had been strangled to death with coaxial cable television wire. Police suspected her body was thrown from the westbound lane of the Highway 417 bridge into the river. In September 2022, using DNA and genetic genealogy, the victim was identified as Jewell Parchman Langford, aged 48 at the time of her death, from Tennessee. Rodney Nichols, an acquaintance of Langford's in Montreal, now 81 and resident in Florida, was charged with her murder and an extradition request was pending as of July 2023. On 1 December 2023, Nichols was extradited to Canada to face charges in relation to the murder. On 1 April 2026, Nichols, suffering from dementia, was deemed unfit to stand trial due to ongoing cognitive decline. Nichols will be held for treatment in the forensic unit of the Royal Ottawa Mental Health Centre, under the jurisdiction of the Ontario Review Board, but due to his advanced age (83 in 2026) and deteriorating condition, is unlikely to ever be fit to stand trial.
1975	2023	Sharron Prior	16	Longueuil	Quebec	In 1975, Sharron Prior left her home on the evening of March 29 to meet some friends and her boyfriend at a nearby pizzeria. However, Sharron never arrived at the restaurant, and could not be located. Four days after her disappearance, her body was discovered in a beekeeper's field. In May 2023, DNA samples and genetic genealogy identified Prior's killer as Franklin Romine, a West Virginia man who died in 1982. Romine had been living in Montreal in 1975 and had a long list of criminal activity in Montreal and West Virginia.
1983	2023	Susan Tice and Erin Gilmour	45 & 22	Toronto	Ontario	Susan Tice was discovered by her brother, after having been sexually assaulted and stabbed to death in her own bed. A few months later, a short walk away from Tice's home, the body of Erin Gilmour was found having suffered the same trauma and injuries as Tice, also in her bed. Gilmour was the only daughter of David Gilmour, co-founder of Barrick Gold; David's business partner, Peter Munk, was the father of Erin's boyfriend. DNA tests in 2002 showed that the same person had killed both women. In November 2020, through genetic genealogy, police researchers successfully identified the great-grandparents of the unknown suspect. On 24 November 2022, police arrested Joseph George Sutherland (61) in Moosonee, Ontario. Sutherland was transferred to Toronto, where he faced two counts of first-degree murder in the Tice and Gilmour deaths. On 5 October 2023, Sutherland pleaded guilty to both murders.
2000	2022	Guylaine Potvin	19	Saguenay	Quebec	Cégep de Jonquière student Guylaine Potvin was found dead in the basement of her apartment on the morning of April 28, 2000. She shared the apartment with two fellow female students, who were not present on the night of her murder. On 12 October 2022, the Sûreté du Québec announced the arrest of Marc-André Grenon (47) on the charge of first-degree murder in the Potvin case. Grenon was also charged with attempted murder and assault in connection with two separate cases against female students in 2000. On 20 February 2024, Grenon was found guilty of first-degree murder and aggravated sexual assault.
2016	2023	Jennifer Hillier-Penney	38	St. Anthony	Newfoundland	Jennifer Hillier-Penney was last seen 30 November 2016 at her estranged husband's house in St. Anthony; she and her husband Dean Penney were separated and she had moved in with her father. She was watching her youngest daughter while her husband was duck hunting at the family cabin in Northwest Arm. The RCMP believe Hillier-Penney was murdered sometime after arriving at the house that night. Her body has never been found. On 15 December 2023, Dean Penney was arrested in Deer Lake, Newfoundland, and charged with first-degree murder in the disappearance of his wife. On 24 May 2026, after a lengthy trial, Penney was convicted of first-degree murder in the death his wife. Penney was convicted on the basis of two confessions given to undercover police officers in the course of a "Mr. Big" sting operation. He is scheduled for a sentencing hearing in November 2026, and faces a mandatory life sentence with no chance of parole for 25 years.
2008	2023	Lucas Shortreed	17	Alma	Ontario	On Thanksgiving weekend in 2008, Lucas Shortreed left a party in Alma, Ontario, to walk home. He was struck from behind by a 1995–1997 white Dodge Neon, and the unidentified driver fled the scene of the accident. Though they were unable to find the car, police believed that the driver was someone in the community. In September 2023, acting on a tip from the public, police searched the property of David and Anastasia Haliburton in Mapleton Township, near the scene of the accident; a white Dodge Neon was seized and the Haliburtons were arrested and charged in the death of Shortreed. The car had been hidden behind a false wall in a semi-trailer. In September 2024, David Haliburton pleaded guilty to charges of leaving the scene of an accident causing bodily harm or death, and obstructing justice; Anastasia Haliburton pleaded guilty to obstructing justice.
1976-1977	2024	Eva Dvorak, Patricia McQueen, Barbara Maclean and Melissa Rehorek	14, 14, 19 & 20	Calgary	Alberta	Classmates Eva Dvorak and Patricia McQueen, both 14, disappeared on or about February 15, 1976, near 9th Avenue and 12th Street S.E. in Calgary; the bodies of the two girls were found the following morning under the Happy Valley underpass, west of Calgary. On February 26, 1977, the body of Barbara Maclean (19) was found by a man walking along a gravel road near 80th Avenue and 6th Street NE. Barbara and her boyfriend had gotten into an argument on the evening of February 25, and he left her in the parking lot of a bar. Barbara decided to hitchhike to a party but never arrived. It was believed that the individual who gave Barbara a ride was responsible for her death, and that the same individual also killed Melissa Rehorek (20), who was found September 16, 1976, in a ditch along a gravel road about 20 km west of Calgary. On May 17, 2024, the Alberta RCMP announced that all four murders had been solved. DNA evidence found on all four bodies connected the murders to Gary Allen Srery, a serial killer and repeat sexual offender who died in prison in Idaho in 2011 while serving a life sentence for rape.
2004	2007	Rhoda Maksagak	49	Cambridge Bay	Nunavut	In March 2007, Christopher James Allukpik pleaded guilty to second-degree murder in connection with the death of Rhoda Maghagak. He was sentenced to life without eligibility for parole for 10 years. Rhoda had been dragged out of bed in the early morning hours and stabbed 23 times. Allukpik stated that he "hated women", and his motive was to "take his anger out on [Rhoda]".
1996	2024	Christopher Smith	22	Ottawa	Ontario	Smith was stabbed in an altercation on the Portage Bridge in Ottawa early on 12 April 1996, and subsequently died in a Gatineau hospital. On 16 December 2024, Ottawa Police announced that Lawrence Diehl (73), currently resident in Vancouver, British Columbia, had been arrested and charged with second-degree murder in Smith's death. Advances in genetic genealogy were credited in the breakthrough in the investigation.
1998	2025	Donna Oglive	24	Toronto	Ontario	Oglive (24) was found strangled to death in a Toronto parking lot in March 1998. She had one child and was four months pregnant at the time of her death, having arrived from British Columbia five weeks previously. She had apparently worked in the sex trade in both Vancouver and Toronto. On 7 February 2025, Toronto Police announced the arrest of a 50 year old man from Gander, Newfoundland in connection with the case. The suspect has been charged with first degree murder and had been identified using investigative genetic geneaology. At the time of the murder, the suspect had been living in Scarborough, Ontario and working as a truck driver.
2011	2025	Valérie Leblanc	18	Gatineau	Quebec	On 23 August 2011, the body of Valérie Leblanc was discovered in a wooded area near Cégep de l'Outaouais, where she was a student. A group of teenagers came across her body at around 1:00 PM, but initially believed her body was possibly a mannequin being used by the college's police education program as part of a crime scene simulation. It was reported that the teenagers had likely tampered with Leblanc's body before finally alerting law enforcement at 3:30. Gatineau police interviewed hundreds of locals and received nearly 2,200 tips from the public in connection to Leblanc and her murder. They also released a composite sketch of an unidentified "key witness", but no arrests were made in connection to the case for more than 14 years. On 30 September 2025, Gatineau police announced the arrest of Stéphane Rivard, 51, on a charge of first-degree murder in the Leblanc case. The suspect was identified using "new investigative techniques" but no additional information was released regarding the suspect or the investigation.
2008	2025	Catherine Daviau	26	Montreal	Quebec	Daviau's body had been found in her Rosemont apartment on 11 December 2008. Her body showed signs of violence and police suspected she had been sexually assaulted. The apartment was locked and there was no evidence of a break-in, which led police to believe Daviau knew the attacker, who had tried to cover his tracks be setting the apartment on fire. On 17 September 2025, the Service de police de la Ville de Montréal identified Daviau's killer as Jacques Bolduc, who had died of natural causes while in custody at the Archambault Institution in Sainte-Anne-des-Plaines, Quebec. Bolduc had been serving a sentence for two armed robberies and two attempted murders at the time of his death. Bolduc had contacted Daviau a few days before her death in response to an online classified ad to sell her car, and had been identified as the murderer using genetic genealogy.
1976	2025	Pauline Brazeau	16	Calgary	Alberta	Brazeau had recently moved to Calgary with her infant daughter, and had been out with friends on the night of 8-9 January 1976. After eating at a pizza place on 17th Avenue, Brazeau lost her gloves and returned to look for them. Her body was found a few hours later by hunters 20 kilometres west of the city. She had been stabbed multiple times. On 3 March 2025, Ronald James Edwards (75) pleaded guilty to manslaughter in Brazeau's death. In 1976, Edwards was 26, and picked Brazeau up on 17th Avenue, assuming she was a prostitute. A drunken Edwards then stabbed Brazeau, leaving her for dead. Edwards was identified via investigative genetic genealogy.
1982-1997	2025	Christine Prince, Claire Samson and Gracelyn Greenidge	25, 23, 41	Toronto	Ontario	On 11 December 2025, Toronto Police announced the identification of the killer in three separate cold cases dating back to 1982. Christine Prince (25) from Wales was working as a nanny when she disappeared on 21 June 1982 on St. Clair Avenue West after a night out with friends; her body was found the next day in the Rouge River near the Toronto Zoo. Claire Samson (23) disappeared on 1 September 1983, last seen near Jarvis and Gerrard Streets getting into a car driven by an older white man; her body was found the following day in a remote area 120 km north of Toronto. Gracelyn Greenidge (41) was found murdered in her apartment on 29 July 1997 after missing her shift as a nursing assistant. Toronto Police identified the killer in all three cases as Kenneth Smith (72 at his death in 2019). DNA samples linked the Prince and Samson killings in 2016, and subsequently to the Greenidge murder in 2017. Using genetic genealogy, Toronto Police were able to identify Smith as the killer of all three women in 2025. Smith lived in the Toronto area during the time period of each murder and was known to police, with a history of sexual assaults and multiple incarcerations. Smith is believed to be linked to other unsolved murders in the Toronto area.

== See also ==
- Canadian National Missing Persons database
- RCMP Cold Cases (Federal Police):

- Prince Edward Island
- New Brunswick
- British Columbia

Provincial Police:

- Sûreté du Québec Cold Case website (380 unresolved cases in 2023)
- Royal Newfoundland Constabulary (RNC) missing persons website

City/Regional Police:

- Vancouver Police cold cases
- Halifax Regional Police unsolved cases
- Toronto Police homicide cold cases
- Edmonton Police current and historical homicide cases
