= Buziak =

Buziak is a surname of Polish origin, prevalent in the United States and Canada.

Notable people with this surname include:

- Bob Buziak, president of RCA Records
- Helen Buziak, victim in the Our Lady of the Angels School fire
- Lindsay Buziak (1983–2008), Canadian murder victim
- Paulina Buziak (born 1986), Polish race walker
