= Edmonton Killing Fields Killer =

Edmonton Serial Killer

The Edmonton Killing Fields Killer is a suspected serial killer that was active in the Central Alberta area from 1991 (or potentially four years earlier) to 2006.

A serial killer was heavily suspected to be in the Calgary and Edmonton area after a string of sex workers went missing and were found dead in rural areas around the cities. Because they were found in nearby ditches, fields and wooded areas, the suspected killer was dubbed The Killing Fields Killer by online groups. The Royal Canadian Mounted Police behavioural analysts concluded that a cluster of these victims were definitively killed by the same serial predator. Police profiled the suspect as someone with a strong connection to rural Edmonton who drove a truck or SUV and frequently cleaned his vehicle.

== Victims ==
Some of the victims of the Killing Fields Killer that are most accepted to be connected are:

- Jennifer Janz (1991)
- Jennifer Joyes (1991)
- Keely Pincott (1991)
- Tracey Maunder (1992)
- Rebecca Boutilier (1993)
- Cara King (1997)
- Katie "Sylvia" Ballantyne (2002)
- Corrie Ottenbreit (Disappeared 2004)

These people were all found in the same way and very close to each other, with the first three found side by side in shallow graves.

There was another string of three murders known as "the Strathcona County Panic" in the winter of 1987 that are suspected to be the serial killers first killings. The only named victim of these three is Melissa Jane Letain. The RCMP has chosen not to reveal the names of the two other victims to the public.

None of the cases for these murders have been solved.

Addtionaly, there have been 39 disappearances and 40 homicides of similar high risk females/sex workers in Alberta. Some of these could also be victims of the Killing Fields Killer. A high amount of the women in the region are of Aboriginal decent. Only in recent years, after protests and the creation of KARE, injustices towards the investigation of Aboriginal peoples have been confronted.

== Information and location of the victims ==
Jennifer Janz (16): Last seen alive on July 12, 1991, leaving the emergency room at Calgary's Rockyview Hospital. On August 13, 1991, her body was discovered in a shallow grave at a construction site along the Trans-Canada Highway near Valley Ridge Road NW. An autopsy revealed she died from blunt force trauma.

Jennifer Joyes (17): Last seen alive on August 30th 1991. Her remains were found a week later on October 6th 1991. Much like Jennifer Janz, she was found in a shallow grave on the side of a highway and was found just a couple kilometers away near 77th Street and 13th Street SW Calgary.

Keely Louise Pincott (29): A mother of two and cocktail waitress who disappeared in May 1991. She was officially reported missing in November 1991. Her skeletal remains were discovered on March 10, 1992 in a shallow grave in a wooded area northeast of Cochrane, Alberta. Her cause of death has never been publicly released.

Tracey Mounder (26): Tracy was a mother of two boys and a cancer patient who turned to sex trade to pay for her boys living with their grandmother and medical costs. she when missing on October 28 1992 and was last scene alive on a walk on 3rd Avenue Downtown Calgary. her body was found three days later on a grassy field east of garden road, and forensics determined that she had been beaten and stabbed to death.

Rebecca Boutilier (20): Rebecca was a 20-year-old mother to a 15-month-old son who was working as a street-level sex worker in Calgary. She went missing on February 12, 1993 after being seen near the corner of 3rd Avenue and 4th Street SW. Her partially clad remains were found a month later on March 11, 1993 by a man tending a field east of McKnight Boulevard and 68th Street NE.

Caralyn "Cara" King (20): Caralyn was a 22-year-old Métis woman who grew up loving the outdoors and struggled with an addiction that led her into a high-risk lifestyle. She disappeared from the inner-city area of Edmonton on August 2, 1997. On September 1, 1997 her decomposed body was found by a young farmer harvesting crops in a canola field near Strathmore Way in Sherwood Park.

Katie "Sylvia" Ballantyne (40): Katie was a loving mother of 4 and a member of the Opaskwayak Cree Nation. She battled with an addiction to crack cocaine and was a survival sex worker in the Edmonton area. She was last seen on April 27, 2003 leaving a friend's house in the McCauley neighborhood of Edmonton. Her disappearance was formally reported to the Edmonton Police Service on May 5, 2003. Her skeletal remains where found July 7th, 2003 in a field near Leduc Alberta.

Corrie Ottenbreit (27): Corrie was a 27 year old mother and former figure skater before becoming a street level sex worker primarily along Edmonton's 118 Avenue corridor. She vanished on the evening of May 9, 2004 after leaving her home at around 10:00 PM to go to work. Her remains were discovered years later in April 2015 on a rural property near Rolly View in Leduc County. Her identity was confirmed through DNA comparison from a hair sample she had proactively submitted to Project KARE in 2003. Her remains were found in close proximity to several other victims, prompting police to investigate the possibility of an active serial killer.

== Potential suspects ==
Over many years there have been captures, speculation and coincidences that created a line of potential suspects for the Killing Fields Killer. The first speculation of a serial killer active in Edmonton was in 1987, when the original three women went missing and their bodies were found. A couple of people where investigated for the crime.

=== Thomas Svekla ===
Thomas Svekla posing for cameras after his arrest.

Thomas Svelka was convicted for the second-degree murder of Theresa Innes (36). He was also heavily suspected and tried for the murder of Rachel Quinney (19), whose mutilated body was found in a field near Sherwood Park. While Svekla was labeled a serial killer, forensic units confirmed he was not responsible for the historical 1990s murders.

=== Joseph Laboucan ===
Joseph was convicted in 2005 for the murder of Ellie May Meyer. The killing was originally thought to be one of the latest of the Killing Fields Killer, but was proven to be the known local predator Joseph Laboucan through forensic evidence.

=== Shawn Cameron Lamb ===
In 2012, police in Winnipeg arrested Shawn Cameron Lamb, a long-time drifter who was convicted of killing three Indigenous women. Because Lamb had a lengthy criminal history that included living and committing violent offenses in Alberta dating back to the early 1990s, Project KARE investigators heavily scrutinized his travel records. However Lamb was never linked definitively to any of the many cold cases in the Edmonton area.

=== Gary Seri ===
Mugshot of Gary Seri

Gary seri was a serial killer in Calgary and more broadly the Alberta area who was active from 1977-78. He was convicted of 4 historical killings in that time period. The breakthrough in his arrest was DNA evidence of Eva Dvorak (14), Patricia "Patsy" McQueen (14), Melissa Rehorek (20) and Barbara MacLean (19). He was suspected to be the killer in the "Strathcona County Panic" of 1987 but was cleared of suspicion after learning that he moved to British Columbia shortly after his Calgary murder spree. He was later arrested in 1998 and connected to the murders through DNA evidence.

== The Killer's Impact on Edmonton ==
The impacts of multiple serial killers being inside of the Edmonton area caused the creation of the Project KARE, a conjoined program between the RCMP and Edmonton Police Service to help investigate and solve Missing person cases and homicide cases.

Its original mandate was to help solve the missing persons and murders of vulnerable persons, particularly those working in the prostitution world and indigenous women. The time period for those cases is from 1983 to present day.

In 2005 Project KARE officially released to the public that they were investigating The Killing Fields Killer. Some responses of the Project KARE officers to the media after being questioned about the Killing Fields were:

- "We're looking at thousands of square miles. And you're dealing with one or two people out of a population of one million." RCMP Inspector Mike Skelela
- "The remains of many turned up in ditches, fields and forested areas beyond the city limits... Discovering whether this was true and, if so, to what extent, was our mandate." RCMP Inspector Mike Skelela
- "The people who are living out there have nothing to fear. The target group is very specific." Sgt. Lynn Crawford
- "We are looking at these cases collectively... It is frightening, because there's a subset of humanity out there that believes in killing vulnerable young women." Cpl. Wayne Oakes
