= 1918 Grande Prairie murders =

Oldest unsolved mass murders in Alberta's history (1918)

- Location: Grande Prairie County No. 1
- Date: June 18–20, 1918
- Weapons: .38 calibre revolver, blunt log
- Deaths: 6
- Victims: Ignace Patten, Charles Zimmer, James Wuwand, Frank Parzychowski, Joseph Snyder, and Stanley Snyder
- Perpetrator: Unknown
- Motive: Likely robbery
- Accused: Daniel Lough (acquitted) Richard Knechtel (released without trial)

The 1918 Grande Prairie murders occurred in the County of Grande Prairie No. 1, Alberta, Canada, between June 18 and 20, 1918. The case is the oldest unsolved mass murder in Albertan history and among the oldest in Canadian history.

Six men, four of whom were immigrants from Eastern Europe, were killed in total, at two farms within a few miles of Grande Prairie. The victims were Joseph and Stanley Snyder, an uncle and nephew, and business partners Ignace Patten, Charles Zimmer, and James Wuwand, as well as their friend Frank Parzychowski. One perpetrator was almost certainly responsible for both sets of killings, though the police's lead suspect, Daniel Lough, was acquitted in 1920.

== Background ==
The murders occurred during the First World War, soon after the Edmonton, Dunvegan and British Columbia Railway reached the town of Grande Prairie in 1916 and brought a modest population boom to the district. However, the number of Albertans enlisting to fight also reached its peak that year, and the area's economy was beginning to decline. Local policing was also in disarray. Enough men had left to fight in Europe that the federal North-West Mounted Police struggled to hire officers, leading to the 1917 creation of the Alberta Provincial Police.

Meanwhile, a rising number of settlers from Eastern Europe, particularly Poland and Galicia, were moving to western Canada. They faced discrimination from settlers of British extraction, who suspected the new arrivals, often from areas that fell within Austria-Hungary at the time, were more sympathetic to Germany than Britain. The fact that four of the six victims of the 1918 Grande Prairie murders were immigrants led police to believe ethnic tensions may have motivated the killer.

== Victims ==
The approximate locations of the Snyder (1) and Patten (2) homesteads, overlaid on a 1929 Grande Prairie map.

=== Joseph and Stanley Snyder ===
Joseph Snyder (b. August 24, 1860) owned a farm situated two and a half miles from Grande Prairie. He lived with his nephew, Stanley Emmett Snyder (b. April 24, 1891), whose parents were Menno Snyder, Joseph's brother, and Mary Weber.

Both Joseph and Stanley were born in the Waterloo Region of Ontario. Before moving to Alberta in 1913, Joseph was a bookkeeper. Stanley, who was suffering from kidney problems, worked for the Grand Trunk Pacific Railway in Vancouver until March 1918, when he joined his uncle in Alberta. Joseph, who was unmarried, was known as a respected and quiet man, while a close friend of Stanley's described him as "a man who attended strictly to his own business at all times." Neither was known to be on bad terms with anyone or each other, nor were they believed to possess notable sums of money by the police.

Joseph and Stanley Snyder died on June 19, 1918, at the respective ages of 57 and 27. They are buried in the historic cemetery of Flyingshot Lake.

=== Ignace Patten, Charles Zimmer, and James Wuwand ===
Originally from Poland, farmer and trapper Ignace Patten (also recorded as Patan, nicknamed John) had lived in Illinois in the United States before relocating to Alberta. He was relatively wealthy, owning both the house and farm where he died. Known to be physically active, he was a successful big game hunter who was proficient with firearms. At the time of his death, he was wearing moose hide moccasins that he made himself.

Patten's business partner, Charles Zimmer, also a farmer and trapper, came from a Lithuanian background. He had moved to the area in 1910, and wore dentures containing a distinctive gold tooth. Reporting on the crime contains several variations of his name, including Zimmner and Zermenter. Patten and Zimmer had also partnered with James Wuwand (also known as John), who was a newcomer to Canada from Russia. Known as a kindly, harmless man of short stature, locals affectionately called him "John the Russian". He had worked at a livery and in sales. Known variations of his name include Unward and Wudwud.

All three enjoyed good reputations in the district. They died on June 18 or 19, 1918, and were buried in the Catholic Mission Cemetery near Bear Creek. They were moved to the City of Grande Prairie Cemetery in 1966.

=== Frank Parzychowski ===
Frank Peter Parzychowski (also recorded as Parzychowsky) was an ethnic Ruthenian from Poland who worked as a blacksmith. At one point, he was a priest within the Greek Catholic Church, and was known to be well-travelled. He had emigrated to Canada by 1910 after living in North Dakota for 20 years and was married to a woman named Rose, who was also known as "Rosie". In 1911, he participated in a human interest story on his travels for the Evening Journal, wherein he described Grande Prairie as the best place "in the world". He died on June 18 or 19, 1918. Originally buried in the Mission Cemetery near Bear Creek, his grave was moved to the City of Grande Prairie Cemetery in 1966.

== Murders ==
=== Days preceding the crimes ===
Some time before June 14, 1918, Charles Zimmer considered selling some land he owned that adjoined the Snyder farm to Joseph Snyder himself. The Snyders' neighbour Daniel Lough paid Zimmer $2,000 in cash instead. Snyder's subsequent offer to Lough of $2,500 was declined, as Lough wanted $3,000.

On June 14, Lough met Zimmer at a store in Grande Prairie to give him a cheque for $975, the balance remaining. With Zimmer was his friend, Ignace Patten. Lough discussed purchasing oats from Patten for $100, and promised to pay him in cash for the crop at a later date.

=== Patten residence: June 18–19 ===
On June 18, 1918, Ignace Patten travelled to Grande Prairie with Zimmer and James Wuwand to collectively withdraw $5,000 from the Union Bank. They planned to visit Fort Vermilion together the next day to look at available ranches. Afterwards, the group travelled to Daniel Lough's farm to retrieve a plough Zimmer had loaned to him. Although Lough knew Patten was leaving the area soon, he did not pay Patten the $100 promised for the oats at this time. The trio visited Joseph Snyder next to retrieve a payment of oats he owed to Zimmer for a spool of barbed wire. Patten, Zimmer, and Wuwand then returned to Patten's farmstead.

At 9:30 pm that night, Andrew "Andy" Hobel (also recorded as Hobal) visited Frank Parzychowski's home to complete a transaction. Parzychowski said he was about to visit Patten to bid him farewell. As Hobel was leaving, he saw Parzychowski walk down to his gate to greet two men, who were steering a cow into Parzychowski's pasture from the direction of Snyder and Lough's farms. Hobel said the two visitors were short and tall, which the APP felt was significant, as Snyder and Lough were respectively 171 cm and 183 cm tall. However, Hobel could not identify them. As he left in the opposite direction, he saw the three men proceed to Patten's farm.

At approximately 10:00 pm, Patten's neighbour, farmer Alex "Sandy" Peebles, walked by Patten's land and saw five men outside the farmhouse. Between this sighting and noon on June 19, Patten, Zimmer, Wuwand and Parzychowski were killed. Patten's throat was cut, and the others were shot in the head by a .38 calibre Iver Johnson revolver. Patten and Wuwand were killed in their sleep, lying in makeshift beds on the floor inside Patten's house. Zimmer's body was placed inside a wagon in front of the farm's storehouse; Parzychowski's body was inside the storehouse itself.

Several empty bottles within the house suggested the men were likely drinking at some point before their deaths, except the abstinent Parzychowski. Police assessed that Zimmer, whose body was concealed by a wagon cover, was loading the wagon when he was killed, aided by Parzychowski. The Patten house and storehouse had been locked; Patten's revolver and keys were missing.

=== Snyder residence: June 19–20 ===
On June 18, 1918, Stanley and Joseph Snyder travelled into Grande Prairie together to buy general goods. They appeared to be on friendly terms with one another. Stanley returned to the town the next day, in the afternoon of June 19, to spend time with a friend, Carl Orsted. Orsted accompanied Stanley partway home at the end of their outing. They parted ways at around 6:00 pm when Stanley secured a ride home with a passing carriage, and Orsted returned to his hotel in Grande Prairie.

At 9:30 pm on June 19, Joseph Snyder, who lived with his nephew Stanley at a homestead four miles southeast of Patten's property, received a visit from neighbour Daniel Lough, who helped him tend to a lame colt. According to Lough, something spooked the horses in the Snyders' field, causing them to stampede towards the property. Lough and the Snyders investigated, but could not find anything out of the ordinary. Lough returned home at around 10:00 pm and went to bed.

Between 2:30 am and 3:00 am on June 20, Lough awoke to loud noises and raised voices originating from the Snyder property. One man shouted, "Help!", to which another replied, "I'll help you" or "I'll fix you." Opting to investigate, Lough waded through a bog between his land and that of the Snyders and was soaked up to his waist.

Lough soon realized that the Snyder property was on fire. The flames deterred him from trying to render aid. He decided to fetch police help from Grande Prairie, though the house's occupants had already been killed. Joseph had been shot under his eye; the bullet had lodged in his brain. Stanley appeared to have been killed by a blunt object, which crushed his head. A suspected bullet hole was found behind his right ear, but the bullet was never found. His friend, Carl Orsted, would only be able to identify Stanley by the gold fillings in his teeth.

It took Lough a "considerable" amount of time to chase down a horse, but upon securing one, he made for Grande Prairie. The Snyder property burned down in Lough's absence. The fire scorched Joseph Snyder's body almost beyond recognition, while the house's sod roof fell over Stanley's body, sparing it from comparable damage.

== Discovery ==
Grande Prairie barracks of the Alberta Provincial Police, photographed in 1913.

=== Snyder residence: June 20 ===
After leaving the burning Snyder house, Lough travelled by horse to reach the Grande Prairie detachment of the Alberta Provincial Police (APP) before 4:00 am. His knocking woke Corporal William Allen, who in turn told Lough to fetch the local livery owner, Albert Thompson. Lough retrieved Thompson, who owned a car, at around 4:00 am to drive Allen to the Snyder homestead. They arrived at the scene by 4:30 am, with Lough arriving first on his horse.

The trio waited for the fire, which was still burning, to subside before investigating indoors. They saw a trail of blood leading from where the door had been to a bloodied log. The mud appeared to bear one set of human tracks, leading away from the property in a westerly direction, but roaming cattle had disturbed the mud.

Lough noticed the charred body of Joseph Snyder, which was sitting in an upright position, inside the burned-out house. A .38 calibre revolver containing five spent shell casings was sitting atop the sod roof covering Stanley, just behind Joseph's body. Allen and Thompson used sticks to hook and retrieve the firearm. Although police later suspected that this revolver was Ignace Patten's missing gun, their efforts to trace the gun's owner would never prove successful. A ring of keys, later confirmed to be Patten's missing set, was also discovered.

After reviewing evidence from Allen and the coroner, Sergeant Patrick Egan and Inspector Albert McDonnell concluded that Joseph had killed Stanley and then himself. However, this theory did not explain how Joseph had thrown the gun on top of the roof covering Stanley after shooting himself.

=== Patten residence: June 25 ===
On June 25, Alex Peebles visited Grande Prairie's APP detachment to report concerns about Patten's welfare. He had tried to visit his neighbour after finding Patten's horses in his field, only to see the wagons loaded for Patten's planned trip to Fort Vermilion undisturbed in the yard. Patten's door was also locked, which was unusual, and his agitated dog warded Peebles away, so he decided to alert the police.

After hearing Peebles' report, Inspector McDonnell dispatched Sergeant Egan and Corporal S. McPherson. They discovered the bodies of Patten, Zimmer, Wuwand and Parzychowski in a state of decomposition that suggested they had died soon before the Snyders. Because the revolver found at the Snyder property had been recently fired and matched the calibre of Patten's missing gun, Egan determined that the same murderer was responsible for both sets of crimes. The murderer's aim suggested they were a strong marksman.

== Investigation ==
=== Initial investigation ===
The APP did little to secure the Snyder or Patten residences. Buildings were left unlocked, allowing members of the public, driven by morbid curiosity, to enter the crime scenes, thus disturbing potential evidence. After newspapers reported the murders, local farmers put pressure on the APP to quickly find the culprit by staging mass meetings and protests. Early reporting speculated that robbery was the perpetrator's motive, and that a gang may have been responsible.

A coroner's jury launched an inquest into all six deaths. The jury heard Patten had recently bought bullets for his gun in Grande Prairie. Witnesses attested that many of Patten's neighbours knew he, Zimmer, and Wuwand would be carrying around $5,000 in cash that night, owing to their plans to scope out land in Fort Vermilion. However, only Wuwand had money in his pockets, totalling $108. Those who knew Wuwand found this detail strange, as he rarely carried cash and was not particularly affluent. The inquest found that all six men, including the Snyders, had been murdered.

John D. Nicholson, former AcPP assistant superintendent and chief investigator for the Attorney General of Alberta, was dispatched to Grande Prairie on July 16, 1918. Nicholson had previously clashed professionally with the APP's Inspector Albert McDonnell, and found the police resentful of his involvement in the case. Even so, Nicholson began to interview witnesses undisturbed. He found his work complicated by the APP's failure to secure the crime scenes. By the end of the year, the APP told the Government of Alberta that the crimes were "the work of foreigners... without a doubt", despite identifying no suspects.

=== Public criticism ===
Criticism of the APP's progress began early in the investigation. On July 16, 1918, the Grande Prairie Herald ran a front-page editorial that accused the APP of botching the case, partly due to inadequate staffing. The article criticized the APP for assigning two officers to the Grande Prairie district when the federal North-West Mounted Police had typically assigned six, suggesting that, had the areas been adequately patrolled, it may have been possible to encounter the culprit.

Shortly after the Herald's piece, 226 women signed a petition urging the Attorney General to take "immediate steps... toward the proper and adequate policing of the Grande Prairie District and Northern Alberta". On July 23, the Attorney General's office announced a $1,000 reward that month for the killer's capture. No conviction materialized, and criticism continued.

In April and June 1920, Patrick Sullivan, an APP detective based in Grande Prairie and admitted alcoholic, penned editorials for the Herald with the pseudonym "A Disgusted Citizen". He accused the APP of incompetence and urged the public to protest. He was soon identified as the author and dismissed from the APP, though he continued to write disparagingly about the case through 1920, even after a suspect was arrested in June.

== Suspicion of Daniel Lough ==
=== Suspect background ===
Daniel "Dan" Lough (born 1876), the neighbour of Joseph and Stanley Snyder at the time of their deaths, quickly emerged as the APP's primary suspect. Originally from San Jose, Illinois in the United States, he had moved to Canada in 1910 and relocated to Grande Prairie in the summer of 1914 with his wife and three children. The Loughs moved to the property beside Joseph Snyder's around 1917.

=== Investigation by John Nicholson ===
John D. Nicholson (left) in 1922, with Alberta Provincial Police Commissioner W. C. Bryan (centre) and Inspector E. W. Bavin (right).

Albert Thompson, the car owner who drove to the Snyder house early on June 20, told police he saw only one set of tracks: that of Daniel Lough. Thompson's account stood out to at least one APP constable, who suspected Lough had waded through the stream not to reach the house faster, but to wash blood from his clothes after killing the Snyders.

Though Nicholson considered many suspects, he, too, quickly grew suspicious of Lough. He found it strange that Lough had not stopped at any of his neighbours' houses to seek help after finding the Snyder house ablaze, instead proceeding to Grande Prairie some miles away. John McAuley, a neighbour to the Snyders and Lough, similarly told police he did not understand why Lough hadn't tried to wake him, especially as Lough would need to pass McAuley's home in order to reach Grande Prairie. Nicholson also questioned why Lough had opted to leave his wife and children alone for hours.

Lough submitted to several police interviews. He placed himself at the Snyder home around the time their murders were carried out. He had also recently bought land from Zimmer, and knew that the men at the Patten residence would be taking thousands of dollars with them soon. Early in his investigation, Nicholson visited Lough's house at around 2:00 am one night to find the door unlocked and Lough asleep. Nicholson found this odd, given that most farmers began locking their doors after the crimes occurred.

On August 5, during an interview with Nicholson, Lough shared no plans to leave the area. Later that day, Nicholson overheard Henry Gordon, a local taxi driver, discussing plans to drive the Loughs to Edmonton the following day. Nicholson confronted Lough, who insisted he was only accompanying his family to Edmonton to say goodbye; they were going to visit family in Illinois without him. The Edmonton APP monitored Lough during his time in the city, and he soon returned to Grande Prairie as promised. August also saw Nicholson find a total of $47 in blood-stained banknotes circulating locally, suggesting the perpetrator was still in the area. The Union Bank's staff could not recall where the notes had come from, but had assumed the stains came from a local butcher.

On September 16, Nicholson provided the names of his main suspects, including Lough, to the Deputy Attorney General. However, the Spanish Flu pandemic killed several important witnesses in November, including a police officer who had examined the Snyder scene and Lough's wife, Ann, who died alongside the couple's youngest children. Lough auctioned his farming machinery in mid-November, and relocated to a farm twelve miles east of Grande Prairie the following month. After Nicholson's investigation continued with little progress in 1919, the Attorney General increased the reward for information to $5,000 on May 26, 1920.

=== Arrest and trial ===
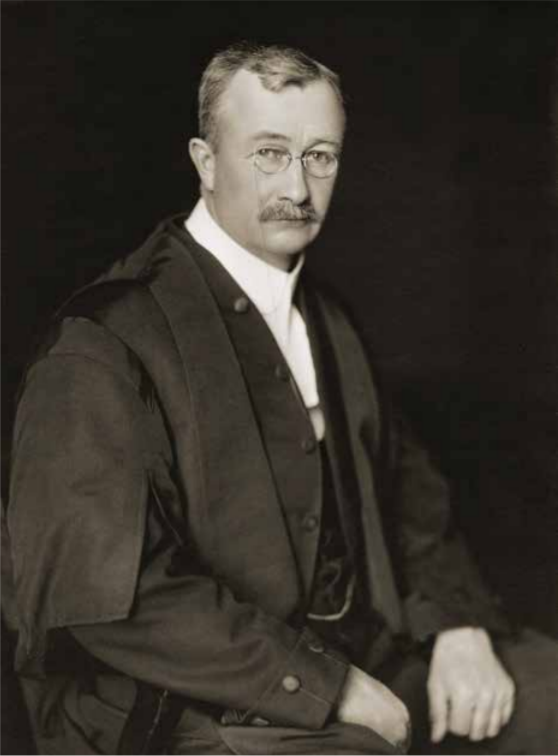
Justice William Charles Simmons, who presided over the hearings of Daniel Lough and Richard Knechtel.

Upon receiving no further tips, the APP proceeded to arrest Lough on June 23, 1920. He was held in custody at Fort Saskatchewan. On November 22, before his case reached court, Nicholson expressed doubt to the Deputy Attorney General that the circumstantial case could achieve a conviction. Nonetheless, he argued that residents of the Grande Prairie district were sufficiently suspicious of Lough that his case should be brought before a jury to avoid public backlash.

Lough's trial subsequently commenced at 10:00 am on December 8, 1920, presided over by Judge William Charles Simmons. He was charged only with the murders of the Snyders. Witnesses included Alex Peebles, Patten's neighbour who had asked police to investigate the strange circumstances at Ignace Patten's house, and Corporal Allen, who had first attended the Snyder house in 1918. John McAuley, a neighbour of both Lough and the Snyders, insisted that the Snyders owned only a shotgun.

Nicholson was the prosecution's main witness. He outlined his interactions with Lough, recounted finding the bloodied banknotes, and disputed Lough's claim that it would have been too dark on a June morning to better recall the condition of the Snyder house before leaving to fetch police. He also questioned Lough's claim of hearing shouts from the Snyder property, but not gunshots. He theorized that Lough, aware that Patten and his guests were carrying significant amounts of money, had killed them to steal the cash, then killed the Snyders to cover his tracks, as they may have been aware of his visit to Patten.

Lough did not testify. His defence argued that the prosecution's case rested on statements Lough had given to the APP voluntarily, and never recanted. Furthermore, the money missing from the Patten residence had not been recovered (nor would it ever be). Nicholson had found no evidence that Lough owned guns, which ran contrary to the killer's apparent proficiency with firearms. Reporting described Lough as "entirely at ease" during the trial, chatting "casually" with his police escort during breaks. After an hour of deliberations on December 9, the jury rendered a verdict of not guilty, throughout which Lough remained stoic. Lough walked free at 5:30 pm, and the Edmonton Journal attributed his acquittal to the circumstantial nature of the Crown's case.

=== After acquittal ===
Lough faced poor health and financial difficulties after the trial. He returned to the United States with his two children, who had been in a children's home while he was imprisoned. According to one local history, he died shortly after returning to Illinois.

== Other suspects ==
=== Earl Salisbury and Norman Keeler ===
In June 1918, the APP was already investigating a string of robberies in the Grande Prairie district, perpetrated by two men working together. They were seen leaving Grande Prairie in the early hours of June 20. Corporal William Allen tracked sightings to the Wapiti River on June 26, where he found drifters Earl "Shorty" Salisbury and Norman Keeler with "quite a stock of provisions". Keeler was heavily armed and began firing at Allen, launching an hour-long gunfight that ended when Allen shot Keeler in the thigh.

Salisbury and Keeler surrendered and were brought to Edmonton to be charged with theft. They were found guilty and sentenced to six months' imprisonment on June 29, 1918. Because robbery was the suspected motive behind the earlier murders, the APP questioned the pair, who strongly denied any involvement. The APP struggled to establish a connection between them and the killings, and the line of inquiry ended when John Nicholson found evidence that Salisbury and Keeler had been camping several miles away from the scene of the murders between June 18 and 20.

Keeler's wife later accused Corporal Allen himself. She alleged that Allen had intentionally let members of the public "tramp over" the unsecured crime scenes to remove evidence of his involvement, believing Allen had shot her husband in the hopes he would die from his injuries and serve as a "dead fall guy."

=== Joseph Snyder ===
Superintendent Willoughby Bryan and Detective James Irvine of the APP believed that Joseph Snyder himself had perpetrated the murders at the Patten household, then returned home in an agitated state that caused him to instigate an argument with Stanley Snyder. Now in possession of Patten's gun, Joseph killed Stanley and then shot himself.

As noted by writer Lisa Wojna, the theory does not explain how Joseph would have managed to throw the revolver onto the sod roof that covered Stanley after shooting himself. Alex Peebles, a local farmer who had known Joseph since 1910, described him as being afraid of firearms. John McAuley, another neighbour of the Snyders and long-term acquaintance of Joseph, also testified that while Snyder owned a shotgun, he seemed to be fearful of using it.

=== Richard Knechtel ===
Richard Knechtel (also recorded as Knechel), who was an ethnic German born in Bohemia in 1883, began farming in the area in 1911. He was acquainted with the six victims, as he lived three miles away from both the Snyder and Patten homesteads. Early in the investigation, he identified that the keys found at the Snyder property belonged to Patten. Six months after Frank Parzychowski's death, he married Frank's widow, Rose.

Rose had already attracted Nicholson's suspicion, even though she was away in June 1918, visiting family in the United States. She knew Frank possessed around $450 in gold coins, which the police had been unable to find. Upon her return, Rose reportedly had a feeling that Frank had hidden the gold at Patten's home. She claimed to find the gold stashed inside a boot in Patten's woodshed. The Grande Prairie Herald described this incident as evidence that the police had failed to properly search the site. In any case, Nicholson believed it was possible that Rose had intimate knowledge of the crime scene, despite having been away. Furthermore, Daniel Lough, after his own acquittal, suggested to police that Knechtel was a likelier culprit.

On February 8, 1921, shortly after Lough's trial ended, the APP arrested Knechtel for killing Patten, Zimmer, Wuwand and Parzychowski, advancing that he and Rose had begun an affair before Parzychowski's death. A preliminary hearing on the strength of the prosecution's case occurred on February 14, presided over by Judge Simmons, who had also overseen Lough's trial. Not only did Knechtel produce an alibi, but the prosecution also had no evidence that Rose and Knechtel's relationship predated the murders. Knechtel was released without trial.

=== Frank Sweradowsky ===
In the summer of 1918, farmer John Wynnychuk went missing from Hythe, Alberta, 40 miles from Grande Prairie. He was an "alien enemy", or, an immigrant from a part of Eastern Europe deemed hostile to Canada's wartime interests, and was required to report periodically to the APP. He last reported on June 1, 1918, prompting police to visit. After neighbours said they had not seen Wynnychuk for some time, the police entered his home to find signs of a violent struggle. A wheelbarrow held blood, hair, and a bloodied axe. Wynnychuk's pillow was pierced by a bullet, and all of his valuables were missing. Investigation into where the items had gone led police to August Frank Sweradowsky (also known as Steve), Wynnychuk's neighbour.

Sweradowsky had sold the items in Grande Prairie under a pseudonym. A search of his home found a rifle that matched the calibre of the bullet found in Wynnychuk's pillow, and clothing that appeared to bear bloodstains. Sweradowsky himself was arrested on September 30. He admitted that he shot his neighbour in anger after Wynnychuk allegedly threatened him and refused to repay a loan of $15. He used the wheelbarrow found at the crime scene to dump Wynnychuk's body in the Beaver River fifty yards away. While awaiting trial, Sweradowsky escaped custody on October 2, but was recaptured on November 5. He was condemned to death three days later, though his sentence was soon commuted to life imprisonment.

John Nicholson was involved in the early investigation into Wynnychuk's disappearance, and briefly suspected Sweradowsky was involved in the Grande Prairie murders after learning he was acquainted with Ignace Patten. As Wynnychuk's remains were never found, the case is one of the few murder convictions in Alberta where the victim's body was missing.

== Aftermath ==
For some years after the killings, residents of Grande Prairie were reluctant to outwardly display wealth, in case the APP suspected them of having unusual means for a homesteader. Surrounding communities expected the case to be solved through the deathbed confession of the perpetrator or an accomplice, but this ultimately did not occur.

== In media and popular culture ==
=== The Foulest of Murders (2012) ===
Starting in the early 1990s, former mayor of Wanham and amateur historian Wallace "Wally" Tansem spent a decade researching the case. Having grown up hearing his father discuss the case, he harboured a lifelong interest. He died in 2001, with his book unpublished. Before his death, he asked his wife Doris to ensure the book was finished, so she sought help from Daryl White, a teacher at Northwestern Polytechnic. Tansem's book, The Foulest of Murders, was published in 2012.

=== Blood on the Prairie (2022) ===
In March 2021, producers Chris Beauchamp and Cris Seppola received $10,000 in funding from Telus to create a true crime podcast on the 1918 Grande Prairie murders. Their series Blood on the Prairie began to release episodes in 2022.
