= Murders of Lorraine McNab and Peter Sopow =

1997 shooting of a couple in Pincher Creek, Alberta

- Peter Sopow (left) and Lorraine McNab (right)
- Location: Pincher Creek, Alberta, Canada
- Date: December 13, 1997; 28 years ago
- Attack type: Shooting
- Weapon: Gun
- Victims: Lorraine McNab; Peter Sopow

On December 13, 1997, Lorraine McNab and Peter Sopow, a 47-year-old kindergarten teacher and 52-year-old Royal Canadian Mounted Police sergeant near Pincher Creek, Alberta, Canada, were driving home after a dinner out with family on a late Saturday night, and they were suddenly ambushed and shot. Almost two days later, both of their bodies were found in a horse trailer on the property. The murders still remain unsolved.

== Background ==
Peter Sopow was born in Nelson, British Columbia, Canada, and graduated from the Royal Canadian Mounted Police training in Regina, Saskatchewan, at 19 years of age. At 37 years old, he was stationed at detachments all around Alberta, becoming one of the youngest to become a sergeant. In 1997, he was the commander of the nearby Fort Macleod RCMP Department in Alberta, was divorced, had two children, and was eventually retiring. Lorraine McNab was also divorced, a 47-year-old cowgirl and kindergarten teacher at Canyon Elementary School, Pincher Creek, Alberta, and had a daughter and son. She had been teaching children said to be around 5 years old in the winter of 1997.

== Incident ==
On the evening of December 13, 1997, McNab and Sopow left the house and walked to their truck, and started the 28 km (17 mi) drive to Twin Butte to go to Lorraine's father's and stepmother’s home to have a family dinner. Around 10 p.m., after the dinner, McNab and Sopow went back to their truck and left the residence under a full moon. Between 10:30 p.m. and 12:00 a.m., they pulled back into their property. The couple exited the truck and began walking towards the acreage, and they were suddenly shot right from their porch with a .22 calibre rifle. McNab and Sopow were killed on the spot.

== Discovery ==
At around 1:00 a.m., McNab's daughter returned home after going on a night out, but did not see McNab or Sopow. She assumed that they were in their bedroom as the lights were out, and the truck was parked in the driveway. She did not assume anything suspicious yet. On December 14, Sopow did not show up to work in Pincher Creek. His absence was dismissed, but concern grew when he did not show up for work on December 15, and officers were dispatched to search for him. During the day and a half long search, the wind blew hard, scrubbing the crime scene, making the RCMP investigation difficult.

Around 11:30 a.m., 36 hours after the incident, a forensic unit RCMP member from Lethbridge, named Jim Semeschuk, found their lifeless bodies inside a horse trailer on the property.

== Investigation ==
Investigations found that an out-of-place muscle car was seen around the property that weekend, that there was no evidence of a break in, no thefts from Sopow’s wallet, and that McNab allegedly had a jealous stalker. According to police, the car belonged to McNab’s alleged jealous stalker who also owned a muscle car like the one spotted near her property right around December 13.

On December 17, RCMP arrested and questioned a local man named Wally Sparks, a local elementary teacher who, according to his neighbours in Cowley, had personally known McNab when they taught at the same school. Sparks' car matched a 1970's Mercury Cougar seen parked near the murder scene, and his description was close to the one provided for the driver of the maroon car. Under the Alberta Mental Health Act, Sparks was transferred to Chinook Regional Hospital, a psychiatric hospital in Lethbridge. In February 1998, he was released without charge and, as of 2015, lives in Cowley.

A .22-calibre rifle went missing from Cowley. It has been unconfirmed if the rifle and car belong to the same person, but the gun’s owner was questioned on how the gun vanished. As of today, the rifle, and the perpetrators responsible for the crime were never found, despite repeated, extensive searches.

== Family theories ==
Sopow's brother, Elly Preston, doesn’t support the theory that Sparks is guilty of the crime. Preston has her own theories about who may have killed her brother and McNab, including the possibility of more than one person being present. People believed Sopow had bought a ring for McNab with the purpose of proposing, but Preston said Sopow was actually buying a necklace for McNab as a Christmas gift, and believes someone acted out of jealousy.

McNab's daughter also has her theories about the person or persons responsible for Sopow and her mom’s death. She said a man was determined in his pursuit of her mom, claiming that when they had a house phone, no one would say anything, they would just stay on the line. When McNab was away, sometimes he would drop flowers or fish right from his fishpond, and leave them on the deck.

== Funeral ==
On December 20, 1997, a regimental funeral was held for Sopow in Edmonton, and more than 700 officers attended. McNab’s funeral was held two days later in Pincher Creek with over 1,000 people in attendance.
