= Toronto RCMP Building =

Coordinates: 43.656392°N 79.373785°W

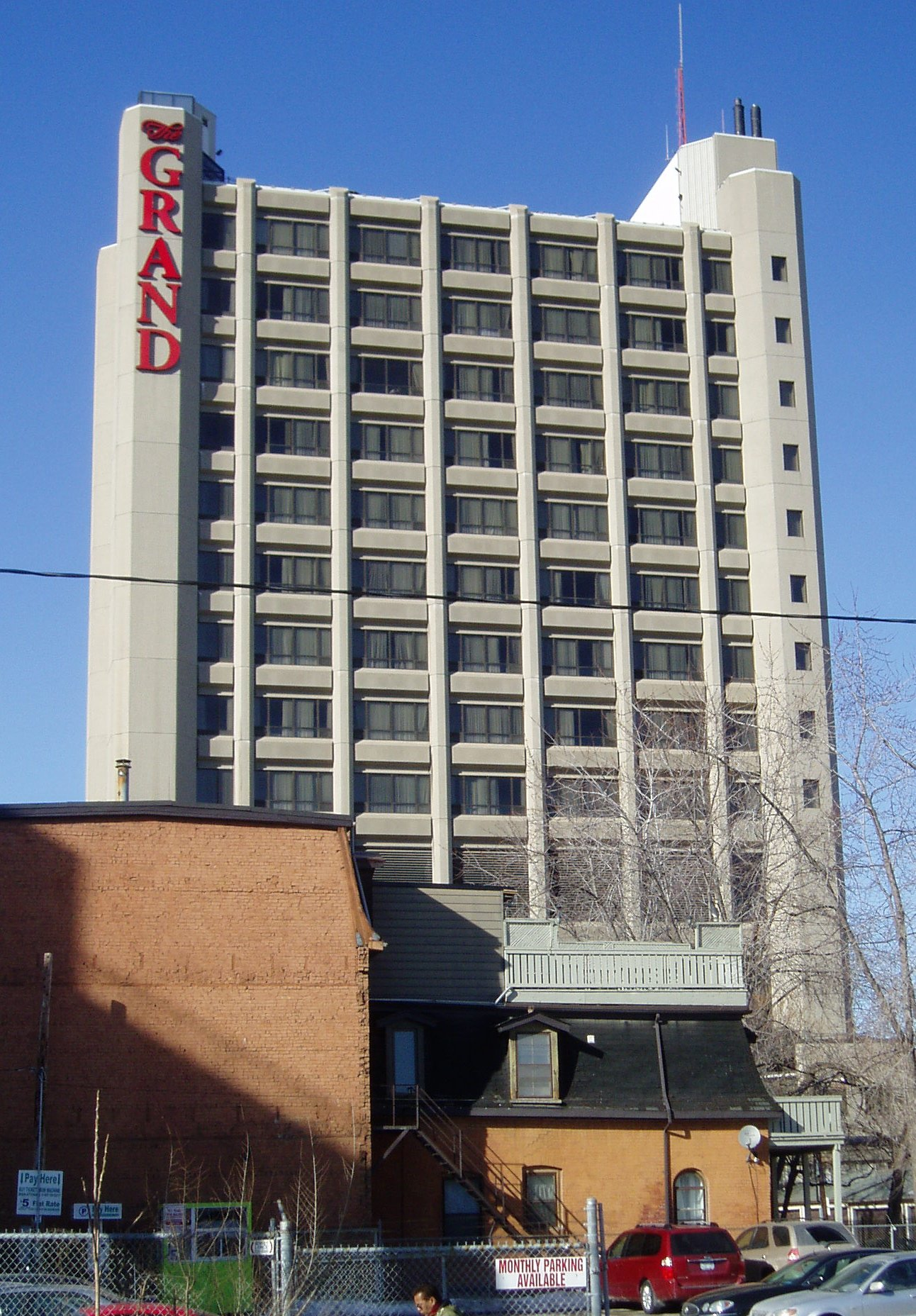
The former RCMP building, then the Grand Hotel & Suites Toronto. Demolished in 2019.

The Toronto RCMP Building at 225 Jarvis Street was the headquarters for the RCMP "O" Division detachment in Toronto from 1972 to 1993.

Prior to moving to the Jarvis street locations, the detachment had been headquartered in various buildings and houses between 3 and 21 Sullivan Street (1960–1972), including 11 Sullivan Street, the former Rubberset Co building, and the Beverly Street Barracks at 136 Beverly Street (formerly Beardmore Mansion and now Italian Consulate General in Toronto).

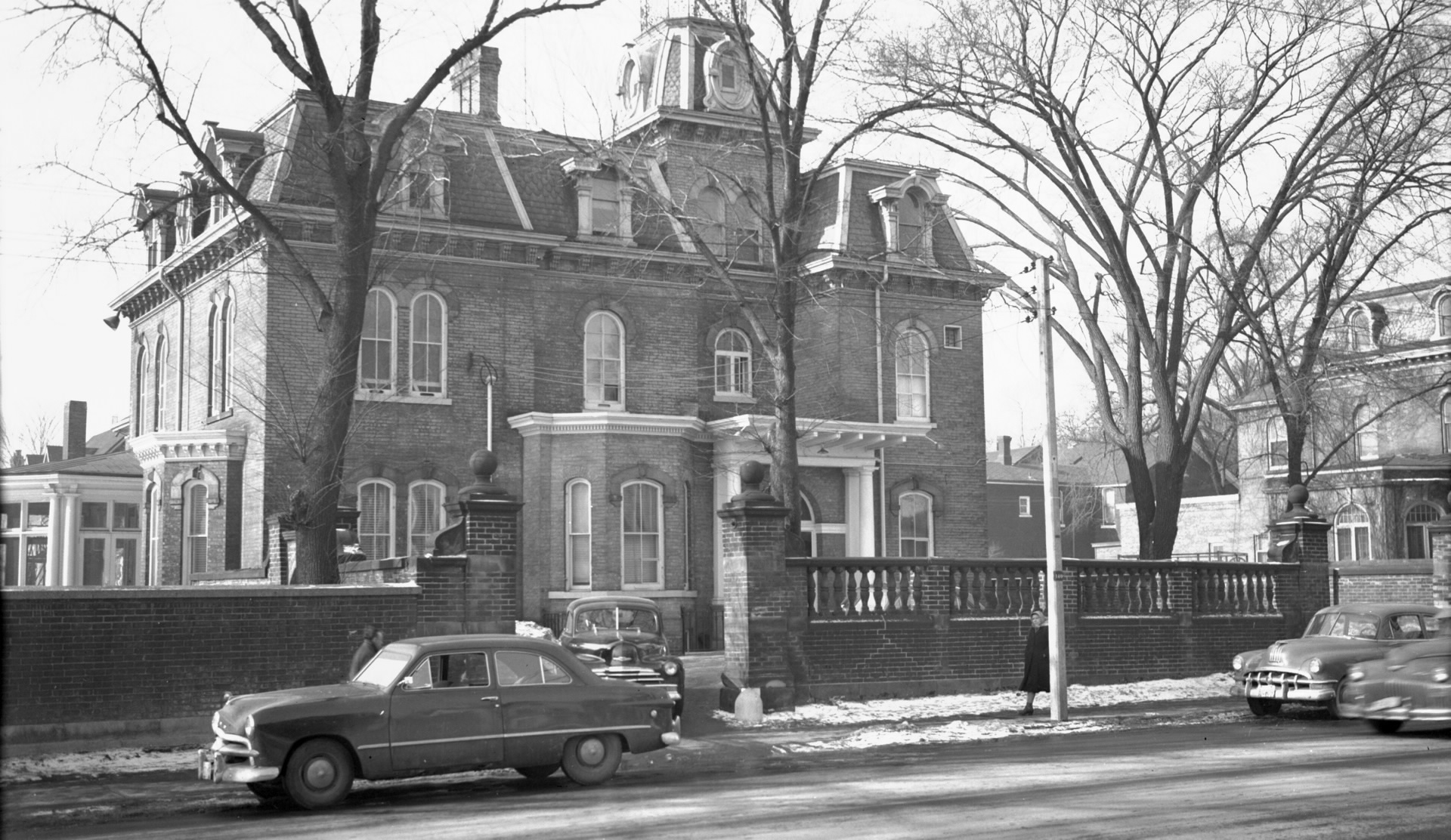
Photo of the "Beverley Street Barracks," RCMP o-Division Headquarters from 1940 through 1959

The unique glass front and brown sided building is located in the downtown core. The building featured a vault in the basement. The RCMP O Division was relocated in 1993 to London, Ontario and the building was later renovated to become the 177-suite Grand Hotel & Suites Toronto and demolished in 2019.

== 2015 Fire ==
A 1-alarm fire occurred at approximately 10:55 pm on March 4, 2015. 10 fire trucks and two commands were sent to the building to fight the fire. The fire seems to have originated from the building sign. Falling debris had ignited a restaurant's roof under the sign. Police falsely reported the fire extinguished at approximately 11:40 pm. At 12:16 am, the fire was contained to the space between the A and the N on the sign. At 12:18 am, no more visible signs of fire were present and suppression operations were halted. All clear reported at 12:35 am.

== Post Relocation Toronto Division ==
The current "O" Division are divided into 4 sub-units in the Greater Toronto Area:

- Toronto West - Milton
- Toronto North - Newmarket
- Toronto East - Bowmanville
- Toronto Airport - Etobicoke
