= Murder of Marie Goudreau =

Unsolved 1976 murder in Alberta, Canada

Marie Goudreau
- Graduation photo of Goudreau prior to her murder
- Born: c. 1959; Alberta, Canada
- Died: August 2, 1976 (aged 17); Edmonton, Alberta, Canada
- Cause of death: Strangulation
- Education: St. Joseph’s Composite High School

On August 2, 1976, Marie Judy Goudreau, a 17-year-old high school graduate from Beaumont, Alberta, Canada, was killed by an unknown individual while driving home, just outside Edmonton, Alberta, Canada. Goudreau, having spent the day in Edmonton with her friends, was driving home to Beaumont at around 10:30 p.m., and after stopping was strangled by an unknown individual. Two days later, her body was located in a watery ditch in Devon, Alberta. An autopsy revealed she died from strangulation, and her death prompted a widespread search for the killer. The killer has never been found, and this case remains one of Edmonton's most infamous and perplexing murders which still has ongoing searches and investigations.

== Background ==
Marie Judy Goudreau was born in c. 1959, and was the second youngest of eight siblings. Goudreau had graduated St. Joseph’s Composite High School at the time of her death, and had been accepted into MacEwan University to pursue a career in law enforcement. She also enjoyed music and sports. She was described as "a bright, vibrant light," who "brought warmth, humour and endless energy into her family". Prior to her death, she had a new job in which she worked at the Woodward Café at the Southgate Centre in southern Edmonton.

== Incident ==
A vehicle of the make and model in which Goudreau had been driving

On August 2, 1976, Goudreau had spent her evening in Edmonton, Alberta, Canada, spending an evening out with her friends. After having dropped off one of her friends at the Edmonton City Centre Airport around 9:15 p.m., she went to their apartment to visit two other friends. At around 10:30 p.m., Goudreau became tired, and told her friends that she had to go home, and left the apartment.

Goudreau walked to her vehicle, described as a blue 1972 Plymouth Cricket, to drive back home. She started the drive back to her house on Township Road 502, also known locally as Airport Road, approximately 11 km (6.8 mi) from Beaumont. When she was about 6.5 km (4.0 mi) away from Beaumont, something caused her to pull over and leave her vehicle. She was then strangled to death by an unknown individual.

Shortly after 12:00 a.m., Goudreau's car was spotted on Range Road 244 by a local woman, Murray Kitsch. The engine was still running, the headlights were still on, the drivers window was mostly rolled down, and the driver's side door was slightly ajar. Kitsch reported her sighting to the Royal Canadian Mounted Police. Royal Canadian Mounted Police found Goudreau's personal belongings still inside and undisturbed. These items included a purse with cash, a mahogany leather jacket folded on the backseat, and her leather sandals.

On August 4, 1976, between 7:00 p.m. and 8:00 p.m., two children found Goudreau's body lying face down in a watery ditch near Highway 60, approximately 26 km (16 mi) from where her car was discovered. Royal Canadian Mounted Police found out that her clothing had been removed, but most of it was discovered nearby. However, her ankle socks and her pants were never recovered.

== Investigation and aftermath ==
Following the incident, eyewitnesses reported seeing a truck idle on Range Road 244 and Township Road 510 west of Beaumont, between 10:50 p.m. and 11:00 p.m. This led police to believe that somebody flagged down Goudreau, possibly pretending to have been broken down, and abducted her when she exited her vehicle. However, Goudreau was never believed to have been interested in picking up hitchhikers.

Two weeks before Goudreau's murder, her cousin, also named Marie, claimed to have received a phone call at around 9:30 p.m., which police had initially dismissed as a prank call. The caller was an unidentified male asking for Marie Goudreau, following the call with death threats and demanding "take your pants off".

Nobody has been able to put a name to Goudreau's killer. Despite there having been DNA evidence collected at the scene, it has not been linked to anyone.

In the months following Goudreau's murder, at least six people in the area reported being approached or stopped, by men claiming to have been police officers. The first known occurrence of a police impersonator in the area came two weeks after the murder. In one incident, a male who was barefoot, wearing a t-shirt and jeans, stopped the car and inspected the driver's licence and registration. Goudreau's cousin was also approached by an unknown man three weeks after the murder, asking if she was her sister.
