= Murder of Byron Carr =

Unsolved 1988 murder in Prince Edward Island, Canada

Byron Carr
- Born: 1952
- Died: November 11, 1988 (aged 36); Charlottetown, Prince Edward Island, Canada
- Cause of death: Loss of oxygen

On the morning of November 12, 1988, Byron Howard Carr, a 36-year-old schoolteacher in Charlottetown, Prince Edward Island, Canada, was found dead in his bedroom at his Lapthorne Avenue home. When he arrived at his home the morning prior, he was strangled with a towel and stabbed, with the killer leaving a message on a piece of paper reading: "I will kill again". As of 2026, the case remains Prince Edward Island's only major unsolved homicide.

== Background ==
Byron Howard Carr was born in 1952, lived in Charlottetown, Prince Edward Island, and had a sibling. He was homosexual and a high school teacher. He was known as a loving friend to many people on Prince Edward Island.

== Death ==
One of his students, John Jamieson, claimed to have met up with Carr at a Tim Hortons on Kent Street, Charlottetown the day before he died. Carr taught Jamieson English at Montague Regional High School a few years prior. Jamieson added, "Even after you were no longer his student, he was still interested in what you were up to".

On November 11, 1988, Carr arrived back at his home just past 3 a.m.. He is believed to have been on a night out with friends. He went inside his house and entered his bedroom, and he was suddenly strangled with a towel by an unknown individual. Carr eventually died due to lack of oxygen.

Afterwards, Carr was stabbed multiple times and the killer fled.

== Discovery and investigation ==
On November 12, 1988, at around 2:30 a.m., residents reported hearing Carr's dog barking, which was apparently uncommon, as well as a vehicle leaving the area at high speed. Police believe the murderer and another man came back to retrieve items that might identify them as the killer. At 11 a.m., people were concerned when Carr didn't show up at a family function. Relatives arrived at his house that morning. They found the kitchen door slightly ajar and his dog locked up in a kennel, before discovering his body in the bedroom. A note was found on the wall of Carr's bedroom, reading: "I will kill again".

Investigators went around the area, talking to witnesses and neighbours, with hopes to gather information about the killer. But, most neighbours could not give any decent information or alibis. However, one witness claimed to have seen Carr talking to a man on a bicycle around 3:05 a.m., eventually pulling away and driving to the direction of his house, becoming the last time Carr was ever seen alive, and police believed the cyclist was his killer.

Deputy Chief, Brad MacConnell, who reopened the case in 2007, says he was 'outed by his death'. A 2018 article says police believe Carr had been in a consentual conversation with another homosexual man. MacConnell has interviewed hundreds of witnesses ever since he opened the file, gradually uncovering new leads and evidence. He has not been able to put a name to Carr's killer, but he has believed he has gotten closer to solving it.

In 2008, the witness who saw Carr speaking to the cyclist spoke up 20 years later. Police were skeptical, taking a polygraph to ensure he was telling the truth, and he passed. Police have put together a potential profile of the killer. The killer was described as being between 15 and 25 years old at the time of the incident, had a high risk lifestyle, was likely bisexual, had previous low-level convictions, and lived in Charlottetown.

=== Suspects ===
On January 25, 2024, a 56-year-old man named Todd Joseph Gallant was charged with one count of first-degree murder and one count of interfering with human remains. He was arrested that morning, with police saying significant DNA evidence collected at the crime scene pointed to him. Gallant was 21 in 1988.

On October 8, 2024, Gallant pled not guilty. On July 30, 2026, Gallant was released from custody under strict bill conditions. He has a four week long jury trial from November 24, 2026, to December 18, 2026. All charges were withdrawn in October 2026 after key pieces of evidence, including the knife and towel used, were discovered to be missing.
