= Murder of Lindsay Buziak =

Murder of a Canadian real estate agent

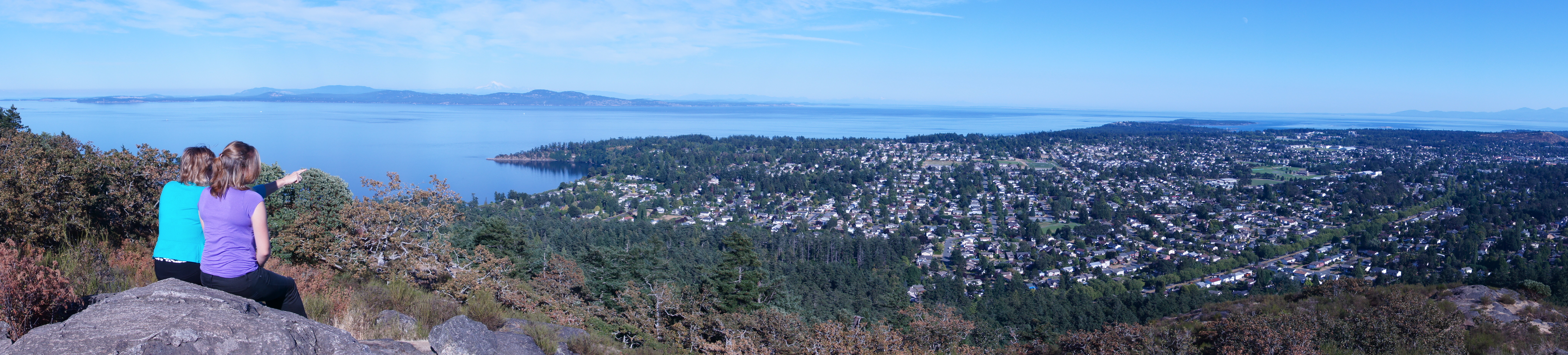
View of Saanich from Mt. Douglas

Locations
1 1702 De Sousa Place, Saanich, Victoria, British Columbia, Canada

Lindsay Elizabeth Buziak (November 2, 1983 – February 2, 2008) was a Canadian real estate agent who was murdered on February 2, 2008, during a property viewing in Saanich, a suburb of Victoria, British Columbia, after being lured to meet a man and a woman posing as prospective clients seeking a million-dollar home. The murder remains unsolved.

== Background ==
Lindsay Elizabeth Buziak was born on November 2, 1983, to Jeff and Evelyn (née Reitmayer) Buziak. She had one sister, Sara. In 2008, 24-year-old Buziak was an ambitious Victoria real-estate agent who had made a promising start to her career and was described by her family, friends and colleagues as popular and caring. Her boyfriend Jason Zailo is a member of a prominent and wealthy family that owns a successful real-estate business.

In late January 2008, Buziak received a call from a woman who said that she and her husband were urgently seeking a home with a budget of $1 million. The caller had a foreign accent and offered what was later determined to be a fake name. Unnerved by the nature of the call, Buziak asked the caller how she had obtained her personal cell-phone number, as she was a relatively junior employee. The caller claimed that one of Buziak's previous clients had shared it with her. Buziak told Zailo and her father about the call and revealed her concerns. Zailo encouraged Buziak to meet with the client because of the high commission that she would earn from the sale of the home. To reassure her, Zailo offered to show the home with Buziak, but ultimately waited outside the property in his car when he arrived late to the showing. Buziak found a suitable property and arranged an appointment with the client to view the home at 5:30 p.m. on Saturday, February 2, 2008.

== Murder ==
Buziak and Zailo ate a late lunch at a restaurant, paying the bill at 4:24 p.m. They then departed separately in their own vehicles. It is believed that Buziak returned home to change her clothes before the viewing. Zailo travelled to an automobile repair shop to pick up a colleague, although he was running late. CCTV footage from the auto shop showed him leaving with the colleague at 5:30 p.m. Zailo and Buziak had exchanged several text messages and Buziak was aware that Zailo would be late.

The street upon which the house is located, De Sousa Place, is a small cul-de-sac containing four houses. The house she was found in was Number 1702 at the outer end of the cul-de-sac, on the intersection of De Sousa Place and a main thoroughfare, Torquay Drive. The side of the property and the fence of the back garden run parallel to Torquay Drive.

Although the caller had told Buziak that she would come alone to the viewing, a man and woman were there. At 5:30 p.m., two witnesses saw a six-foot-tall white man with dark hair and a blond-haired woman between 35 and 45 years of age, wearing a distinctively patterned dress, walking up the cul-de-sac. The witnesses saw Buziak greet and shake hands with the couple in a manner that caused witnesses to feel that Buziak did not know the couple. Buziak and the couple then entered the house.

Zailo and his colleague arrived at the cul-de-sac at about 5:40 p.m. As they were driving to the property, Zailo saw a figure through the glass of the front door. He parked outside the property for about 10 minutes and then drove to another street to wait, as he did not want to be "a nosy, interfering boyfriend." After waiting another 10 minutes, Zailo texted Buziak to confirm that the situation was normal, but Buziak never opened the message.

After 20 minutes had passed since Zailo had arrived and seen the couple go back into the house, Zailo went to the front door and found it locked when he tried to open it. Through the mottled glass on the front door, he saw Buziak's shoes in the entrance hall, but there was no sign of movement and no one answered his repeated knocks at the door, so he dialled 9-1-1. While Zailo was on the phone with the operator, his colleague found a gap in the fence in the back garden, entered the garden and saw that the back patio door was wide open. He summoned Zailo, who told the operator that the two men were entering the house. Zailo then ended the phone call.

Zailo's colleague passed through the main level of the house to unlock the front door in order to admit Zailo, who immediately ran upstairs and found Buziak lying in a pool of blood in the master bedroom. Zailo called 9-1-1 a second time and emergency services arrived soon after.

Buziak was pronounced dead when the paramedics arrived. She had been stabbed multiple times. There were no defensive wounds, indicating that it was likely that she had first been stabbed from behind and had no indication of what was about to happen. None of Buziak's possessions had been stolen and she had not been sexually assaulted.

== Investigation ==
Zailo and his colleague were taken into custody but were released without charge after their version of events was verified and the timestamped surveillance footage from the auto shop proved that they could not have committed the murder. According to the Saanich Police Department, Zailo has been interviewed several times over the years and has always cooperated with the police. He has also passed a polygraph test.

Because the crime scene yielded no DNA, fingerprints or any other physical evidence, it is believed that the murder was well-organised and executed by people who had killed before. The police believe that the killers were leaving through the front door when Zailo first arrived at the property and then fled through the back door, leaving the back patio door open and passing through the fence and to their vehicle on Torquay Drive. This scenario is consistent with the witnesses' statements that the unknown couple were walking, not driving, up the cul-de-sac, and the fact that the owners of all of the vehicles in the cul-de-sac were confirmed.

The cell phone used by the unknown woman to call Buziak was purchased in Vancouver several months before the murder and had never been used until the call was placed. It was activated under the name of Paulo Rodriguez, which authorities consider to be a fake name. It was registered to a legitimate business address in Vancouver, but it is believed that the business has no connection with the case and that its address was simply chosen at random. The phone was deactivated soon after the murder and has not been used since. Cell phone tower "pings" show that the phone travelled on the ferry from Vancouver the day before the murder. Authorities believe that the phone was used for the sole purpose of the murder and was discarded afterward, which supports their theory that the murder had been carefully planned.

Zailo's family were investigated because of their connections with the cul-de-sac. De Sousa Court is named after developer Joe De Sousa, a friend and business associate of Shirley Zailo, Jason's mother. Part of the cul-de-sac was still under construction at the time of the murder, and De Sousa was at the location an hour before the murder, supervising the construction work. However, the police have stated that no one in the Zailo family is a suspect.

In September 2010, the American network NBC aired a Dateline episode titled "Dream House Murder." Saanich detectives revealed that in December 2007, about eight weeks prior to her murder, Buziak tried to contact the friend of her ex-boyfriend while on a visit to Calgary. On January 22, 2008, the largest drug bust in Alberta's history took place and the friend was arrested, accused of being a major participant in the drug-trafficking operation. It was speculated that Buziak's murder may have been ordered by a drug cartel because she was believed to be a police informant. The detectives investigated that possibility but quickly eliminated it as a motive because Buziak was not an informant and the personal nature of her murder did not fit a hired killer's method of operation. Crime scene investigator Yolanda McClary and veteran homicide detective Dwayne Stanton agree that Buziak's murder was not a contracted operation related to a drug cartel, as it was brutal but too amateurish. The investigators believe that Buziak's murder was very personal and planned by someone close to her, perhaps by someone who had access to inside information from the real-estate office where she worked.

Speculation regarding another drug bust was also investigated as a link to Buziak's murder. One man's phone had been tapped because of his high level of involvement in the trafficking and sale of narcotics in British Columbia and Alberta. During the wiretaps, law enforcement uncovered information that led to the BC Legislature raids in 2003. Buziak's and her boyfriend's phones had also been tapped because of his association with the group. However, the theory was quickly dismissed because Buziak had no known involvement with drug use or trafficking and was not included in the defense's witness list during the trial.

== Later events ==
Later in 2008, Nikki, a close friend of Buziak, claimed that she had been awakened by a telephone call in the middle of the night from an unknown number. She did not remember much of what the female caller had said, but she noticed that the caller had a strange accent that she could not place. She became scared when she remembered that Buziak had reported that her unidentified client (and possible murderer) spoke with an odd accent that she believed may have been fake. After the phone call, Nikki called the originating phone number "20 or 30 times" until the call was answered by Shirley Zailo. Nikki asked Zailo why she had called her and how she had her number, as they did not know each other. Zailo replied that she had intended to call her secretary, also named Nikki, and that she did not know why the other Nikki's number was in her contact list. She presumed that her son Jason must have added it. Zailo denies that the event occurred, and it has not been publicly revealed whether Nikki's claim was investigated by the authorities.

In February each year, Buziak's father Jeff leads an annual walk in remembrance of her and to keep her case in the public eye.

In August 2017, a comment was posted on a message board at the investigative website run by Jeff Buziak stating: "I killed Lindsey [sic] and stupid cops will never prove it."

In 2020, the Capital Daily requested a release of public records relating to the case and reported previously unpublished information. The documents revealed that police had been aware of two phones used by the suspects; one with a Vancouver number only used to contact Buziak and another used to check the voicemail of the first phone. The information revealed there had been unusual Internet activity associated with Buziak before her murder, and that police initially suspected that "violent criminals" on her Facebook friends list "may have played a role" in the murder.

In February 2021, Saanich police announced that advancements in DNA analysis and other technology had created new leads in the case.

== See also ==
- List of unsolved murders in Canada
- List of unsolved murders (2000–present)
- Suzy Lamplugh, a British estate agent who disappeared during a scheduled property viewing in London. No trace of Lamplugh was ever found and the identity of the client viewing the property remains unknown.
