= Gary Allen Srery =

Canadian-American serial killer (1942–2011)

- Srery in 2009
- Born: July 26, 1942; Oak Park, Illinois, U.S.
- Died: April 27, 2011 (aged 68); Idaho State Correctional Center, Kuna, Idaho, U.S.
- Other names: Rex Edward Long, David Blackwell, Travis Blackwell, Gary Delorme and others
- Convictions: Petty theft (1961), rape, sodomy, kidnapping, oral copulation (1965), sexual assault (1998), rape (2009)
- Penalty: Life imprisonment (2009)

Details
- Victims: 4+
- Span of crimes: 1961–2007
- Country: Canada, United States
- States: Alberta, British Columbia, Washington, California, Idaho

Gary Allen Srery (July 26, 1942 – April 27, 2011) was an American rapist and serial killer who was responsible for murdering at least four women in Calgary, Alberta. Each victim was between the ages of 14 and 20 and were killed between February 1976 and February 1977, but the cases were only grouped together in 2021 through DNA evidence.

In May 2024, Srery was publicly identified as the killer after his identity was revealed through Investigative Genetic Genealogy by genealogists from Convergence Investigative Genetic Genealogy. He could not be charged, however, as he had died in 2011 in Idaho, where he was serving a life sentence for rape. At the time of the murders, Srery was illegally living in Canada while avoiding a rape charge in California.

== Early life ==
Srery was born the first of three siblings in Oak Park near Chicago, Illinois, but moved to California with his family in the mid-1950s. He subsequently married in California, had children, but divorced in 1969.

== Early criminal history ==
Srery's criminal record in the United States is extensive, particularly for violent and sexual offenses. While little is documented about Srery's early life, his criminal history in the United States shows he was involved in multiple sexual offences starting in the 1960s. His early criminal activity included a series of convictions for sexual assaults, starting with a forcible rape conviction in 1965. Over the next several years, he faced additional charges including kidnapping, sexual perversion, and burglary. In 1966, Srery was classified as a "mentally disordered sex offender" by the State of California, resulting in his commitment to mental health custody.

Despite periods of incarceration, Srery continued to face legal issues throughout the 1960s and early 1970s. In 1969, he was charged with rape in Los Angeles, though he was acquitted. Additional charges for drug possession later led to a stint in San Quentin prison. By 1973, he was charged with both kidnapping and sodomy in Oregon, but was again acquitted.

In 1974, Srery attacked a woman who was hitchhiking in the San Fernando Valley and sexually assaulted her in his car. Subsequently, he was caught by the police, and faced a rape charge in Los Angeles but was released on bail. Shortly after, he failed to appear in court and fled the United States, reportedly crossing into Canada illegally. The lack of digital records and limited cross-border data-sharing at the time allowed him to remain illegally in Canada. While in Canada, Srery lived as a drifter, primarily residing in Alberta and British Columbia, and worked in casual or under-the-table jobs, often as a cook or a salesman. Srery's mobility, use of aliases, switches of vehicles and an ever-changing appearance allowed him to avoid scrutiny from law enforcement during his time in Canada.

== Murders ==
- Eva Dvorak and Patricia McQueen, both 14, were murdered on February 14, 1976. Their bodies were discovered the next morning under the Happy Valley Overpass on Highway 1, west of Calgary. It was later determined they had been asphyxiated. Both girls were local to Calgary, Alberta and went to school at Ian Bazalgette Junior High School. They had been last seen strolling through downtown Calgary on the evening of their murders. It is reported that Eva's mother was devastated by the death of her daughter Eva, which happened just a few years after the death of her husband in 1972. Patricia, or Patsy as she was known, was one of 11 children and was said by her family to have been "full of life, adventure and curiosity" prior to her death.
- Melissa Ann Rehorek, 20, was murdered in September 1976. She was found in a ditch along a gravel road. She had been strangled and signs of a struggle were present on her body.
- Barbara Jean MacLean, 19, was murdered in February 1977. She left the Highlander Hotel after an argument with her boyfriend, and the next day her body was found. She was fully clothed but signs of a sexual assault were present.

== Later criminal history and deportation to the United States ==
Srery continued living in Canada until his arrest in 1998 in New Westminster, British Columbia, for a violent sexual assault. He was subsequently imprisoned in Canada, and upon completion of his sentence in 2003, he was deported to the United States.

Srery was eventually incarcerated in Idaho for another violent rape in Coeur d'Alene, Idaho. He had met the victim, who was on crutches, at a local bar and together travelled back to her house. Once they entered the home, he violently attacked her for several hours and her life was only spared when her boyfriend came home around 5 AM that morning and Srery subsequently escaped. The victim was said to have been significantly injured, suffering a stroke with limited mobility on her left side as a result. She would ultimately testify against him in trial for the assault, stating at a pivotal moment, "You damaged me... and I can't be repaired."

He remained in prison in Idaho, serving a life sentence, until his death from natural causes in 2011.

== See also ==
- List of serial killers by country
