= Frost ministry =

Cabinet of Ontario, 1949–1961

- ministry of Ontario

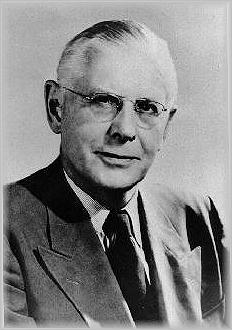
- The Hon. Leslie Miscampbell Frost
- Date formed: May 4, 1949
- Date dissolved: November 8, 1961

People and organizations
- Monarch: George VI (to 1952); Elizabeth II (from 1952)
- Lieutenant Governor: Ray Lawson (1949–52); Louis O. Breithaupt (1952–57); John Keiller MacKay (1957–61)
- Premier: Leslie Frost
- No. of ministers: 14 (at start), 22 (max.)
- Total no. of members: 39
- Member party: Progressive Conservative
- Status in legislature: Majority
- Opposition party: CCF (1949–51); Liberal (1951–61)
- Opposition leader: Ted Jolliffe (1949-1951); Farquhar Oliver (1951–58); John Wintermeyer (1958–61)

History
- Incoming formation: 1949 PC leadership convention
- Outgoing formation: resignation
- Elections: 1951, 1955, 1959
- Legislature term: 23rd, 24th, 25th & 26th; Parliaments of Ontario
- Predecessor: Drew ministry
- Successor: Robarts ministry

The Frost Ministry was the cabinet (formally the Executive Council of Ontario) of the Government of Ontario from May 4, 1949, to November 8, 1961. It was led by the 16th Premier of Ontario, Leslie Frost, nicknamed Old Man Ontario for his longevity in tenure. The council of ministers was made up of members of the Progressive Conservative Party of Ontario, which commanded a majority of the seats in the Legislative Assembly of Ontario throughout its duration.

The ministry was formed in 1949 following Frost's victory at the 1949 Progressive Conservative Party leadership convention. It succeeded the Drew-Henry ministry, in which Frost served as Treasurer and Minister of Mines for its entire duration. Frost succeeded cabinet colleague Thomas Kennedy who served as interim premier for the final six months of the Drew ministry.

The Progressive Conservative Party led by Frost contested the following three provincial general election, in 1951, 1955 and 1959, and won majority mandates in all three instances. The ministry governed through the latter part of the 23rd Parliament of Ontario, the entirety of the 24th and 25th Parliaments of Ontario, and the first half of the 26th Parliament of Ontario.

The Ontario ministry experienced a number of expansions during the Frost ministry, with the enactment of numerous new ministerial portfolios in response to the growth of commerce in the province.

The Frost ministry was the second of four ministries that were later collectively referred to as the Big Blue Machine, a forty-two year period of continual Progressive Conservative rule of the province. Frost resigned in 1961 and was succeeded by education minister John Robarts, who Frost promoted into cabinet less than three years prior.

== Initial composition ==
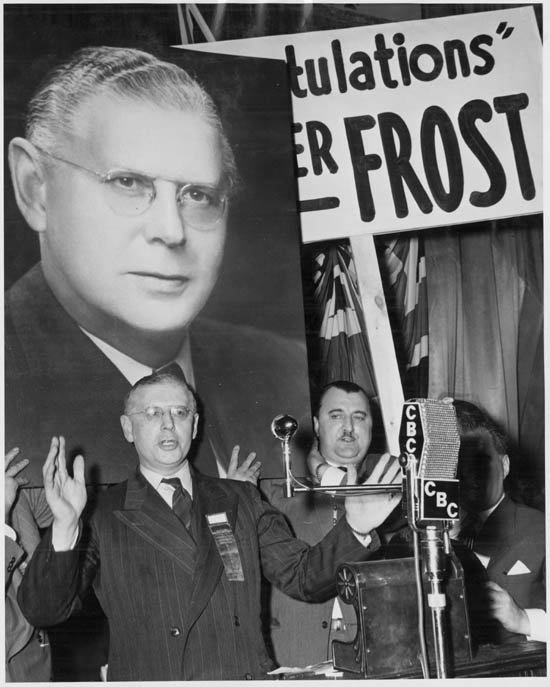
Premier-elect Leslie Front, upon his lopsided victory at the 1949 leadership convention

Despite fervent speculation of a major cabinet shakeup following Frost's victory at the 1949 Progressive Conservative leadership convention, the ascension of Frost to the premiership initially brought little change to the make up of the ministry. Press reports in the days that followed the convention forecasted four to five new faces for the new ministry. Among the speculated names were M. C. Davies (MPP for Windsor—Walkerville and Speaker of the legislature at the time), Welland Gemmell (Sudbury), William Hamilton (Wellington South), William Murdoch (Essex South). Mac Phillips (Grey North), and Tommy Thomas (Elgin). The departure of health minister Russell Kelley, who was in hospital following a heart attack, was also widely presumed.

When the new ministry members took their oath on May 4, 1949, only one new face were among them. Of the fourteen ministers who served under interim Premier Thomas Kennedy, all but one were retained, most of them continued to hold the same portfolios they held prior. Former Attorney General Leslie Blackwell, Frost's leadership rival and long time friend (Note: Despite Blackwell's profile as a prominent lawyer from Toronto, he is also from Lindsay.) who had rescinded his previous resignation from cabinet to enter the leadership contest, opted to retired as he had originally planned. was the only departure from cabinet. Dana Porter, another leadership rival, replaced Blackwell as Attorney General and retained the education portfolio. Porter was succeeded as Provincial Secretary by George Welch, who would also serve as chair of the Liquor Control Board of Ontario, with John Foote, a Victoria Cross decorated military chaplain, serving as vice chair. (Note: Foote would enter the ministry a year and a half later) Welch relinquished the planning and development portfolio (which he also inherited from Porter) to William Griesinger, previously a minister without portfolio. The only new minister, Welland Gemmell, succeeded Frost as Minister of Mines.

Of the seventeen ministerial departments, twelve retained their incumbent minister in the new ministry, including Frost himself at the treasury department. Health minister Russell Temple Kelley remained in cabinet despite reports of his ill health, his health so precarious that he remained in the hospital and missed the cabinet swearing-in. Seven departments had the same minister since the start of the Drew ministry in 1943. (Note: Frost at the treasury department, Thomas Kennedy at Department of Agriculture, George Dunbar at Department of Municipal Affairs and Department of Reform Institutions, George Doucett at Department of Public works and Department of Highways, and Charles Daley at Department of Labour) The new Premier indicated however that Porter and Dunbar, each heading two departments, would hold their respective education and reform institution portfolios on interim basis only, as he required more time to confirm the appointments of his preferred choices for those portfolios.

=== Designation of deputy ===
One significant change announced on the day the ministry entered office was that George Doucett, who was widely accepted as having been instrumental to Frost's lopsided leadership victory, was designated as deputy to the premier. Doucett was widely seen as a likely leadership contender upon Premier Drew’s departure. As highways minister he had travel extensively throughout the province and had build a robust network among the party grassroots. His decision not to enter the contest and to publicly back Frost not only helped Frost consolidate the key rural base, but more importantly, left Frost as the sole rival to three urbane Toronto candidates. Frost noted that Doucett would act as his "deputy both in and out of the house".

For much of the duration of the Frost ministry, Doucett was consistently seated to Frost right at cabinet, in the house, and at other key functions. He was occasionally referred to by the press as the Deputy Premier. While his standing as Frost's deputy was generally accepted and unquestioned, the title Deputy Premier did not appear on any formal instrument or government document however.

Composition of Frost Ministry, May 4, 1949
Portfolio	Minister	Held role since	First entered ministry
Prime Minister; President of the Council	Leslie Frost	May 4, 1949	August 17, 1943
Treasurer	Leslie Frost	August 17, 1943	August 17, 1943
Deputy Premier (Note: designation, not a portfolio; designation announced publicly, but the title was never formally conferred)	George Doucett	May 4, 1949	August 17, 1943
Minister of Public Works	George Doucett	August 17, 1943	August 17, 1943
Ministry of Highways	George Doucett	August 17, 1943	August 17, 1943
Minister of Agriculture	Thomas Laird Kennedy	(Note: Retained portfolio held Drew ministry from 1943; previously held role in 1930–34)August 17, 1943	September 16, 1930
Provincial Secretary and Registrar	George Arthur Welsh	May 4, 1949	March 25, 1946
Chair, Liquor Control Board of Ontario	George Arthur Welsh	May 4, 1949	March 25, 1946
Attorney General	Dana Porter	May 4, 1949	May 8, 1944
Minister of Education	Dana Porter	October 19, 1948	May 8, 1944
Minister of Municipal Affairs	George Dunbar	August 17, 1943	August 17, 1943
Minister of Reform Institutions	George Dunbar	April 15, 1946	August 17, 1943
Minister of Health	Russell Temple Kelley	January 7, 1946	January 7, 1946
Minister of Public Welfare	Bill Goodfellow	January 7, 1946	January 7, 1946
Minister of Labour	Charles Daley	August 17, 1943	August 17, 1943
Minister Travel and Publicity	Louis-Pierre Cécile	October 19, 1948	September 17,1948
Minister of Planning and Development	William Griesinger	May 4, 1949	April 15, 1946
Minister of Lands and Forests	Harold Robinson Scott	November 28, 1946	November 28, 1946
Minister of Mines	Welland Gemmell	May 4, 1949	May 4, 1949
Ministers Without Portfolios	George Holmes Challies	August 17, 1943	July 31, 1931
Vice Chair, Hydro Commission	George Holmes Challies	August 17, 1943	July 31, 1931

== Expansion of Ministry ==
=== Economy and government services ===
The Frost ministry saw the emergence of macro economic development and industrial policy as a distinct ministerial portfolio separated from the internal financial management function of the treasury department. In 1956 the Office of the Provincial Economist in the treasury department was established as the new Department of Economics. It was specifically mandated to study and advise on economic and financial policy, and fiscal relations between other levels of governments. The legislation did not provide for a separate ministerial position, but place the department in the Treasurer's charge. Furthermore, a new committee of cabinet members, known as the Treasury Board was established in 1958 to be chaired by the Treasurer. It was vested with the authority to approve spending requests from departmental ministers.

In the throne speech that opened the second session of the 26th Parliament in November 1960, the government signaled an increased focus on economic and industrial growth. A key feature of its plan was the establishment of a new department of commerce and development. Noting the increasing threats from developing European and Asian industries, the new department was given a mandate to search for new industries and new ways of selling Ontario goods in other countries and to identify solution to reduce the trade imbalance with the United States. A couple weeks later Premier Frost personally introduced legislations for these three departments reorganization. The enactment of those legislations in January 1961 resulted in the following changes:

- The economics department was renamed the Department of Economics and Federal and Provincial Relations, specifically tasked to handle the increasing load of intergovernmental functions beyond taxation issues
- The planning and development department, initially established for the purpose of postwar rehabilitation efforts, was renamed the Department of Commerce and Development with objectives to increase production, extend trade and formulate plans to create, assist. develop and maintain productive employment and to develop Ontario's human and material resources. In anticipation of its increased focus on industry and commerce, the department transferred its community planning branch to the municipal affairs department earlier in 1960. The department however retained the civil defence function, with its deputy minister Thomas Tyrrell, a brigade major with the Royal Canadian Engineers, being named head of the province Emergency Measures Organization.
- The Department of the Provincial Secretary and Registrar, in existence since before Canadian Confederation and one of the five provincial executive offices specifically established by the British North America Act, 1867, for the new province, was renamed Department of Provincial Secretary and Citizenship. In addition to its traditional functions in registration and central government administration, the department was given the high-minded objective to "in the cause of human betterment, advance and encourage the concept and ideal of full and equal citizenship among the residents of Ontario in order that all may exercise effectively the rights, powers and privileges and fulfil the obligations, duties and liabilities of citizens"

The two new economic departmental names did not last past the year end. They were amalgamated to form the new Department of Economics and Development in the early days of the Robarts ministry

=== Department of Energy Resources ===
The Department of Energy Resources was established in May, 1959.

=== Department of Transport ===
On July 1, 1957, legislation was passed to establish the Department of Transport. It assumed functions for motor vehicles (previously held by the Provincial Secretariat from 1903 to 1919, and the highways department from 1919) and other functions not directly related to constructions of transport infrastructures from the Department of Highways including driver licencing, traffic engineering and highway safety. Both departments remained in the charge of highways minister James Allen until Allen was promoted to be Treasurer the following year.

== Change in composition ==
In the early years of the ministry, Frost approached changes to his cabinet line-up in similar ways as most of his predecessors, making small and targeted changes as events occurred. There were no discernable effort toward major shuffles at any point. It was also routine for senior ministers who relinquished their portfolios voluntarily to be retained by Frost as ministers without portfolio for extended periods of time. Wider-scope shuffles impacting multiple ministers and departments occurred only three times under Frost, twice in 1958.

- August 17, 1955 - two ministers without portfolio retired from cabinet, seven ministers changes portfolio (including Frost relinquishing the Treasury portfolio he held since 1943 to Dana Porter), two new ministers promoted (including former leadership rival/future leadership frontrunner Kelso Roberts as Attorney General)
- April 24, 1958 (Note: The Legislative Assembly website erroneously recorded the date as April 28, 1958, likely an error reproduced from the authoratative Legislators and Legislatures of Ontario which contains the same error. News outlet all reported the shuffled on April 26, 1958.) - Four days after the opposition Liberals elected a youthful MPP John Wintermeyer (who was 41) over former federal finance minister Walter Harris, Frost shuffled his cabinet and made specific effort to highlight the younger ministers being promoted. Three new ministers, all in their earlier forties or late thirties entered cabinet (including John Yaremko, who would go on to serve under three premiers), while two other incumbent ministers also in early forties were given promotion along with the new Treasurer James Allen.
- December 22, 1958 - long time deputy to Frost George Doucett resigned over a rapidly-spreading scandal in the highways department, leading a sweeping shuffle with six ministers changing portfolios. Four new ministers were promoted, including John Robarts, who would succeed Frost as premier in less than three years. When Robarts formed his new cabinet, only two incumbent ministers would be dropped, and they were both among the other three new entrants on this day.

=== Early additions and changes ===
Some of the speculations at the start of the ministry in May 1949 were not entirely unfulfilled, but merely delayed, some by over two years. Frost's preferred education minister – wildly assumed to be Speaker M. C. Davies – did not materialize however.

William Hamilton was elevated to cabinet and assumed the reform institutions portfolio from Dunbar in July. The next change took place a year later, when Dr. Mac Phillips succeeded the ailing health minister Russell Kelley in August 1950 as widely expected. Welfare minister Bill Goodfellow had been acting health minister during Kelley extended absence, was reportedly concerned about workload given the pending old-age security negotiation with Ottawa. Kelley remained in cabinet as a minister without portfolio until after his retirement from the legislature in the 1951 election, and died shortly after in February 1952. Hamilton's tenure as a portfolio minister was brief. In November 1950 he resigned in order to become the head of Paul Revere Life Insurance Co. newly established operation in Canada. He was replaced by John Foote as Minister of Reform Institutions, but was retained as a minister without portfolio until after his departure from the legislature at the 1955 election.

Frost elevated two new member into ministry following the 1951 elections, reliving two senior ministers form double-duty and finalizing moves outstanding form his ministry formation in 1949. Tommy Thomas, who has been subject of cabinet speculation for over two years, took over from Deputy Premier Doucett the public works portfolio, one of two portfolios Doucett held since 1943. William James Dunlop, a newly elected members and former University of Toronto professor, was named education minister, relieving Dana Porter from over two years of carrying the Attorney General and education portfolio, two of the most significant ministerial portfolios, concurrently.

One new minister was elevated in each of the following three years: Philip Kelly as Minister of Mines in 1952, Bill Warrender as Minister of Planning and Development in 1953, and Clare Mapledoram as Minister of Lands and Forests in 1954. Warrender's entry was triggered by the retirement from cabinet its dean the former premier Thomas Kennedy in anticipation of turning seventy-five that year. Kennedy declined to remain as a minister without portfolio but continued to serve in the legislature for another seven years until his death in 1959.

In early 1958, Treasurer Dana Porter was appointed by the federal government as Chief Justice of Ontario, leading to Frost briefly resuming the portfolio he held for over a decade briefly for three months, before transferring the powerful role to James Allan in the April 1958 shuffle.

=== Forced departures ===
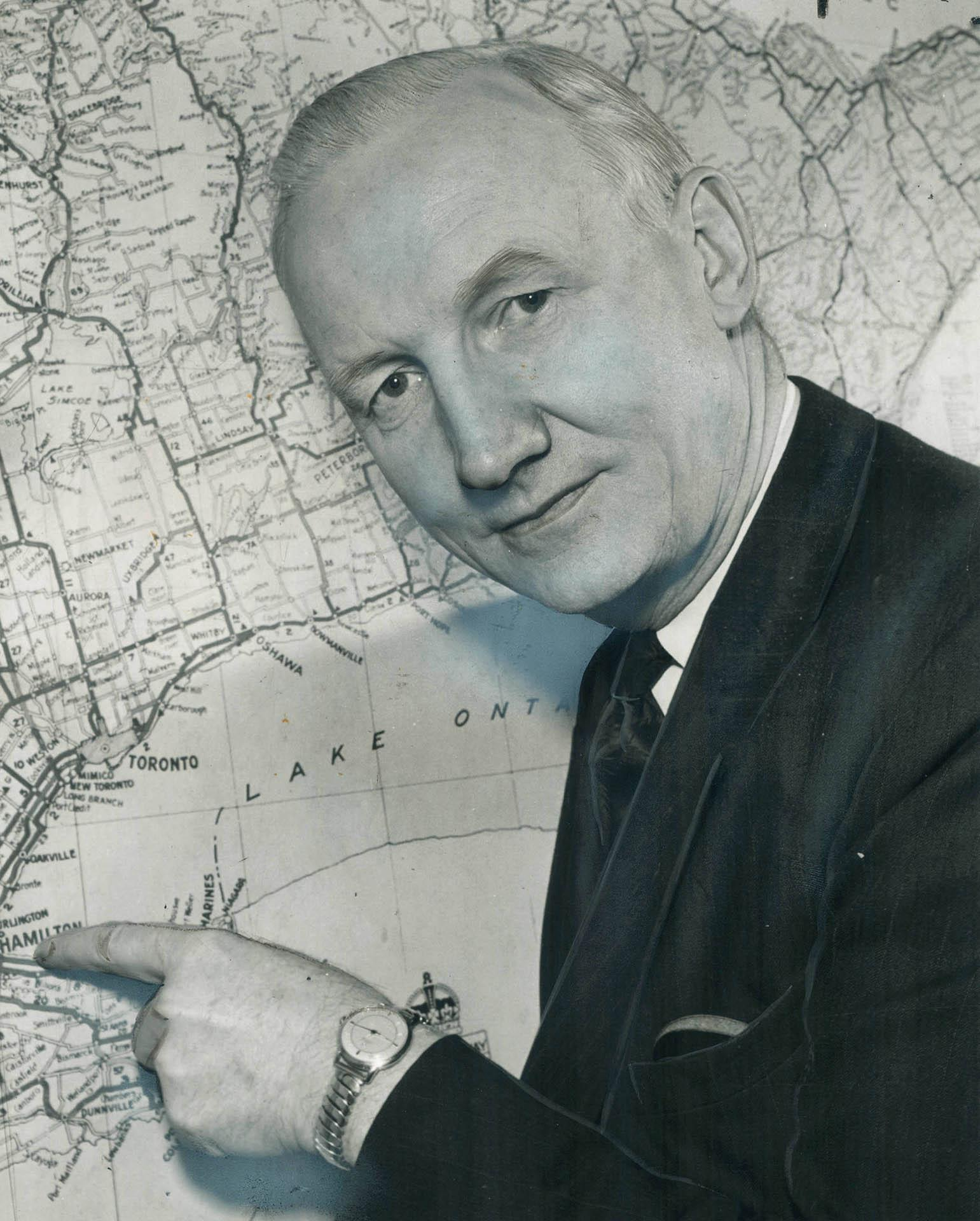
Deputy Premier George Doucett

Two separate scandals claimed casualties from the Frost ministers in the mid 1950s.

The first scandal, involving substantial road-building frauds, implicated no ministers personally but dealt a body blow to the premier by claiming deputy premier George Doucett, an important ally who was also a key power broker within the governing party. In 1953-54 the scandal broke from the highways department with reports of officials facilitating bid-rigging by construction companies, construction plan tempering, fraudulent billings, and irregular payments in various directions numbered in millions. As the scandal grew, the provincial auditor unveiled other financial misconducts such as accepting kickbacks or inappropriate gifts, while less serious, were rampant in the department due to lack of proper oversight of major procurement. Frost initially tried to contain the matter by diverting opposition’s demand for a royal commission to a select committee. Nonetheless, the position of Doucett and his deputy minister became untenable as the number of dismissed officials piled up and charged for fraud and conspiracy were laid. The situation was further complicated by the animosity harboured by the party's Toronto power broker toward Doucett. Despite not personally implicated, Doucett resigned in January 1955 on account of ministerial responsibility, ending an eleven-year tenure overseeing some of the most rapid building out of the province highway network.

Another scandal two years later rocked the ministry much more seriously, implicating three ministers personally for profiting from inappropriate investment opportunities. The furor over the Northern Ontario natural gas pipeline stock broke in 1957 when it was disclosed that politicians at all levels were from many communities along the pipeline from western Canada had been given special opportunities to purchase stock options at bargain price in a project underwritten by the taxpayers' money and approved by the Provincial Secretary, grew by over two hundred folds in matters of months. Minister of Mines Philip Kelly initially denied any interest in the company, but as more and more information was revealed, more and more of his denial were proven untrue. He eventually admitted having made a large amount of money on speculations but insisted it was an "honest investment" as he has no say on the routing of the pipelines. As Kelly faced increasing heat, it as also revealed that he also ushered in others in the legislature into the company's investor roster, including newly elected Liberal leader John Westermeyer, public works minister William Griesinger and lands and forest minister Clare Mapledoram, all having profited during the relevant period. Frost instinctively saw the perils posed for the party and the heat the issue was creating. While he insisted at the time that Kelly resigned voluntarily in preparation for a federal run, Queen's Park insiders told a version which Kelly's resignation letter was typed out for him on which the Premier demanded Kelly's signature. Frost also forced the resignations of Griesinger and Mapledoram for not divesting when they were instructed to. In commenting on the matter years after leaving office, Frost clearly see Kelly as the primary culprit for bringing discredit on the government, for damaging the careers of two promising ministers and an opposition leader he actually liked at a personal level, and for causing him "more anxiety and distress than any other incident in my long public life."

== Notable facts ==
Thirty-nine men served in the ministry over its twelve years tenure. Thirteen of the fourteen initial ministers served in the predecessor Drew ministry. The most senior member, Thomas Kennedy, Frost immediate predecessor as Premier, first served in cabinet in 1930, and have served under three other earlier premiers. George Holmes Challies, entered cabinet a year after Kennedy, was the only other member with cabinet experience from prior to the Drew ministry.

Aside from Frost, three ministers – Charles Daley, Bill Goodfellow and Louis-Pierre Cécile – started their cabinet career in the Drew ministry and served for the entire duration of the Frost ministry. All three went on to serve in the succeeding Robarts ministry.

Frost and Daley were among six ministers who held onto the same portfolios through Drew ministry's six-year tenure. Daley was however the only member of the Frost ministry to have helmed a department for its entire twelve-year duration. His combined eighteen-year tenure as labour minister not only made him Ontario's longest-serving labour minister, it is also put him in third place for Ontario ministerial portfolio longevity, behind only Sir Oliver Mowat's twenty-four-year tenure as Attorney General in his own ministry, and the twenty-year tenure of Mowat's public works minister Christopher Fraser..

Aside from Daley, four members of the Frost ministry hold the distinction as the longest serving minister of other portfolios:

- Health - Dr. Matthew Dymond served eleven years as health minister, the first three in the Frost ministry
- Municipal Affairs - George Dunbar helmed the Department of Municipal Affairs for twelve years to the day
- Highways - Despite having his cabinet tenure cut short by a departmental scandal, George Doucett's eleven-year tenure as highways minister remains to date the longest for the portfolio inclusive of the successor transportation portfolio (Note: It would however not be the longest tenure among the ministers who helmed infrastructure and public works portfolio. Christopher Fraser served as public works minister for twenty years between 1874 and 1894.)
- Finance - Premier Forst himself also hold one of the portfolio records. With close to six years served in the portfolio in the Drew ministry, Frost held on to the portfolio for another six years, and arranged for a small scale shuffle on the twelve-year anniversary date to hand over the crucial portfolio to Dana Porter. His service was however unexpectedly extended by a few months when Porter was summoned to the role of the province's chief justice.

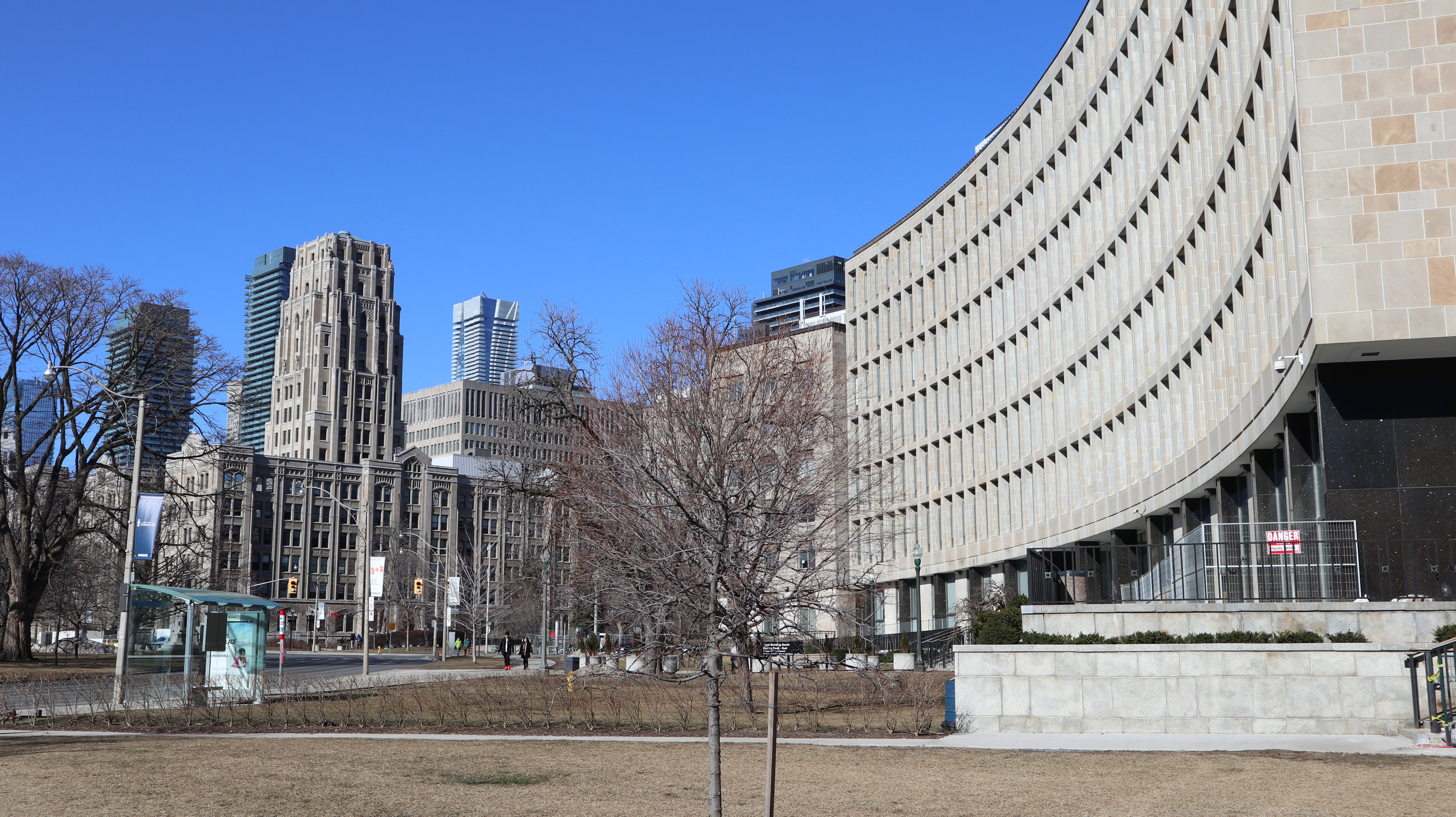
The Frost Building, in the foreground, with Whitney Block in the background.

Premier Frost lengthy attachment to the treasury portfolio may explain why the office complex on the south east side of Queen's Park Crescent that houses the finance ministry and the Treasury Board Secretariat, completed in 1966, and was named the Frost Building.

Coincidently, the ministry's most senior and most junior member each held the agriculture portfolio for more than thirteen years, though neither had the distinction of being the longest serving minister. When former premier Thomas Kennedy retired from cabinet in 1953 upon reaching the age of seventy-five, his thirteen years (non-consecutive) made him the second longest serving agriculture minister. (Note: Second to John Dryden who held the portofolio in the Mowat, Hardy, and Ross ministries.) By the time William Atcheson Stewart enter the Frost ministry, the last person to do so, Kennedy had already pass away. Stewart bumped Kennedy from his place as the second longest serving agriculture minister in 1975.

Nineteen members of the Frost ministry would continue to serve in the successor Robarts ministry, and three — John Yaremko, Allan Grossman and William Atcheson Stewart — would go on to serve in the Davis ministry after that. All three opted to retired at the 1975 election. Accordingly, no member of the Frost ministry had to endure time in opposition after their ministerial service.

== List of ministers ==
Involuntary, unplanned departure (e.g. death, resignation due to poor health, resignation requested by premier)
Retained portfolio from Drew-Kennedy ministry/at the start of Robarts ministry
Continued service from Drew-Kennedy ministry/in the Robarts ministry in different portfolio
Did not continue in the Robarts ministry
Drew-Kennedy ministry
Frost ministry
Robarts ministry

=== List of ministers ordered by seniority ===
Minister	Ministerial service			Parliamentary service			Note
Minister	Start	End	Timespan	1st	Electoral district	Region	Note
Leslie Frost	August 17, 1943	Nov 8, 1961		1937	Victoria	Central East	
Thomas Kennedy	Sep 16, 1930; August 17, 1943	Jan 20, 1953		1919	Peel	Central	(Note: Former premier; member of Ferguson, Henry, and Drew ministries)
George Challies	July 31, 1931; August 17, 1943	August 17, 1955		1929	Grenville—Dundas	East	(Note: Member of Henry & Drew ministries)
George Doucett	August 17, 1943	January 5, 1955		1937	Lanark	East	
George Dunbar	August 17, 1943	Dec 22, 1958		1937	Ottawa South	East	
Dana Porter	August 17, 1943	January 30, 1958		1943	St. George	Toronto	
Charles Daley	August 17, 1943	October 25, 1962		1943	Lincoln	Central West	
Bill Goodfellow	January 7, 1946	October 25, 1962		1943	Northumberland	Central East	
Russell Temple Kelley	January 7, 1946	January 18, 1952		1945	Hamilton—Wentworth	Central West	
George Arthur Welsh	March 25, 1946	Jan 20, 1955		1945	Muskoka–Ontario	Central	
William Griesinger	April 15, 1946	May 6, 1958		1945	Windsor—Sandwich	Southwest	(Note: Resignation - one of three ministry members implicated in the Northern Ontario Natural Gas stock option scandal.)
Harold Scott	Nov 28, 1946	April 28, 1958		1943	Peterborough	Central East	
Louis-Pierre Cécile	Sep 17, 1948	Nov 24, 1966		1948	Prescott	East	
Welland Gemmell	May 4, 1949	June 18, 1954		1948	Sudbury	North	(Note: Died in office)
William Ernest Hamilton	July 15, 1949	August 17, 1955		1945	Wellington South	Central West	
Mac Phillips	August 8, 1950	May 15, 1960		1945	Gray North	Southwest	
John Weir Foote	Nov 16, 1950	July 18, 1957		1948	Durham	Central	
Tommy Thomas	October 2, 1951	August 1, 1956		1945	Elgin	Southwest	
William James Dunlop	October 2, 1951	Nov 21, 1960		1951	Eglinton	Toronto	
Philip Kelly	June 3, 1952	July 18, 1957		1951	Cochrane North	North	
Bill Warrender	Jan 20, 1953	October 25, 1962		1951	Hamilton Centre	Central West	
Clare Mapledoram	July 7, 1954	July 4, 1958		1951	Fort William	North	
James Allan	January 5, 1955	Jan 31, 1968		1951	Haldimand—Norfolk	Central West	
William McAdam Nickle	Jan 20, 1955	October 25, 1962		1951	Kingston	East	
Bryan Cathcart	August 17, 1955	August 14, 1963		1945	Lambton West	Southwest	
Kelso Roberts	August 17, 1955	Nov 24, 1966		1943	SI. Patrick	Toronto	
Ray Connell	Nov 1, 1956	June 5, 1969		1951	Hamilton—Wentworth	Central West	
Matthew Dymond	July 18, 1957	August 13, 1969		1955	Ontario	Central East	
Wilf Spooner	July 18, 1957	Nov 23, 1967		1955	Cochrane South	North	
Robert Macaulay	April 28, 1958	October 16, 1963		1951	Riverdale	Toronto	
John Yaremko	April 28, 1958	Feb 26, 1974		1951	Bellwoods	Toronto	
Frederick Cass	April 28, 1958	March 23, 1964		1955	Grenville—Dundas	East	
John Robarts	Dec 22, 1958	March 1, 1971		1951	London North	Southwest	
John Henry Haines Root	Dec 22, 1958	Nov 8, 1961		1951	Wellington-Dulferin	Central West	
George Wardrope	Dec 22, 1958	Nov 23, 1967		1951	Port Arthur	North	
James Anthony Maloney	Dec 22, 1958	Nov 8, 1961		1956	Renfrew South	East	
Allan Grossman	Nov 21, 1960	October 7, 1975		1955	St. Andrew	Toronto	
Leslie Rowntree	Nov 21, 1960	February 5, 1970		1956	York West	Toronto (Note: Metro Toronto)	
William Atcheson Stewart	Nov 21, 1960	October 7, 1975		1957	Middlesex North	Southwest	

=== List of ministers by portfolio ===
Portfolio	Minister	Tenure	
Portfolio	Minister	Start	End
Central administration portfolios
Prime Minister (Note: Ontario Premier was styled as "Prime Minister of Ontario" between 1907 and 1972); President of the Council	Leslie Frost	May 4, 1949	November 8, 1961
Deputy Premier	George Doucett	May 4, 1949	January 5, 1955
Treasurer (Note: while not yet a ministerial portfolio, the Treasury Board was instituted in March 1958 as a committee of ministers, with the Treasurer as chair ex officio.) (from March 28, 1956) - Treasurer and Minister In Charge of the Department of Economics (from January 27, 1961) - Treasurer and Minister of Federal and Provincial Relations	Leslie Frost	(Note: Retained portfolio held in Drew Ministry since 1943) May 4, 1949	August 17, 1955
Treasurer (from March 28, 1956) - Treasurer and Minister In Charge of the Department of Economics (from January 27, 1961) - Treasurer and Minister of Federal and Provincial Relations	Dana Porter	August 17, 1955	January 30, 1958
Treasurer (from March 28, 1956) - Treasurer and Minister In Charge of the Department of Economics (from January 27, 1961) - Treasurer and Minister of Federal and Provincial Relations	Leslie Frost	February 3, 1958	April 28, 1958
Treasurer (from March 28, 1956) - Treasurer and Minister In Charge of the Department of Economics (from January 27, 1961) - Treasurer and Minister of Federal and Provincial Relations	James Allan	April 28, 1958	November 8, 1961
Provincial Secretary and Registrar (from January 27, 1961) (Note: Department renamed by legislaation enacted on January 27, 1961); Provincial Secretary and Minister of Citizenship	George Arthur Welsh	May 4, 1949	January 20, 1955
Provincial Secretary and Registrar (from January 27, 1961); Provincial Secretary and Minister of Citizenship	William McAdam Nickle	January 20, 1955	August 17, 1955
Provincial Secretary and Registrar (from January 27, 1961); Provincial Secretary and Minister of Citizenship	George Dunbar	August 17, 1955	December 22, 1958
Provincial Secretary and Registrar (from January 27, 1961); Provincial Secretary and Minister of Citizenship	Mac Phillips	December 22, 1958	May 26, 1960
Provincial Secretary and Registrar (from January 27, 1961); Provincial Secretary and Minister of Citizenship	John Yaremko	May 26, 1960	November 8, 1961
Minister of Municipal Affairs	George Dunbar	May 4, 1949	August 17, 1955
Minister of Municipal Affairs	Bill Goodfellow	August 17, 1955	November 1, 1956
Minister of Municipal Affairs	Bill Warrender	November 1, 1956	November 8, 1961
Law and order portfolios
Attorney General	Dana Porter	May 4, 1949	August 17, 1955
Attorney General	Kelso Roberts	August 17, 1955	November 8, 1961
Minister of Reform Institutions	George Dunbar	May 4, 1949	July 15, 1949
Minister of Reform Institutions	William Ernest Hamilton	July 15, 1949	November 16, 1950
Minister of Reform Institutions	John Weir Foote	November 16, 1950	July 18, 1957
Minister of Reform Institutions	Matthew Dymond	July 18, 1957	April 28, 1958
Minister of Reform Institutions	Ray Connell	April 28, 1958	December 22, 1958
Minister of Reform Institutions	George Wardrope	December 22, 1958	November 8, 1961
Public assets portfolios
Minister of Public Works	George Doucett	May 4, 1949	October 2, 1951
Minister of Public Works	Tommy Thomas	October 2, 1951	January 20, 1953
Minister of Public Works	William Griesinger	January 20, 1953	May 6, 1958
Minister of Public Works	James Allan	May 14, 1958	December 22, 1958
Minister of Public Works	Ray Connell	December 22, 1958	November 8, 1961
Ministry of Highways	George Doucett	May 4, 1949	January 5, 1955
Ministry of Highways	James Allan	January 5, 1955	April 28, 1958
Ministry of Highways	Fred Cass	April 28, 1958	November 8, 1961
Minister of Transport (Note: Department established on June 26, 1957 by legislation>)	James Allan	June 26, 1957	April 28, 1958
Minister of Transport	Matthew Dymond	April 28, 1958	December 22, 1958
Minister of Transport	John Yaremko	December 22, 1958	November 21, 1960
Minister of Transport	Leslie Rowntree	November 21, 1960	November 8, 1961
Social & human services portfolios
Minister of Education	Dana Porter	(Note: Retained portfolio held in Drew Ministry since 1948) May 4, 1949	October 2, 1951
Minister of Education	William James Dunlop	October 2, 1951	December 17, 1959
Minister of Education	John Robarts	December 17, 1959	November 8, 1961
Minister of Health	Russell Temple Kelley	(Note: Retained portfolio held in Drew Ministry since 1946) May 4, 1949	August 8, 1950
Minister of Health	Mac Phillips	August 8, 1950	December 22, 1958
Minister of Health	Matthew Dymond	December 22, 1958	November 8, 1961
Minister of Public Welfare	Bill Goodfellow	May 4, 1949	August 17, 1955
Minister of Public Welfare	Louis-Pierre Cécile	August 17, 1955	November 8, 1961
Minister of Labour	Charles Daley	May 4, 1949	November 8, 1961
Natural resources portfolios
Minister of Lands and Forests	Harold Robinson Scott	May 4, 1949	June 3, 1952
Minister of Lands and Forests	Welland Gemmell	June 3, 1952	June 18, 1954
Minister of Lands and Forests	Clare Mapledoram	July 7, 1954	July 4, 1958
Minister of Lands and Forests	Wilf Spooner	July 4, 1958	November 8, 1961
Minister of Mines	Welland Gemmell	May 4, 1949	June 3, 1952
Minister of Mines	Philip Kelly	June 3, 1952	July 18, 1957
Minister of Mines	Wilf Spooner	July 18, 1957	December 22, 1958
Minister of Mines	James Anthony Maloney	December 22, 1958	November 8, 1961
Ministers Without Portfolios (with desgination as a Hydro Commissioner)	George Holmes Challies	May 4, 1949	August 17, 1955
Ministers Without Portfolios (with desgination as a Hydro Commissioner)	Bill Warrender	August 17, 1955	November 1, 1956
Ministers Without Portfolios (with desgination as a Hydro Commissioner)	Ray Connell	November 1, 1956	April 28, 1958
Ministers Without Portfolios (with desgination as a Hydro Commissioner)	Robert Macaulay	May 26, 1958	May 5, 1959
Minister of Energy Resources (Note: Department established on May 5, 1959 by legislation)	Robert Macaulay	May 5, 1959	November 8, 1961
Economic portfolios
Minister of Agriculture	Thomas Laird Kennedy	May 4, 1949	January 20, 1953
Minister of Agriculture	Tommy Thomas	January 20, 1953	August 1, 1956
Minister of Agriculture	Bill Goodfellow	August 1, 1956	November 8, 1961
Minister Travel and Publicity	Louis-Pierre Cécile	May 4, 1949	August 17, 1955
Minister Travel and Publicity	Bryan Lewis Cathcart	August 17, 1955	November 8, 1961
Minister of Planning and Development (from January 27, 1961); Minister of Commerce and Development	William Griesinger	May 4, 1949	January 20, 1953
Minister of Planning and Development (from January 27, 1961); Minister of Commerce and Development	Bill Warrender	January 20, 1953	August 17, 1955
Minister of Planning and Development (from January 27, 1961); Minister of Commerce and Development	William McAdam Nickle	August 17, 1955	November 8, 1961
Ministers without portfolios
Ministers Without Portfolios	Russell Temple Kelley	August 8, 1950	January 18, 1952
Ministers Without Portfolios	William Ernest Hamilton	November 16, 1950	August 17, 1955
Ministers Without Portfolios	Harold Scott	June 3, 1952	April 28, 1958
Ministers Without Portfolios	John Yaremko	April 28, 1958	December 22, 1958
Ministers Without Portfolios	John Henry Haines Root	December 22, 1958	November 8, 1961
Ministers Without Portfolios	John Robarts	December 22, 1958	December 17, 1959
Ministers Without Portfolios	William James Dunlop	December 17, 1959	November 21, 1960
Ministers Without Portfolios	Allan Grossman	November 21, 1960	November 8, 1961
Ministers Without Portfolios	William Atcheson Stewart	November 21, 1960	November 8, 1961
