= Drew ministry (Ontario) =

Cabinet of Ontario, 1943–1949

- ministry of Ontario

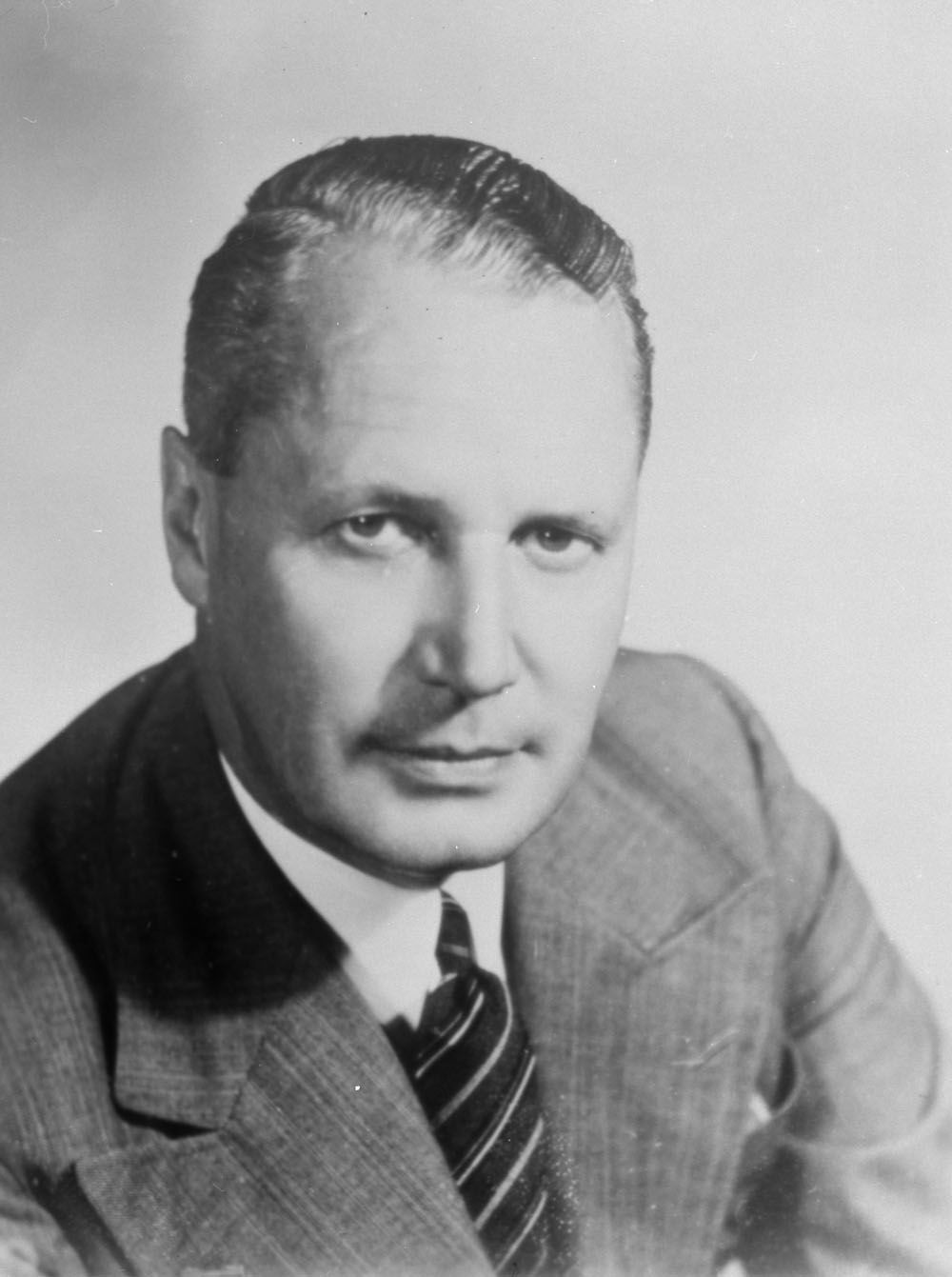
- The Hon. George A. Drew
- Date formed: August 17, 1943
- Date dissolved: May 4, 1949

People and organisations
- Monarch: George VI (1948-1949)
- Lieutenant Governor: Albert E. Matthews (1943–46); Ray Lawson (1946–49)
- Premier: George A. Drew (1943–48); Thomas Kennedy (1948–49)
- No. of ministers: 17 (maximum)
- Total no. of members: 19
- Member party: Progressive Conservative
- Status in legislature: Minority (1943–45); Majority (1945–48)
- Opposition party: CCF, Liberal
- Opposition leader: Ted Jolliffe, CCF (1943-1945, 1948–49); Farquhar Oliver, Liberal (1945-1948)

History
- Incoming formation: 1943 election
- Outgoing formation: 1949 PC leadership
- Elections: 1943, 1945
- Legislature term: 21st Parliament of Ontario 22nd Parliament of Ontario
- Predecessor: Hepburn ministry
- Successor: Frost ministry

The Drew ministry, formally speaking the Drew-Kennedy ministry, was the cabinet that directed the Ontario provincial government (formally the Executive Council of Ontario) from August 17, 1943, to May 4, 1949. It was composed and led for the five of its six-year tenure by the 14th Premier of Ontario, George Drew. Agriculture minister Thomas Laird Kennedy, the most senior member of the ministry having first been elected in 1919, succeeded Drew and presided over the ministry for its final six months during the 1949 Progressive Conservative Party leadership contest that elected Treasurer Leslie Frost as the new party leader and head of the successor Frost ministry.

The ministry was made up of members of the Progressive Conservative Party of Ontario. It replaced the Hepburn-Conant-Nixon ministry, a Liberal government that had been in power since 1934 and led by Harry Nixon for its final three months, at the 1943 Ontario general election. The Drew ministry governed through the 21st Parliament as a minority government in the Legislative Assembly of Ontario, and secured majority electoral mandates for the 22nd and 23rd Parliaments of Ontario.

== Composition and changes ==
=== Initial composition ===
The Drew ministry initially consist of ten members, including four members of who were elected for the first time in the 1943 election. Of the six members who have served in opposition, two members, Tom Kennedy and George Challies, had previous cabinet experience.

When Drew ministry took office, there were fourteen ministerial portfolios. Five of the ten ministers held two portfolios initially, including Drew himself, who served concurrently as Prime Minister of Ontario (the official title of the office at the time) and education minister. Leslie Frost, who served concurrently as Treasurer and mining minister, held both role for the entire duration of the ministry and continue to serve as Treasurer upon becoming party leader and Premier. George Doucett, who served concurrently as highways minister and public works minister, also held both portfolio throughout and continued heading those departments in the Frost ministry. Challies served as a minister without portfolio.

Portfolio	Minister
Prime Minister & President of the Council	George A. Drew
Education	George A. Drew
Attorney General	Leslie Blackwell
Provincial Secretary & Registrar	George Dunbar
Minister of Municipal Affairs	George Dunbar
Treasurer	Leslie Frost
Minister of Mines	Leslie Frost
Minister of Agriculture	Thomas Laird Kennedy
Minister of Health	Percy Vivian
Minister of Public Welfare	Percy Vivian
Minister of Highways	George Doucett
Minister of Public Works	George Doucett
Minister of Labour	Charles Daley
Minister of Lands and Forests	Wesley Thompson
Ministers without portfolios	George Holmes Challies

=== Growth of provincial administration ===
During the Drew ministry, the Ontario government further expanded with three more portfolios. The Department of Planning and Development was established in 1944 to coordinate the rehabilitation efforts following the World War II and evolved over a few decades to become the primary department with responsibility over economic development and industry. (Note: Created by The Department of Planning and Development Act, 1944, enacted on March 14, 1944.) Two additional departments were created in 1946 as a result of elevation of the reformatory and prisons branch in the Provincial Secretary department to ministerial portfolio as the Department of Reform Institutions (Note: Created by The Department of Reform Institutions Act, 1946, enacted on March 27, 1946.) (predecessor of the later solicitor general, correctional services, and public safety ministries) and the travel and publicity bureau in the treasury department as Department of Travel and Publicity (predecessor of the later tourism, culture and communications ministries). (Note: Created by The Department of Travel and Publicity Act, 1946, enacted on March 27, 1946.) With the three new department, the total number of ministerial portfolios grew to seventeen.

=== Changes and Departures ===
The make up of the Drew ministry saw very few changes. There were no departure or shuffle of assignments for the entire duration of the 21st Parliament when the ministry was in a minority position. Two new member entered cabinet during that period. In May 1944, Dana Porter was named Minister of Planning and Development to head the newly created department. William Webster was made a minister without portfolio in December the same year, for the purpose of chairing the Liquor Control Board of Ontario.

There were only two resignation from the ministry, both took place in 1946. Ten days after the June 1945 election, McGill University announced that Dr. Percy Vivian, who was health and public welfare minister at the time, will be the next chair of its health and social medicine department. Drew initially announced that he planned to conduct a comprehensive cabinet shuffle after legislation were enacted to create two new departments and that Vivian had agreed to remain in office until then. The matter however remained unresolved, with Vivian having commenced his academic position in Montreal while holding on to those portfolios.

Instead of a comprehensive shuffle, the changes took place in three installments in early 1946. Vivian was finally relieved of his duty seven months after the initial announcement when new ministers Bill Goodfellow and Russell Kelley entered cabinet in January and assumed his public welfare and health portfolios respectively. When legislations for two new departments were finally enacted in March, only one had a new minister, George Welsh, was sworn in as Minister of Travel and Publicity. In April, Provincial Secretary George Dunbar, who had responsibility for prisons within his portfolio was named minister for the new Department of Reform Institution, while members elected in the 1945 election, Roland Michener and William Griesinger, entered cabinet as Provincial Secretary and minister without portfolio.

The only other resignation from the ministry came later that year, when lands and forests minister Wesley Gardiner Thompson stepped down in November to devote more time to his private business. He was replaced by new minister Harold Robinson Scott. Following the entrance of Scott, the composition of the ministry remained unchanged until after the 1948 election.

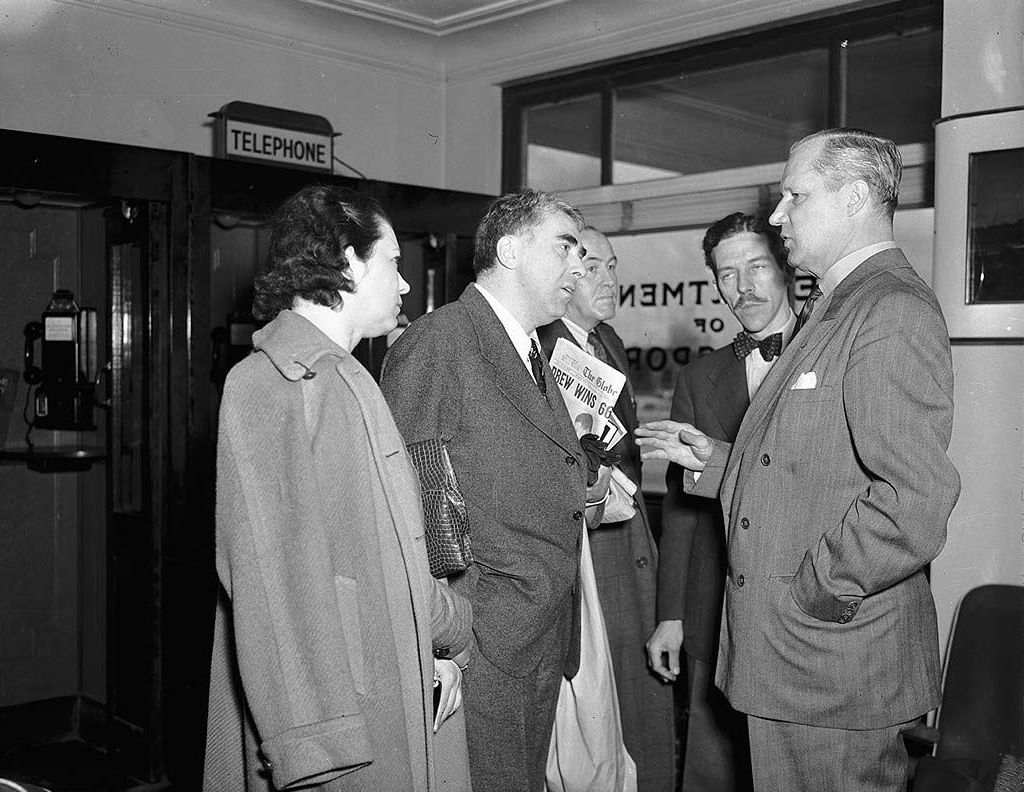
George Drew (right) in the offices of the Ontario Department of Transportation the day after his party's election victory in 1948

== 1948 transition ==
In the 1948 general election, the Progressive Conservatives led by Drew secured another majority victory, despite losing a fifth of its seats, most of them in or around the City of Toronto. Three members of cabinet were among the casualties — William Webster in London, Roland Michener in St. David (Toronto), and Drew himself in High Park by a concerted challenge by the Cooperative Commonwealth Federation. To date he is the only Ontario Premier to have lost his own seat while winning re-election.

With a renewed electoral mandate, Drew initially appeared that he would continue as premier and simply seek a by-election. There were no shortage of caucus members willing to vacate their seats for the premier, first among them his lieutenant Tom Kennedy. Instead of contesting a by-election, he opt to depart from provincial politics and successfully contested the leadership of the Progressive Conservative Party of Canada by defeating Saskatchewan MP John Diefenbaker, the future prime minister, at the leadership convention on October 2, 1948. Drew made one more change to his ministry just days he announced his bid for national party leadership however, promoting francophone Louis-Pierre Cécile into cabinet as a minister without portfolio. With this new addition, the size of cabinet expanded seventeen, a new record for Ontario up to this point.

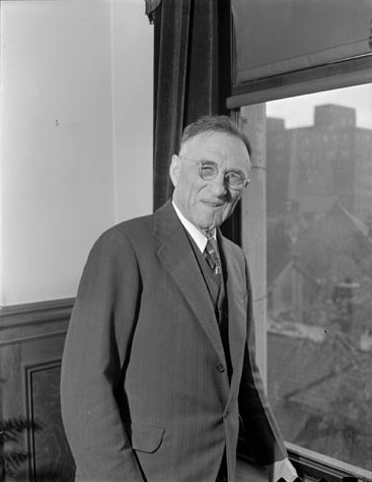
Premier Thomas Laird Kennedy

Two weeks following his convention victory, Drew's long time defacto deputy Thomas Laird Kennedy succeeded Drew as Premier in the interim until the Progressive Party select its next leader. Dana Porter assumed the education portfolio of the departing Drew, and the Provincial Secretary portfolio from Michener. Porter's planning portfolio was transferred to George Welsh, and Welsh's travel and publicity portfolio was given to Cécile. Kennedy kept the rest of the ministers in their portfolios, including Attorney General Leslie Blackwell, who had in July tendered his resignation to Drew but decided to stay and contest the provincial leadership after Drew won the national party leadership.

== Beginning of Progressive Conservative ascendancy ==
In giving up the provincial premiership and moving to the national political arena, Drew followed the footstep of Liberal Premier Edward Blake, who headed a Liberal ministry for ten months from 1871 to 1872. The premiership of Canada eluded both Blake and Drew, just like it had eluded every other provincial premiers that succumbed to its temptation. Just like Blake, however, the legacy of Drew was manifested in the Progressive Conservative Party's decades of dominance. While Blake's brief premiership ushered in thirty-four years of continual Liberal rule, Drew set his party on a course of ascendancy that lasted forty-two years, respectively the longest continual period in power for the two parties. The Drew ministry was followed by three successful Progressive Conservative ministries—the Frost, Robarts, and Davis ministries—each governed Ontario for a decade.

== List of ministers ==
=== List of ministers ordered by precedence ===
Minister	Entered ministry	Exited ministry	Electoral district	(Note: Indicate that year's Ontario general election unless otherwise noted)First elected	Note
George Drew	17/08/1943	19/10/1948	High Park	1943	Defeated (1948 election)
Thomas Laird Kennedy	(16/09/1930); 17/08/1943	04/05/1949	Peel	1919	Served in Ferguson and Henry ministries
George Holmes Challies	(31/07/1931); 17/08/1943	04/05/1949	Grenville-Dundas	1929	Served in Henry ministries
George Doucett	17/08/1943	04/05/1949	Lanark	1937	
George Harrison Dunbar	17/08/1943	04/05/1949	Ottawa South	1937	
Leslie Frost	17/08/1943	04/05/1949	Victoria	1937	
Leslie Blackwell	17/08/1943	04/05/1949	Eglinton	1943	
Charles Daley	17/08/1943	04/05/1949	Lincoln	1943	
Wesley Gardiner Thompson	17/08/1943	28/11/1946	Kent East	1943	Resigned to devote time to private business
Percy Vivian	17/08/1943	07/01/1946	Durham	1943	Resigned to devote time to work as chair of health and social medicine, McGill University
Dana Porter	08/05/1944	04/05/1949	St George	1943	
William Gourlay Webster	13/12/1944	19/10/1948	London	1943	Defeated (1948 election)
Bill Goodfellow	07/01/1946	04/05/1949	Northumberland	1943	
Russell Temple Kelley	07/01/1946	04/05/1949	Hamilton—Wentworth	1945	
George Arthur Welsh	25/03/1946	04/05/1949	Muskoka–Ontario	1945	
Roland Michener	15/04/1946	19/10/1948	St. David	1945	Defeated (1948 election)
William Griesinger	15/04/1946	04/05/1949	Windsor-Sandwich	1945	
Harold Robinson Scott	28/11/1946	04/05/1949	Peterborough	1943	
Louis-Pierre Cécile	17/09/1948	04/05/1949	Prescott	1948	

=== List of minister by portfolio ===
Portfolio	Minister	Tenure	
Portfolio	Minister	Start	End
Prime Minister of Ontario; President of the Council	George A. Drew	August 17, 1943	October 19, 1948
Prime Minister of Ontario; President of the Council	Thomas Laird Kennedy	October 19, 1948	May 4, 1949
Attorney General	Leslie Blackwell	August 17, 1943	May 4, 1949
Provincial Secretary & Registrar	George Dunbar	August 17, 1943	April 15, 1946
Provincial Secretary & Registrar	Roland Michener	April 15, 1946	October 19, 1948
Provincial Secretary & Registrar	Dana Porter	October 19, 1948	May 4, 1949
Treasurer	Leslie Frost	August 17, 1943	May 4, 1949
Minister of Agriculture	Thomas Laird Kennedy	August 17, 1943	May 4, 1949
Minister of Education	George A. Drew	August 17, 1943	October 19, 1948
Minister of Education	Dana Porter	October 19, 1948	May 4, 1949
Minister of Health	Percy Vivian	August 17, 1943	January 7, 1946
Minister of Health	Russell Temple Kelley	January 7, 1946	May 4, 1949
Ministry of Highways	George Doucett	August 17, 1943	May 4, 1949
Minister of Public Works	George Doucett	August 17, 1943	May 4, 1949
Minister of Labour	Charles Daley	August 17, 1943	May 4, 1949
Minister of Lands and Forests	Wesley Thompson	August 17, 1943	November 28, 1946
Minister of Lands and Forests	Harold Robinson Scott	November 28, 1946	May 4, 1949
Minister of Mines	Leslie Frost	August 17, 1943	May 4, 1949
Minister of Municipal Affairs	George Dunbar	August 17, 1943	May 4, 1949
Minister of Planning and Development	Dana Porter	May 8, 1944	October 19, 1948
Minister of Planning and Development	George Arthur Welsh	October 19, 1948	May 4, 1949
Minister of Public Welfare	Percy Vivian	August 17, 1943	January 7, 1946
Minister of Public Welfare	Bill Goodfellow	January 7, 1946	May 4, 1949
Minister of Reform Institutions	George Harrison Dunbar	April 15, 1946	May 4, 1949
Minister of Travel and Publicity	George Arthur Welsh	March 25, 1946	October 19, 1948
Minister of Travel and Publicity	Louis-Pierre Cécile	October 19, 1948	May 4, 1949
Ministers without portfolios	George Holmes Challies	August 17, 1943	May 4, 1949
Ministers without portfolios	Louis-Pierre Cécile	September 17,1948	October 19, 1948
Ministers without portfolios (with specific assignment to the Liquor Control Board)	William Gourlay Webster	December 13, 1944	October 19, 1948
Ministers without portfolios (with specific assignment to the Liquor Control Board)	William Griesinger	April 15, 1946	May 4, 1949

=== Composition timeline ===
	1943	1944	1945	1946	1947	1948	1949
Prime Minister	George Drew						T.L. Kennedy
Attorney General	Leslie Blackwell						
Treasurer	Leslie Frost						
Travel and Publicity	(branch in Treasury)				George Welsh		L-P Cécile
Provincial Secretary	George Dunbar				Roland Michener		Dana Porter
Reform Institutions	(branch in Provincial Secretariet)				George Dunbar		
Municipal Affairs	George Dunbar						
Lands and Forests	Wesley Thompson				Harold Scott		
Mines	Leslie Frost						
Agriculture	Thomas Kennedy						
Public Works	George Doucett						
Highways	George Doucett						
Health	Percy Vivian			Russell Kelley			
Public Welfare	Percy Vivian			Bill Goodfellow			
Labour	Charles Daley						
Education	George Drew						Dana Porter
Planning & Development			Dana Porter				George Welsh
