= Ministry of Natural Resources (Ontario) =

Ontario provincial government department

- Ministère des Richesses naturelles (French)
- Government of Ontario wordmark

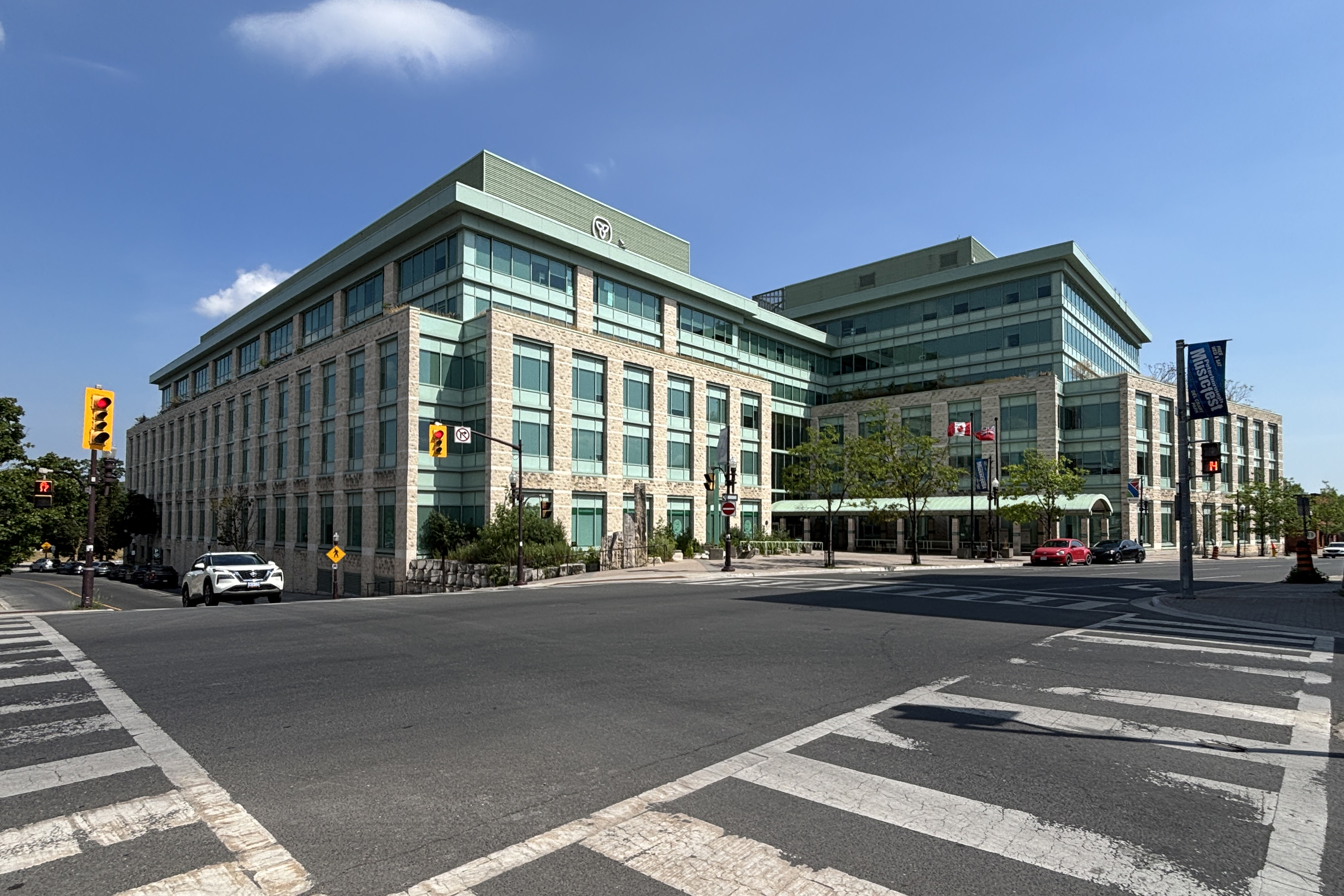
- The ministry's headquarters at Robinson Place in Peterborough

Ministry overview
- Formed: 1972
- Jurisdiction: Government of Ontario
- Headquarters: Peterborough, Ontario
- Ministers responsible: Graydon Smith, Minister of Natural Resources; Greg Rickford, Minister of Northern Development; George Pirie, Minister of Mines; Kevin Holland, Associate Minister of Forestry and Forest Products; Stephen Crawford, Associate Minister of Mines
- Website: www.ontario.ca/page/ministry-natural-resources

The Ministry of Natural Resources is a government ministry of the Canadian province of Ontario that is responsible for Ontario's provincial parks, forests, fisheries, wildlife, mineral aggregates and the Crown lands and waters that make up 87 per cent of the province. Its offices are divided into Northwestern, Northeastern and Southern Ontario regions with the main headquarters in Peterborough, Ontario. The current minister is Graydon Smith.

Founded in its modern form in 1972, it has been associated with many other related ministries over the years, including recently the Ministry of Energy, the Ministry of Northern Development, the Ministry of Mines (Ontario), and the Ministry of Indigenous Affairs. Often these portfolios will be consolidated into one or two ministries, or they will remain separate portfolios but assigned to the same cabinet minister. While there has never been an independent Ministry of Forests, forestry is an area of responsibility that is often in the mix.

In 2021, the Ministry of Natural Resources and Forestry merged with the Ministry of Energy, Northern Development and Mines to form the Ministry of Northern Development, Mines, Natural Resources and Forestry, while the Ministry of Energy became a separate ministry. Following the 2022 Ontario general election, the Ministry of Northern Development, Mines, Natural Resources and Forestry was split up into three separate ministries. In June, 2024, the Minister of Natural Resources no longer had responsibility for forestry, which was now the responsibility of an Associate Minister of Forestry under the Minister of Natural Resources. The Minister of Mines and Minister of Northern Development remained separate ministries.

The Minister of Natural Resources and Forestry was Graydon Smith from the 2022 election until June 2024, when he was appointed the Minister of Natural Resources In August, 2024 Kevin Holland became the Associate Minister of Forestry and Forest Products under the Ministry of Natural Resources. Since the 2022 election, the Minister of Mines is George Pirie, and the Minister of Northern Development is Greg Rickford.

== History ==
The first government office charge with responsibility of crown land management in modern-day Ontario was the Office of the Surveyor-General of the Northern District of North America, created in 1763 and initially headed by Samuel Holland. Holland was initially appointed Surveyor General of Quebec, but offered to assume the larger responsibility at no increase in salary. In 1791, Upper and Lower Canada were created via the Constitutional Act 1791. Holland continued to serve as Surveyor General for both, but openly advocated that they should be separate posts.

In 1792, David William Smith was named by Lieutenant Governor John Graves Simcoe to be acting Surveyor General of Upper Canada (against Holland's advice to appoint William Chewett as his replacement). Smith was subsequently officially appointed to the position in 1798 and held the office until his resignation in 1804. The previously overlooked Chewett and Thomas Ridout were appointed to the position jointly in the interim. In 1805, Charles Burton Wyatt was appointed (along with Joseph Bouchette) but was suspended in 1807. Ridout was named to the office in 1807 and held the position until 1829.

The Office of the Commissioner of Crown Lands for Upper Canada was established in 1827. By the 1840s, however, the crown lands department had been established over which the Commissioner presided, and by 1860, this was renamed the Department of Crown Lands. The primary responsibility of the department was the sale and management of public lands and the granting of land to settlers. Between 1827 and 1867, the responsibilities of the department expanded to include the duties of the Surveyor General (in 1845), as well as those of the Surveyor General of Woods and Forests (in 1852). By 1867, the department had responsibility over mines, fisheries, ordnance lands, colonization roads, and Indian affairs, as well.

In 1867, the Department of Crown Lands for the Province of Canada was replaced with the Department of Crown Lands for Ontario. Ordnance lands, Indian affairs and fisheries were, however, transferred to the federal government in 1867. In 1900, the department also acquired responsibility over immigration and colonization.

In 1905, legislation was passed which renamed the Commissioner of Crown Lands to the Minister of Lands and Mines. With this change, the department was renamed the Department of Lands and Mines. At this time, responsibilities for forestry were transferred to the Department of Agriculture. In 1906, the department was renamed the Department of Lands, Forests and Mines, resuming responsibilities for forestry. It also resumed responsibilities for immigration and colonization between 1916 and 1920.

In 1920, the department was renamed Department of Lands and Forests when a separate Department of Mines was established. Responsibilities for immigration and colonization were also transferred back to the Department of Agriculture.

The department existed until 1972, when it amalgamated with the Department of Mines and Northern Affairs to form the Ministry of Natural Resources. The ministry was responsible for northern affairs until 1977, and for mines until 1985. It was again merged briefly between 1995 and 1997 with Northern Development and Mines to form a single Ministry of Natural Resources, Northern Development and Mines.

In 2014 the ministry was renamed the Ministry of Natural Resources and Forestry, but responsibilities did not change.

In June 2021, the Ministry of Natural Resources and Forestry once again merged with the Ministry of Northern Development and Mines to form the Ministry of Northern Development, Mines, Natural Resources and Forestry.

After the 2022 Ontario General Election in which the incumbent Progressive Conservatives were re-elected, the Ministry was once again separated, this time into 3 independent ministries; the Ministry of Natural Resources and Forestry, the Ministry of Northern Development and the Ministry of Mines.

On 6 June 2024, it was announced that the Minister of Natural Resources longer had responsibility for forestry. Nolan Quinn became the Associate Minister of Forestry under the Ministry of Natural Resources. On August 16, Kevin Holland became the Associate Minister of Forestry and Forest Products .

=== List of ministers (and "commissioners", before 1905) ===
Name	Term of office		Name	Term of office		Political party (Ministry)	Note
Commissioner of Crown Lands							
Stephen Richards				16 July 1867	25 July 1871	Liberal Conservative (MacDonald)	
Matthew Crooks Cameron				25 July 1871	21 December 1871	Liberal Conservative (MacDonald)	
Richard William Scott				21 December 1871	25 October 1872	Liberal (Blake)	
Richard William Scott				25 October 1872	4 December 1873	Liberal (Mowat)	
Timothy Blair Pardee				4 December 1873	18 January 1889	Liberal (Mowat)	Resigned due to poor health, subsequently died on 21 July 1889.
Arthur Sturgis Hardy				18 January 1889	21 July 1896	Liberal (Mowat)	
John Morison Gibson				21 July 1896	21 October 1899	Liberal (Hardy)	
Elihu Davis				21 October 1899	22 November 1904	Liberal (Ross)	
Alexander Grant MacKay				22 November 1904	8 February 1905	Liberal (Ross)	
James Joseph Foy				8 February 1905	30 May 1905	Conservative (Whitney)	
Minister of Lands and Mines						Conservative (Whitney)	
Francis Cochrane				30 May 1905	27 April 1906	Conservative (Whitney)	
Minister of Lands, Forests and Mines						Conservative (Whitney)	
Francis Cochrane				27 April 1906	12 October 1911	Conservative (Whitney)	
William Howard Hearst				12 October 1911	2 October 1914	Conservative (Whitney)	
William Howard Hearst				2 October 1914	22 December 1914	Conservative (Hearst)	While Premier
Howard Ferguson				22 December 1914	14 November 1919	Conservative (Hearst)	
Beniah Bowman				14 November 1919	26 June 1920	United Farmers (Drury)	
Minister of Lands and Forests			Minister of Mines			United Farmers (Drury)	
Beniah Bowman	26 June 1920	16 July 1923	Harry Mills	26 June 1920	16 July 1923	United Farmers (Drury)	
James W. Lyons	16 July 1923	1 March 1926	Charles McCrea	16 July 1923	15 December 1930	Conservative (Ferguson)	
Howard Ferguson	2 March 1926	18 October 1926	Charles McCrea	16 July 1923	15 December 1930	Conservative (Ferguson)	While Premier
William Finlayson	18 October 1926	15 December 1930	Charles McCrea	16 July 1923	15 December 1930	Conservative (Ferguson)	
William Finlayson	15 December 1930	10 July 1934	Charles McCrea	15 December 1930	10 July 1934	Conservative (Henry)	
Peter Heenan	10 July 1934	27 May 1941	Paul Leduc	10 July 1934	30 September 1940	Liberal (Hepburn)	
Peter Heenan	10 July 1934	27 May 1941	Robert Laurier	7 October 1940	21 October 1942	Liberal (Hepburn)	
Norman Otto Hipel	27 May 1941	21 October 1942	Robert Laurier	7 October 1940	21 October 1942	Liberal (Hepburn)	Hipel was concurrently Provincial Secretary and Registrar (27 October 1942 – 18 May 1943)
Norman Otto Hipel	21 October 1942	18 May 1943	Robert Laurier	21 October 1942	18 May 1943	Liberal (Conant)	Hipel was concurrently Provincial Secretary and Registrar (27 October 1942 – 18 May 1943)
Norman Otto Hipel	18 May 1943	17 August 1943	Robert Laurier	18 May 1943	17 August 1943	Liberal (Nixon)	Hipel was concurrently Provincial Secretary and Registrar (27 October 1942 – 18 May 1943)
Wesley Gardiner Thompson	17 August 1943	28 November 1946	Leslie Frost	17 August 1943	19 October 1948	PC (Drew)	
Harold Robinson Scott	28 November 1946	19 October 1948	Leslie Frost	17 August 1943	19 October 1948	PC (Drew)	
Harold Robinson Scott	19 October 1948	4 May 1949	Leslie Frost	19 October 1948	4 May 1949	PC (Kennedy)	
Harold Robinson Scott	4 May 1949	3 June 1952	Welland Gemmell	4 May 1949	3 June 1952	PC (Frost)	
Welland Gemmell	3 June 1952	18 June 1954	Philip Kelly	3 June 1952	18 July 1957	PC (Frost)	Gemmell died in office
Clare Mapledoram	7 July 1954	4 July 1958	Philip Kelly	3 June 1952	18 July 1957	PC (Frost)	
Clare Mapledoram	7 July 1954	4 July 1958	Wilf Spooner	18 July 1957	22 December 1958	PC (Frost)	
Wilf Spooner	23 July 1958	8 November 1961	James Anthony Maloney	22 December 1958	1 October 1961	PC (Frost)	Maloney died in office
Wilf Spooner	8 November 1961	25 October 1962	George Wardrope	8 November 1961	23 November 1967	PC (Robarts)	
Kelso Roberts	25 October 1962	24 November 1966	George Wardrope	8 November 1961	23 November 1967	PC (Robarts)	
René Brunelle	24 November 1966	1 March 1971	George Wardrope	8 November 1961	23 November 1967	PC (Robarts)	
René Brunelle	24 November 1966	1 March 1971	René Brunelle	23 November 1967	13 February 1968	PC (Robarts)	
René Brunelle	24 November 1966	1 March 1971	Allan Lawrence	13 February 1968	26 June 1970	PC (Robarts)	
René Brunelle	24 November 1966	1 March 1971	Minister of Mines and Northern Affairs			PC (Robarts)	
René Brunelle	24 November 1966	1 March 1971	Allan Lawrence	26 June 1970	1 March 1971	PC (Robarts)	
René Brunelle	1 March 1971	2 February 1972	Leo Bernier	1 March 1971	2 April 1972	PC (Davis)	
Leo Bernier	2 February 1972	7 April 1972	Leo Bernier	1 March 1971	2 April 1972	PC (Davis)	
Minister of Natural Resources						PC (Davis)	
Leo Bernier				7 April 1972	3 February 1977	PC (Davis)	
Minister of Natural Resources			Minister of Northern Affairs			PC (Davis)	
Frank Miller	3 February 1977	18 August 1978	Leo Bernier	3 February 1977	26 June 1985	PC (Davis)	
James Auld	18 August 1978	10 April 1981	Leo Bernier	3 February 1977	26 June 1985	PC (Davis)	Auld was concurrently Minister of Energy
Alan Pope	10 April 1981	8 February 1985	Leo Bernier	3 February 1977	26 June 1985	PC (Davis)	
Mike Harris	8 February 1985	26 June 1985	Leo Bernier	3 February 1977	26 June 1985	PC (Miller)	Harris was concurrently Minister of Energy from 17 May 1985, onward
Vince Kerrio	26 June 1985	2 August 1989	Minister of Northern Development and Mines (Note: briefly named "Minister of Mines and Northern Affairs" from June 26, 1985 to November 27, 1985.)			Liberal (Peterson)	
Vince Kerrio	26 June 1985	2 August 1989	René Fontaine	26 June 1985	26 June 1986	Liberal (Peterson)	Kerrio was concurrently Minister of Energy until 29 September 1987
Vince Kerrio	26 June 1985	2 August 1989	David Peterson	26 June 1986	29 September 1987	Liberal (Peterson)	Peterson was concurrently Premier
Vince Kerrio	26 June 1985	2 August 1989	Minister of Mines			Liberal (Peterson)	
Vince Kerrio	26 June 1985	2 August 1989	Sean Conway	29 September 1987	2 August 1989	Liberal (Peterson)	René Fontaine was Minister of Northern Development from 29 September 1987 to October 1, 1990
Lyn McLeod	2 August 1989	1 October 1990	Hugh O'Neil	2 August 1989	1 October 1990	Liberal (Peterson)	McLeod was concurrently Minister of Energy
Bud Wildman	1 October 1990	3 February 1993	Gilles Pouliot	1 October 1990	31 July 1991	NDP (Rae)	Shelley Martel was Minister of Northern Development from 1 October 1990, to 31 July 1991
Bud Wildman	1 October 1990	3 February 1993	Minister of Northern Development and Mines			NDP (Rae)	Wildman was concurrently Minister Responsible for Native Affairs
Bud Wildman	1 October 1990	3 February 1993	Shelley Martel	31 July 1991	7 October 1994	NDP (Rae)	Wildman was concurrently Minister Responsible for Native Affairs
Howard Hampton	3 February 1993	26 June 1995	Shelley Martel	31 July 1991	7 October 1994	NDP (Rae)	Hampton was concurrently Minister Responsible for Native Affairs
Howard Hampton	3 February 1993	26 June 1995	Gilles Pouliot	7 October 1994	26 June 1995	NDP (Rae)	Hampton was concurrently Minister Responsible for Native Affairs
Minister of Natural Resources, Northern Development and Mines						PC (Harris)	
Chris Hodgson				26 June 1995	10 October 1997	PC (Harris)	
Minister of Natural Resources			Minister of Northern Development and Mines			PC (Harris)	
John Snobelen	10 October 1997	14 April 2002	Chris Hodgson	10 October 1997	17 June 1999	PC (Harris)	Hodgson was concurrently Chair of the Management Board of Cabinet
John Snobelen	10 October 1997	14 April 2002	Tim Hudak	17 June 1999	8 March 2001	PC (Harris)	
John Snobelen	10 October 1997	14 April 2002	Dan Newman	8 February 2001	14 April 2002	PC (Harris)	
Jerry Ouellette	15 April 2002	22 October 2003	Jim Wilson	15 April 2002	22 October 2003	PC (Eves)	
David Ramsay	23 October 2003	30 October 2007	Rick Bartolucci	23 October 2003	30 October 2007	Liberal (McGuinty)	Concurrently Minister Responsible for Aboriginal Affairs (29 June 2005 – 21 June 2007), Minister of Aboriginal Affairs (21 June 2007 – 30 October 2007)
Donna Cansfield	30 October 2007	18 January 2010	Michael Gravelle (Note: briefly named "Ministry of Northern Development, Mines and Forestry" between 24 June 2009, and 20 October 2011.)	30 October 2007	20 October 2011	Liberal (McGuinty)	
Linda Jeffrey	18 January 2010	20 October 2011	Michael Gravelle	30 October 2007	20 October 2011	Liberal (McGuinty)	
Michael Gravelle	20 October 2011	11 February 2013	Rick Bartolucci	20 October 2011	11 February 2013	Liberal (McGuinty)	Bartolucci was concurrently Chair of Cabinet
David Orazietti	11 February 2013	24 June 2014	Michael Gravelle	11 February 2013	29 June 2018	Liberal (Wynne)	
Minister of Natural Resources and Forestry			Michael Gravelle	11 February 2013	29 June 2018	Liberal (Wynne)	
Bill Mauro	24 June 2014	13 June 2016	Michael Gravelle	11 February 2013	29 June 2018	Liberal (Wynne)	
Kathryn McGarry	13 June 2016	17 January 2018	Michael Gravelle	11 February 2013	29 June 2018	Liberal (Wynne)	
Nathalie Des Rosiers	17 January 2018	29 June 2018	Michael Gravelle	11 February 2013	29 June 2018	Liberal (Wynne)	
Jeff Yurek	29 June 2018	5 November 2018	Minister of Energy, Northern Development and Mines			PC (Ford)	
John Yakabuski	5 November 2018	18 June 2021	Greg Rickford	29 June 2018	18 June 2021	PC (Ford)	Rickford was concurrently Minister of Indigenous Affairs
Minister of Northern Development, Mines, Natural Resources and Forestry						PC (Ford)	
Greg Rickford				18 June 2021	24 June 2022	PC (Ford)	Concurrently Minister of Indigenous Affairs
Minister of Natural Resources and Forestry			Minister of Mines			PC (Ford)	
Graydon Smith	24 June 2022	6 June 2024	George Pirie (Stephen Crawford serves as additional Associate Minister of Mines after 6 June 2024)	24 June 2022	incumbent	PC (Ford)	Greg Rickford is Minister of Northern Development and Minister of Indigenous Affairs since 24 June 2022
Minister of Natural Resources			George Pirie (Stephen Crawford serves as additional Associate Minister of Mines after 6 June 2024)	24 June 2022	incumbent	PC (Ford)	
Graydon Smith	6 June 2024	incumbent	George Pirie (Stephen Crawford serves as additional Associate Minister of Mines after 6 June 2024)	24 June 2022	incumbent	PC (Ford)	Nolan Quinn was Associate Minister of Forestry and Forest Products from 24 June 2024 to 16 August 2024; Kevin Holland is Associate Minister of Forestry and Forest Products since 16 August 2024

== Organization ==
MNRF is organized into divisions; within each division are branches/regions, sections, and units.

Divisions

- Regional Operations Division
- Provincial Services Division
- Policy Division
- Corporate Management and Information Division

== Responsibilities ==
The Ministry is responsible for:

- Fish & Wildlife Management – sustainably managing Ontario's fish and wildlife resources.
- Land & Waters Management – leading the management of Ontario's Crown lands, water, oil, gas, salt and aggregates resources, including making Crown land available for renewable energy projects.
- Forest Management – ensuring the sustainable management of Ontario's Crown forests.
- Forest Fire, Flood and Drought Protection - protecting people, property and communities from related emergencies.
- Geographic Information – developing and applying geographic information to help manage the province's natural resources.

The ministry also has responsibility for the Office of the Mining & Lands Commissioner and the Niagara Escarpment Commission agencies.

=== Regional Operations Division ===
The Regional Operations Division (ROD) is a frontline arm of the Ministry with offices in 35 locations across Ontario. It plays a key role in issuing authorizations and compliance monitoring to ensure the province's natural resources are managed effectively and sustainably. ROD is accountable for:

- The sustainable management of Ontario's fish and wildlife resources
- The management of Ontario's Crown lands, water, oil, gas, salt and aggregates resources, including making Crown land available for renewable energy projects
- Ensuring the sustainable management of Ontario's Crown forests
- Protecting people, property and communities from forest fires, floods, droughts, and other emergencies
- Developing and applying geographic information to help manage the province's natural resources.

ROD's programs and services contribute directly to:

- provincial revenue (e.g. Crown land rental fees, hydro-electric royalties, etc.)
- understanding and protecting Ontario's ecosystems and natural resources
- supporting the natural resource-based and green energy economy (e.g. fishing, hunting, tourism, forestry, etc.)
- keeping people and property safe from natural hazards (e.g. dam operations, flood forecasting and warning, etc.)

ROD also works jointly with First Nations on community-based land use planning in the far north. The parties make consensus-based recommendations on which Crown lands will be dedicated to protection and which will be open for potential economic development (e.g. tourism, forestry, mining, renewable energy).

=== Ontario Forest Research Institute ===
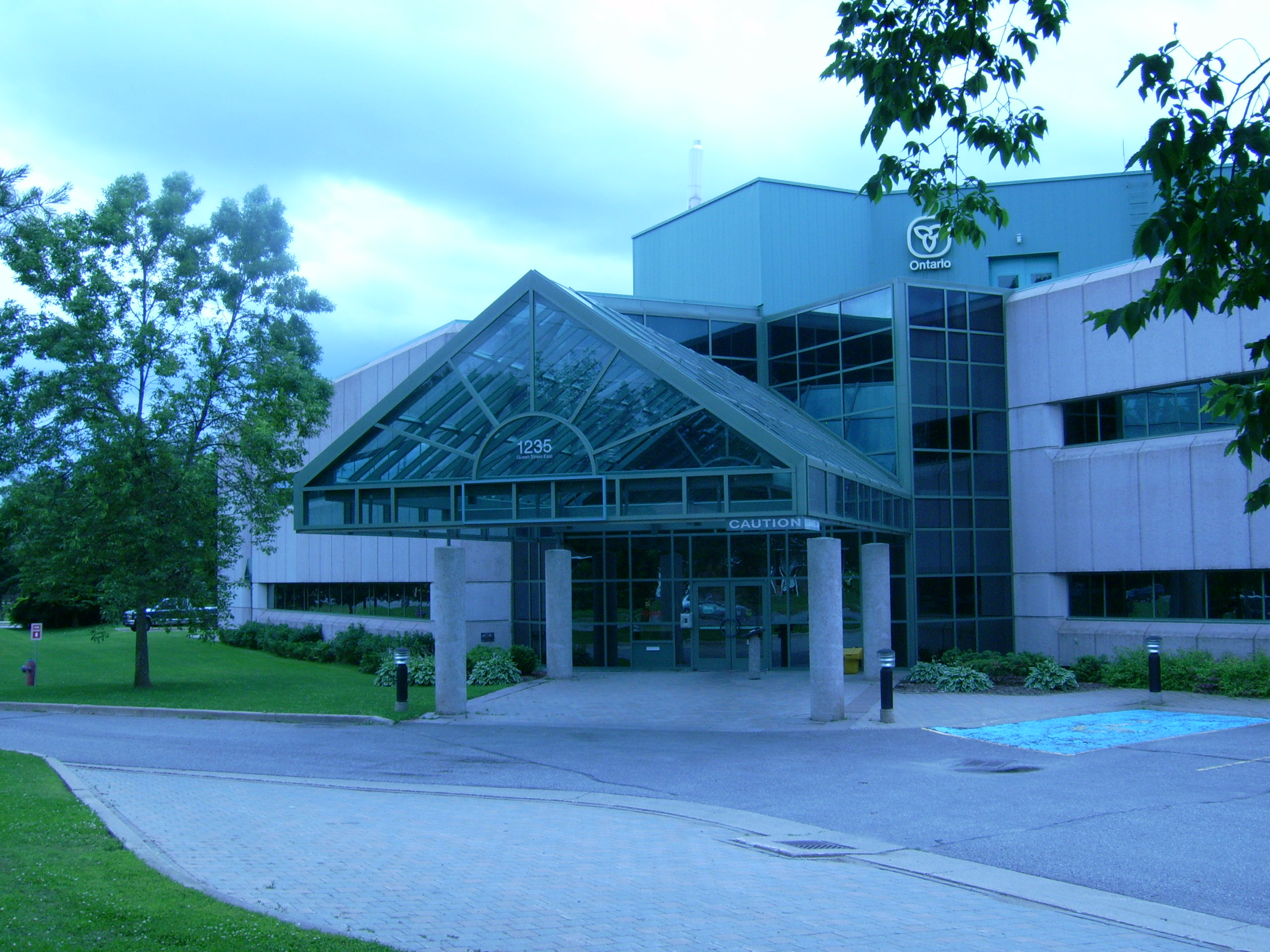
OFRI entrance

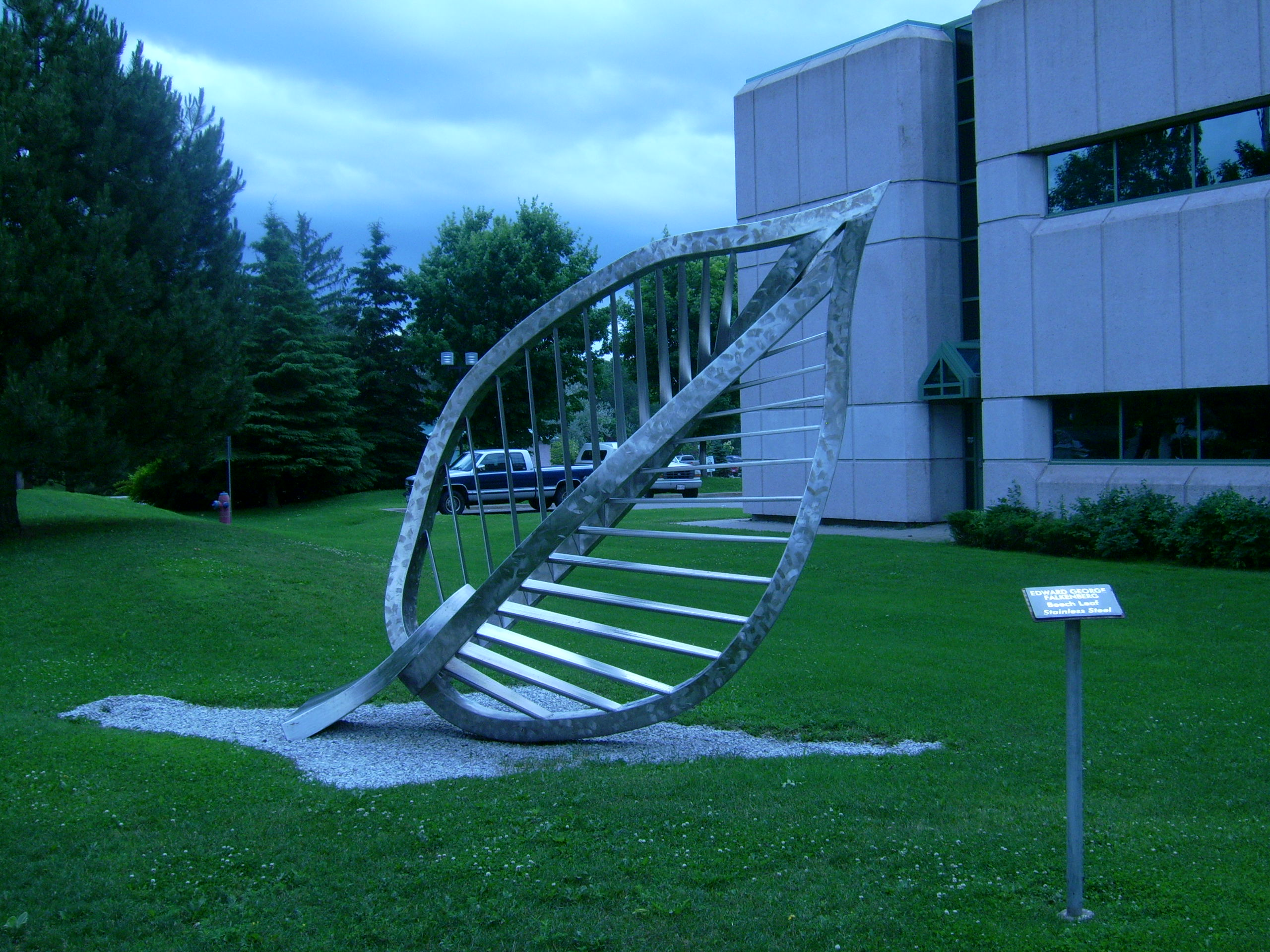
"Beech Leaf" by Edward George Falkenburg

Ontario Forest Research Institute (OFRI) is a division of the ministry located in Sault Ste. Marie, Ontario, Canada. This institute is composed of research scientists, specialists, statisticians, technicians, management, and administrative staff. OFRI research helps provide sustainable management of Ontario Forests and Natural Resources.

=== Aviation, Forest Fire and Emergency Services ===
The Ministry's Aviation, Forest Fire and Emergency Services (AFFES) program coordinates forest fire detection, monitoring, suppression and public information and education services for Ontario. AFFES also provides aviation services for the Ontario government and leads emergency management planning and response for natural hazards such as forest fires, floods, erosion, dam failures, unstable soils and bedrock, droughts and oil and gas emergencies.

The Ministry's entrance into the field of aviation started with hiring Laurentide Air Services to carry out fire patrols however the government soon realized it could save money by carrying out the operations itself and formed the Ontario Provincial Air Service, (O.P.A.S.) in February 1924 with 13 second hand Curtiss HS-2L flying boats that had been originally built for the US Navy. The OPAS was an early pioneer in the use of aircraft for the discovery and extinguishing of forest fires. Initially this involved carrying warnings of fires back to existing fire patrols, to be extinguished by teams that travelled by canoe or overland but soon they began landing firefighters (never more than a few at a time due to the limited carrying capacity of the aircraft available) with a hand-operated water pump near a fire. As a part of this program the OPAS completely rebuilt damaged aircraft before they began building a number of aircraft under license to meet their requirements such as the Buhl Air Sedan, and later provided considerable input on the development of the de Havilland Canada DHC-2 Beaver and de Havilland Canada DHC-3 Otter and finally were central to the invention of the water bomber. The first water bomber was an OPAS DHC Beaver with a tank mounted on the float designed to dump the water out quickly. This had followed unsuccessful experiments with bags of water.

Current AFFES Airfleet

- 9 Bombardier Canadair CL-415 - firefighting
- 3 Bell 206 L-1 Long Ranger II
- 1 Eurocopter 350-B2s
- 2 Beechcraft King Air 300
- 7 Eurocopter EC 130 B4
- 6 de Havilland Canada DHC-6 Twin Otters - firefighting
- 5 de Havilland Canada DHC-2 Mk III Turbo Beavers - firefighting

Retired

- 4 Buhl CA-6 Air Sedans
- 2 Canadian Vickers Vedette Flying Boats
- 14 Curtiss HS-2L Flying Boats
- de Havilland Canada DHC-2 Beaver
- de Havilland Canada DHC-3 Otter
- de Havilland Dove Twin Engine Monoplane
- de Havilland Fox Moth Cabin Biplane
- 2 de Havilland Giant Moth Cabin Biplane
- 17 de Havilland Moth (includes DH.60G Gypsy Moth, DH.60M Moth & DH.60X Moth)
- 4 Fairchild 71 cabin monoplanes
- Fairchild KR-34 (Open cockpit biplane permanently assigned to the Superintendent)
- Grumman CS2F-1 Tracker - firefighting
- 4 Hamilton Metalplane cabin monoplanes
- 1 MBB/Kawasaki BK 117 twin engine helicopter
- 10+ Stinson Reliant Cabin monoplane
- Waco ZQC-6 Cabin Biplane

==== Aircraft on display ====
- Former MNR de Havilland Beaver, C-FOBS, serial number 2, the first production Beaver manufactured by de Havilland Canada, is on display at the Canadian Bushplane Heritage Centre, Sault Ste Marie, Ontario

== See also ==
- Canadian Bushplane Heritage Centre (CBHC)
- Ontario Forest Research Institute (OFRI)
