= René Brunelle =

Canadian politician

Ontario MPP
- In office 1958–1981
- Preceded by: Philip Kelly
- Succeeded by: René Piché
- Constituency: Cochrane North

Personal details
- Born: January 22, 1920 Penetanguishene, Ontario
- Died: April 14, 2010 (aged 90) Magog, Quebec
- Party: Progressive Conservative
- Spouse: Andrée Hebert
- Children: 4
- Occupation: Tourism operator

Military service
- Allegiance: Canadian
- Branch/service: Army
- Years of service: 1942–1945
- Rank: Officer
- Unit: Les Fusiliers de Sherbrooke

René Joseph Napoléon Brunelle (January 22, 1920 – April 14, 2010) was a Canadian politician, who represented Cochrane North in the Legislative Assembly of Ontario from 1958 to 1981 as a Progressive Conservative member.

== Background ==
Brunelle was born in Penetanguishene, Ontario and educated in Timmins, Ottawa, at Khaki University and the University of Toronto. He was a director for the Northern Telephone Company and Spruce Falls Pulp and Paper Company (Kimberly Clark), and joined the Canadian Army in 1943 during World War II, serving with Les Fusiliers de Sherbrooke. Brunelle subsequently worked as a tourism operator at Remi Lake, near Moonbeam.

== Politics ==
He first tried his hand at Federal politics by running in the Canadian election of 1949. He lost to J.A. Bradette in the riding of Cochrane by 2,467 votes. He ran again in 1953 and 1958 losing both times. Shortly after losing the Federal election he entered a provincial by-election in the riding of Cochrane North. This time he won the election.

He served as a backbench supporter for eight years before he was appointed to cabinet as Minister of Lands and Forests on November 24, 1966. In 1972, he was appointed as Minister of Social and Family Services. In 1975 he was shuffled to a Minister without portfolio role. Two years later he was promoted to Provincial Secretary for Resources Development. In 1981 he announced that he was retiring from politics and would not contest the 1981 election.

=== Cabinet positions ===
Davis ministry, Province of Ontario (1971–1985)
Cabinet posts (3)
| Predecessor | Office | Successor |
|---|---|---|
| Donald Irvine | Provincial Secretary for Resource Development; 1977–1981 | Russ Ramsay |
| Thomas Wells | Minister of Community and Social Services (Note: Was styled as Minister of Social and Family Services from February to April, 1972.); 1972–1975 | James Taylor |
Sub-Cabinet Post
| Predecessor | Title | Successor |
| | Minister without portfolio (1975–1977) | |
Robarts ministry, Province of Ontario (1961–1971)
Cabinet posts (2)
| Predecessor | Office | Successor |
| George Wardrope | Minister of Mines; 1967–1968 | Allan Lawrence |
| Kelso Roberts | Minister of Lands and Forests; 1966–1972 | Leo Bernier |

== Later life ==
After leaving politics he was hired by Spruce Falls Power and Paper Co. Ltd. as a consultant. He died in Magog, Quebec at the age of 90. After his retirement from politics, the René Brunelle Provincial Park near Kapuskasing, Ontario was named in his honour.
