= Russell Temple Kelley =

Canadian politician

Russell Kelly

Ontario MPP
- In office 1945–1951
- Preceded by: Frederick Wilson Warren
- Succeeded by: Ray Connell
- Constituency: Hamilton—Wentworth

Personal details
- Born: September 10, 1877 Huron County, Ontario
- Died: February 20, 1952 (aged 75) Hamilton, Ontario
- Party: Liberal
- Spouse: Grace Gillespie Powis (m. 1910)
- Occupation: Businessman
- Cabinet: Minister without portfolio (1950–1951)

Russell Temple Kelley (September 10, 1877 – February 20, 1952) was an Ontario insurance broker and political figure. He represented Hamilton—Wentworth in the Legislative Assembly of Ontario as a Progressive Conservative member from 1945 to 1951.

== Background ==
He was born in Huron County, Ontario in 1877, the son of James Kelley. In 1910, he married Grace Gillespie Powis.

== Politics ==
Kelley served as Minister of Health in the provincial cabinet from 1946 to 1950; he was also Minister Without Portfolio from 1950 to 1951. He served as president of the local Chamber of Commerce and was director of the local YMCA. He died at his home in Hamilton in 1952. He had been in declining health ever since suffering a stroke during a sitting of the legislature in his final term.

=== Cabinet positions ===
Frost ministry, Province of Ontario (1949–1961)
Kennedy ministry, Province of Ontario (1948–1949)
Drew ministry, Province of Ontario (1943–1948)
Cabinet post (1)
Predecessor	Office	Successor
Percy Vivian	Minister of Health; 1946-1950	Mac Phillips
