= William Ernest Hamilton =

Canadian politician

Ontario MPP
- In office 1945–1955
- Preceded by: Leslie Hancock
- Succeeded by: Harry Worton
- Constituency: Wellington South

Personal details
- Born: March 15, 1902 Guelph, Ontario
- Died: June 8, 1985 (aged 83) Guelph, Ontario
- Party: Progressive Conservative
- Spouse: Jean Irene Clark (m. 1928)
- Occupation: Businessman
- Portfolio: Minister without portfolio, 1950-1955

William Ernest Hamilton (March 15, 1902 – June 8, 1985) was a politician in Ontario, Canada. He was a Progressive Conservative member of the Legislative Assembly of Ontario from 1945 to 1955 who represented the Guelph area riding of Wellington South. He was a cabinet minister in the government of Leslie Frost.

== Background ==
He was born in Guelph, Ontario and studied at Guelph Collegiate Vocational Institute and the Ontario Agricultural College. Hamilton began work at a bank and then worked as a salesman at a soap company before taking over the operation of his father's Sun Life Insurance agency. He married Jean Irene Clark in 1928. He served as president of the local YMCA from 1929 to 1930. Hamilton also served as president of the Guelph Board of Trade. He was a member of the board of directors for the Homewood Sanitarium and served as its president. He died at his home in Guelph in 1985.

== Politics ==
Hamilton ran in the 1945 provincial election as the PC candidate in the riding of Wellington South. He defeated Liberal candidate Arthur Badley by 1,598 votes. He was re-elected in 1948 and 1951. In 1955 he was defeated by Liberal candidate Harry Worton.

In 1949 he was appointed to cabinet as Minister of Reform Institutions. In 1950 he was demoted to Minister without Portfolio which he held until his retirement in 1955. He was vice-chairman of the Hydro-Electric Power Commission of Ontario (later Ontario Hydro).

From 1961 to 1962 he served as mayor of Guelph.

=== Cabinet positions ===
Frost ministry, Province of Ontario (1949–1961)
Cabinet post (1)
Predecessor	Office	Successor
George Dunbar	Minister of Reform Institutions; 1949-1950	John Foote
