= George Arthur Welsh =

Canadian politician

Ontario MPP
- In office 1945–1951
- Preceded by: James Francis Kelly
- Succeeded by: Robert Boyer (Note: Riding renamed to Muskoka.)
- Constituency: Muskoka–Ontario

Personal details
- Born: 28 July 1896 Sunderland, Ontario
- Died: 16 February 1965 (aged 68) Hastings, Barbados
- Party: Progressive Conservative
- Occupation: Farmer

Military service
- Allegiance: Canadian
- Branch/service: Royal Flying Corps; Canadian Army
- Years of service: 1917–1918; 1939–1943
- Rank: Commander
- Battles/wars: Operation Husky (1943)
- Awards: Belgian Croix de guerre, DSO

George Arthur Welsh DSO & Bar (28 July 1896 – 16 February 1965) was a Canadian flying ace, farmer and political figure. He represented Muskoka—Ontario in the Legislative Assembly of Ontario as a Progressive Conservative member from 1945 to 1955.

He was born in Sunderland, Ontario, the son of Art Welsh, and was educated there, in Lindsay and at the University of Toronto where he qualified as a Physical Education teacher. In 1917, he enlisted with the Royal Flying Corps and served in northeast France during World War I. He received the Belgian Croix de guerre and was credited with five "victories". On his return, he served as village postmaster and took over ownership of the family farm and mill.

At the beginning of World War II, Welsh reenlisted in the Canadian Army and was put in charge of an anti-tank battery. His unit took part in the Allied invasion of Sicily in July 1943. Welsh was awarded the Distinguished Service Order twice. He was wounded in September 1943 and returned to Canada to serve as commander of the training wing at Camp Shilo. Welsh served in the provincial cabinet as Minister of Travel and Publicity from 1946 to 1948 and Provincial Secretary and Registrar from 1949 to 1955. After retiring from politics, Welsh served as sheriff for Ontario County.

He died of a heart attack in Hastings, Barbados.

Frost ministry, Province of Ontario (1949–1961)
Cabinet post (1)
Predecessor	Office	Successor
Dana Porter	Provincial Secretary and Registrar; 1949–1955	Bill Nickle
Kennedy ministry, Province of Ontario (1948–1949)
Cabinet post (1)
Predecessor	Office	Successor
Dana Porter	Minister of Planning and Development; 1948–1949	William Griesinger
Drew ministry, Province of Ontario (1943–1948)
Cabinet post (1)
Predecessor	Office	Successor
New position	Minister of Travel and Publicity; 1946–1948	Louis-Pierre Cécile
