= Northern Ontario Natural Gas =

Northern Ontario Natural Gas was a natural gas company in Canada in the 1950s and 1960s, which was involved in a stock trading scandal that implicated Supreme Court of Ontario judge Leo Landreville, three Central Ontario mayors, and three members of Premier Leslie Frost's cabinet.

Through a series of reorganizations the company was eventually amalgamated into Union Gas and then Enbridge.

== TransCanada pipeline and scandal ==
Headed by Ralph K. Farris and Gordon Kelly McLean, the company sought the contract for the Northern Ontario leg of the TransCanada pipeline, and tried to secure franchise supply contracts to the region's major cities. In particular, winning a contract to supply Inco's operations in Sudbury was considered a crucial component of the company's business strategy, as Inco was at the time the world's largest consumer of natural gas.

The company offered Landreville, then Sudbury's mayor, an option on 10,000 shares of company stock at $2.50 a share before the city approved NONG's franchise contract. After the deal was approved and NONG's stock rose to $13, Farris purchased 10,000 shares at the $2.50 price, sold 2,500 shares at the new price to reimburse the company, and gave the remaining 7,500 shares to Landreville at no cost to him. Landreville later sold the stock for $117,000 in profit.

The scandal was pursued in the Legislative Assembly of Ontario by Cooperative Commonwealth Federation leader Donald C. MacDonald, leading to the resignations of Philip Kelly, William Griesinger and Clare Mapledoram from Frost's cabinet after their own involvement in the scandal was also revealed.

Although Landreville was acquitted on charges of influence peddling resulting from his involvement in the scandal, he was subsequently induced to resign from the Supreme Court of Ontario bench on the grounds that his conduct had fallen beneath the standards of probity expected of a judge.
