= Philip Kelly (Canadian politician) =

Canadian politician

Ontario MPP
- In office 1951–1958
- Preceded by: Marcel Léger
- Succeeded by: René Brunelle
- Constituency: Cochrane North

Personal details
- Born: August 29, 1901 Baysville, Ontario
- Died: July 24, 1985 (aged 83) North Bay, Ontario
- Party: Progressive Conservative
- Other political affiliations: Social Credit Party of Ontario (1962)
- Spouse: Ethel
- Children: 4
- Occupation: Accountant

Philip Timothy Kelly (August 29, 1901 – July 24, 1985) was a politician in Ontario, Canada. He was a Progressive Conservative member of the Legislative Assembly of Ontario from 1951 to 1958 who represented the northern Ontario riding of Cochrane North. Kelly was a cabinet minister in the government of Leslie Frost until he was implicated in the Northern Ontario Natural Gas and was forced to resign from cabinet.

== Background ==
Kelly was born in Baysville in Northern Ontario, the son of Timothy Kelly and Mary Tooke. He went to school in Bracebridge and worked as an accountant for Abitibi Power and Paper Company for twenty years. He and his wife Ethel raised four children.

== Politics ==
He was elected in the 1951 provincial election in the riding of Cochrane North. He defeated Liberal candidate J.A. Habel by 476 votes. He was re-elected in 1955. In 1952, he was appointed as Minister of Mines by Premier Leslie Frost during a minor cabinet shuffle.

=== Northern Ontario Natural Gas ===
In the early 1950s, Trans-Canada Pipeline was building a natural gas pipeline eastward across Canada. When it reached Ontario, it said that it would not build branch pipelines to individual communities and sought local Ontario companies to provide that service. Kelly's nephew, Gordon McLean co-founded a company called Northern Ontario Natural Gas (NONG) to supply natural gas to northern Ontario communities. While Kelly did not own shares in the company, he gave $5,000 to McLean for startup funds in NONG and made an agreement with McLean to share any profits.

When TCPL announced their intention to build the pipeline through Ontario, Premier Frost recognized this as a prominent issue and order his cabinet not to become financially involved in the pipeline business. Kelly ignored this directive and in addition gave advice to fellow cabinet ministers Clare Mapledoram and William Griesinger to purchase shares in the company. He also shared the advice with John Wintermeyer who was leader of the Ontario Liberal Party.

By 1957, NONG had cornered the natural gas market in Northern Ontario. Shares in the company were split 500 to 1. Kelly's initial investment of $5,000 soared to $500,000. Kelly and McLean's investment became so involved that they created holding company called Kelmac Oils to help manage their money. Word of Kelly's business dealings reached the Premier's office who felt that "it was not appropriate for the Minister of Mines to dispense 'hot tips'". On July 8, 1957, Frost ordered Kelly to come to his office and asked for his resignation from cabinet. Reports in the newspapers at the time said that Kelly cited business pressures as the reason. He later admitted that the NONG situation was the real reason for leaving cabinet. Some reports said that Frost had Kelly's resignation already typed up before the meeting but Kelly wrote the resignation himself.

News of NONG became public in March 1958 when Donald MacDonald the leader of the Ontario CCF accused Frost of collusion in the affair. Frost denied the allegations but information about the stock holdings of his cabinet ministers was revealed. Kelly resigned his seat in January 1958.

=== Cabinet posts ===
Frost ministry, Province of Ontario (1949–1961)
Cabinet post (1)
Predecessor	Office	Successor
Welland Gemmell	Minister of Mines; 1952-1957	Wilf Spooner

== Later life ==
After leaving the Ontario legislature, Kelly attempted to run as a candidate in the 1958 Canadian federal election but he failed to win a nomination. In 1962, he became leader of the provincial Social Credit Party of Ontario party for a brief period, was nominated by the Social Credit Party of Canada as its candidate in Broadview against Progressive Conservative cabinet minister George Hees in the 1962 Canadian federal election but was disqualified for not having enough signatures on his nomination forms, after 16 signatures were struck off for not being on the official voters list. He ran unsuccessfully as an independent candidate in the riding of Cochrane in the 1965 federal election.

He moved to Smooth Rock Falls near Cochrane where he bought and operated a hotel. He served as a town councillor for seven years and was mayor for two terms. He died in 1985 at the age of 83.
