= Louis-Pierre Cécile =

Canadian politician

Ontario MPP
- In office 1948–1967
- Preceded by: Aurélien Bélanger
- Succeeded by: Riding abolished
- Constituency: Prescott

Personal details
- Born: January 15, 1905 Tecumseh, Ontario
- Died: February 19, 1995 (aged 90)
- Party: Progressive Conservative
- Spouse: Fabienne Gascon (m. 1941)

Louis-Pierre Cécile (January 15, 1905 – February 19, 1995) was an Ontario lawyer and political figure. He represented Prescott in the Legislative Assembly of Ontario from 1948 to 1967 as a Progressive Conservative member.

He was born in Tecumseh, Ontario in 1905, the son of Arthur-Lewis Cécile, and studied at the Université de Montréal and Osgoode Hall. In 1941, he married Fabienne Gascon. He was chairman of the Secondary School Board for Hawkesbury. He ran unsuccessfully for a seat in the federal parliament in 1945. Cécile was Minister of Travel and Publicity in the provincial cabinet from 1949 to 1955 and Minister of Public Welfare from 1955 to 1966.

== Cabinet positions ==
Robarts ministry, Province of Ontario (1961–1971)
Cabinet post (1)
Predecessor	Office	Successor
Bill Goodfellow	Minister of Public Welfare; 1961-1966	John Yaremko
Frost ministry, Province of Ontario (1949–1961)
Cabinet post (1)
Predecessor	Office	Successor
Bill Goodfellow	Minister of Public Welfare; 1955-1961	John Yaremko
Kennedy ministry, Province of Ontario (1948–1949)
Cabinet post (1)
Predecessor	Office	Successor
George Arthur Welsh	Minister of Travel and Publicity; 1948-1955	Bryan Cathcart
