= Office of the Mining & Lands Commissioner =

Agency of Ontario's Ministry of Natural Resources

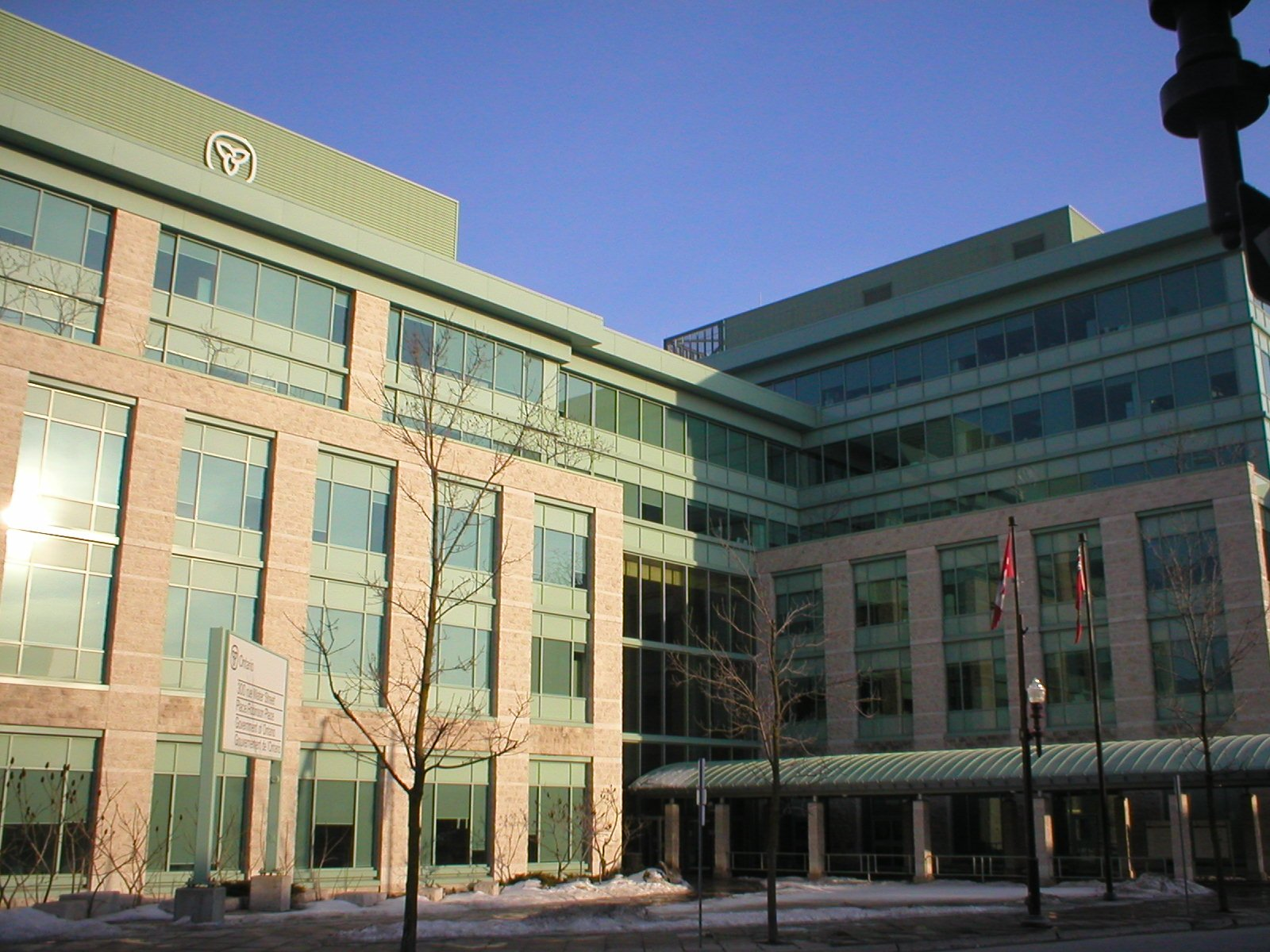
The Ministry of Natural Resources headquarters at Robinson Place on Water Street in Peterborough.

The Office of the Mining and Lands Commissioner is an agency of the Ministry of Natural Resources (MNR) in the Canadian province of Ontario.

The current Commissioner is Linda M. Kamerman.

== History ==
The Office of the Mining and Lands Commissioner will have been in existence, as of May 2006, in one form or another, for one hundred years. The legislation that deals with the vast mineral resources in Ontario dates back to 1864. The Mining Convention of 1905 followed on the heels of an exciting silver discovery in Cobalt, Ontario in 1903. It was felt that mining activity needed to be more regulated and that a Mining Commissioner should be appointed to decide disputes between claimants. The result was the Mines Act of 1906. While there had been mining laws in Ontario dating back to 1864, the Mines Act of 1906 was a comprehensive revision and update to those laws.

Legislators looking for a suitable template for the Mining and Lands Commissioner turned to the legislation establishing the Drainage Referee (The Drainage Trials Act, 1891) for their inspiration. The major difference between the two was that mining dealt with the disposition of Crown property and associated unpatented rights which had not been dealt with by the ordinary courts, while drainage dealt with ordinary property, claims and rights which would otherwise be heard in the ordinary Courts.

The original intention behind establishing a Mining and Lands Commissioner was to create a functionary who would deal with disputes under provincial mining legislation. The legislators recognizing that an independent judicial officer was needed (as opposed to ministers) to hear disputes. The presence of such an official would also free up ministers who were having to deal with increasingly time-consuming cases and would offer an accessible and affordable venue for members of the mining industry who obviously needed an adjudicator to quickly and effectively sort out their disputes. The Mining and Lands Commissioner is assisted by deputies and, in addition to being called upon to deal with matters arising under legislation other than the Mining Act, can also expect to hear what used to be called summary conviction cases (now provincial offences).

== Responsibilities ==
Today’s Commissioner is the first female appointee. In her role as an inferior court of review, the Commissioner is still required to hear disputes under the Mining Act and to carry out the role of “ultimate interpreter of the Act”. As in the past, she can still be called on to deal with summary conviction cases (now referred to as provincial offences). Unlike her brethren of the past though, she can expect to deal with legal issues that have become both increasingly complex and costly. And unlike the Commissioners of the first fifty years, she can expect to hold hearings under the Conservation Authorities Act, the Oil, Gas and Salt Resources Act, the Lakes and Rivers Improvement Act and the Assessment Act.

Changes to jurisdiction aside, the Mining and Lands Commissioner carries on maintaining a rich decision-making tradition that reaches back one hundred years. Perhaps, quoting the 1988 government Green Paper that explained the 1989 changes to the Mining Act can serve to sum things up quite nicely. The resulting legislation closely resembles today’s version.

“The powers and procedures of the Commissioner under today’s Mining Act are similar to those of the courts, although proceedings easily accommodate participants without legal counsel and provide quick settlement of disputes. The Commissioner is appointed by Order-in-Council under the Ministry of Natural Resources Act...Recommendation – The Mining and Lands Commissioner provides a quick and effective means of settling disputes and accordingly, the Office of Commissioner should be retained.”

== See also ==
- Ministry of Natural Resources (MNR)
