= Ray Connell =

Canadian politician

Ontario MPP
- In office 1967–1971
- Preceded by: New riding
- Succeeded by: Don Ewen
- Constituency: Wentworth North
- In office 1951–1967
- Preceded by: Russell Kelly
- Succeeded by: Riding abolished
- Constituency: Hamilton—Wentworth

Personal details
- Born: December 1, 1916 West Flamborough, Ontario
- Died: November 14, 1986 (aged 69) Hamilton, Ontario
- Party: Progressive Conservative
- Spouse: Irene Brenn
- Children: 2
- Occupation: Farmer

Thomas Ray Connell (December 1, 1916 – November 14, 1986) was a politician in Ontario, Canada. He was a Progressive Conservative member of the Legislative Assembly of Ontario from 1951 to 1971. He represented the ridings of Hamilton—Wentworth and Wentworth North. He was a member of cabinet in the governments of Leslie Frost and John Robarts.

== Background ==
A farmer, Connell married Irene Brenn in 1942. They raised two children, Allan and Brenda.

== Politics ==
First elected in the general election in 1951, Connell was re-elected in the general elections in 1955, 1959, 1963, and 1967. During his first term in office, he served on variety of Standing Committees.

On November 1, 1956, he was appointed to Leslie Frost's cabinet as a Minister without Portfolio and, on April 28, 1958, he was appointed as the Minister of Reform Institutions. On December 22, 1958, he was promoted to a senior Cabinet post, as Minister of Public Works, which he would go on to hold for a remarkable eleven years. On June 5, 1969, having already indicated that he would not be running in the next general election, Connell was dropped from Cabinet and he retired in 1971.

== Later life ==
After retiring from politics, Connell became involved with the horse racing industry. He set about to develop a horse racing facility in the Flamborough area, north of Hamilton, Ontario. He secured three large investors and, in 1972, work began on the construction of what came to be known as Flamboro Downs racetrack. Connell served as President of the company until the mid-1980s.

He died November 14, 1986, in Hamilton.

Robarts ministry, Province of Ontario (1961–1971)
Cabinet post (1)
Predecessor	Office	Successor
James Allan	Minister of Public Works; 1958-1969	John Simonett
Frost ministry, Province of Ontario (1949–1961)
Cabinet posts (2)
Predecessor	Office	Successor
Matthew Dymond	Minister of Reform Institutions; 1958 (April–December)	George Wardrope
Sub-Cabinet Post
Predecessor	Title	Successor
	Minister without portfolio (1956-1958)	
