= 1949 Progressive Conservative Party of Ontario leadership election =

- Date: April 27, 1949
- Convention: Royal York Hotel, Toronto
- Resigning leader: George Drew
- Won by: Leslie Frost
- Ballots: 1
- Candidates: 4

A leadership election was held by the Progressive Conservative Party of Ontario on April 27, 1949 to replace retiring leader and premier George Drew who had resigned after losing his seat in the 1948 provincial election and deciding to enter federal politics. The interim leader of the party (and interim premier) was Thomas Laird Kennedy. The party selected Leslie Frost on the first ballot.

- FROST, Leslie 842
- BLACKWELL, Leslie 442
- ROBERTS, Kelso 121
- PORTER, Dana 65

== See also ==
- Progressive Conservative Party of Ontario leadership conventions
