= Ministry of Northern Economic Development and Growth =

Former provincial ministry of Ontario, Canada

- Ministère du Développement et de la croissance économique du Nord (French)
- Government of Ontario wordmark

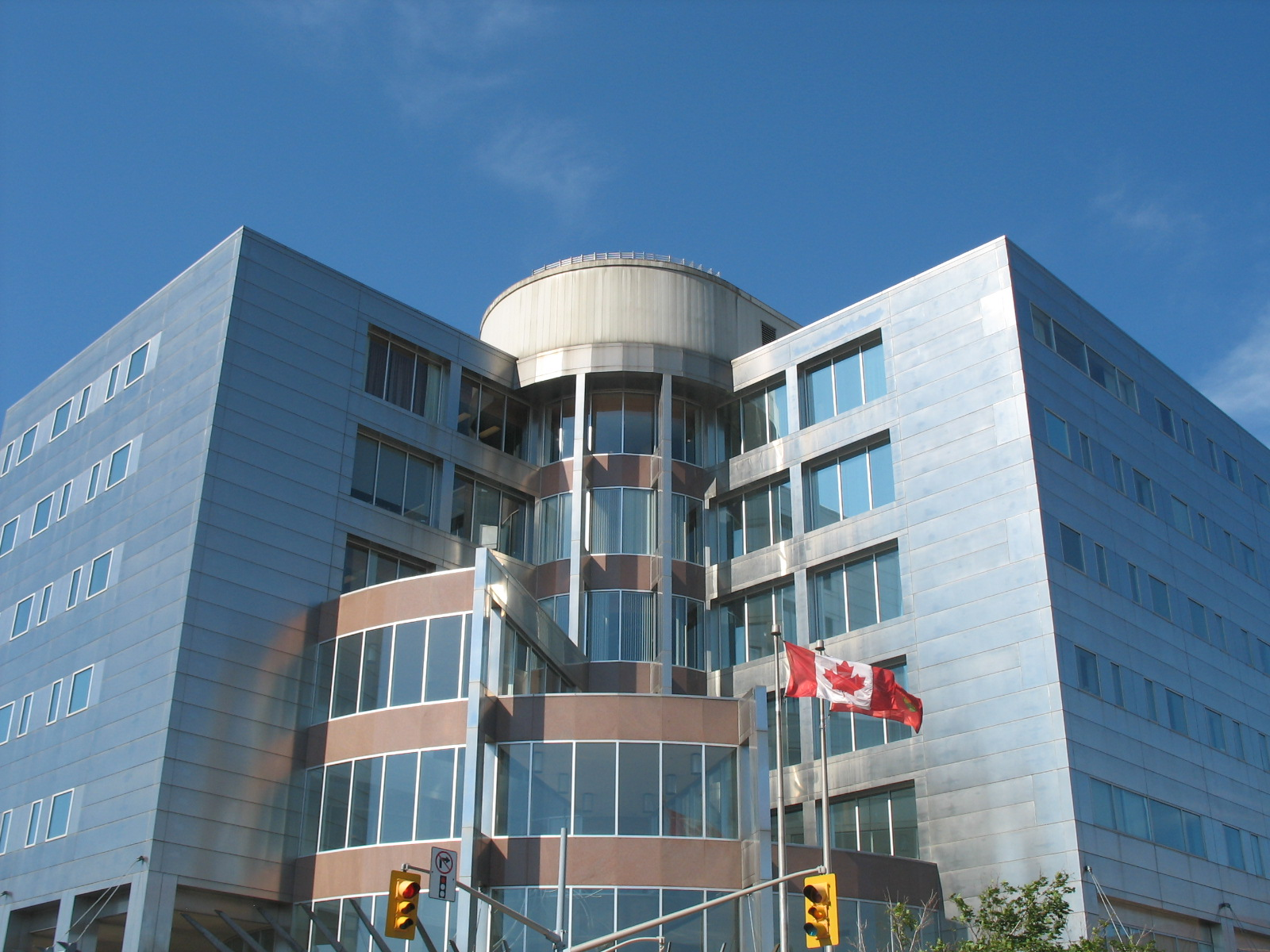
- Ministry headquarters in Greater Sudbury

Ministry overview
- Preceding Ministry: Ministry of Energy, Northern Development and Mines
- Jurisdiction: Government of Ontario
- Headquarters: 159 Cedar Street and 933 Ramsey Lake Road Greater Sudbury, Ontario
- Ministers responsible: Hon. Greg Rickford, Minister of Energy, Northern Development and Mines; Dave Smith, Parliamentary Assistant to the Minister of Energy, Northern Development and Mines
- Website: ontario.ca/page/ministry-northern-economic-development-and-growth

The Ministry of Northern Economic Development and Growth is a ministry responsible for social and economic development in Northern Ontario.

In 2021, then Canadian Premier Doug Ford separated the Ministry of Energy, Northern Development and Mines into the Ministry of Energy and the Ministry of Northern Development, Mines, Natural Resources and Forestry, by merging the ministry (excluding Energy, which was made into its own portfolio) with the Ministry of Natural Resources and Forestry.

The Ministry of Northern Development, Mines, Natural Resources, and Forestry (MNDMNRF) in Ontario was reorganized into separate ministries on June 6, 2024. This reorganization resulted in the creation of the Ministry of Mines, the Ministry of Northern Development, and the Ministry of Natural Resources and Forestry.

In 2025, current Premier Doug Ford again reorganized by merging the Ministry of Mines with the Ministry of Energy, forming the new Ministry of Energy and Mines.

== History ==
- 1842 - Geological Survey of Canada formed by the Province of Canada
- 1846 - Commissioner of Crown Lands (Province of Canada) assumed control for mines and mining.
- 1867 - Responsibility for mines and mining transferred to the Ontario Commissioner of Crown Lands. The Montreal-based Geological Survey of Canada became part of the new federal government and moved to Ottawa in 1881.
- 1890 - Royal Commission on Ontario's Mineral Resources (Chairman, John M. Charlton)
- 1891 - Ontario Bureau of Mines established with Archibald Blue as its first director.
- 1905 – The first cabinet minister from Northern Ontario, Sudbury's Frank Cochrane, is appointed. Cochrane serves as minister of the new Department of Lands, Forests and Mines until 1911.
- 1912 – The Department creates a Northern Development Branch to further support growth in the North. In 1926, this branch becomes the Department of Northern Development.
- 1930s – The Department of Northern Development merges with the Department of Highways. Its purpose: to build and maintain roads and bridges in Northern Ontario.
- 1970 – The government creates a new Department of Mines and Northern Affairs in response to northerners' concerns about the lack of access to provincial government information. Twenty-four Northern Affairs offices in the region bring the Ontario government to northerners. This department changes name and responsibilities throughout the 1970s and early 1980s due to government restructuring.
- 1985 – The government creates a new Ministry of Northern Affairs and Mines. Later that year, the name becomes the Ministry of Northern Development and Mines. The change emphasizes the province's commitment to greater social and economic development in the north.
- 1990 – The ministry headquarters are re-located to two new buildings in Sudbury.
- 2009 – The realignment of forestry from the Ministry of Natural Resources to the Ministry of Northern Development and Mines is announced reflecting the importance of forestry to many northern and rural communities. The renamed Ministry of Northern Development, Mines and Forestry now leads the business and economic aspects of forestry, including industrial strategy, forest sector competitiveness programs, softwood lumber and wood allocation, pricing and licensing.
- 2011 – Forestry is once again allocated back to the Ministry of Natural Resources and the name shortened to its original 'Ministry of Northern Development and Mines'. Honourable Minister Rick Bartolucci, former Minister of Community Safety and Correctional services, is appointed Minister of Northern Development and Mines on October 20.
- 2013 - Premier Kathleen Wynne appoints Michael Gravelle as Minister of Northern Development and Mines, on February 11.
- 2018 - Premier Doug Ford appoints Greg Rickford as Minister of Northern Development and Mines, on June 29.
- 2019 - Premier Doug Ford renames the Ministry to Ministry of Energy, Northern Development and Mines.
- 2021 - Premier Doug Ford separates the Ministry to Ministry of Energy and Ministry of Natural Resources & Forestry, Northern Development and Mines
- 2024 - Premier Doug Ford separates the Ministries to Ministry of Natural Resources & Forestry, Ministry of Northern Development and Ministry of Mines
- 2025 - Premier Doug Ford merges the Ministry of Energy and Ministry of Mines to for the Ministry of Energy and Mines

== List of ministers ==
=== 1867–1970 ===
| Period | Name | Minister (Commissioner before 1905) |
|---|---|---|
| 1867–1905 | Department of Crown Lands | Stephen Richards, 1867–1871; Matthew Crooks Cameron, July–December 1871; Richard William Scott, 1871–1873; Timothy Blair Pardee, 1873–1889; Arthur Sturgis Hardy, 1889–1896; John Morison Gibson, 1896–1899; Elihu Davis, 1899–1904; Alexander Grant MacKay, 1904–1905; James Joseph Foy, February–May 1905 |
| 1905–1906 | Department of Lands and Mines | Francis Cochrane |
| 1906–1920 | Department of Lands, Forests and Mines | Francis Cochrane, 1906–1911; William Howard Hearst, 1911–1914; Howard Ferguson, 1914–1919 |
| 1906–1970 | Department of Mines | Harry Mills, 1920–1923; Charles McCrea, 1923–1934; Paul Leduc, 1934–1940; Robert Laurier, 1940–1943; Leslie Frost, 1943–1949; Welland Gemmell, 1949–1952; Philip Kelly, 1952–1957; Wilf Spooner, 1957–1958; James Anthony Maloney, 1958–1961; George Wardrope, 1961–1967; Allan Lawrence, 1968–1970 |

=== 1970 to present ===
| Period | Name | Minister |
|---|---|---|
| 1970–1972 | Ministry of Mines and Northern Affairs | Allan Lawrence, 1970–1971; Leo Bernier, 1971–1972 |
| 1977–1985 | Ministry of Northern Affairs | Leo Bernier, 1977–1985 |
| June 1985–November 1985 | Ministry of Mines and Northern Affairs | René Fontaine, June–November 1985 |
| 1985–1987 | Ministry of Northern Development and Mines | René Fontaine, 1985–1986; David Peterson, 1986–1987 |
| 1987–1991 | Ministry of Mines | Sean Conway, 1987–1989; Hugh O'Neil, 1989–1990; Gilles Pouliot, 1990–1991 |
| 1987–1991 | Ministry of Northern Development | René Fontaine, 1987–1990; Shelley Martel, 1990–1991 |
| 1991–1995 | Ministry of Northern Development and Mines | Shelley Martel, 1991–1994; Gilles Pouliot, 1994–1995 |
| 1995–1997 | Ministry of Natural Resources, Northern Development and Mines | Chris Hodgson, 1995–1997 |
| 1997–2009 | Ministry of Northern Development and Mines | Chris Hodgson, 1997–1999; Tim Hudak, 1999–2001; Dan Newman, 2001–2002; Jim Wilson, 2002–2003; Rick Bartolucci, October 23, 2003 – October 30, 2007; Michael Gravelle, October 30, 2007 – June 24, 2009 |
| 2009–2011 | Ministry of Northern Development, Mines and Forestry | Michael Gravelle, June 24, 2009 – October 20, 2011 |
| 2011–2019 | Ministry of Northern Development and Mines | Rick Bartolucci, October 20, 2011 – February 11, 2013; Michael Gravelle, 2013–2018; Hon. Greg Rickford, 2018-2019 |
| 2019–2021 | Ministry of Energy, Northern Development and Mines | Hon. Greg Rickford, 2019-2021 |

== Ministry agencies ==
- Council of The Association of Professional Geoscientists of Ontario
- Independent Electricity System Operator
- Northern Ontario Heritage Fund Corporation
- Ontario Energy Board
- Ontario Power Generation

== OBM Progress Medal ==
The OBM Progress Medal was given out by the Ontario Bureau of Mines and the Ministry of Northern Development and Mines in 1991 to celebrate 100 years of progress. Featuring a Trillium grandiflorum laid over a Pickaxe, the Medal weighs 17 grams.
