= Leslie Frost =

Canadian politician (1895–1973)

The Honourable Leslie Frost PC CC QC
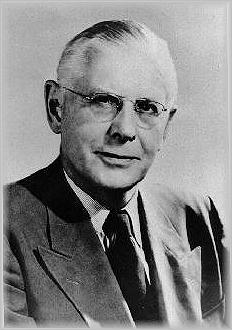
- Frost in 1950

16th Premier of Ontario
- In office May 4, 1949 – November 8, 1961
- Monarchs: George VI; Elizabeth II
- Lieutenant Governor: Ray Lawson; Louis Orville Breithaupt; John Keiller MacKay
- Preceded by: Thomas Kennedy
- Succeeded by: John Robarts

Member of the Legislative Assembly of Ontario for Victoria
- In office October 6, 1937 – May 16, 1963
- Preceded by: William Newman
- Succeeded by: Ronald Glen Hodgson

Personal details
- Born: Leslie Miscampbell Frost; September 20, 1895 Orillia, Ontario, Canada
- Died: May 4, 1973 (aged 77) Lindsay, Ontario, Canada
- Resting place: Riverside Cemetery
- Party: Ontario PC Party
- Spouse: Gertrude Carew (m. 1926; died 1970)
- Education: University of Toronto; Osgoode Hall Law School

Military service
- Allegiance: Canada
- Branch/service: Canadian Army
- Years of service: 1916-1918
- Rank: Captain
- Unit: 157th Battalion (Simcoe Foresters)
- Battles/wars: World War I

Leslie Miscampbell Frost PC CC QC (September 20, 1895 – May 4, 1973) was a politician in Ontario, Canada, who served as the province's 16th premier from May 4, 1949, to November 8, 1961. Due to his lengthy tenure, he gained the nickname "Old Man Ontario"; he was also known as "the Silver Fox".

== Early years ==
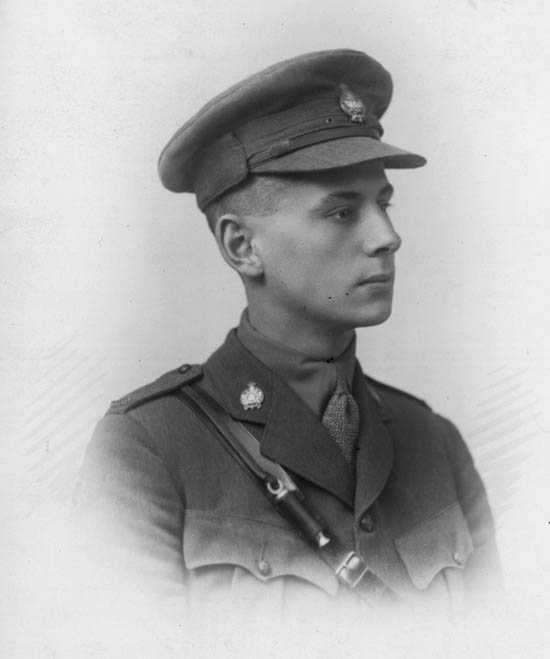
Leslie Frost, 1916

Leslie Miscampbell Frost was born in Orillia, Ontario, on September 20, 1895. He was the son of William Sword Frost and Margaret Jane Barker. His father was a jeweller and mayor of Orillia; his mother was an important figure in the early days of The Salvation Army. His second name, Miscampbell, came from a close friend of his father, Andrew Miscampbell, a Member of Provincial Parliament for the area.

He attended the University of Toronto and Osgoode Hall Law School. During World War I, he was an officer with 'C' Company 157th Battalion (Simcoe Foresters), CEF, and served with the 20th Battalion (Central Ontario) in France and Belgium. In 1918, after being wounded, he was discharged with the rank of Captain. He was called to the Bar in 1921.

In 1926, he married Gertrude Jane Carew. They had no children. The couple lived in Lindsay, Ontario, but Frost preferred his property at Pleasant Point on Sturgeon Lake north of Lindsay. When Frost and his brother, Cecil Gray Frost, first moved to Lindsay to establish a law practice, they rented a building at Pleasant Point that had been the community store and commuted to town by steamer. Frost bought the property in 1925 and, in about 1950, bought adjacent property where he built the winterized log cabin that was his refuge while he was premier and in retirement.

== Early political career ==
In 1937, he was first elected to the Ontario legislature and thereafter never lost an election. He was the Treasurer of Ontario and Minister of Mines from 1943 to 1955. Frost was chosen as leader of the Ontario Progressive Conservative Party (the "Tories") following Premier George Drew's decision to enter federal politics.

== Premier of Ontario ==
Due to his lengthy tenure as Ontario's premier, he gained the nickame "Old Man Ontario." He was also dubbed "The Laird of Lindsay" by the opposition at Queen's Park. Frost led the province during the economic boom of the 1950s. His low-key approach garnered him the nickname "The Great Tranquilizer". Combining small-town values with progressive policies, he took the Tories through three successive electoral victories winning majority governments in 1951, 1955 and 1959.

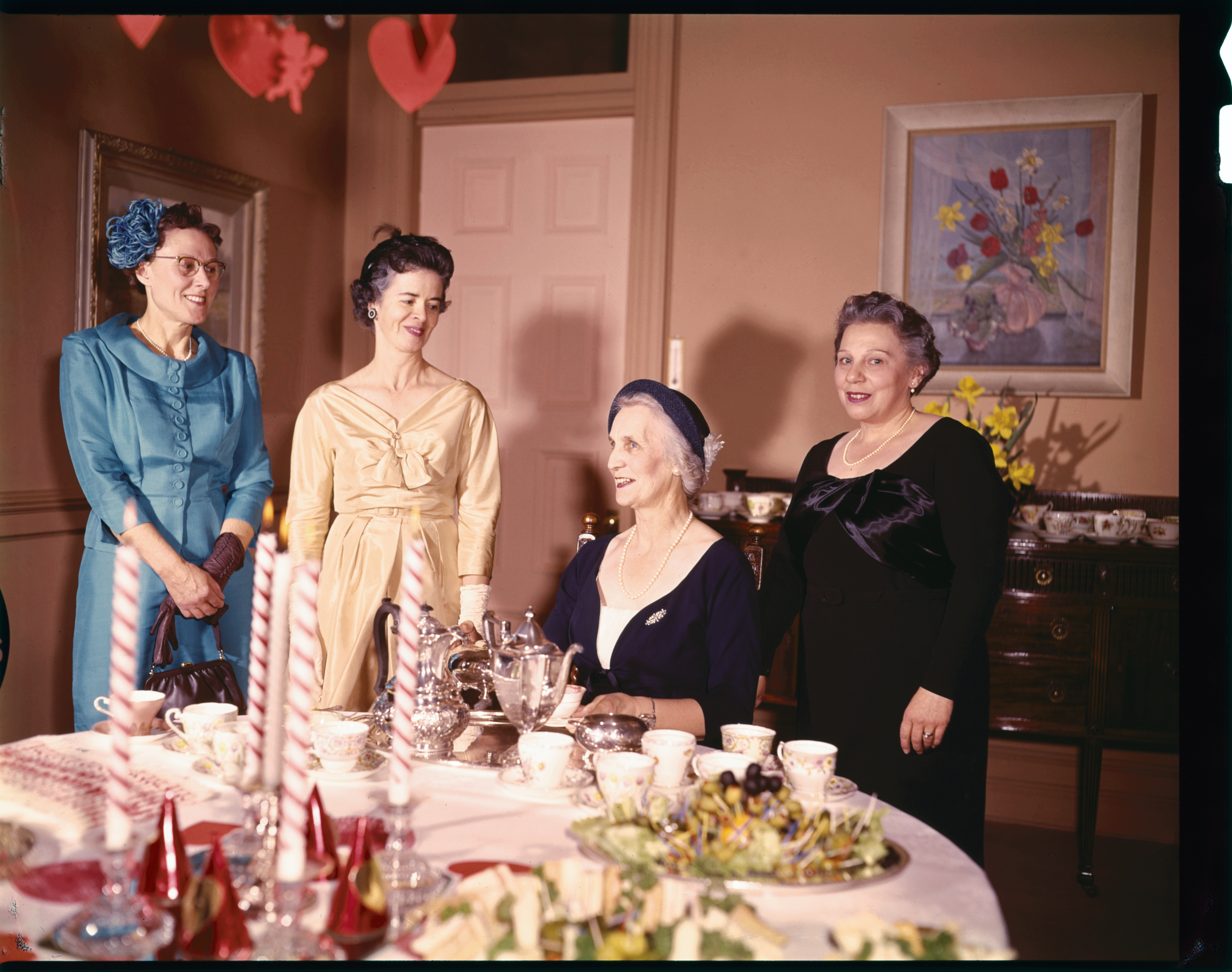
Mrs. Gertrude Frost attending a tea for the opening of the Legislature, 1960

=== Economic policy ===
Frost's government also attempted to wrest control of the income tax from the federal government, but failed, resulting in the introduction of a provincial sales tax. Frost expanded health care coverage for Ontarians through the creation of the Hospital Services Commission of Ontario Act and the Ontario Hospital Insurance Plan. By 1960, 94% of the population of Ontario was enrolled in the Ontario Hospital Insurance Plan.

Frost's government oversaw substantial expansion in public services and substantially increased public investment in the economy, as well as through strong fiscal policies.

=== Education policy ===
Under Frost, the number of universities in Ontario increased from four to twelve. As finance minister in 1943, the total provincial investment in education was just over $13 million. Upon his retirement in 1961, the education budget for Ontario was $250 million.

=== Social policy ===
The Frost government was the first to pass laws providing penalties for racial, ethnic, and gender discrimination on private property; these laws, introduced in the early 1950s as the Fair Employment Practices Act and Fair Accommodation Practices Act, started a movement in Ontario politics that produced the Ontario Human Rights Code in 1962 and later legislation. Frost's government also introduced legislation to ensure women received equal wages. His government also introduced voting rights for First Nations. When confronted by J.A. McGibbon, a judge from Lindsay and fellow fishing companion, regarding an anti-discrimination law about property, Frost told him that his attitudes towards people of colour were out of date.

Frost's government oversaw great expansion in the role of government. Under his leadership, Ontario greatly expanded its schools, highways and hospitals. He blamed his 1934 election loss on the poor state of roads in the Kawartha Lakes region and Ontario in general. Under his leadership Ontario created the 400 series of superhighways, most notably the Macdonald-Cartier Freeway better known as Highway 401, at the time, the longest controlled-access highway in the world at 820 kilometres (510 mi).

Frost's government oversaw the federation of the old City of Toronto with twelve surrounding municipalities to become Metropolitan Toronto.

=== Retirement ===
Frost resigned in 1961, and was succeeded as Tory leader and Premier by John Robarts.

== After politics ==
Upon retirement from politics, Frost served on the Board of Governors of the University of Toronto. As well, he was a member of the Board of Directors of the Bank of Montreal, KVP, Canada Life, and Trans Canada Air. Between 1954 and 1969 he also served as Vice-President of the Champlain Society and as its Honorary Vice-President from 1969 to 1973. He served as Chancellor of Trent University from 1967 to 1973. In retirement, he continued his interest in the outdoors. Near the end of his life, he undertook for the government of Ontario an exhaustive investigation of the state and potential of Algonquin Provincial Park. In the last interview he gave, just before he died, to the Toronto Star, he declared: "I am an environmentalist."

== Honours ==
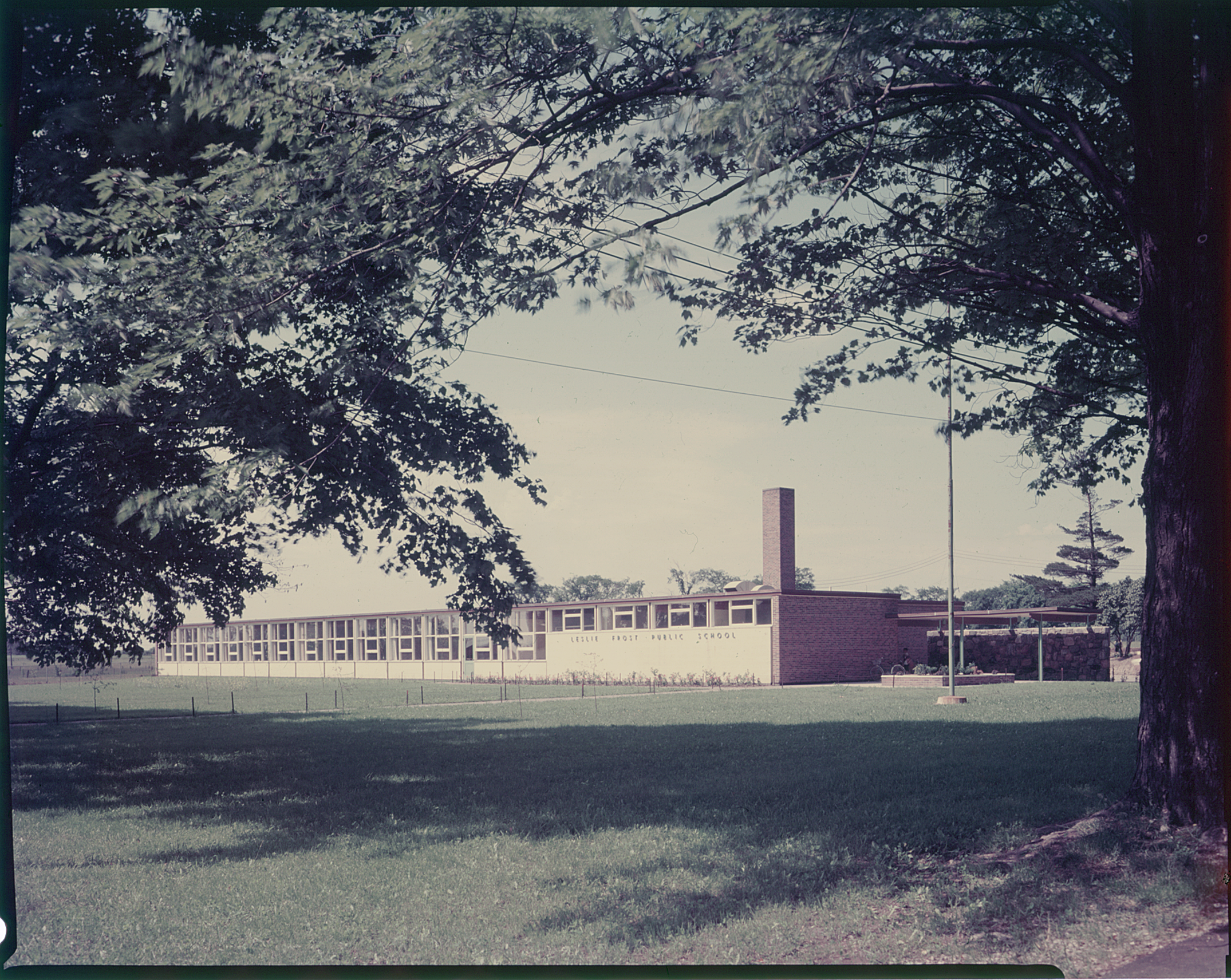
Leslie Frost Public School in Lindsay, 1953

In 1969, he was made a Companion of the Order of Canada, Canada's highest civilian honour.

Various places across Ontario are named for Frost:

- Frost Building, Toronto - houses the Ontario Ministry of Finance and the Ontario Management Board Secretariat, at Queen's Park, was named in his honour.
- Frost Centre for Canadian Studies and Indigenous Studies, Peterborough, Ontario - at Trent University,
- Leslie Frost Library at Glendon College (York University), Toronto
- Frost Campus at Fleming College, Lindsay, Ontario
- Leslie Frost Public School, Lindsay, Ontario - a school
- Leslie Frost Lane - a street in Pleasant Point on Sturgeon Lake with an adddress of Lindsay, Ontario
- Frost Lane - a cul-de-sac in Lindsay, Ontario
- Frost Centre Institute - formerly the Leslie M. Frost Natural Resource Centre, operated a private educational facility in Haliburton County offering secondary school credits.
- Portrait of Frost resides at Trent University

== Selected bibliography ==
- Frost, Leslie M.; Mitchell Nelson, Grace (1965). Pleasant Point Story: a History of Pleasant Point. Together with a reprint of A History of Pleasant Point Union Church by Grace Mitchell Nelson, as an appendix. Leslie Frost. OCLC 62945191.
- Frost, Leslie M. (1966). The record on Sir Sam Hughes set straight. Fenelon Falls: Arthur W. Robson. OCLC 1097255375.
- Frost, Leslie M. (1967). Fighting Men. Foreword by Thomas H.B. Symons. Toronto: Clarke, Irwin. OCLC 222577595.
- Frost, Leslie M. (1973). Forgotten Pathways of the Trent. Don Mills: Burns & MacEachern. ISBN 0-88768-037-2.

Frost ministry, Province of Ontario (1949–1961)
Cabinet post (1)
Predecessor	Office	Successor
Dana Porter	Minister, Department of Economics; 1958 (February–April)	James Allan
Kennedy ministry, Province of Ontario (1948–1949)
Drew ministry, Province of Ontario (1943–1948)
Cabinet posts (2)
Predecessor	Office	Successor
Robert Laurier	Minister of Mines; 1943-1949	Welland Gemmell
Arthur Gordon	Treasurer of Ontario; 1943-1955	Dana Porter
Academic offices
Preceded by New position	Chancellor of Trent University; 1967–1973	Succeeded by Eugene Forsey
