= 23rd Parliament of Ontario =

The 23rd Legislative Assembly of Ontario was in session from June 2, 1948, until October 6, 1951, just prior to the 1951 general election. The majority party was the Ontario Progressive Conservative Party, however its leader, George Drew, lost his seat in the 1948 general election and soon after resigned as party leader to enter federal politics and take the leadership of the Progressive Conservative Party of Canada. He was replaced on October 19, 1948, by Thomas Laird Kennedy who served as premier and interim Progressive Conservative leader until Leslie Frost became party leader and succeeded Kennedy as premier on May 4, 1949.

The official opposition was led by Ted Jolliffe of the Co-operative Commonwealth Federation (CCF).

M.C. Davies served as speaker for the assembly.

On April 5, 1951, the Fair Employment Practices Act and the Female Employees Fair Remuneration Act were passed. The first act introduced fines and a complaint procedure to deal with discrimination based on race or religion in hiring practices. The second act was intended to ensure that female workers were paid the same wage as a male worker doing the same work for the same employer.

== Members of the Assembly ==
Riding	Member	Party	First elected / previously elected	No. of terms
Addington	John Abbott Pringle	Progressive Conservative	1943	3rd term
Algoma—Manitoulin	John Arthur Fullerton	Progressive Conservative	1945	2nd term
Beaches	Reid Scott	Co-operative Commonwealth	1948	1st term
Bellwoods	Albert Alexander MacLeod	Labour-Progressive	1943	3rd term
Bracondale	Harry Lindley Walters	Co-operative Commonwealth	1948	1st term
Brant	Harry Corwin Nixon	Liberal	1919	9th term
Brantford	George Thomas Gordon	Liberal	1948	1st term
Bruce	T. Kenzie Foster	Liberal	1948	1st term
Carleton	Donald Hugo Morrow	Progressive Conservative	1948	1st term
Cochrane North	John Carrère	Progressive Conservative	1948	1st term
Cochrane North	Marcel Léger (1949)	Progressive Conservative	1949	1st term
Cochrane South	Bill Grummett	Co-operative Commonwealth	1943	3rd term
Dovercourt	George Eamon Park	Co-operative Commonwealth	1948	1st term
Dufferin—Simcoe	Alfred Wallace Downer	Progressive Conservative	1937	4th term
Durham	John Weir Foote	Progressive Conservative	1948	1st term
Eglinton	Leslie Blackwell	Progressive Conservative	1943	3rd term
Elgin	Fletcher Stewart Thomas	Progressive Conservative	1945	2nd term
Essex North	Gordon Bennett Ellis	Co-operative Commonwealth	1948	1st term
Essex South	William Murdoch	Progressive Conservative	1943	3rd term
Fort William	Charles Winnans Cox	Liberal	1934, 1948	3rd term*
Glengarry	Osie Villeneuve	Progressive Conservative	1948	1st term
Grenville—Dundas	George Holmes Challies	Progressive Conservative	1929	6th term
Grey North	Mackinnon Phillips	Progressive Conservative	1945	2nd term
Grey South	Farquhar Robert Oliver	Liberal	1926 (Note: First elected as United Farmers)	7th term
Haldimand—Norfolk	Charles Hammond Martin	Progressive Conservative	1944	3rd term
Halton	Stanley Leroy Hall	Progressive Conservative	1943	3rd term
Hamilton Centre	Robert Desmond Thornberry	Co-operative Commonwealth	1943, 1948	2nd term*
Hamilton East	John Lawrence Dowling	Co-operative Commonwealth	1948	1st term
Hamilton—Wentworth	Russell Temple Kelley	Progressive Conservative	1945	2nd term
Hastings East	Roscoe Robson	Progressive Conservative	1943	3rd term
Hastings West	Elmer Sandercock	Progressive Conservative	1948	1st term
High Park	William Horace Temple	Co-operative Commonwealth	1948	1st term
Huron	Thomas Pryde	Progressive Conservative	1948	2nd term
Huron—Bruce	John William Hanna	Progressive Conservative	1943	3rd term
Kenora	James George White	Progressive Conservative	1948	1st term
Kent East	Edward B. McMillan	Liberal	1948	1st term
Kent West	George William Parry	Progressive Conservative	1945	2nd term
Kingston	Harry Allan Stewart	Progressive Conservative	1943	3rd term
Lambton East	Charles Eusibius Janes	Progressive Conservative	1945	2nd term
Lambton West	Bryan Lewis Cathcart	Progressive Conservative	1945	2nd term
Lanark	George Henry Doucett	Progressive Conservative	1937	4th term
Leeds	Walter Bain Reynolds	Progressive Conservative	1937	4th term
Leeds	Hugh Alexander Reynolds (1949)	Progressive Conservative	1949	1st term
Lincoln	Charles Daley	Progressive Conservative	1943	3rd term
London	Campbell Carlyle Calder	Liberal	1948	1st term
Middlesex North	Thomas L. Patrick	Progressive Conservative	1943	3rd term
Middlesex South	Harry Marshall Allen	Progressive Conservative	1945	2nd term
Muskoka—Ontario	George Arthur Welsh	Progressive Conservative	1945	2nd term
Niagara Falls	William Houck	Liberal	1934, 1948	3rd term*
Nipissing	William Bruce Harvey	Progressive Conservative	1948	1st term
Northumberland	William Arthur Goodfellow	Progressive Conservative	1943	3rd term
Ontario	T.D. Thomas	Co-operative Commonwealth	1948	1st term
Ottawa East	Aurele Chartrand	Liberal	1945	2nd term
Ottawa South	George Harrison Dunbar	Progressive Conservative	1937	4th term
Oxford	Thomas Roy Dent	Progressive Conservative	1943	3rd term
Parkdale	Lloyd F. K. Fell	Co-operative Commonwealth	1948	1st term
Parry Sound	Charles Wilson Cragg	Progressive Conservative	1948	1st term
Parry Sound	Allister Johnston (1948)	Progressive Conservative	1948	1st term
Peel	Thomas Laird Kennedy	Progressive Conservative	1919, 1937	8th term*
Perth	James Frederick Edwards	Progressive Conservative	1945	2nd term
Peterborough	Harold Robinson Scott	Progressive Conservative	1943	3rd term
Port Arthur	Frederick Oliver Robinson	Co-operative Commonwealth	1943	3rd term
Prescott	Louis-Pierre Cécile	Progressive Conservative	1948	1st term
Prince Edward—Lennox	John Donald Baxter	Liberal	1948	1st term
Rainy River	James Melvin Newman	Liberal-Labour	1945	2nd term
Renfrew North	Stanley Joseph Hunt	Progressive Conservative	1943	3rd term
Renfrew South	James Shannon Dempsey	Progressive Conservative	1945	2nd term
Riverdale	Leslie Emery Wismer	Co-operative Commonwealth	1943, 1948	2nd term*
Russell	Joseph Daniel Nault	Progressive Conservative	1948	1st term
Sault Ste. Marie	George Isaac Harvey	Co-operative Commonwealth	1943	3rd term
Simcoe Centre	George Graham Johnston	Progressive Conservative	1943	3rd term
Simcoe East	John Duncan McPhee	Progressive Conservative	1943	3rd term
St. Andrew	Joseph Baruch Salsberg	Labour-Progressive	1943	3rd term
St. David	William David Dennison	Co-operative Commonwealth	1943, 1948	2nd term*
St. George	Dana Harris Porter	Progressive Conservative	1943	3rd term
St. Patrick	Charles Edward Rea	Progressive Conservative	1948	1st term
Stormont	John Lawrence McDonald	Progressive Conservative	1943, 1948	2nd term*
Sudbury	Welland Stewart Gemmell	Progressive Conservative	1948	1st term
Timiskaming	Calvin Howard Taylor	Co-operative Commonwealth	1943	3rd term
Victoria	Leslie Miscampbell Frost	Progressive Conservative	1937	4th term
Waterloo North	John George Brown	Liberal	1948	1st term
Waterloo South	Theodore Henry Isley	Co-operative Commonwealth	1948	1st term
Welland	Harold William Walker	Liberal	1948	1st term
Wellington North	Ross Atkinson McEwing	Liberal	1937	4th term
Wellington South	William Ernest Hamilton	Progressive Conservative	1945	2nd term
Wentworth	Joseph Lees Easton	Co-operative Commonwealth	1948	1st term
Windsor—Sandwich	William Griesinger	Progressive Conservative	1945	2nd term
Windsor—Walkerville	M.C. Davies	Progressive Conservative	1945	2nd term
Woodbine	Bertram Elijah Leavens	Co-operative Commonwealth	1943, 1948	2nd term*
York East	Agnes Campbell MacPhail	Co-operative Commonwealth	1943, 1948	2nd term*
York North	Addison Alexander MacKenzie	Progressive Conservative	1945	2nd term
York South	Edward Bigelow Jolliffe	Co-operative Commonwealth	1943, 1948	2nd term*
York West	Charles Hibbert Millard	Co-operative Commonwealth	1943, 1948	2nd term*

== Timeline ==
23rd Legislative Assembly of Ontario - Movement in seats held (1948-1951)
Party	1948	Gain/(loss) due to		1951
Party	1948	Death in office	Byelection hold	1951
Progressive Conservative	53	(3)	3	53
Co-operative Commonwealth	21			21
Liberal	13			13
Labor–Progressive	2			2
Liberal–Labour	1			1
Total	90	(3)	3	90

Changes in seats held (1948–1951)
Seat	Before				Change		
Seat	Date	Member	Party	Reason	Date	Member	Party
Parry Sound	August 19, 1948	Charles Cragg	█ PC	Died in office	December 9, 1948	Allister Johnston	█ PC
Cochrane North	October 6, 1948	John Carrère	█ PC	Died in office	June 8, 1949	Marcel Léger	█ PC
Leeds	March 12, 1949	Walter Bain Reynolds	█ PC	Died in office	October 31, 1949	Hugh Reynolds	█ PC
