= Cochrane North (provincial electoral district) =

Former provincial electoral district in Ontario, Canada

Ontario electoral district

Defunct provincial electoral district
- Legislature: Legislative Assembly of Ontario
- District created: 1914
- District abolished: 1996
- First contested: 1914
- Last contested: 1995

Cochrane North was a provincial electoral district in Ontario, Canada. It was created in 1914 as the riding of Cochrane. In 1926 the riding was split into Cochrane North and Cochrane South. It was abolished in 1996 before the 1999 election.

From the 1987 election until its abolition, the riding included most of the District of Cochrane (except Timmins, the geographic townships bordering Timmins on the west, Iroquois Falls, and all the communities and townships south of a line extending east from the northern boundary of Iroquois Falls to Lake Abitibi and then all communities and townships south of Lake Abitibi). The riding also included the two geographic townships in Algoma District immediately south of Hearst and all of Kenora District east of the prolongation of the westerly border of Cochrane District. The riding was abolished in 1998 into Timmins—James Bay, Algoma—Manitoulin and Timiskaming—Cochrane. Prior to 1926, the riding was known as Cochrane.

== Members of Provincial Parliament ==
Cochrane North
| Assembly | Years | Member | Party |
|---|---|---|---|
Cochrane
| 14th | 1914–1919 | Malcolm Lang | Liberal |
| 15th | 1919–1923 | Malcolm Lang | Liberal |
| 16th | 1923–1926 | Malcolm Lang | Liberal |
Cochrane North
| 17th | 1926–1929 | Albert Waters | Conservative |
| 18th | 1929–1934 | Albert Waters | Conservative |
| 19th | 1934–1937 | Joseph-Anaclet Habel | Liberal |
| 20th | 1937–1943 | Joseph-Anaclet Habel | Liberal |
| 21st | 1943–1945 | John Joseph Kehoe | Co-operative Commonwealth |
| 22nd | 1945–1948 | Joseph-Anaclet Habel | Liberal |
| 23rd | 1948–1948 | John Carrère | Progressive Conservative |
| 23rd | 1949–1951 | Marcel Léger | Progressive Conservative |
| 24th | 1951–1955 | Philip Kelly | Progressive Conservative |
| 25th | 1955–1958 | Philip Kelly | Progressive Conservative |
| 25th | 1958–1959 | René Brunelle | Progressive Conservative |
| 26th | 1959–1963 | René Brunelle | Progressive Conservative |
| 27th | 1963–1967 | René Brunelle | Progressive Conservative |
| 28th | 1967–1971 | René Brunelle | Progressive Conservative |
| 29th | 1971–1975 | René Brunelle | Progressive Conservative |
| 30th | 1975–1977 | René Brunelle | Progressive Conservative |
| 31st | 1977–1981 | René Brunelle | Progressive Conservative |
| 32nd | 1981–1985 | René Piché | Progressive Conservative |
| 33rd | 1985–1987 | René Fontaine | Liberal |
| 34th | 1987–1990 | René Fontaine | Liberal |
| 35th | 1990–1995 | Len Wood | New Democratic |
| 36th | 1995–1999 | Len Wood | New Democratic |
Sourced from the Ontario Legislative Assembly
Merged into Timmins—James Bay, Algoma—Manitoulin and Timiskaming—Cochrane before the 1999 election

== Election results ==
=== Cochrane North (1926–1999) ===
1995 Ontario general election
| Party | Candidate | Votes | % | ±% |
|---|---|---|---|---|
| New Democratic | Len Wood | 6,935 | 45.62 | +5.15 |
| Liberal | Gilles Gagnon | 4,952 | 32.57 | –7.02 |
| Progressive Conservative | Louis Veilleux | 3,316 | 21.81 | +1.87 |
| Total valid votes | | 15,203 | 99.04 | |
| Total rejected, unmarked and declined ballots | | 148 | 0.96 | +0.38 |
| Turnout | | 15,351 | 58.96 | –3.21 |
| Eligible voters | | 26,037 | | |
| New Democratic hold | | Swing | | +6.08 |
Source: Elections Ontario

1990 Ontario general election
| Party | Candidate | Votes | % | ±% |
|---|---|---|---|---|
| New Democratic | Len Wood | 6,618 | 40.47 | +5.68 |
| Liberal | Donald Genier | 6,475 | 39.59 | –18.25 |
| Progressive Conservative | René Piché | 3,261 | 19.94 | +12.57 |
| Total valid votes | | 16,354 | 99.42 | |
| Total rejected, unmarked and declined ballots | | 96 | 0.58 | +0.00 |
| Turnout | | 16,450 | 62.16 | –0.93 |
| Eligible voters | | 26,462 | | |
| New Democratic gain from Liberal | | Swing | | +11.96 |
Source: Elections Ontario

1987 Ontario general election
| Party | Candidate | Votes | % | ±% |
|---|---|---|---|---|
| Liberal | René Fontaine | 9,436 | 57.84 | –25.18 |
| New Democratic | Len Wood | 5,675 | 34.79 | – |
| Progressive Conservative | J.G. Denis Latulippe | 1,203 | 7.37 | – |
| Total valid votes | | 16,314 | 99.42 | |
| Total rejected ballots | | 95 | 0.58 | –3.94 |
| Turnout | | 16,409 | 63.09 | +22.82 |
| Eligible voters | | 26,009 | | |
| Liberal hold | | Swing | | –12.59 |
Source: Elections Ontario

Ontario provincial by-election, August 14, 1986 Resignation of René Fontaine due to conflict of interest disclosures
| Party | Candidate | Votes | % | ±% |
|---|---|---|---|---|
| Liberal | René Fontaine | 8,463 | 83.02 | +35.63 |
| Independent | Bertrand Proulx | 766 | 7.51 | – |
| Independent | Judith Code | 606 | 5.94 | – |
| Independent | Graham Edward McCready | 185 | 1.81 | – |
| Libertarian | Kathleen Sargent | 99 | 0.97 | – |
| Independent | John Turmel | 75 | 0.74 | – |
| Total valid votes | | 10,194 | 95.49 | |
| Total rejected ballots | | 482 | 4.51 | +4.12 |
| Turnout | | 10,676 | 40.27 | –28.44 |
| Eligible voters | | 26,514 | | |
| Liberal hold | | Swing | | +17.81 |
Source: Elections Ontario

1985 Ontario general election
| Party | Candidate | Votes | % | ±% |
|---|---|---|---|---|
| Liberal | René Fontaine | 8,793 | 47.39 | +12.36 |
| Progressive Conservative | René Piché | 6,883 | 37.10 | +0.91 |
| New Democratic | Andre Maurice Philippe | 2,878 | 15.51 | –11.59 |
| Total valid votes | | 18,554 | 99.60 | |
| Total rejected ballots | | 74 | 0.40 | +0.07 |
| Turnout | | 18,628 | 68.70 | +6.22 |
| Eligible voters | | 27,114 | | |
| Liberal gain from Progressive Conservative | | Swing | | +5.72 |
Source: Elections Ontario

1981 Ontario general election
| Party | Candidate | Votes | % | ±% |
|---|---|---|---|---|
| Progressive Conservative | René Piché | 5,910 | 36.19 | –25.25 |
| Liberal | Jean-Paul Bourgeault | 5,722 | 35.04 | +20.35 |
| New Democratic | Emil Touchette | 4,426 | 27.10 | +3.22 |
| Libertarian | Richard Coatsworth | 274 | 1.68 | – |
| Total valid votes | | 16,332 | 99.67 | |
| Total rejected ballots | | 54 | 0.33 | –0.42 |
| Turnout | | 16,386 | 62.48 | –4.45 |
| Eligible voters | | 26,224 | | |
| Progressive Conservative hold | | Swing | | –22.80 |
Source: Elections Ontario

1977 Ontario general election
| Party | Candidate | Votes | % | ±% |
|---|---|---|---|---|
| Progressive Conservative | René Brunelle | 10,412 | 61.44 | –0.65 |
| New Democratic | Robert Fortin | 4,047 | 23.88 | +1.03 |
| Liberal | Frank Levay | 2,488 | 14.68 | –0.38 |
| Total valid votes | | 16,947 | 99.25 | |
| Total rejected ballots | | 128 | 0.75 | +0.23 |
| Turnout | | 17,075 | 66.94 | +0.92 |
| Eligible voters | | 25,509 | | |
| Progressive Conservative hold | | Swing | | –0.84 |
Source: Elections Ontario

1975 Ontario general election
| Party | Candidate | Votes | % | ±% |
|---|---|---|---|---|
| Progressive Conservative | René Brunelle | 9,987 | 62.09 | –1.94 |
| New Democratic | Rene Brixhe | 3,676 | 22.85 | –10.03 |
| Liberal | Bernie Labonte | 2,423 | 15.06 | +11.96 |
| Total valid votes | | 16,086 | 99.48 | |
| Total rejected ballots | | 84 | 0.52 | –0.35 |
| Turnout | | 16,170 | 66.02 | –10.19 |
| Eligible voters | | 24,492 | | |
| Progressive Conservative hold | | Swing | | +4.05 |
Source: Elections Ontario

1971 Ontario general election
| Party | Candidate | Votes | % | ±% |
|---|---|---|---|---|
| Progressive Conservative | René Brunelle | 11,212 | 64.02 | +5.39 |
| New Democratic | Rene Brixhe | 5,758 | 32.88 | +5.35 |
| Liberal | Philip Kelly | 543 | 3.10 | –10.75 |
| Total valid votes | | 17,513 | 99.13 | |
| Total rejected ballots | | 154 | 0.87 | +0.21 |
| Turnout | | 17,667 | 76.21 | +9.03 |
| Eligible voters | | 23,182 | | |
| Progressive Conservative hold | | Swing | | +0.02 |
Source: Elections Ontario

1967 Ontario general election
| Party | Candidate | Votes | % | ±% |
|---|---|---|---|---|
| Progressive Conservative | René Brunelle | 7,536 | 58.63 | +8.35 |
| New Democratic | Gerald Jannetteau | 3,538 | 27.52 | +12.11 |
| Liberal | Roland Bradette | 1,780 | 13.85 | –16.49 |
| Total valid votes | | 12,854 | 99.34 | |
| Total rejected ballots | | 86 | 0.66 | –0.06 |
| Turnout | | 12,940 | 67.18 | +2.80 |
| Eligible voters | | 19,262 | | |
| Progressive Conservative hold | | Swing | | –1.88 |
Source: Elections Ontario

1963 Ontario general election
| Party | Candidate | Votes | % | ±% |
|---|---|---|---|---|
| Progressive Conservative | René Brunelle | 6,443 | 50.28 | +5.25 |
| Liberal | Raymond J. Braun | 3,887 | 30.33 | –4.08 |
| New Democratic | Elmo Stanislas Lefebvre | 1,975 | 15.41 | –5.15 |
| Independent | Jean Paul Martel | 509 | 3.97 | – |
| Total valid votes | | 12,814 | 99.28 | |
| Total rejected ballots | | 93 | 0.72 | –0.16 |
| Turnout | | 12,907 | 64.37 | –3.80 |
| Eligible voters | | 20,050 | | |
| Progressive Conservative hold | | Swing | | +4.67 |
Source: Elections Ontario

1959 Ontario general election
| Party | Candidate | Votes | % | ±% |
|---|---|---|---|---|
| Progressive Conservative | René Brunelle | 5,596 | 45.03 | –12.53 |
| Liberal | Roland Bradette | 4,277 | 34.41 | +13.05 |
| Co-operative Commonwealth | Barney Gallant | 2,555 | 20.56 | +5.88 |
| Total valid votes | | 12,428 | 99.12 | |
| Total rejected ballots | | 110 | 0.88 | +0.13 |
| Turnout | | 12,538 | 68.18 | +5.04 |
| Eligible voters | | 18,390 | | |
| Progressive Conservative hold | | Swing | | –12.79 |
Source: Elections Ontario

Ontario provincial by-election, May 12, 1958 Resignation of Philip Kelly
| Party | Candidate | Votes | % | ±% |
|---|---|---|---|---|
| Progressive Conservative | René Brunelle | 6,469 | 57.56 | +3.54 |
| Liberal | Courtney V. Sunstrum | 2,401 | 21.36 | –0.68 |
| Co-operative Commonwealth | J. Barney Adelard Gallant | 1,650 | 14.68 | –9.25 |
| Action League | Robert L. Bechard | 426 | 3.79 | – |
| Independent | Kelly Chamandy | 293 | 2.61 | – |
| Total valid votes | | 11,239 | 99.25 | |
| Total rejected ballots | | 85 | 0.75 | –0.46 |
| Turnout | | 11,324 | 63.14 | –1.41 |
| Eligible voters | | 17,936 | | |
| Progressive Conservative hold | | Swing | | +2.11 |
Source: Elections Ontario

1955 Ontario general election
| Party | Candidate | Votes | % | ±% |
|---|---|---|---|---|
| Progressive Conservative | Philip Kelly | 5,943 | 54.02 | +13.74 |
| Co-operative Commonwealth | Elmo Stanislas Lefebvre | 2,633 | 23.93 | –0.13 |
| Liberal | Courtney Sunstrum | 2,425 | 22.04 | –13.61 |
| Total valid votes | | 11,001 | 98.79 | |
| Total rejected ballots | | 135 | 1.21 | +0.24 |
| Turnout | | 11,136 | 64.55 | –2.29 |
| Eligible voters | | 17,253 | | |
| Progressive Conservative hold | | Swing | | +6.94 |
Source: Elections Ontario

1951 Ontario general election
| Party | Candidate | Votes | % | ±% |
|---|---|---|---|---|
| Progressive Conservative | Philip Kelly | 4,009 | 40.28 | –26.51 |
| Liberal | Joseph-Anaclet Habel | 3,548 | 35.65 | – |
| Co-operative Commonwealth | Norman J. Lacasse | 2,395 | 24.07 | –9.14 |
| Total valid votes | | 9,952 | 99.02 | |
| Total rejected ballots | | 98 | 0.98 | –0.18 |
| Turnout | | 10,050 | 66.84 | –1.45 |
| Eligible voters | | 15,037 | | |
| Progressive Conservative hold | | Swing | | –13.26 |
Source: Elections Ontario

Ontario provincial by-election, June 8, 1949 Death of John Carrère
| Party | Candidate | Votes | % | ±% |
|---|---|---|---|---|
| Progressive Conservative | Marcel Léger | 6,383 | 66.80 | +29.90 |
| Co-operative Commonwealth | Roy W. Kenney | 3,173 | 33.20 | +8.36 |
| Total valid votes | | 9,556 | 98.84 | |
| Total rejected ballots | | 112 | 1.16 | +0.26 |
| Turnout | | 9,668 | 68.29 | –10.26 |
| Eligible voters | | 14,158 | | |
| Progressive Conservative hold | | Swing | | +10.77 |
Source: Elections Ontario

1948 Ontario general election
| Party | Candidate | Votes | % | ±% |
|---|---|---|---|---|
| Progressive Conservative | John Carrère | 3,838 | 36.89 | +15.92 |
| Co-operative Commonwealth | Albert W. Stephenson | 2,585 | 24.85 | –10.80 |
| Liberal | Joseph-Anaclet Habel | 2,321 | 22.31 | –16.76 |
| Union of Electors | Gilles Lefebvre | 1,659 | 15.95 | – |
| Total valid votes | | 10,403 | 99.10 | |
| Total rejected ballots | | 94 | 0.90 | +0.11 |
| Turnout | | 10,497 | 78.55 | –0.84 |
| Eligible voters | | 13,364 | | |
| Progressive Conservative gain from Liberal | | Swing | | +16.34 |
Source: Elections Ontario

1945 Ontario general election
| Party | Candidate | Votes | % | ±% |
|---|---|---|---|---|
| Liberal | Joseph-Anaclet Habel | 3,573 | 39.07 | –1.96 |
| Co-operative Commonwealth | John Joseph Kehoe | 3,260 | 35.64 | –10.54 |
| Progressive Conservative | Michel Halle | 1,918 | 20.97 | +8.18 |
| Labor–Progressive | Richard Dick Burton | 395 | 4.32 | – |
| Total valid votes | | 9,146 | 99.22 | |
| Total rejected ballots | | 72 | 0.78 | –0.10 |
| Turnout | | 9,218 | 79.39 | +5.59 |
| Eligible voters | | 11,611 | | |
| Liberal gain from Co-operative Commonwealth | | Swing | | +6.25 |
Source: Elections Ontario

1943 Ontario general election
| Party | Candidate | Votes | % | ±% |
|---|---|---|---|---|
| Co-operative Commonwealth | John Joseph Kehoe | 3,709 | 46.18 | – |
| Liberal | Joseph-Anaclet Habel | 3,295 | 41.03 | –11.52 |
| Progressive Conservative | Michel Halle | 1,027 | 12.79 | –34.66 |
| Total valid votes | | 8,031 | 99.12 | |
| Total rejected ballots | | 71 | 0.88 | –0.35 |
| Turnout | | 8,102 | 73.80 | +1.06 |
| Eligible voters | | 10,978 | | |
| Co-operative Commonwealth gain from Liberal | | Swing | | +5.76 |
Source: Elections Ontario

1937 Ontario general election
| Party | Candidate | Votes | % | ±% |
|---|---|---|---|---|
| Liberal | Joseph-Anaclet Habel | 4,940 | 52.55 | –0.86 |
| Conservative | Albert Victor Waters | 4,460 | 47.45 | +13.99 |
| Total valid votes | | 9,400 | 98.77 | |
| Total rejected ballots | | 117 | 1.23 | –0.04 |
| Turnout | | 9,517 | 72.74 | –7.08 |
| Eligible voters | | 13,083 | | |
| Liberal hold | | Swing | | –7.42 |
Source: Elections Ontario

1934 Ontario general election
| Party | Candidate | Votes | % | ±% |
|---|---|---|---|---|
| Liberal | Joseph-Anaclet Habel | 5,304 | 53.41 | +35.27 |
| Conservative | Albert Victor Waters | 3,323 | 33.46 | –10.16 |
| Co-operative Commonwealth | Charles S. Giles | 770 | 7.75 | – |
| Labour | Edward J. Stephenson | 534 | 5.38 | +2.51 |
| Total valid votes | | 9,931 | 98.73 | |
| Total rejected ballots | | 128 | 1.27 | +0.19 |
| Turnout | | 10,059 | 79.83 | +16.07 |
| Eligible voters | | 12,601 | | |
| Liberal gain from Conservative | | Swing | | +22.71 |
Source: Elections Ontario

1929 Ontario general election
| Party | Candidate | Votes | % | ±% |
|---|---|---|---|---|
| Conservative | Albert Victor Waters | 3,121 | 43.62 | –10.73 |
| Independent Conservative | Joseph R. Tremblay | 2,531 | 35.37 | – |
| Liberal | Frederick D. Foster | 1,298 | 18.14 | – |
| Independent | Edward J. Stephenson | 205 | 2.87 | – |
| Total valid votes | | 7,155 | 98.92 | |
| Total rejected ballots | | 78 | 1.08 | +0.28 |
| Turnout | | 7,233 | 63.76 | +7.54 |
| Eligible voters | | 11,344 | | |
| Conservative hold | | Swing | | –5.37 |
Source: Elections Ontario

1926 Ontario general election
| Party | Candidate | Votes | % | ±% |
|---|---|---|---|---|
| Conservative | Albert Victor Waters | 2,886 | 54.35 | – |
| Independent Liberal | Joseph Mastai Labrosse | 2,424 | 45.65 | – |
| Total valid votes | | 5,310 | 99.20 | |
| Total rejected ballots | | 43 | 0.80 | – |
| Turnout | | 5,353 | 56.22 | – |
| Eligible voters | | 9,521 | | |
| Conservative gain from Liberal | | Swing | | – |
Source: Elections Ontario

=== Cochrane (1914–1926) ===
1923 Ontario general election: Cochrane
| Party | Candidate | Votes | % | ±% |
|---|---|---|---|---|
| Liberal | Malcolm Lang | 3,138 | 39.54 | –9.70 |
| Labour | John Vanier | 2,511 | 31.64 | +11.43 |
| Conservative | John Raymond O'Neill | 2,172 | 27.37 | –3.19 |
| Independent | Robert Fleming Seymour | 116 | 1.46 | – |
| Total valid votes | | 7,937 | 97.64 | |
| Total rejected ballots | | 192 | 2.36 | +2.36 |
| Turnout | | 8,129 | 42.91 | –14.71 |
| Eligible voters | | 18,943 | | |
| Liberal hold | | Swing | | –10.57 |
Source: Elections Ontario

1919 Ontario general election: Cochrane
| Party | Candidate | Votes | % | ±% |
|---|---|---|---|---|
| Liberal | Malcolm Lang | 2,951 | 49.24 | +7.17 |
| Conservative | Robert S. Potter | 1,831 | 30.55 | –10.61 |
| Labour | John Vanier | 1,211 | 20.21 | – |
| Total valid votes | | 5,993 | 100.00 | |
| Total rejected ballots | | – | | |
| Turnout | | 5,993 | 57.62 | +18.61 |
| Eligible voters | | 10,401 | | |
| Liberal hold | | Swing | | +8.89 |
Source: Elections Ontario

1914 Ontario general election: Cochrane
| Party | Candidate | Votes | % |
|---|---|---|---|
| Liberal | Malcolm Lang | 1,297 | 42.07 |
| Conservative | Richard A. Douglas | 1,269 | 41.16 |
| Socialist | John Walker | 517 | 16.77 |
| Total valid votes | | 3,083 | 98.37 |
| Total rejected ballots | | 51 | 1.63 |
| Turnout | | 3,134 | 39.01 |
| Eligible voters | | 8,033 | |
| Liberal pickup new district. | | | |
Source: Elections Ontario

== See also ==
- List of Ontario provincial electoral districts
- Canadian provincial electoral districts
