= René Fontaine =

Canadian politician

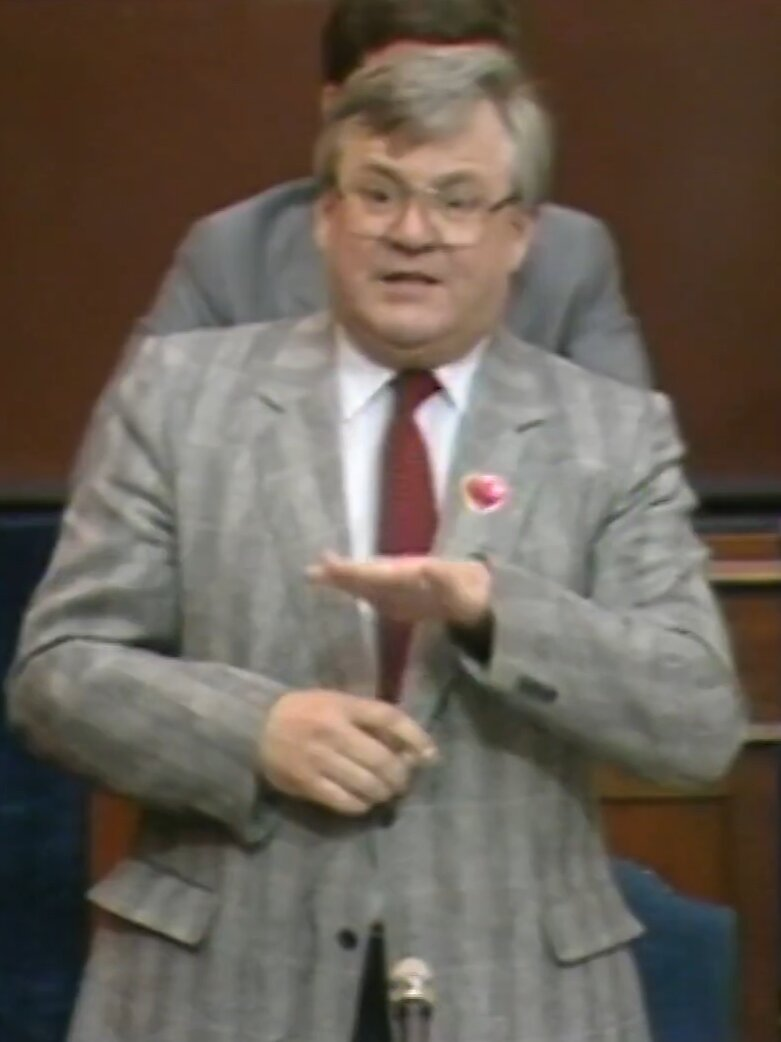
- Fontaine in 1986

Member of the Ontario Provincial Parliament for Cochrane North
- In office August 14, 1986 – September 6, 1990
- Succeeded by: Len Wood
- In office May 2, 1985 – June 26, 1986
- Preceded by: René Piché

Personal details
- Born: Jacques Noé René Fontaine; November 5, 1933 Harty, Ontario
- Died: March 17, 2012 (aged 78)
- Party: Liberal
- Occupation: Businessman

Jacques Noe René Fontaine (November 5, 1933 – March 17, 2012) was a politician in Ontario, Canada. He was a Liberal member of the Legislative Assembly of Ontario from 1985 to 1990, and was a cabinet minister in the government of David Peterson.

== Background ==
Fontaine was educated at the University of Ottawa. He was vice-president of a sawmill in Hearst. In 1977, he declared it a "bilingual municipality". Fontaine also served as president of Maison Renaissance and Arc en Ciel in Hearst.

== Politics ==
He served as a municipal councillor in the northern town of Hearst from 1963 to 1966, and was the town's mayor from 1967 to 1980.

He was elected to the Ontario legislature in the 1985 provincial election, defeating Progressive Conservative René Piché in Cochrane North, a large riding in the province's northeastern corner. Fontaine was the only Liberal MPP elected from northern Ontario, and was appointed to cabinet as Minister of Northern Affairs and Mines. In October 1985, Fontaine announced that the Ministry would be reorganized as the Ministry of Northern Development and Mines. He said the government would spend an additional $100 million in the north on development projects. Bud Wildman criticized the announcement as a one-shot infusion and that after five years there would be no more money.

In June 1986, opposition MPP Andy Brandt disclosed to the legislature that Fontaine had failed to disclose ownership of 17,000 shares in Golden Tiger, a mining company operating in Ontario and Quebec. Fontaine acknowledged his mistake, saying that he had forgotten to disclose the shares as required be Peterson's conflict-of-interest guidelines. He resigned both his portfolio and his seat in the legislature on June 26, stating that he wanted to be exonerated by the people of his riding in a by-election. The Progressive Conservatives and New Democratic Party refused to run candidates, and described the entire affair as farcical. Fontaine easily defeated a spread of minor candidates; he was not immediately re-appointed to cabinet, but served as a parliamentary assistant in the first part of 1987.

Peterson's Liberals won a landslide majority government in the 1987 provincial election, and Fontaine was re-elected by almost 4,000 votes over Len Wood of the NDP. He returned to cabinet as Minister of Northern Development, and retained this position until August 8, 1990. He did not seek re-election in the 1990 provincial election.

There is currently a Hearst (René Fontaine) Municipal Airport in Hearst.

=== Cabinet positions ===
Peterson ministry, Province of Ontario (1985–1990)
Cabinet posts (2)
Predecessor	Office	Successor
David Peterson (Note: Ministry of Northern Development and Mines was split between Fontaine and Sean Conway.)	Minister of Northern Development; 1987–1990	Shelley Martel
Leo Bernier (Note: Bernier was Minister of Northern Affairs.)	Minister of Northern Development and Mines (Note: Ministry reorganized November 1985.); 1985–1986	David Peterson
