= 2014 Middlesex County municipal elections =

Local election in Ontario, Canada

Elections were held in Middlesex County, Ontario on October 27, 2014 in conjunction with municipal elections across the province.

== Middlesex County Council ==
County Council consists of the mayors of each municipality plus the deputy mayors of the municipalities over 5,000 people.

Position	Elected
Adelaide Metcalfe Mayor	Kurtis Smith
Lucan Biddulph Mayor	Cathy Burghardt-Jesson
Middlesex Centre Mayor	Al Edmondson (acclaimed)
Middlesex Centre Deputy Mayor	Clare Bloomfield (acclaimed)
Newbury Reeve	Diane Brewer
North Middlesex Mayor	Don Shipway
North Middlesex Deputy Mayor	Brian Ropp
Southwest Middlesex Mayor	Vance E. Blackmore
Southwest Middlesex Deputy Mayor	Marigay Wilkins (acclaimed)
Strathroy Caradoc Mayor	Joanne Vanderheyden
Strathroy Caradoc Deputy Mayor	Brad Richards
Thames Centre Mayor	Jim Maudsley
Thames Centre Deputy Mayor	Marcel Meyer

== Adelaide Metcalfe ==
Mayoral Candidate	Vote	%
Kurtis Smith	664	57.44
David Bolton (X)	492	42.56

== Lucan Biddulph ==
Mayoral Candidate	Vote	%
Cathy Burghardt-Jesson	942	59.62
Paul Hodgins (X)	638	40.38

== Middlesex Centre ==
Mayoral Candidate	Vote	%
Al Edmondson (X)	Acclaimed	

== Newbury ==
Reeve Candidate	Vote	%
Diane Brewer (X)	115	54.25
Amos Fennell	97	45.75

== North Middlesex ==
Mayoral Candidate	Vote	%
Don Shipway (X)	1,261	50.93
Chuck Hall	1,215	49.07

== Southwest Middlesex ==
Mayoral Candidate	Vote	%
Vance E. Blackmore	1,116	50.38
Doug Reycraft (X)	1,099	49.62

== Strathroy-Caradoc ==
Mayoral Candidate	Vote	%
Joanne Vanderheyden (X)	4,496	79.69
Rick McLean	1,146	20.31

== Thames Centre ==
Mayoral Candidate	Vote	%
Jim Maudsley (X)	2,761	52.89
Harold McCutcheon	2,459	47.11
