= John Carrère =

John Carrère may refer to:

- John Merven Carrère (1858–1911), American architect
- John Carrère (politician) (died 1948), Canadian politician
