= John Joseph Kehoe =

Canadian politician and accountant

Ontario MPP
- In office 1943–1945
- Preceded by: Joseph-Anaclet Habel
- Succeeded by: Joseph-Anaclet Habel
- Constituency: Cochrane North

Personal details
- Born: August 28, 1891 King, Ontario
- Died: April 16, 1967 (aged 75) Toronto, Ontario
- Party: CCF
- Spouse: Muriel Grier (m. 1915)
- Occupation: Accountant

John Joseph Kehoe (August 28, 1891 – April 16, 1967) was an accountant and political figure in Ontario. He represented Cochrane North in the Legislative Assembly of Ontario from 1943 to 1945 as a Co-operative Commonwealth member.

The son of Michael J. Kehoe and Caroline Fuller, he was born in King township in 1891. In 1915, Kehoe married Muriel Grier. He lived in Kapuskasing.

He died at a Toronto hospital in 1967.
