= Jeff Yurek =

Canadian politician

The Honourable Jeff Yurek ECO
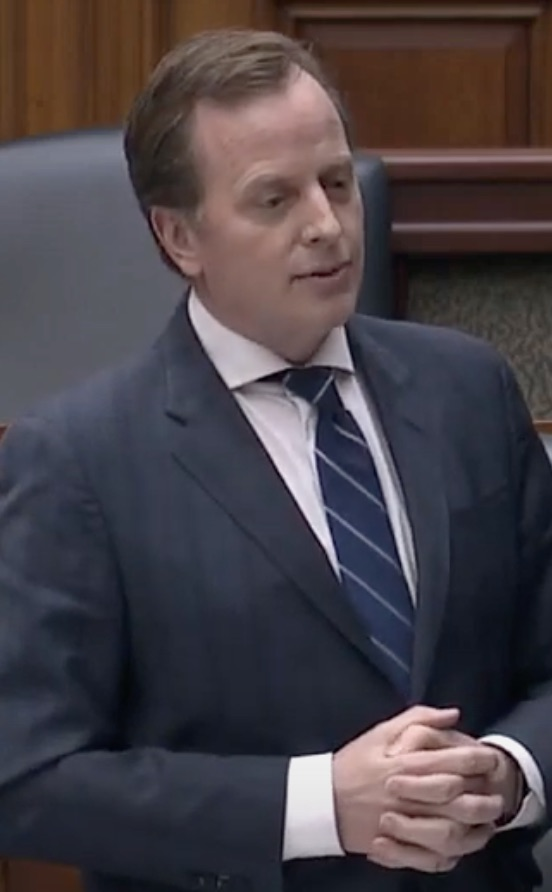
- Yurek in 2020

Ontario Minister of the Environment, Conservation and Parks
- In office June 20, 2019 – June 18, 2021
- Premier: Doug Ford
- Preceded by: Rod Phillips
- Succeeded by: David Piccini

Minister of Transportation
- In office November 5, 2018 – June 20, 2019
- Premier: Doug Ford
- Preceded by: John Yakabuski
- Succeeded by: Caroline Mulroney

Minister of Natural Resources and Forestry
- In office June 29, 2018 – November 5, 2018
- Premier: Doug Ford
- Preceded by: Nathalie Des Rosiers
- Succeeded by: John Yakabuski

Member of the Ontario Provincial Parliament for Elgin—Middlesex—London
- In office October 6, 2011 – February 28, 2022
- Preceded by: Steve Peters
- Succeeded by: Rob Flack

Personal details
- Born: Jeffrey Thomas Yurek; September 27, 1971 (age 55) St. Thomas, Ontario, Canada
- Party: Progressive Conservative
- Spouse: Jenn Yurek
- Children: 1
- Occupation: Pharmacist

Jeffrey Thomas Yurek ECO (born 1971) is a former Canadian politician in Ontario, Canada. He was a Progressive Conservative member of the Legislative Assembly of Ontario who represented the riding of Elgin—Middlesex—London. He was an MPP between 2011-2022.

== Background ==
Yurek was born and raised in St. Thomas, Ontario. He worked as a pharmacist in a family business with his brother. He lives with his wife Jenn and their daughter.

== Politics ==
Yurek ran in the 2011 provincial election as the Progressive Conservative candidate in the riding of Elgin—Middlesex—London. He defeated Liberal candidate Laurie Baldwin-Sands by 8,696 votes. He was re-elected in the 2014 provincial election defeating NDP candidate Kathy Cornish by 8,820 votes.

He was previously the party's health critic and later served in cabinet.

He put forward a private member's bill, that was passed unanimously, allowing students to carry lifesaving medicines on their person. The bill was named 'Ryan's Law', after a student died from having his medical inhaler locked in the principal's office

On June 20, 2019, he was named Minister of the Environment, Conservation and Parks.

On January 7, 2022, Yuruk announced that he wouldn't be seeking a 4th term and he would resign his seat at the end of February. He was succeeded by Rob Flack in the 2022 Ontario general election.

=== Election results ===
2018 Ontario general election
Party	Candidate	Votes	%	±%
Progressive Conservative	Jeff Yurek	29,264	55.46	+8.32
New Democratic	Amanda Stratton	16,923	32.07	+5.84
Liberal	Carlie Forsythe	3,857	7.31	-12.66
Green	Bronagh Morgan	2,029	3.85	-1.08
Libertarian	Richard Styve	300	0.57	
Freedom	Dave Plumb	278	0.53	-1.20
Objective Truth	Henri Barrette	116	0.22	
Total valid votes		52,767	99.02	
Total rejected, unmarked and declined ballots		524	0.98	
Turnout		53,291	59.45	
Eligible voters		89,636		
Progressive Conservative hold		Swing		+1.24
Source: Elections Ontario

2014 Ontario general election
Party	Candidate	Votes	%	±%
Progressive Conservative	Jeff Yurek	20,946	46.36	-1.50
New Democratic	Kathy Cornish	12,034	26.63	+4.36
Liberal	Serge Lavoie	9,183	20.32	-6.49
Green	John Fisher	2,236	4.95	+2.58
Freedom	Clare Maloney	784	1.74	+1.05
Total valid votes		45,183	100.0	
Total rejected, unmarked and declined ballots		682	1.51	
Turnout		45,865	54.00	
Eligible voters		84,970		
Progressive Conservative hold		Swing		-2.93
Source: Elections Ontario

2011 Ontario general election
Party	Candidate	Votes	%	±%
Progressive Conservative	Jeff Yurek	19,771	47.86	+17.40
Liberal	Lori Baldwin-Sands	11,075	26.81	-22.26
New Democratic	Kathy Cornish	9,201	22.27	+10.89
Green	Eric Loewen	981	2.37	-5.85
Freedom	Paul McKeever	283	0.69	-0.17
Total valid votes		41,311	100.00	
Total rejected, unmarked and declined ballots		154	0.37	
Turnout		41,465	51.28	
Eligible voters		80,858		
Progressive Conservative gain from Liberal		Swing		+19.83
Source: Elections Ontario

=== Cabinet positions ===
Ford ministry, Province of Ontario (2018–present)
Cabinet posts (3)
Predecessor	Office	Successor
Rod Phillips	Minister of the Environment, Conservation and Parks; June 20, 2019 – June 18, 2021	David Piccini
John Yakabuski	Minister of Transportation; November 5, 2018 – June 20, 2019	Caroline Mulroney
Nathalie Des Rosiers	Minister of Natural Resources and Forestry; June 29, 2018 – November 5, 2018	John Yakabuski
