= René Piché =

Canadian politician (1931–2011)

Ontario MPP
- In office 1981–1985
- Preceded by: René Brunelle
- Succeeded by: René Fontaine
- Constituency: Cochrane North

Personal details
- Born: May 5, 1931 Cache Bay, Ontario
- Died: January 22, 2011 (aged 79) Orleans, Ontario
- Party: Progressive Conservative
- Spouse: Olga Kowaluk
- Children: 4
- Occupation: Newspaper publisher
- Portfolio: Minister without portfolio (February–May 1985) responsible for northern transportation

René Louis Piché (May 5, 1931 – January 22, 2011) was a politician in Ontario, Canada. He was a Progressive Conservative member of the Legislative Assembly of Ontario from 1981 to 1985 who represented the northern Ontario riding of Cochrane North. He served as a minister without portfolio in the cabinet of Frank Miller. He was mayor of Kapuskasing from 1971 to 1980 and again from 1991 to 1993.

== Background ==
Piché was born in Cache Bay, Ontario in 1931 to parents Louis Piché and Églantine Nadon. He was one of four children. He lived in Kapuskasing and later Orleans, Ontario. In 1951, he married Olga Kowaluk and together they raised four children. In 1961 he founded a newspaper called the Northern Times and remained president and publisher until 1998. He was also the founding chairman of Northeastern Ontario Municipalities Action Group, serving for nine years as its chairman between 1972 and 1980. In addition, Piché served as a member of the Ontario Northland Transportation Commission for seven years from 1973 to 1980.

== Politics ==
In 1971, Piché was elected mayor of Kapuskasing and served in that position until 1980.

In the 1981 provincial election he ran as the Progressive Conservative candidate in the riding of Cochrane North, defeating Liberal candidate Jean-Paul Bourgeault by 188 votes. He served as a backbench supporter of Bill Davis's government for four years. In 1983 he was appointed as Parliamentary Assistant to the Minister of Revenue. When Frank Miller became Premier in 1985, he appointed Piché as Minister without portfolio responsible for northern transportation.

The Progressive Conservatives were reduced to a tenuous minority government in the 1985 provincial election. Piché was defeated losing to Liberal René Fontaine by 1,910 votes. He formally resigned from cabinet on May 17, 1985.

Piché attempted to return to the Ontario legislature in the 1990 provincial election, but finished third against New Democrat Len Wood.

He later returned to municipal politics, and again served as Kapuskasing's mayor in the 1991 and served one term until 1993.
