= Joseph-Anaclet Habel =

Canadian politician

- Official 1966 portrait

Member of Parliament for Cochrane
- In office 1953–1968
- Preceded by: Joseph-Arthur Bradette
- Succeeded by: Ralph Wesley Stewart

Ontario MPP
- In office 1945–1948
- Preceded by: John Joseph Kehoe
- Succeeded by: John Carrère
- In office 1934–1943
- Preceded by: Albert Waters
- Succeeded by: John Joseph Kehoe
- Constituency: Cochrane North

Personal details
- Born: July 13, 1895; Deschaillons, Quebec
- Died: December 5, 1979 (aged 84); Ottawa, Ontario
- Resting place: Kapuskasing Cemetery, Kapuskasing, Cochrane District, OntarioS
- Political party: Liberal
- Spouse: Estelle Belleau (m. 1921)
- Children: 2
- Occupation: Businessman

Joseph-Alphonse-Anaclet Habel (July 13, 1895 – December 5, 1979), usually known as Joseph-Anaclet Habel, was a Canadian politician.

Born in Deschaillons, Quebec, the son of Wenceslas Habel and Henriette Charland, he served in the Canadian Army during World War I. From 1919 to 1926, he ran a general store in Amos.

Habel then moved to Fauquier, Ontario, serving as reeve of the township of Shackleton and Machin and living there until 1943, when he moved to Kapuskasing.

In 1934, he was elected to the Legislative Assembly of Ontario for the riding of Cochrane North. An Ontario Liberal, he was re-elected in 1937 and 1945.

In 1953, he was elected to the House of Commons of Canada for the riding of Cochrane. A Liberal, he was re-elected in 1957, 1958, 1962, 1963, and 1965. From 1958 to 1963, he was the Chief Opposition Whip.

He married Estelle Belleau in 1921 and they had two children: Madeleine and Jean Paul.

Political offices
| Preceded by Pierre Gauthier | Chief Opposition Whip; 1958–1964 | Succeeded by Eric Alfred Winkler |
