= Ralph Stewart =

Ralph Stewart may refer to:

- Ralph Stewart (ice hockey) (born 1948), ice hockey player
- Ralph Stewart (Canadian politician) (1929–2004), Canadian politician, member of the House of Commons
- Ralph Randles Stewart (1890–1993), botanist
- Ralph Stewart (American football) (1925–2016), American football player and coach
