= Robert G. Eaton =

Canadian politician

Bob Eaton

Ontario MPP
- In office 1975–1985
- Preceded by: New riding
- Succeeded by: Doug Reycraft
- Constituency: Middlesex
- In office 1971–1975
- Preceded by: Kenneth Bolton
- Succeeded by: Riding abolished
- Constituency: Middlesex South

Personal details
- Born: June 23, 1937 Woodstock, Ontario
- Died: January 7, 2009 (aged 71) London, Ontario
- Party: Progressive Conservative
- Profession: Farmer

Robert Gordon Eaton (June 23, 1937 – January 7, 2009) was a politician in Ontario, Canada. He was a Progressive Conservative member in the Legislative Assembly of Ontario from 1971 to 1985, and was a cabinet minister in the government of William Davis.

== Background ==
He was born in Woodstock, Ontario, and educated at the Ridgetown College of Agricultural Technology. He was a member of his local school board from 1964 to 1966, and a director of Missouri Mutual Fire Insurance.

== Politics ==
Eaton was elected to the Ontario legislature in the 1971 provincial election, defeating New Democratic Party MPP Kenneth Bolton by 3,053 votes in Middlesex South. He was re-elected for the redistributed seat of Middlesex in 1975, 1977 and 1981. He was appointed to Davis's cabinet as a minister without portfolio on February 13, 1982. He was appointed to the additional position of Chief Government Whip on July 6, 1983. He supported Dennis Timbrell to succeed Davis as party leader in January 1985, and was dropped from cabinet when Frank Miller became Premier of Ontario on February 8, 1985.

The Conservatives suffered an electoral setback in the 1985 election under Miller's leadership. Eaton was personally defeated, losing to Liberal candidate Doug Reycraft by 810 votes.

=== Cabinet positions ===
Davis ministry, Province of Ontario (1971–1985)
Sub-Cabinet Post
Predecessor	Title	Successor
	Minister without portfolio (1982-1985)	
Special Parliamentary Responsibilities
Predecessor	Title	Successor
Bud Gregory	Chief Government Whip; 1983-1985	Alan Robinson

== Later life ==
After leaving politics, he continued his farm operation, specializing in Hereford cattle, and launched his a real estate company, Royal LePage Landco Realty, with agents in Woodstock, Ingersoll, London and St. Thomas. Eaton served as the President of Woodstock and Ingersoll Real Estate Board. During his last years, Eaton was an advocate for cancer patients, pushing for cancer drug coverage under OHIP. Eaton died in January 2009, after a battle with cancer. He was 71 years old.
