= Brigitte Belton =

Canadian truck driver and protester

Brigitte Belton is a Canadian truck driver who started the 2022 Canada convoy protest (initially organized to oppose COVID-19 vaccine mandates for cross-border truck drivers).

== Personal life ==
Belton is from Wallaceburg, Ontario. She is not vaccinated for COVID-19. She is married, and is both a mother and a grandmother.

Originally an Ontario Party's candidate in 2022, Belton now supports the New Blue Party of Ontario, both minor right-wing populist political parties.

== Activism ==
On 16 November 2021 Canadian Border Services Agency officers refused Belton entry to Canada at the Detroit–Windsor Tunnel due to her failure to wear a face mask.

In May 2022, Belton was selected as the Ontario Party's candidate for the Elgin-Middlesex-London riding. She won 1,092 votes, representing 2.49% of the votes cast, losing to Rob Flack.

At the October 2022 Public Order Emergency Commission, commission lawyer Stephen Armstrong stated Belton vented her frustration via her TikTok feed before using the platform to connect with Chris Barber and then later initiating the planning of the Canada convoy protest. Armstrong said that Belton, Chris Barber, and James Bauder all took part in a Facebook Live event on 13 January 2022, to plan the protest's route and logistics. The next day, Tamara Lich started the fundraiser for the protest.

Belton stated the mainstream media did not depict the protesters accurately. She stated she is not against vaccinations, but is against vaccination mandates, as she believes people should be able to make this health choice for themselves. She questioned the safety and effectiveness of the COVID-19 vaccinations.

Belton was one of the first witnesses to testify at the Public Order Emergency Commission. During her testimony she questioned how fellow protest leader Lich would spend money raised to support the convoy protest, and was critical of a decision to buy a decommissioned church in Ottawa. In July 2022, Belton's social media connected Lich to the pending purchase of Saint Brigid's Church in Ottawa, which was being occupied by The United People of Canada.

== Electoral history ==
2022 Ontario general election: Elgin—Middlesex—London
Party	Candidate	Votes	%	±%	Expenditures
Progressive Conservative	Rob Flack	22,369	51.08	–4.38	$91,316
New Democratic	Andy Kroeker	7,973	18.21	–13.86	$40,974
Liberal	Heather Jackson	7,618	17.40	+10.09	$24,316
New Blue	Matt Millar	2,238	5.11	–	$11,355
Green	Amanda Stark	2,043	4.67	+0.82	$3,085
Ontario Party	Brigitte Belton	1,092	2.49	–	$7,006
Freedom	Dave Plumb	261	0.60	+0.07	$0
Consensus Ontario	Malichi Malé	197	0.45	–	$0
Total valid votes/expense limit		43,791	99.46	–	$137,656
Total rejected, unmarked and declined ballots		236	0.54	–0.45	
Turnout		44,027	44.78	–14.68	
Eligible voters		98,326			
Progressive Conservative hold		Swing		▲4.74	
Source: Elections Ontario

== See also ==
- Pat King (activist), b. 1977
