= Albert Victor Waters =

Canadian politician

Albert Waters

Ontario MPP
- In office 1926–1934
- Preceded by: New riding
- Succeeded by: Joseph-Anaclet Habel
- Constituency: Cochrane North

Personal details
- Born: May 10, 1896 Toronto, Ontario
- Died: May 4, 1953 (aged 56) Cochrane, Ontario
- Party: Conservative
- Spouse: Florence Grace Hall (m. 1922)
- Occupation: Lawyer

Albert Victor Waters (May 10, 1896 – May 4, 1953) was a lawyer and political figure in Ontario. He represented Cochrane in the Legislative Assembly of Ontario from 1926 to 1934 as a Conservative member.

He was born in Toronto in 1896, the son of Alfred William Waters and Adda Grannard. Waters was educated in Toronto and at Osgoode Hall. In 1922, he married Florence Grace Hall. He served as a second lieutenant in the Royal Air Force in 1918. He died after an illness of three weeks in 1953.
