= Kenneth Bolton =

Canadian politician (1906–1996)

Ontario MPP
- In office 1969–1971
- Preceded by: Neil Olde
- Succeeded by: Bob Eaton
- Constituency: Middlesex South

Personal details
- Born: August 18, 1906 Birmingham, England
- Died: May 1, 1996 (aged 89) Vancouver, British Columbia
- Party: New Democrat
- Spouse: Lucy
- Children: 5
- Profession: Priest

Kenneth Charles Bolton (August 18, 1906– May 1, 1996) was a politician in Ontario, Canada. He was a New Democratic member of the Legislative Assembly of Ontario from 1969 to 1971 representing the riding of Middlesex South. Other than his two years as MPP, he was an Anglican priest and archdeacon serving in Ontario and British Columbia.

== Background ==
Born in Birmingham, England, Bolton immigrated to Canada and settled in Winnipeg in 1925. He studied arts and theology at St. John's College, where he studied for the ministry and was ordained an Anglican priest in 1932. He served as a minister throughout Canada and was later chaplain of Huron University College and associate professor of pastoral theology at the University of Western Ontario as well as Archdeacon of Bishop Cronyn Memorial Anglican Church in London, Ontario. He married Lucy Mary Margaret Cheyne December 1936. Together they raise 5 children, Robin, Margaret, David, Ken and Patricia.

Bolton was active in social justice causes with groups such as Oxfam and Amnesty International.

== Politics ==
He was elected to the legislature in a 1969 by-election. The victory was a surprise coming in an area where the NDP did not traditionally win seats. His campaign was a struggle which was complicated because of traffic accident three month before the by-election in which he broke several bones. His victory was credited to campaigning on the issue of Medicare at a time when the Progressive Conservative government of John Robarts was reluctant to join the plan. His victory is credited with helping to pressure the government to agree to bring the province into the plan.

As an MPP he was correctional services critic. He was defeated in the 1971 general election by Robert G. Eaton after serving in office for two years.

His son, Kenneth, ran for the NDP in the 2008 federal election in the riding of Yukon. He finished fourth.

== Later life ==
In 1971, he became a missionary in the Windward Islands in the West Indies. He also served for a short time in 1975 as acting secretary of the Primate's World Relief and Development Fund.

Later, he assisted at St. Martin-in-the-Fields Anglican Church in London, Ontario before moving to British Columbia in 1995 to be closer to his children. He died of heart failure during a flight from London, England to Vancouver, BC.
