= Daniel McIntyre (politician) =

Canadian politician from Ontario

Member of the Ontario Provincial Parliament for Middlesex South
- In office August 4, 1943 – March 24, 1945
- Preceded by: Charles Maitland MacFie
- Succeeded by: Harry Allen

Personal details
- Party: Progressive Conservative

Daniel McIntyre was a Canadian politician who was Progressive Conservative MPP for Middlesex South from 1943 to 1945.

== See also ==
- 21st Parliament of Ontario
