= Middlesex South (provincial electoral district) =

Ontario electoral district

Defunct provincial electoral district
- Legislature: Legislative Assembly of Ontario
- District created: 1934
- District abolished: 1973
- First contested: 1934
- Last contested: 1971

Middlesex South was a provincial riding in Ontario, Canada, that was created for the 1934 election. It was abolished prior to the 1975 election. It was redistributed into the ridings of Middlesex, Huron—Middlesex and London South.

== Members of Provincial Parliament ==
Middlesex South
Assembly	Years	Member	Party
Renamed from Middlesex West
19th	1934–1937	Charles Maitland MacFie (Note: In 1938, the title of Member of the Legislative Assembly was officially changed to Member of Provincial Parliament. Previously, it was unofficially used in the media and in the Legislature.)	Liberal
20th	1937–1943	Charles Maitland MacFie	Liberal
21st	1943–1945	Daniel McIntyre	Progressive Conservative
22nd	1945–1948	Harry Marshall Allen	Progressive Conservative
23rd	1948–1951	Harry Marshall Allen	Progressive Conservative
24th	1951–1955	Harry Marshall Allen	Progressive Conservative
25th	1955–1959	Harry Marshall Allen	Progressive Conservative
26th	1959–1963	Harry Marshall Allen	Progressive Conservative
27th	1963–1967	Neil Leverne Olde	Progressive Conservative
28th	1967–1969	Neil Leverne Olde	Progressive Conservative
28th	1969–1971	Kenneth Bolton	New Democratic
29th	1971–1975	Robert G. Eaton	Progressive Conservative
Sourced from the Ontario Legislative Assembly
Redistributed into Middlesex, Huron—Middlesex and London South before 1975 election

== Election results ==
1971 Ontario general election
Party	Candidate	Votes	%	±%
Progressive Conservative	Robert G. Eaton	12,253	42.85	+11.49
New Democratic	Kenneth Bolton	9,200	32.18	–5.60
Liberal	Ron Crawford	7,140	24.97	–5.89
Total valid votes		28,593	99.57	
Total rejected ballots		123	0.43	–0.26
Turnout		28,716	77.14	+8.91
Eligible voters		37,227		
Progressive Conservative gain from New Democratic		Swing		+8.55
Source: Elections Ontario

Ontario provincial by-election, September 18, 1969 Death of Neil Leverne Olde
Party	Candidate	Votes	%	±%
New Democratic	Kenneth Bolton	8,194	37.78	+13.21
Progressive Conservative	Walden Allen	6,802	31.36	–13.11
Liberal	David McDonald	6,694	30.86	–0.10
Total valid votes		21,690	99.31	
Total rejected ballots		150	0.69	+0.02
Turnout		21,840	68.22	+5.04
Eligible voters		32,012		
New Democratic gain from Progressive Conservative		Swing		+6.65
Source: Elections Ontario

1967 Ontario general election
Party	Candidate	Votes	%	±%
Progressive Conservative	Neil Leverne Olde	8,423	44.47	–16.26
Liberal	Leo Gent	5,865	30.96	–1.13
New Democratic	Kenneth Bolton	4,654	24.57	+17.38
Total valid votes		18,942	99.33	
Total rejected ballots		128	0.67	–0.25
Turnout		19,070	63.19	+0.62
Eligible voters		30,181		
Progressive Conservative hold		Swing		–7.56
Source: Elections Ontario

1963 Ontario general election
Party	Candidate	Votes	%	±%
Progressive Conservative	Neil Leverne Olde	12,532	60.72	+4.74
Liberal	Ronald Macfie	6,623	32.09	–5.12
New Democratic	Pat Chefurka	1,483	7.19	+0.38
Total valid votes		20,638	99.08	
Total rejected ballots		192	0.92	–0.84
Turnout		20,830	62.57	+3.12
Eligible voters		33,291		
Progressive Conservative hold		Swing		+4.93
Source: Elections Ontario

1959 Ontario general election
Party	Candidate	Votes	%	±%
Progressive Conservative	Harry Allen	9,317	55.98	–0.73
Liberal	Ronald Macfie	6,193	37.21	–6.07
Co-operative Commonwealth	Everett Orlan Hall	1,132	6.80	–
Total valid votes		16,642	98.24	
Total rejected ballots		299	1.76	+0.60
Turnout		16,941	59.45	–8.20
Eligible voters		28,498		
Progressive Conservative hold		Swing		+2.67
Source: Elections Ontario

1955 Ontario general election
Party	Candidate	Votes	%	±%
Progressive Conservative	Harry Allen	9,434	56.72	–1.55
Liberal	Harvey G. Wales	7,199	43.28	+7.90
Total valid votes		16,633	98.84	
Total rejected ballots		196	1.16	+0.51
Turnout		16,829	67.64	+2.44
Eligible voters		24,879		
Progressive Conservative hold		Swing		–4.73
Source: Elections Ontario

1951 Ontario general election
Party	Candidate	Votes	%	±%
Progressive Conservative	Harry Allen	8,461	58.27	+7.53
Liberal	Harry B. Brodie	5,137	35.38	–5.06
Co-operative Commonwealth	Anne Vowles	922	6.35	–2.47
Total valid votes		14,520	99.34	
Total rejected ballots		96	0.66	+0.18
Turnout		14,616	65.20	–2.86
Eligible voters		22,416		
Progressive Conservative hold		Swing		+6.29
Source: Elections Ontario

1948 Ontario general election
Party	Candidate	Votes	%	±%
Progressive Conservative	Harry Allen	6,957	50.74	+6.18
Liberal	Neil P. McGugan	5,544	40.44	–3.17
Co-operative Commonwealth	Anne Vowles	1,209	8.82	–3.01
Total valid votes		13,710	99.52	
Total rejected ballots		66	0.48	–0.10
Turnout		13,776	68.06	–2.24
Eligible voters		20,241		
Progressive Conservative hold		Swing		+4.67
Source: Elections Ontario

1945 Ontario general election
Party	Candidate	Votes	%	±%
Progressive Conservative	Harry Allen	6,251	44.57	–3.56
Liberal	J. Frank Gerry	6,116	43.60	+4.94
Co-operative Commonwealth	Fred McGill	1,659	11.83	–1.38
Total valid votes		14,026	99.42	
Total rejected ballots		82	0.58	+0.15
Turnout		14,108	70.30	+12.98
Eligible voters		20,067		
Progressive Conservative hold		Swing		–4.25
Source: Elections Ontario

1943 Ontario general election
Party	Candidate	Votes	%	±%
Progressive Conservative	Daniel McIntyre	5,313	48.13	+15.35
Liberal	Charles Maitland MacFie	4,269	38.67	–28.56
Co-operative Commonwealth	J. Harry Finch	1,458	13.21	–
Total valid votes		11,040	99.57	
Total rejected ballots		48	0.43	–0.28
Turnout		11,088	57.33	–9.72
Eligible voters		19,342		
Progressive Conservative gain from Liberal		Swing		+21.95
Source: Elections Ontario

1937 Ontario general election
Party	Candidate	Votes	%	±%
Liberal	Charles Maitland MacFie	8,370	67.22	+6.90
Conservative	Alex D. McRae	4,081	32.78	–6.90
Total valid votes		12,451	99.29	
Total rejected ballots		89	0.71	+0.03
Turnout		12,540	67.04	–6.29
Eligible voters		18,704		
Liberal hold		Swing		+6.90
Source: Elections Ontario

1934 Ontario general election
Party	Candidate	Votes	%
Liberal	Charles Maitland MacFie	8,239	60.33
Conservative	Lloyd William Morgan Freele	5,418	39.67
Total valid votes		13,657	99.32
Total rejected ballots		94	0.68
Turnout		13,751	73.33
Eligible voters		18,751	
Liberal pickup new district.			
Source: Elections Ontario
