= Elgin—Middlesex—London (provincial electoral district) =

Provincial electoral district in Ontario, Canada

Coordinates: 42.77°N 81.20°W

Ontario electoral district
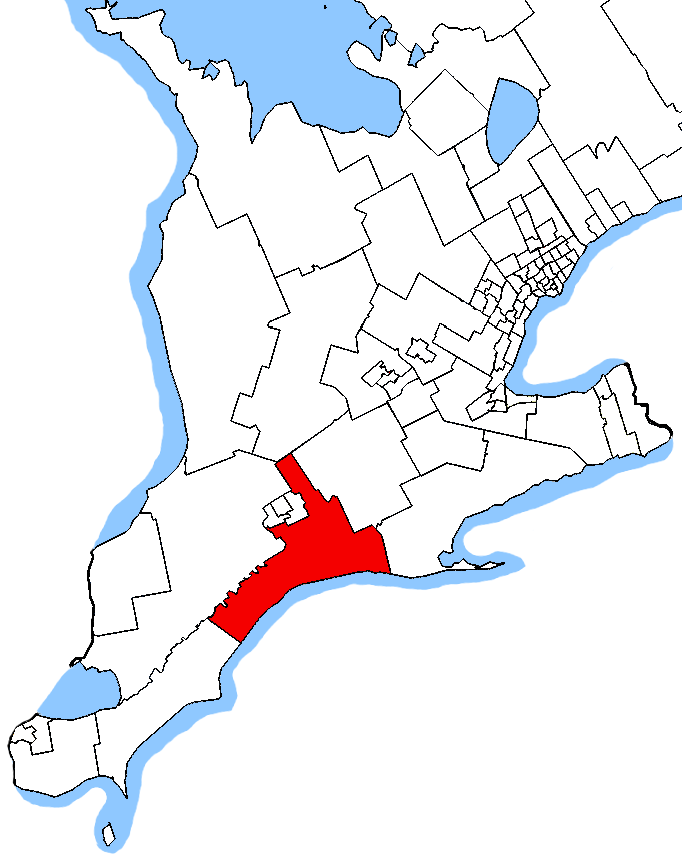
- Elgin—Middlesex—London in relation to other Southwestern Ontario electoral districts

Provincial electoral district
- Legislature: Legislative Assembly of Ontario
MPP
Rob Flack
Progressive Conservative
- District created: 1996
- First contested: 1999
- Last contested: 2025

Demographics
- Population (2016): 115,055
- Electors (2018): 89,636
- Area (km²): 3,521
- Pop. density (per km²): 32.7
- Census division(s): Middlesex County, Elgin County
- Census subdivision(s): London, North Dorchester, Thames Centre, St. Thomas, Central Elgin, Malahide, Aylmer, Bayham, West Elgin, Southwold, Dutton/Dunwich

Elgin—Middlesex—London is a provincial electoral district in southwestern Ontario, Canada. It elects one member to the Legislative Assembly of Ontario.

It was created in 1999 from all of Elgin and parts of Middlesex and London South.

When the riding was created, it included all of Elgin County plus the townships of Delaware and North Dorchester, and that part of London south of a line following Dingman Creek to Southdale Road to White Oak Road to Exeter Road to Meg Drive to Jalna Boulevard to Ernest Avenue to Bradley Avenue to the Wenige Expressway to Arran Place to Bradley Avenue.

In 2007, it lost Delaware Township but gained all of Thames Centre.

== Members ==
Elgin—Middlesex—London
| Assembly | Years | Member | Party |
|---|---|---|---|
Riding created from Elgin, Middlesex and London South
| 37th | 1999–2003 | Steve Peters | Liberal |
| 38th | 2003–2007 | Steve Peters | Liberal |
| 39th | 2007–2011 | Steve Peters | Liberal |
| 40th | 2011–2014 | Jeff Yurek | Progressive Conservative |
| 41st | 2014–2018 | Jeff Yurek | Progressive Conservative |
| 42nd | 2018–2022 | Jeff Yurek | Progressive Conservative |
| 43rd | 2022–2025 | Rob Flack | Progressive Conservative |
| 44th | 2025–present | Rob Flack | Progressive Conservative |

== Election results ==
Winning party in each polling division of Elgin—Middlesex—London at the 2025 Ontario general election

2025 Ontario general election
| Party | Candidate | Votes | % | ±% | Expenditures |
|---|---|---|---|---|---|
| Progressive Conservative | Rob Flack | 28,720 | 55.78 | +4.70 | $87,771 |
| Liberal | Douglas MacTavish | 12,598 | 24.47 | +7.07 | $10,429 |
| New Democratic | Amanda Zavitz | 4,738 | 9.20 | –9.00 | $11,328 |
| Green | Amanda Stark | 2,933 | 5.70 | +1.03 | $6,448 |
| New Blue | Brian Figueiredo | 1,418 | 2.75 | –2.36 | $4,821 |
| Ontario Party | Cooper Labrie | 610 | 1.18 | –1.31 | $0 |
| None of the Above | Stephen R. Campbell | 469 | 0.91 | – | $0 |
| Total valid votes/expense limit | | 51,486 | 99.06 | – | $169,676 |
| Total rejected, unmarked and declined ballots | | 487 | 0.94 | +0.40 | |
| Turnout | | 51,973 | 49.32 | +4.54 | |
| Eligible voters | | 105,389 | | | |
| Progressive Conservative hold | | Swing | | –1.19 | |
Source: Elections Ontario

Winning party in each polling division of Elgin—Middlesex—London at the 2022 Ontario general election

2022 Ontario general election
| Party | Candidate | Votes | % | ±% | Expenditures |
|---|---|---|---|---|---|
| Progressive Conservative | Rob Flack | 22,369 | 51.08 | –4.38 | $91,316 |
| New Democratic | Andy Kroeker | 7,973 | 18.21 | –13.86 | $40,974 |
| Liberal | Heather Jackson | 7,618 | 17.40 | +10.09 | $24,316 |
| New Blue | Matt Millar | 2,238 | 5.11 | – | $11,355 |
| Green | Amanda Stark | 2,043 | 4.67 | +0.82 | $3,085 |
| Ontario Party | Brigitte Belton | 1,092 | 2.49 | – | $7,006 |
| Freedom | Dave Plumb | 261 | 0.60 | +0.07 | $0 |
| Consensus Ontario | Malichi Malé | 197 | 0.45 | – | $0 |
| Total valid votes/expense limit | | 43,791 | 99.46 | – | $137,656 |
| Total rejected, unmarked and declined ballots | | 236 | 0.54 | –0.45 | |
| Turnout | | 44,027 | 44.78 | –14.68 | |
| Eligible voters | | 98,326 | | | |
| Progressive Conservative hold | | Swing | | +4.74 | |
Source: Elections Ontario

2018 Ontario general election
| Party | Candidate | Votes | % | ±% |
|---|---|---|---|---|
| Progressive Conservative | Jeff Yurek | 29,264 | 55.46 | +8.32 |
| New Democratic | Amanda Stratton | 16,923 | 32.07 | +5.84 |
| Liberal | Carlie Forsythe | 3,857 | 7.31 | –12.66 |
| Green | Bronagh Morgan | 2,029 | 3.85 | –1.08 |
| Libertarian | Richard Styve | 300 | 0.57 | – |
| Freedom | Dave Plumb | 278 | 0.53 | –1.20 |
| Objective Truth | Henri Barrette | 116 | 0.22 | – |
| Total valid votes | | 52,767 | 99.02 | |
| Total rejected, unmarked and declined ballots | | 524 | 0.98 | –0.50 |
| Turnout | | 53,291 | 59.45 | +5.47 |
| Eligible voters | | 89,636 | | |
| Progressive Conservative hold | | Swing | | +1.24 |
Source: Elections Ontario

2014 general election redistributed results
| Party | Vote | % |
|---|---|---|
| Progressive Conservative | 20,649 | 47.14 |
| New Democratic | 11,489 | 26.23 |
| Liberal | 8,748 | 19.97 |
| Green | 755 | 1.72 |
| Freedom | 755 | 1.72 |

2014 Ontario general election
| Party | Candidate | Votes | % | ±% |
|---|---|---|---|---|
| Progressive Conservative | Jeff Yurek | 20,946 | 46.36 | –1.50 |
| New Democratic | Kathy Cornish | 12,034 | 26.63 | +4.36 |
| Liberal | Serge Lavoie | 9,183 | 20.32 | –6.48 |
| Green | John Fisher | 2,236 | 4.95 | +2.57 |
| Freedom | Clare Maloney | 784 | 1.74 | +1.05 |
| Total valid votes | | 45,183 | 98.51 | |
| Total rejected, unmarked and declined ballots | | 682 | 1.49 | +1.12 |
| Turnout | | 45,865 | 53.98 | +2.70 |
| Eligible voters | | 84,970 | | |
| Progressive Conservative hold | | Swing | | –2.93 |
Source: Elections Ontario

2011 Ontario general election
| Party | Candidate | Votes | % | ±% |
|---|---|---|---|---|
| Progressive Conservative | Jeff Yurek | 19,771 | 47.86 | +17.40 |
| Liberal | Lori Baldwin-Sands | 11,075 | 26.81 | –22.29 |
| New Democratic | Kathy Cornish | 9,201 | 22.27 | +10.92 |
| Green | Eric Loewen | 981 | 2.37 | –5.85 |
| Freedom | Paul McKeever | 283 | 0.69 | –0.18 |
| Total valid votes | | 41,311 | 99.63 | |
| Total rejected, unmarked and declined ballots | | 154 | 0.37 | –0.35 |
| Turnout | | 41,465 | 51.28 | –1.81 |
| Eligible voters | | 80,858 | | |
| Progressive Conservative gain from Liberal | | Swing | | +19.85 |
Source: Elections Ontario

2007 Ontario general election
| Party | Candidate | Votes | % | ±% |
|---|---|---|---|---|
| Liberal | Steve Peters | 20,085 | 49.10 | –8.21 |
| Progressive Conservative | Bill Fehr | 12,460 | 30.46 | +0.21 |
| New Democratic | Brad James | 4,643 | 11.35 | +2.00 |
| Green | Devin Kelly | 3,363 | 8.22 | +6.67 |
| Freedom | George (Ray) Monteith | 353 | 0.86 | –0.68 |
| Total valid votes | | 40,904 | 99.27 | |
| Total rejected, unmarked and declined ballots | | 299 | 0.73 | +0.17 |
| Turnout | | 41,203 | 53.09 | –7.23 |
| Eligible voters | | 77,606 | | |
| Liberal hold | | Swing | | –4.21 |
Source: Elections Ontario

2003 Ontario general election
| Party | Candidate | Votes | % | ±% |
|---|---|---|---|---|
| Liberal | Steve Peters | 24,914 | 57.31 | +11.12 |
| Progressive Conservative | Bruce Smith | 13,149 | 30.25 | –13.30 |
| New Democratic | Bryan K. Bakker | 4,063 | 9.35 | +1.53 |
| Green | John R. Fisher | 673 | 1.55 | +0.66 |
| Freedom | George (Ray) Monteith | 671 | 1.54 | +0.63 |
| Total valid votes | | 43,470 | 99.44 | |
| Total rejected, unmarked and declined ballots | | 245 | 0.56 | –0.25 |
| Turnout | | 43,715 | 60.32 | –1.41 |
| Eligible voters | | 72,468 | | |
| Liberal hold | | Swing | | +12.21 |
Source: Elections Ontario

1999 Ontario general election
| Party | Candidate | Votes | % |
|---|---|---|---|
| Liberal | Steve Peters | 20,417 | 46.19 |
| Progressive Conservative | Bruce Smith | 19,246 | 43.54 |
| New Democratic | Dave La Pointe | 3,455 | 7.82 |
| Freedom | George (Ray) Monteith | 405 | 0.92 |
| Green | John R. Fisher | 391 | 0.88 |
| Independent | Corey Janzen | 284 | 0.64 |
| Total valid votes | | 44,198 | 99.19 |
| Total rejected, unmarked and declined ballots | | 359 | 0.81 |
| Turnout | | 44,557 | 61.73 |
| Eligible voters | | 72,175 | |
| Liberal pickup new district. | | | |
Source: Elections Ontario

== 2007 electoral reform referendum ==
2007 Ontario electoral reform referendum
| Side | Votes | % |
|---|---|---|
| First Past the Post | 26,918 | 68.0 |
| Mixed member proportional | 12,695 | 32.0 |
| Total valid votes | 39,613 | 100.0 |

== See also ==
- List of Ontario provincial electoral districts
- Canadian provincial electoral districts
