= Middlesex (provincial electoral district) =

Ontario electoral district

Defunct provincial electoral district
- Legislature: Legislative Assembly of Ontario
- District created: 1975
- District abolished: 1996
- First contested: 1975
- Last contested: 1995

Middlesex was a provincial riding in Ontario, Canada, that was created for the 1975 election. It was abolished prior to the 1999 election. It was redistributed into the ridings of Elgin—Middlesex—London, Lambton—Kent—Middlesex, London—Fanshawe, London North Centre, London West and Perth—Middlesex.

== Boundaries ==
In 1975, the boundaries of the riding included the townships of Caradoc, Delaware, Ekrid, Lobo, London, Metcalfe, Mosa, North Dorchester, Westminster and West Nissouri. It also included the town of Strathroy and the villages of Glencoe, Newbury and Wardsville.

In 1986, the boundaries were changed as follows: it was realigned to include Indian reserves No. 41 and 42 and most of the county of Middlesex except for part of the city of London that lay west of Highbury Road, Huron Street, and Clarke Road.

In 1996, the provincial government reduced the number of ridings in the province from 130 to 103. They also directed the new ridings to correspond to the boundaries of the existing federal ridings. 18% of the riding was redistributed into Elgin—Middlesex—London, 34% to Lambton—Kent—Middlesex, 21% to London—Fanshawe, 1% to London North Centre, a negligible amount to London West and 25% to Perth—Middlesex.

== Members of Provincial Parliament ==
Middlesex
Assembly	Years	Member	Party
Created in 1975 from Middlesex North and Middlesex South
30th	1975–1977	Robert G. Eaton	Progressive Conservative
31st	1977–1981	Robert G. Eaton	Progressive Conservative
32nd	1981–1985	Robert G. Eaton	Progressive Conservative
33rd	1985–1987	Doug Reycraft	Liberal
34th	1987–1990	Doug Reycraft	Liberal
35th	1990–1995	Irene Mathyssen	New Democratic
36th	1995–1999	Bruce Smith	Progressive Conservative
Sourced from the Ontario Legislative Assembly
Redistributed into Elgin—Middlesex—London, Lambton—Kent—Middlesex, London—Fanshawe, London North Centre, London West and Perth—Middlesex after 1999

== Election results ==
1995 Ontario general election
Party	Candidate	Votes	%	±%
Progressive Conservative	Bruce Smith	15,684	40.35	+17.01
Liberal	Doug Reycraft	10,448	26.88	–4.39
New Democratic	Irene Mathyssen	8,799	22.64	–9.99
Family Coalition	Jamie Harris	3,481	8.96	–1.48
Freedom	Barry Malcolm	458	1.18	–1.15
Total valid votes		38,870	99.12	
Total rejected, unmarked and declined ballots		345	0.88	–0.26
Turnout		39,215	64.67	–4.14
Eligible voters		60,643		
Progressive Conservative gain from New Democratic		Swing		+13.50
Source: Elections Ontario

1990 Ontario general election
Party	Candidate	Votes	%	±%
New Democratic	Irene Mathyssen	12,522	32.62	+15.89
Liberal	Doug Reycraft	12,002	31.27	–20.23
Progressive Conservative	Gordon Hardcastle	8,957	23.34	+0.84
Family Coalition	Bill Giesen	4,007	10.44	+2.64
Freedom	Barry Malcolm	894	2.33	+0.87
Total valid votes		38,382	98.86	
Total rejected, unmarked and declined ballots		442	1.14	+0.66
Turnout		38,824	68.80	+2.96
Eligible voters		56,427		
New Democratic gain from Liberal		Swing		+18.06
Source: Elections Ontario

1987 Ontario general election
Party	Candidate	Votes	%	±%
Liberal	Doug Reycraft	17,600	51.50	+4.34
Progressive Conservative	Renie Long	7,689	22.50	–21.28
New Democratic	Michael G. Wyatt	5,720	16.74	+7.68
Family Coalition	Bill Giesen	2,664	7.80	–
Freedom	Marc Emery	499	1.46	–
Total valid votes		34,172	99.52	
Total rejected ballots		164	0.48	+0.20
Turnout		34,336	65.84	–2.09
Eligible voters		52,150		
Liberal hold		Swing		+12.81
Source: Elections Ontario

1985 Ontario general election
Party	Candidate	Votes	%	±%
Liberal	Doug Reycraft	11,292	47.16	+9.75
Progressive Conservative	Robert G. Eaton	10,482	43.78	–9.06
New Democratic	Larry Ross Green	2,169	9.06	–0.70
Total valid votes		23,943	99.73	
Total rejected ballots		66	0.27	–0.10
Turnout		24,009	67.93	+2.03
Eligible voters		35,345		
Liberal gain from Progressive Conservative		Swing		+9.41
Source: Elections Ontario

1981 Ontario general election
Party	Candidate	Votes	%	±%
Progressive Conservative	Robert G. Eaton	11,672	52.84	+9.95
Liberal	Bob Coulthard	8,264	37.41	+0.85
New Democratic	Larry Ross Green	2,155	9.76	–10.80
Total valid votes		22,091	99.63	
Total rejected ballots		83	0.37	+0.02
Turnout		22,174	65.90	–9.31
Eligible voters		33,649		
Progressive Conservative hold		Swing		+4.55
Source: Elections Ontario

1977 Ontario general election
Party	Candidate	Votes	%	±%
Progressive Conservative	Robert G. Eaton	10,427	42.88	–2.09
Liberal	Don Nisbet	8,889	36.56	–4.54
New Democratic	Gordon Hill	4,998	20.56	+6.63
Total valid votes		24,314	99.64	
Total rejected ballots		87	0.36	–0.10
Turnout		24,401	75.21	+2.95
Eligible voters		32,446		
Progressive Conservative hold		Swing		+1.23
Source: Elections Ontario

1975 Ontario general election
Party	Candidate	Votes	%
Progressive Conservative	Robert G. Eaton	10,092	44.97
Liberal	Maurice Platts	9,223	41.10
New Democratic	Howard Aitkenhead	3,125	13.93
Total valid votes		22,440	99.54
Total rejected ballots		103	0.46
Turnout		22,543	72.25
Eligible voters		31,201	
Progressive Conservative pickup new district.			
Source: Elections Ontario
