= Steve Peters (Ontario politician) =

Canadian politician (born 1963)

The Honourable Steve Peters ECO

40th Speaker of the Legislative Assembly of Ontario
- In office 2007–2011
- Preceded by: Michael A. Brown
- Succeeded by: Dave Levac

Ontario MPP
- In office 1999–2011
- Preceded by: New riding
- Succeeded by: Jeff Yurek
- Constituency: Elgin—Middlesex—London

Personal details
- Born: 19 January 1963 (age 63) St. Thomas, Ontario, Canada
- Party: Liberal
- Occupation: Archivist

Stephen J. "Steve" Peters (born 19 January 1963) is a former politician in Ontario, Canada, who served as a Liberal member of the Legislative Assembly of Ontario from 1999 to 2011. He served as a Speaker from 2007 to 2011 and was a Cabinet Minister in the government of Dalton McGuinty.

== Background ==
Peters was born in St. Thomas, in the southwestern section of Ontario. Both of his parents were the children of Ukrainian immigrants. He was educated at the University of Western Ontario, and received a Bachelor of Arts degree in history in 1985. Peters subsequently worked as an archivist at Victoria Hospital in London, Ontario, and at Alma College in St. Thomas. He also worked as a stock clerk at an A&P food store in St. Thomas.

== Politics ==
Peters began his political career at the municipal level, being elected to the St. Thomas city council in 1988. He became the city's mayor in 1991, and was the youngest mayor in the country at the time. Peters was re-elected by significant majorities in 1994 and 1997.

Peters ran as a candidate of the Ontario Liberal Party in the 1999 provincial election. He defeated incumbent Progressive Conservative (PC) MPP Bruce Smith in the riding of Elgin—Middlesex—London by 1,171 votes.

The election was won by the Progressive Conservatives, and Peters became the opposition critic for Disability issues on 26 June 1999. In September 2000, he was named opposition critic for Agriculture. For the next three years, most of his interventions in the legislature were focused on agricultural and rural issues.

Peters was easily re-elected in the 2003 provincial election, receiving over 57% of the vote. Bruce Smith, again running for the Progressive Conservatives, received just over 30%. The election was won by the Liberals and Peters was named Minister of Agriculture and Food on 23 October 2003. In late September 2004, he announced that the provincial government would provide $30 million to farmers affected by the BSE crisis, which had prevented Canadian beef from reaching the American market.

He was named as Ontario's Minister of Labour following a cabinet shuffle on 29 June 2005.

Though he was re-elected in the general election of October 2007, he was dropped from cabinet in a post-election cabinet shuffle. On 28 November 2007, he was elected by his fellow members as the Speaker of the Legislative Assembly on the fourth ballot, defeating Michael A. Brown, Ted Arnott, David Zimmer and Lorenzo Berardinetti.

On 9 November 2010, Peters announced that he would not be seeking re-election in the 2011 Ontario general election.

In 2013, he supported Gerrard Kennedy in his bid to become leader of the Liberal Party. The leadership race was won by Kathleen Wynne.

=== Cabinet positions ===
McGuinty ministry, Province of Ontario (2003–2013)
Cabinet posts (2)
Predecessor	Office	Successor
Chris Bentley	Minister of Labour; 2005–2007	Brad Duguid
Helen Johns	Minister of Agriculture and Food; 2003–2005	Leona Dombrowsky

== After politics ==
After leaving the legislature, Peters became executive director of the Alliance of Ontario Food Processors.

Peters was elected to St. Thomas City Council in 2018.
