= Joseph-Arthur Bradette =

Canadian politician

The Honourable Joseph-Arthur Bradette

Member of Parliament for Timiskaming North
- In office 1926–1935
- Preceded by: John Raymond O'Neill
- Succeeded by: riding dissolved

Member of Parliament for Cochrane
- In office 1935–1953
- Preceded by: first member
- Succeeded by: Joseph-Anaclet Habel

Canadian Senator from Ontario
- In office June 12, 1953 – September 12, 1961
- Appointed by: Louis St. Laurent

Personal details
- Born: October 16, 1886 Saint-Urbain, Quebec, Canada
- Died: September 12, 1961 (aged 74)
- Party: Liberal
- Occupation: Politician; farmer; merchant; lawyer

Joseph-Arthur Bradette (October 16, 1886 – September 12, 1961) was a Canadian politician, farmer and merchant. He was elected to the House of Commons of Canada in 1926 as a Member of the Liberal Party to represent the riding of Timiskaming North. He was re-elected in the elections of 1930, for the riding of Cochrane in 1935, 1940, 1945 and 1949. He lost in the election of 1925. He served as Deputy Speaker and Chairman of Committees of the Whole of the House of Commons between 1943 and 1945.

He was appointed to the senate on the advice of Prime Minister Louis St. Laurent in 1953 where he served until his death in 1961.
