= Charles Maitland MacFie =

Canadian politician

Ontario MPP
- In office 1934–1943
- Preceded by: New riding
- Succeeded by: Daniel McIntyre
- Constituency: Middlesex South

Personal details
- Born: November 12, 1872; Mosa township
- Died: July 1, 1961 (aged 88)
- Political party: Liberal
- Spouse: Annabel Boyd
- Occupation: Farmer

Charles Maitland MacFie (November 12, 1872 – 1961) was a farmer and politician in Ontario, Canada. He represented Middlesex South in the Legislative Assembly of Ontario from 1934 to 1943 as a Liberal.

The son of James Walker MacFie and Jane Ann McGregor (née Maitland), he was born on a farm in Mosa township and was educated in Appin, Glencoe, Chatham and at the Ontario Agricultural College. MacFie married Annabel Boyd. He served as reeve for four years.
