= Chief Government Whip (Ontario) =

Canadian provincial political role

The Chief Government Whip of Ontario is the member of the government responsible for ensuring that members of the governing party attend and vote in the provincial Legislature as the party leadership desires.

The current Chief Government Whip is Effie Triantafilopoulos of the Progressive Conservative Party of Ontario.

== List of whips ==
Name	Duration	Party
Bud Gregory#	1981-1983	Progressive Conservative
Robert G. Eaton#	1983–85	Progressive Conservative
Alan Robinson#	1985 (February–May)	Progressive Conservative
Robert C. Mitchell#	1985 (May–June)	Progressive Conservative
Joan Smith	1985–87	Liberal
Doug Reycraft	1987–89	Liberal
Joan Smith	1989–90	Liberal
Shirley Coppen#	1990–93	New Democratic
Fred Wilson#	1993–95	New Democratic
David Turnbull	1995–97 (as backbencher)	Progressive Conservative
David Turnbull#	1995–97 (as cabinet minister)	Progressive Conservative
Frank Klees#	1999–2001	Progressive Conservative
Gary Stewart#	2001–02	Progressive Conservative
John Baird#	2002	Progressive Conservative
Doug Galt#	2002–03	Progressive Conservative
Dave Levac	2003–07	Liberal
Mike Colle	2007-2010	Liberal
Jeff Leal	2011-2013	Liberal
Donna Cansfield	2013	Liberal
Kevin Flynn	2013-2014	Liberal
Bob Delaney	2014–2015	Liberal
Marie-France Lalonde	2015–2016	Liberal
Jim Bradley	2016–2018	Liberal
Bill Walker	2018-2018	Progressive Conservative
Lorne Coe	2018-2022	Progressive Conservative
Ross Romano	2022-2025	Progressive Conservative
Matthew Rae	2025-2026	Progressive Conservative
Effie Triantafilopoulos	2026-present	Progressive Conservative
# = member of Cabinet, (usually minister without portfolio).
