= Réginald Bélair =

Canadian politician (1949–2020)

Member of Parliament for Timmins-James Bay
- In office June 2, 1997 – June 28, 2004
- Preceded by: None (riding created)
- Succeeded by: Charlie Angus

Member of Parliament for Cochrane—Superior
- In office November 21, 1988 – June 2, 1997
- Preceded by: Keith Penner
- Succeeded by: None (riding dissolved)

Personal details
- Born: April 6, 1949; Hearst, Ontario, Canada
- Died: March 3, 2020 (aged 70); Kapuskasing, Ontario, Canada
- Political party: Liberal

Réginald Bélair (April 6, 1949 – March 3, 2020) was a Canadian politician.

Bélair was a Liberal member of the House of Commons of Canada from 1988 to 2004, representing the riding of Cochrane—Superior until 1997 and subsequently Timmins-James Bay. Bélair also worked as an administrator, a manager, and a political assistant. In the House of Commons, Bélair was a Deputy Chairman of Committees of the Whole, and was the Parliamentary Secretary to the Minister of Public Works (Public Works and Government Services) and the Parliamentary Secretary to the Minister of Supply and Services (Public Works and Government Services).

Bélair was born in Hearst, Ontario. He served as a municipal councillor in Kapuskasing for three years.

== Retirement ==
In the 2004 federal election, electoral redistribution put Bélair's home area of Kapuskasing outside of Timmins—James Bay and into the newly named riding of Algoma—Manitoulin—Kapuskasing, an extension of the Algoma—Manitoulin riding held by Liberal colleague Brent St. Denis. Bélair at first announced that he might seek the Liberal nomination in Algoma—Manitoulin—Kapuskasing, then announced his retirement instead.

He died from cancer at a hospital in Kapuskasing on March 3, 2020, at the age of seventy.
