= Neil Leverne Olde =

Canadian politician (1904–1969)

Ontario MPP
- In office 1963–1969
- Preceded by: Harry Marshall Allen
- Succeeded by: Kenneth Bolton
- Constituency: Middlesex South

Personal details
- Born: June 3, 1904 Metcalfe, Middlesex County, Ontario
- Died: February 12, 1969 (aged 64) London, Ontario
- Party: Progressive Conservative
- Spouse: Margaret Coombs
- Occupation: Businessowner

Neil Leverne Olde (June 3, 1904 – February 12, 1969) was a politician in Ontario, Canada. He was a Progressive Conservative member in the Legislative Assembly of Ontario from 1963 to 1969 representing the riding of Middlesex South in southwestern Ontario.

== Background ==
Olde was born in Metcalf, Middlesex County, Ontario, to Charles Olde and Minnie Galbraith. He was president of Melbourne Packing Co. Ltd. In 1926, he married Margaret Eleanor Coombs.

== Politics ==
He was a school trustee, councillor, and reeve in Caradoc Township.

He was elected in the general election in 1963 defeating his Liberal rival Ronald MacFie by more than 6,000 votes. He was re-elected in 1967. During his time in office, he served as a backbench supporter of the John Robarts government. He died in office during a lung operation which was necessitated due to previous treatment for cancer.
