= Irene Mathyssen =

Canadian politician (1951–2026)

The Honourable Irene Mathyssen ECO
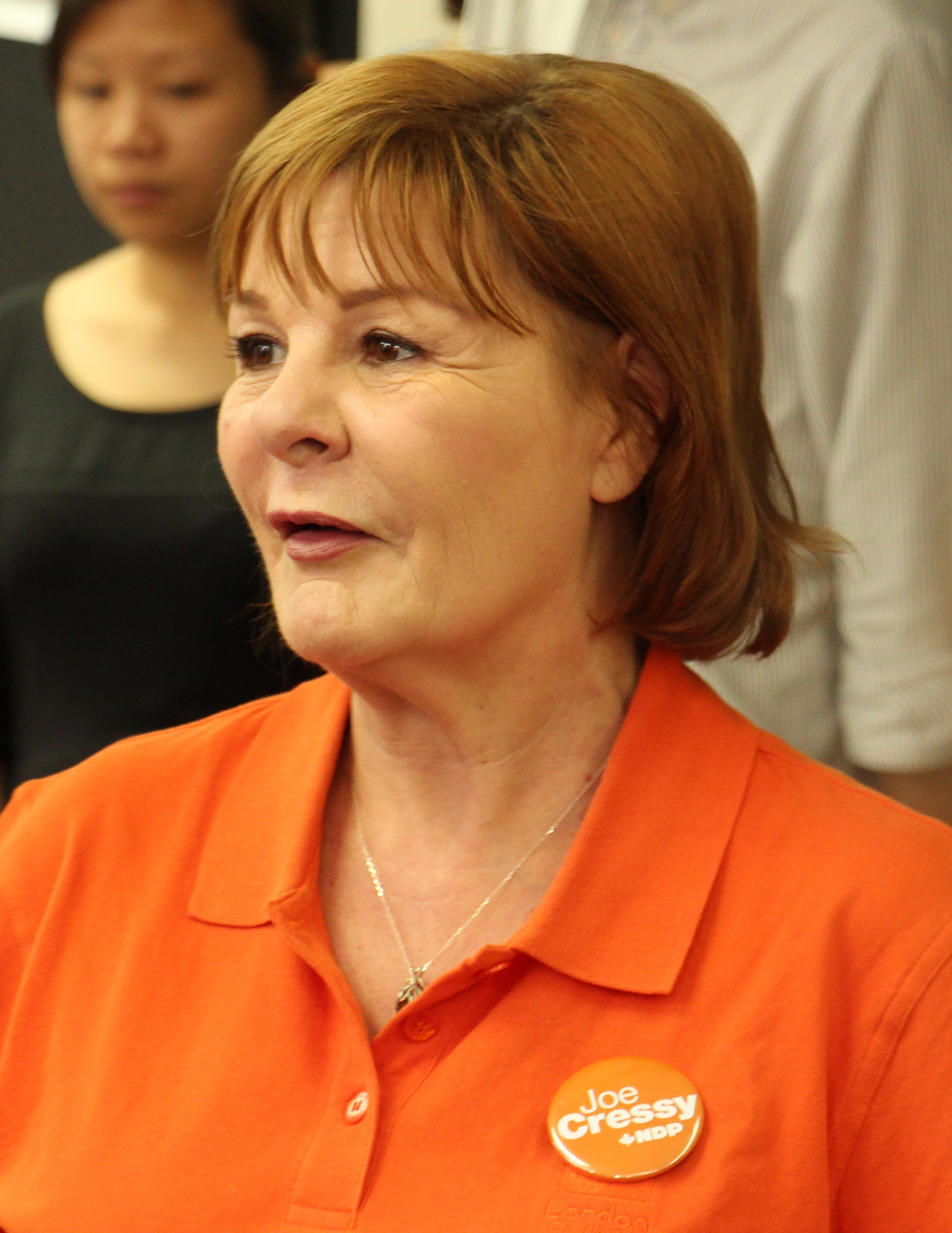
- Mathyssen in 2014

President of the Douglas-Coldwell Foundation
- In office September 13, 2022 – October 12, 2026
- Preceded by: Karl Belanger

Member of Parliament for London—Fanshawe
- In office January 23, 2006 – October 21, 2019
- Preceded by: Pat O'Brien
- Succeeded by: Lindsay Mathyssen

Chair of the Standing Committee on Status of Women
- In office November 15, 2011 – April 22, 2012
- Minister: Rona Ambrose
- Preceded by: Niki Ashton
- Succeeded by: Marie-Claude Morin

Member of the Ontario Provincial Parliament for Middlesex
- In office September 6, 1990 – June 7, 1995
- Preceded by: Doug Reycraft
- Succeeded by: Bruce Smith

Minister without portfolio
- In office October 21, 1994 – June 26, 1995
- Premier: Bob Rae

Personal details
- Born: August 16, 1951 London, Ontario, Canada
- Died: October 12, 2026 (aged 75) London, Ontario, Canada
- Party: New Democratic
- Other political affiliations: Ontario New Democratic
- Spouse: Keith Mathyssen
- Children: Lindsay Mathyssen
- Profession: Community activist; high school teacher

Irene R. Mathyssen (August 16, 1951 – October 12, 2026) was a Canadian politician who was the member of Parliament (MP) for London—Fanshawe from 2006 to 2019 and the Ontario member of Provincial Parliament (MPP) for Middlesex from 1990 to 1995. Mathyssen served as a minister without portfolio from 1994 to 1995 in Premier Bob Rae's government. She was a member of the New Democratic Party (NDP) and its provincial section in Ontario.

== Background ==
Mathyssen was educated at the University of Western Ontario from 1970 to 1975, receiving a Bachelor of Arts degree in English and Drama, and a Bachelor of Education degree. She taught English at Sir Frederick Banting Secondary School in London, Ontario, until 2006 except for a five-year break between 1990 and 1995 when she was an MPP. She served on the District 11 Ontario Secondary School Teachers' Federation Political Action Committee. She was a vocal opponent of the Invasion of Iraq in 2003 and participated in many local peace rallies. Mathyssen was a member of the Ontario Health Coalition. She was president of the Middlesex NDP riding association from 1989 to 1990.

== Provincial politics ==
Mathyssen was elected to represent the riding of Middlesex in the Legislative Assembly of Ontario in the 1990 provincial election, defeating incumbent Liberal Doug Reycraft by 520 votes (out of 38,382 cast). She served as a government Whip from 1990 to 1991, and was a parliamentary assistant to the Minister of the Environment from 1991 to 1994. In that capacity she announced that 6 million dollars would be spent on the cleanup of beaches in rural areas which were closed mostly due to agricultural runoff issues. In 1993, she voted against a government bill to allow a municipal expansion into her rural riding. During the debate she lamented about her lack of influence on the bill. She said, "There have been times when I felt utterly powerless in all of this. It's a strange feeling for one who came here with such high hopes."

On October 21, 1994, she was named a Minister without Portfolio, responsible for Culture, Tourism and Recreation.

The NDP was defeated by the Progressive Conservative Party in the 1995 provincial election, and Mathyssen was defeated in Middlesex, finishing third behind Reycraft and winner Progressive Conservative Bruce Smith.

She ran in the London—Fanshawe riding in the 1999 provincial election and placed third, behind PC candidate Frank Mazzilli and Liberal Peter Mancini. Mathyssen ran provincially in London—Fanshawe for a second time in the 2003 provincial election, and this time finished a strong second, losing to Liberal Khalil Ramal by fewer than 2,000 votes.

== Federal politics ==
Mathyssen ran for the federal New Democratic Party in the 1997 election, and finished third in the riding of London—Fanshawe, well behind Liberal incumbent Pat O'Brien. O'Brien won by more than 3,000 votes.

=== 2006: elected as MP ===
Mathyssen again ran in London—Fanshawe in the 2006 election. Pat O'Brien had left the Liberal Party by this time, and sat out his remaining time in the House of Commons as an independent. He opted not to run in the 2006 election. Mathyssen won the riding with 34% of the vote, becoming one of 29 New Democrats elected.

During the session, she was named as the NDP critic for Housing and for the Status of Women. In November 2006, she tabled a Private member's bill which she called the Housing Bill of Rights which would have provided secure housing for Canadians. The bill got no further than its first reading. A similar bill proposed by Libby Davies in 2004 also died on the order paper.

During a parliamentary session on December 5, 2007, Mathyssen committed a blunder when she stood in the Commons and accused Conservative James Moore of looking at images of "scantily clad" women on his personal laptop computer at his desk in the House of Commons. She openly questioned his integrity and said his actions "disrespected women". James Moore denied the allegations were true. Later in the day, Mathyssen and Moore spoke in person about the incident; Moore explained that the woman he had been looking at on his laptop computer screen was his girlfriend. Shortly after, Mathyssen retracted her statement and apologized to Moore.

=== 2008: re-elected ===
Mathyssen was re-elected as the Member of Parliament for London-Fanshawe in the 2008 federal election. In that election, she was the only incumbent in the London region re-elected with increased total vote (17,672) and percentage of popular vote (43.1%). In addition to retaining her role as Status of Women critic, Mathyssen was also named the NDP's deputy critic for public safety, and in this role, she has been an advocate for Canadian firefighters. She also served as the NDP's deputy critic for Veterans' Affairs.

In December 2010, Mathyssen introduced Bill C-601, which allowed any worker who had lost their job through no fault of their own to make a single lump sum payment over the maximum allowable investment into their Registered Retirement Savings Plan (RRSP) without financial penalty. It also ensured that workers would receive the maximum amount of Employment Insurance benefits for which they are eligible; workers would be able to collect EI immediately despite receiving severance pay.

=== 2011: re-elected ===
In the 2011 election, Mathyssen was re-elected with 50% of the popular vote, defeating Conservative candidate Jim Chahbar by over 7,000 votes. She was named the Official Opposition Critic for Seniors in the NDP’s shadow cabinet by Jack Layton. Despite the tradition of committee chairs going to government MPs, she served as chair of the House of Commons Committee on the Status of Women.

On January 1, 2012, Caterpillar Inc. locked out over 450 workers from the Electro Motive Diesel plant in Mathyssen’s riding of London-Fanshawe. Mathyssen was a vocal critic of the company’s actions and a strong supporter of the locked out workers. After the company announced it was closing the plant on February 3, Mathyssen put forward a motion in the House of Commons to amend the Investment Canada Act to prevent companies from taking these actions in the future.

In October 2013, Mathyssen introduced Bill C-282 to eliminate the HST on feminine hygiene products. The idea gained popular grassroots support, with a group called Canadian Menstruators organizing an online petition that rapidly attracted tens of thousands of signatures from across Canada. Mathyssen took the lead in the House of Commons for an NDP Opposition Day, introducing a motion to force a vote on the issue. The governing Conservatives initially tried to stall the effort promising to revisit the idea in the future, without a clear timeline. Mathyssen would not relent however, and with more than 74,000 Canadians having signed the petition, the Conservatives, with pressure mounting from their own female MPs threatening to not show up for the vote, changed course at the last moment. With the backing of MPs from all political parties in the House of Commons, Mathyssen's motion passed and the tax was eliminated on July 1, 2015.

=== 2015: re-elected ===
In October 2015, Mathyssen was re-elected for another term in parliament. Despite a strong "Stop Harper" campaign that led to increased voter turnout and sent a wave of popular support to Justin Trudeau's Liberals at the expense of the NDP, Mathyssen not only held her seat in London-Fanshawe, but retained almost all of the 20,000+ votes she received in 2011. NDP leader Tom Mulcair named Mathyssen the party's Critic for Veterans Affairs and the deputy whip for the caucus.

In August 2018, Mathyssen announced that she would be retiring from politics and would not seek re-election in the 2019 federal election.

== Death ==
Mathyssen died from cancer on October 12, 2026, at the age of 75.

== Electoral record ==
2015 Canadian federal election
Party	Candidate	Votes	%	±%	Expenditures
New Democratic	Irene Mathyssen	20,684	37.78	−12.06	$90,397.33
Liberal	Khalil Ramal	17,214	31.44	+19.41	$47,724.86
Conservative	Suzanna Dieleman	14,891	27.20	−6.72	$57,368.78
Green	Matthew Peloza	1,604	2.93	−0.05	$1,194.57
Independent	Ali Hamadi	352	0.64	–	$200.00
Total valid votes/Expense limit		54,745	99.49		$224,287.69
Total rejected ballots		283	0.51	–	
Turnout		55,028	63.03	–	
Eligible voters		87,298			
New Democratic hold		Swing		−15.74	
Source: Elections Canada

2011 Canadian federal election
Party	Candidate	Votes	%	±%	Expenditures
New Democratic	Irene Mathyssen	21,689	50.89	+7.83	–
Conservative	Jim Chahbar	14,294	33.55	+2.71	–
Liberal	Roger Caranci	4,893	11.48	−7.46	–
Green	Matthew Peloza	1,202	2.82	−3.65	–
Christian Heritage	G.J. Rancourt	535	1.26	+0.59	–
Total valid votes/Expense limit		42,613	100.00		
Total rejected ballots		236	0.55	+0.08	
Turnout		42,849	57.64	+2.53	
Eligible voters		74,338	–	–	

2008 Canadian federal election
Party	Candidate	Votes	%	±%	Expenditures
New Democratic	Irene Mathyssen	17,672	43.06	+8.56	$72,219
Conservative	Mary Lou Ambrogio	12,659	30.84	+1.82	$73,601
Liberal	Jacquie Gauthier	7,774	18.94	−13.70	$62,713
Green	Daniel O'Neail	2,656	6.47	+2.60	
Christian Heritage	Leonard Vanderhoeven	276	0.67	–	$568
Total valid votes/Expense limit		41,037	100.00	$82,792	
Rejected ballots		194	0.47	+.0.01	
Turnout		41,231	55.11	−7.12	

2006 Canadian federal election
Party	Candidate	Votes	%	±%
New Democratic	Irene Mathyssen	16,067	34.50	+4.1
Liberal	Glen Pearson	15,199	32.64	−5.5
Conservative	Dan Mailer	13,495	28.98	+2.7
Green	David McLaughlin	1,803	3.87	−0.1
Total valid votes		46,564	100.00	
Rejected ballots		215	0.46	
Turnout		46,779	62.23	

2004 Canadian federal election
Party	Candidate	Votes	%	±%
Liberal	Pat O'Brien	15,664	38.1	−16.7
New Democratic	Irene Mathyssen	12,511	30.4	+19.0
Conservative	John Mazzilli	10,811	26.3	−7.5
Green	Ed Moore	1,634	4.0	
Progressive Canadian	Derrall Bellaire	453	1.1	
Marxist–Leninist	Cameron Switzer	65	0.2	
Total valid votes		41,138	100.0	

2003 Ontario general election
Party	Candidate	Votes	%	±%
Liberal	Khalil Ramal	13,920	35.87	+0.83
New Democratic	Irene Mathyssen	12,051	31.05	+6.4
Progressive Conservative	Frank Mazzilli	11,777	30.35	-8.18
Green	Bryan Smith	568	1.46	+0.85
Freedom	Mike Davidson	493	1.27	+0.53
Total valid votes		38,809	100.0	

1999 Ontario general election
Party	Candidate	Votes	%
Progressive Conservative	Frank Mazzilli	15,295	38.53
Liberal	Peter Mancini	13,912	35.04
New Democratic	Irene Mathyssen	9,788	24.65
Freedom	Lloyd Walker	293	0.74
Green	Heidi Strasser	241	0.61
Natural Law	Wanda Beaver	172	0.43
Total valid votes		39,701	100.0

1997 Canadian federal election
Party	Candidate	Votes	%
Liberal	Pat O'Brien	20,497	51.2
Reform	Scott Bowman	6,838	17.1
New Democratic	Irene Mathyssen	6,754	16.9
Progressive Conservative	Daniel Thrasher	5,499	13.7
Green	Heidi Strasser	442	1.1
Total valid votes		40,030	100.0

1995 Ontario general election
Party	Candidate	Votes	%	±%
Progressive Conservative	Bruce Smith	15,684	40.35	+17.01
Liberal	Doug Reycraft	10,448	26.88	-4.39
New Democratic	Irene Mathyssen	8,799	22.64	-9.99
Family Coalition	Jamie Harris	3,481	8.96	-1.48
Freedom	Barry Malcolm	458	1.18	-1.15
Total valid votes		38,870	99.12	
Total rejected, unmarked and declined ballots		345	0.88	-0.26
Turnout		39,215	64.67	-4.14
Eligible voters		60,643		
Progressive Conservative gain from New Democratic		Swing		+13.50
Source: Elections Ontario

1990 Ontario general election
Party	Candidate	Votes	%	±%
New Democratic	Irene Mathyssen	12,522	32.62	+15.89
Liberal	Douglas Reycraft	12,022	31.27	-20.23
Progressive Conservative	Gordon Hardcastle	8,957	23.34	+0.84
Family Coalition	William Giesen	4,007	10.44	+2.64
Freedom	Barry Malcolm	894	2.33	+0.87
Total valid votes		38,382	98.86	
Total rejected, unmarked and declined ballots		442	1.14	+0.58
Turnout		38,824	68.80	+2.91
Eligible voters		56,426		
New Democratic gain from Liberal		Swing		+18.06
Source: Elections Ontario
