= Timiskaming North =

Former federal electoral district in Ontario, Canada

Ontario electoral district

Defunct federal electoral district
- Legislature: House of Commons
- District created: 1924
- District abolished: 1933
- First contested: 1925
- Last contested: 1930

Timiskaming North was a Canadian electoral district represented in the House of Commons of Canada for ten years, from 1925 to 1935. It was located in the northeastern part of the province of Ontario. It was created in 1924 from parts of Timiskaming and Algoma West ridings.

It consisted of the northern portion of Timiskaming District and much of the Algoma District

The electoral district was abolished in 1933 when it was redistributed between Timiskaming and Cochrane ridings.

== Members of Parliament ==
This riding has elected the following members of Parliament:

Parliament	Years	Member	Party
Riding created from Timiskaming and Algoma West
15th	1925–1926	John Raymond O'Neill	Conservative
16th	1926–1930	Joseph-Arthur Bradette	Liberal
17th	1930–1935	Joseph-Arthur Bradette	Liberal
Riding dissolved into Timiskaming and Cochrane

== Election history ==
1925 Canadian federal election: Timiskaming North
Party	Candidate	Votes	%	±%
Conservative	John Raymond O'Neill	6,053		
Liberal	Joseph-Arthur Bradette	5,560		
Liberal	Charles Vincent Gallagher	3,255		

1926 Canadian federal election: Timiskaming North
Party	Candidate	Votes	%	±%
Liberal	Joseph-Arthur Bradette	8,707		
Conservative	John Raymond O'Neill	7,553		

1930 Canadian federal election: Timiskaming North
Party	Candidate	Votes	%	±%
Liberal	Joseph-Arthur Bradette	9,586		
Conservative	David Alexandre Chenier	7,022		

== See also ==
- List of Canadian electoral districts
- Historical federal electoral districts of Canada
