= Rob Flack =

Canadian politician

The Honourable Rob Flack ECO MPP
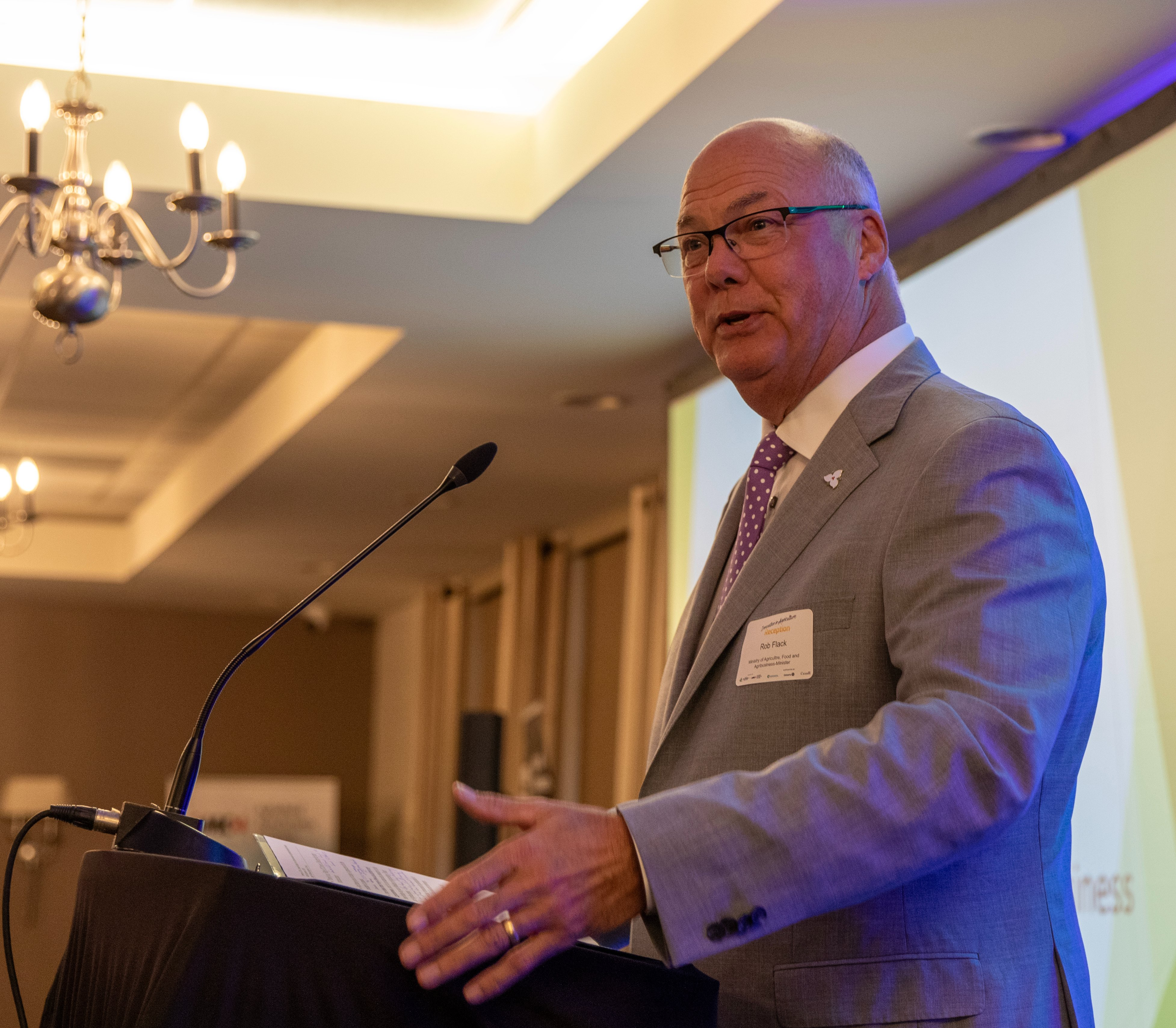

Minister of Municipal Affairs and Housing
- Incumbent
- Assumed office March 19, 2025
- Preceded by: Paul Calandra

Minister of Agriculture, Food, and Agribusiness
- In office June 11, 2024 – March 19, 2025
- Premier: Doug Ford
- Succeeded by: Trevor Jones

Associate Minister of Housing
- In office September 4, 2023 – June 6, 2024
- Premier: Doug Ford
- Succeeded by: Vijay Thanigasalam

Parliamentary Assistant to the Minister of Agriculture, Food and Rural Affairs
- In office June 29, 2022 – September 4, 2023
- Premier: Doug Ford

Member of the Ontario Provincial Parliament for Elgin—Middlesex—London
- Incumbent
- Assumed office June 29, 2022
- Preceded by: Jeff Yurek

Personal details
- Born: June 26, 1958 (age 67) Guelph, Ontario
- Party: Progressive Conservative
- Spouse: Denise Flack
- Children: 1
- Profession: Businessman, politician, farmer

Robert James Flack MPP (born June 26, 1958) is a Canadian politician, businessman, and farmer who currently serves as the Ontario Minister of Municipal Affairs and Housing. He represents the southwest Ontario riding of Elgin—Middlesex—London since his election in the 2022 provincial election. Before running for office, Flack was President and CEO of Masterfeeds, a Canadian national animal nutrition business.

== Parliamentary roles ==
- Member, Standing Committee on the Interior (August 10, 2022 – September 26, 2023).
- Associate Minister of Housing (September 4, 2023 – June 6, 2024)
- Minister of Agriculture, Food and Agribusiness (June 11, 2024 – March 19, 2025)
- Minister of Municipal Affairs and Housing (March 19, 2025 – present)

== Policy ==
In October 2025, Minister Rob Flack tabled Bill 60, titled the Fighting Delays, Building Faster Act. The bill included a launch of consultations to remove tenant protections for renters in Ontario. The consultations were aimed at revoking the right of renters to remain in their rental unit at the conclusion of a one-year lease, a significant change to the Residential Tenancies Act designed to make evictions easier.

== Electoral record ==
2025 Ontario general election: Elgin—Middlesex—London
Party	Candidate	Votes	%	±%	Expenditures
Progressive Conservative	Rob Flack	28,720	55.78	+4.70	$87,771
Liberal	Douglas MacTavish	12,598	24.47	+7.07	$10,429
New Democratic	Amanda Zavitz	4,738	9.20	–9.01	$11,328
Green	Amanda Stark	2,933	5.70	+1.03	$6,448
New Blue	Brian Figueiredo	1,418	2.75	–2.36	$4,821
Ontario Party	Cooper Labrie	610	1.18	–1.31	$0
None of the Above	Stephen R. Campbell	469	0.91	N/A	$0
Total valid votes/expense limit		51,486	99.06	-0.40	$169,676
Total rejected, unmarked, and declined ballots		487	0.93	+0.40	
Turnout		51,973	49.32	+4.54	
Eligible voters		105,389			
Progressive Conservative hold		Swing		–1.16	
Source: Elections Ontario

2022 Ontario general election: Elgin—Middlesex—London
Party	Candidate	Votes	%	±%	Expenditures
Progressive Conservative	Rob Flack	22,369	51.08	−4.38	$91,316
New Democratic	Andy Kroeker	7,973	18.21	−13.86	$40,974
Liberal	Heather Jackson	7,618	17.40	+10.09	$24,316
New Blue	Matt Millar	2,238	5.11		$11,355
Green	Amanda Stark	2,043	4.67	+0.82	$3,085
Ontario Party	Brigitte Belton	1,092	2.49		$7,006
Freedom	Dave Plumb	261	0.60	+0.07	$0
Consensus Ontario	Malichi Malé	197	0.45		$0
Total valid votes/expense limit		43,791	99.46	+0.44	$137,656
Total rejected, unmarked, and declined ballots		236	0.54	-0.44	
Turnout		44,027	44.78	-14.67	
Eligible voters		97,075			
Progressive Conservative hold		Swing		+4.74	
Source(s): "Summary of Valid Votes Cast for Each Candidate" (PDF). Elections Ontario. 2022. Archived from the original on May 18, 2023.; "Statistical Summary by Electoral District" (PDF). Elections Ontario. 2022. Archived from the original on May 21, 2023.

2021 Canadian federal election: London West
Party	Candidate	Votes	%	±%	Expenditures
Liberal	Arielle Kayabaga	25,308	36.88	-6.08	$91,373.14
Conservative	Rob Flack	22,273	32.46	+4.53	$114,644.53
New Democratic	Shawna Lewkowitz	16,858	24.57	+3.22	$72,003.76
People's	Mike McMullen	3,409	4.97	+3.33	$17,546.25
Libertarian	Jacques Y. Boudreau	773	1.13	+0.4	$0.00
Total valid votes/expense limit		68,621	99.25		
Total rejected ballots		517	0.74	+0.27	
Turnout		69,138	68.49	-3.00	
Eligible voters		100,947			
Liberal hold		Swing		-5.31	
Source: Elections Canada

== Cabinet posts ==
Ford ministry, Province of Ontario (2018–present)
Cabinet post (1)
Predecessor	Office	Successor
	Associate Minister of Housing; September 4, 2023 – Present	Incumbent
