= Bruce Smith (Ontario politician) =

Canadian politician

Ontario MPP
- In office 1995–1999
- Preceded by: Irene Mathyssen
- Succeeded by: riding dissolved
- Constituency: Middlesex

Personal details
- Party: Progressive Conservative
- Profession: City planner

Bruce Smith is a former politician in Ontario, Canada. He served as a Progressive Conservative member of the Legislative Assembly of Ontario from 1995 to 1999.

== Background ==
Smith has a diploma in Urban Design from Fanshawe College, a Bachelor of Arts degree from the University of Waterloo, and a degree in Public Administration from the University of Western Ontario. He worked as a senior planner in the city of London, Ontario after graduating, and was also a planner in the neighbouring township of Westminster. He also served as president of the Middlesex Progressive Conservative Association.

== Politics ==
Smith was elected to the Ontario legislature in the 1995 provincial election in the riding of Middlesex, defeating Liberal Doug Reycraft and incumbent New Democrat Irene Mathyssen. Smith served as a backbench supporter of Mike Harris's government for the next four years.

He ran for re-election in the redistributed riding of Elgin—Middlesex—London in the 1999 election. He lost to Liberal Steve Peters by just over 1,000 votes. He ran against Peters again in the 2003 election but lost by over 11,000 votes.

== Later life ==
He is currently chair of the Fanshawe College Board of Governors. Smith endorsed Frank Klees for the leadership of the Ontario PC Party in 2004.

== See also ==
- List of University of Waterloo people
