= Thunder Bay (electoral district) =

Former electoral district in Ontario, Canada

Ontario electoral district

Defunct federal electoral district
- Legislature: House of Commons
- District created: 1966
- District abolished: 1976
- First contested: 1968
- Last contested: 1974

Thunder Bay was an electoral district in the northwestern part of Ontario, Canada, that was represented in the House of Commons of Canada from 1968 to 1979.

== Federal district ==
This riding was created in 1966 from parts of Fort William, Kenora—Rainy River and Port Arthur ridings.

It consisted of the eastern part of the territorial district of Rainy River; (b) the territorial district of Thunder Bay excluding the Cities of Fort William and Port Arthur and the Townships of Aldina, Blake, Crooks, Devon, Fraleigh, Gillies, Hartington, Lismore, Lybster, Marks, Neebing, O'Connor, Paipoonge, Pardee, Pearson, Scoble, Strange, Adrian, Blackwell, Conmee, Forbes, Fowler, Goldie, Gorham, Horne, Jacques, Laurie, MacGregor, McIntyre, McTavish, Oliver, Sackville, Sibley and Ware; the southeastern part of the territorial district of Kenora; part of the Patricia Portion of the territorial district of Kenora; and the western part of the territorial district of Algoma.

The electoral district was abolished in 1976 when it was redistributed between Cochrane North, Kenora—Rainy River, Thunder Bay—Atikokan and Thunder Bay—Nipigon ridings.

Parliament	Years	Member	Party
Riding created from Fort William, Kenora—Rainy River and Port Arthur
28th	1968–1972	Keith Penner	Liberal
29th	1972–1974	Keith Penner	Liberal
30th	1974–1979	Keith Penner	Liberal
Riding dissolved into Cochrane North, Kenora—Rainy River, Thunder Bay—Atikokan and Thunder Bay—Nipigon

== Electoral history ==
1968 Canadian federal election
Party	Candidate	Votes	%	±%
Liberal	B. Keith Penner	9,540		
New Democratic	Douglas M. Sly	6,081		
Progressive Conservative	George C. Wardrope	4,904		

1972 Canadian federal election
Party	Candidate	Votes	%	±%
Liberal	Keith Penner	11,048		
New Democratic	Ike Mutch	6,309		
Progressive Conservative	Harvey Smith	5,095		

1974 Canadian federal election
Party	Candidate	Votes	%	±%
Liberal	Keith Penner	11,435		
New Democratic	Carson Hoy	5,475		
Progressive Conservative	Berek Kadikoff	4,021		

== See also ==
- List of Canadian electoral districts
- Historical federal electoral districts of Canada
