= Marcel Léger (Ontario politician) =

Canadian politician

Ontario MPP
- In office June 8, 1949 – October 6, 1951
- Preceded by: John Carrère
- Succeeded by: Philip Kelly
- Constituency: Cochrane North

Personal details
- Party: Progressive Conservative

Marcel Léger was a Canadian politician, who represented the electoral district of Cochrane North in the Legislative Assembly of Ontario from 1949 to 1951.

A teacher from Hearst, he won the district in a by-election following the death in office of his predecessor, John Carrère. A member of the Ontario Progressive Conservative Party, his sole challenger was a member of the Co-operative Commonwealth Federation, which led premier Leslie Frost to assert that the vote was a high-stakes battle in which free enterprise was at stake.

Léger served in the backbenches throughout his time in the legislature, although he was given the honour of seconding the motion to accept the Speech from the Throne at the start of the 1950 session. Outside of the house, he worked to help establish a senior's home in Hearst.

Léger did not run for another term in the 1951 Ontario general election.
