= Gordon Ellis =

British painter (1920–1978)

- Born: Ian Gordon Ellis; 17 July 1920; Warrington, Lancashire, England
- Died: 3 December 1978 (aged 58)
- Education: Merchant Taylors School, Crosby
- Known for: Marine art; naval architecture
- Spouse: Barbara Kay

Ian Gordon Ellis (17 July 1920 – 3 December 1978) was a British artist who specialised in maritime painting. He had his first commission published in the Liverpool Daily Post at the age of thirteen and after a period as a draughtsman became a professional artist in 1948. Ellis was often commissioned by shipping companies to create paintings of newly launched vessels.

== Biography ==
Ellis was born in 1920 in Warrington, Lancashire. His father, Aytoun Ellis, was a writer and historian, and also a descendant of the artist George Frederic Watts. Ellis was educated at the Merchant Taylors School in Crosby where his artistic talent was encouraged. During this time he was given special dispensation to visit the docks to practise his craft. Ellis was an accomplished painter from an early age, with his first commission being published in the Liverpool Daily Post when just thirteen years old. He had two works, including one depicting the Royal Navy training ship HMS Nile, featured in the Tatler periodical whilst still in his teens; however at the time his age was not divulged.

During World War II Ellis was a draughtsman in Clydebank, contributing to the design and production of many wartime vessels for John Brown & Company. While his main abode as an adult was in Berwick-upon-Tweed, Ellis's art continued to be linked with the ships and dockside area of Merseyside, even while he also worked in the landscape and portrait genres. Turning to become a professional artist in 1948 when 27 years old, Ellis was often commissioned by shipping companies to paint their newly launched vessels, which was a regular custom at that time. In his 1986 book, the art historian Arthur Davidson stated that Ellis "executed commissions that could be viewed not only as works of art, but analysed as elegant representations of visual scholarship". Recognised for his attention to detail, prolific output, and research into his subjects, by 1958 it was reported that his paintings had international impact.

Ellis's work was principally sold and exhibited at the Boydell Galleries in Liverpool. His paintings are featured in a number of permanent public collections including those of the Science Museum, the Merseyside Maritime Museum, the Kirkcaldy Galleries, and the Museu de Marinha. Ellis died from a heart attack in 1978.
