= Harry Allen (Ontario politician) =

Canadian politician

Ontario MPP
- In office 1945–1963
- Preceded by: Daniel McIntyre
- Succeeded by: Neil Olde
- Constituency: Middlesex South

Personal details
- Born: January 26, 1889; Lambeth, London, Ontario
- Died: September 13, 1963 (aged 74); London, Ontario
- Political party: Progressive Conservative
- Occupation: Farmer, lumberman

Harry Marshall Allen (January 26, 1889 – September 13, 1963) was a Canadian politician who was a Member of Provincial Parliament in Legislative Assembly of Ontario from 1945 to 1963. He represented the riding of Middlesex South for the Progressive Conservative Party of Ontario.

Born in Lambeth, Ontario, he was a farmer and lumberman. He died in office in 1963 of a heart attack.
