= Keith Penner =

Canadian politician (born 1933)

Keith Penner (born May 1, 1933) is a Canadian public official and former politician. He is best known for having chaired a House of Commons committee on Indian self-government in the early 1980s, and for the report of the committee known as the Penner Report.

== Early life ==
Raised in Alberta, Penner later moved to Northern Ontario. Penner completed his undergraduate degree at the University of Alberta and earned master's degrees from the University of Toronto and the University of Ottawa. He also pursued post-degree studies at Queen's University and McMaster University.

== Political career ==
Penner entered politics in the 1968 federal election and was elected the Liberal MP for the Electoral District of Thunder Bay, Ontario. He was re-elected in 1972 and 1974 for the Thunder Bay District and then in the 1979, 1980 and 1984 federal elections representing Cochrane) (later Cochrane—Superior). Penner served as Parliamentary Secretary to the Minister of Science and Technology and to the Minister of Indian Affairs and Northern Development. He did not seek re-election in the 1988 election.

== Indian Affairs and Northern Development ==
In the 1980s, Penner was Chair of the Standing Committee on Indian Affairs and Northern Development. The Committee released a report on Native Self-governance in 1983. Often referred to as the Penner Report, it recommended the recognition of First Nations people as a distinct, constitutionally protected order of government within Canada and with a full range of government powers. The Report recommended that the provinces be removed from any jurisdiction concerning Aboriginal affairs and that a government structure for First Nations be regarded as the equivalent to a province, with financial support from the federal government in an arrangement that would be recognised in the Constitution of Canada. While the Liberal government of the day tabled in the House of Commons a relatively favourable response on March 5, 1984, a few months later Prime Minister Pierre Trudeau had resigned, John Turner became Prime Minister, Indian Affairs Minister John Munro was not named by Turner as a Minister, and in September 1984, the Conservative Government of Brian Mulroney swept into power.

== Post political career ==
During the academic year 1987-88, prior to announcing that he would not seek re-election, Penner was a visiting fellow in the School of Political Science at Queen's University. He is a member of the Chartered Institute of Logistics and Transport (North America) and served as its Chairman from 2003 to 2007. He was appointed as a member of the Canadian Transportation Agency in 1989.. Penner served with the agency until his retirement, in 2003. While there, he took a lead in the adoption of ADR (Alternate Dispute Resolution) into the Agency's protocol. He also continued to write and speak of the need for Indigenous Self-Government as a Distinct Order of Government in Canada. After leaving the Agency, Penner established his own Commercial Dispute Resolution Firm. He became a coach-teacher with the Stitt/Feld/Handy Group and the University of Windsor in Mediation Training. From 2005 until 2016 he heard cases for the Ontario Licence Appeal Tribunal and he continues to serve as a Designated Arbitrator with ICDR (The International Centre for Dispute Resolution) which is affiliated with the American Arbitration Association. In 2023, his term with the AAA as Arbitrator, was renewed for three years. Penner is listed in the Whose Who in America. In 2009, Penner worked with the Algonquins of Barrier Lake in Quebec in an effort to assist them in the re-establishment of their Traditional Government. Due to an intra-community dispute, the result was challenged in the Federal Court of Canada. Those who sought the return of Traditional Government lost the case, but Penner's work earned praise in the Decision and with the Algonquin people of Barrier Lake. Recently, Penner has been invited to participate in a First Nations' Think Tank called the Yellowhead Institute of Ryerson University. In 2010, Penner was the recipient of the Distinguished Service Award of the Canadian Association of Former Parliamentarians, cited in particular for his "continued interest and activity in the promotion of education, aboriginal rights and parliamentary democracy in Canada and abroad." Keith Penner is married to Brenda Morrissey of Newfoundland. The couple continue to live there for a part of each year.
