= Len Wood =

Canadian politician

Ontario MPP
- In office 1990–1999
- Preceded by: René Fontaine
- Succeeded by: Riding dissolved
- Constituency: Cochrane North

Personal details
- Born: February 4, 1942 (age 84) Mitchell, Ontario
- Party: New Democrat
- Occupation: Mechanic

Leonard Wood (born February 4, 1942) is a former Canadian politician. He was a member of the Legislative Assembly of Ontario from 1990 to 1999, sitting for the New Democratic Party of Ontario.

== Background ==
Wood completed a four-year millwright course after graduating from high school, and worked as a millwright mechanic before entering politics. He was actively involved in the labour movement and the Roman Catholic church.

== Politics ==
In 1987 he contested Cochrane North (located in the province's northeastern corner) in the 1987 provincial election, but lost to Liberal incumbent René Fontaine by almost 4,000 votes. In the federal election of 1988, he contested Cochrane—Superior for the federal NDP and lost to Liberal Réginald Bélair by 1,201 votes.

The NDP won the 1990 provincial election and Wood defeated Liberal Donald Grenier to win Cochrane North by 143 votes. He served as Parliamentary assistant to the Minister of Natural Resources from 1990 to 1995.

Voting trends in the 1995 provincial election were against the NDP in most parts of Ontario, and the party fell from government to third-party status. In Cochrane North, Wood countered the provincial trend and dramatically increased his majority: he defeated Liberal candidate Gilles Gagnon by almost 2,000 votes. In opposition, he served as critic for Northern Development and Mines.

Redistribution eliminated Cochrane North in the 1999 provincial election, and Wood sought re-election in the newly formed riding of Timiskaming—Cochrane. He finished third, behind fellow incumbent David Ramsay of the Liberal Party and Rick Brassard of the Progressive Conservatives.

Wood ran again for the federal NDP in the 2000 election in Timmins-James Bay, but lost to Bélair by 6,950 votes.
