= Doug Reycraft =

Canadian politician

Mayor of Southwest Middlesex
- In office 2001–2014
- Preceded by: first mayor
- Succeeded by: Vance Blackmore

Ontario MPP
- In office 1985–1990
- Preceded by: Bob Eaton
- Succeeded by: Irene Mathyssen
- Constituency: Middlesex

Personal details
- Born: March 9, 1943 (age 83) London, Ontario
- Party: Liberal
- Profession: Teacher

Douglas Richard Reycraft (born March 9, 1943) is a former politician in Ontario, Canada. He was a Liberal member in the Legislative Assembly of Ontario from 1985 to 1990 who represented the southwestern Ontario riding of Middlesex. From 2001 to 2014 he was mayor of Southwest Middlesex.

== Background ==
Reycraft was born and raised in London, Ontario. He attended London Teachers' College and the University of Western Ontario, and worked as a teacher.

== Politics ==
Reycraft was a councillor, deputy reeve and reeve in the Village of Glencoe, and served as a warden of Middlesex County.

He was elected to the Ontario legislature in the 1985 provincial election, defeating Progressive Conservative incumbent Bob Eaton by 810 votes in the rural riding of Middlesex. The Liberal Party formed government following this election. He was re-elected by a greater margin in the 1987 election. He served as Chief Government Whip from September 29, 1987 to August 2, 1989.

The Liberals lost the 1990 provincial election to the New Democratic Party, and Reycraft lost his riding to NDP candidate Irene Mathyssen by 520 votes. He attempted a comeback in the 1995 election, but lost to Bruce Smith of the Progressive Conservatives.

Reycraft returned to municipal politics, and was elected mayor of Southwest Middlesex, Ontario in 2000. He was returned in 2003 by only 26 votes over challenger Tom Jeffrey, and was re-elected in 2006 and 2010. He lost re-election in 2014 by 17 votes to Deputy Mayor Vance Blackmore.

Reycraft also served as chair of the London-Middlesex Board of Health, chair of the London Middlesex Housing Authority, president of the Association of Municipalities of Ontario, chair of the Board of Directors of the Municipal Employers Pension Centre of Ontario and co-chair of the National Municipal Rail Safety Working Group of the Federation of Canadian Municipalities.

His son Sean Reycraft is a television writer and producer.
