= John Raymond O'Neill =

Canadian politician

Member of Parliament for Timiskaming North
- In office October 1925 – September 1926
- Preceded by: riding created
- Succeeded by: Joseph-Arthur Bradette

Personal details
- Born: John Raymond O'Neill; 19 January 1891 Almonte, Ontario
- Died: 18 July 1951 (aged 60)
- Party: Conservative
- Spouse: Married
- Profession: Promoter, prospector

John Raymond O'Neill (19 January 1891 – 18 July 1951) was a Conservative member of the House of Commons of Canada. He was born in Almonte, Ontario and became a promoter and prospector.

O'Neill attended school at Almonte then St. Michael's College and the University of Toronto where he attained his Bachelor of Arts degree.

He made an unsuccessful bid for a Legislative Assembly of Ontario seat in the 1923 provincial election.

He was elected to Parliament at the Timiskaming North riding in the 1925 general election. After serving only one term, the 15th Canadian Parliament, he was defeated by Joseph-Arthur Bradette of the Liberals.
