= Party of Objective Truth =

- Leader: Derek Lionel Matthews
- President: Derek Lionel Matthews
- Founded: 2018
- Dissolved: 2019
- Headquarters: 388 Talbot St., St. Thomas, Ontario
- Ideology: Meritocratic social democracy
- Seats in Legislature: 0 / 124

Website
- objectivetruth.xyz

The Party of Objective Truth (listed on the ballots as P.O.T.) was a minor political party in the province of Ontario, Canada. It was registered as a party on the last possible day for the 2018 election, and ran candidates in two ridings in that election.

The party website contains a map with a pin placed at the party headquarters, 388 Talbot St., St. Thomas, Ontario, which falls within the riding of Elgin—Middlesex—London, where the P.O.T. had nominated Henri Barrette as its candidate. Derrick Lionel Matthews ran for the P.O.T. in Nepean.

== Election results ==
Election results
Election year	No. of overall votes	% of overall total	No. of candidates run	No. of seats won	+/−	Government
2018	212	0.0%	2	0	New Party	Extra-parliamentary
