= John Carrère (politician) =

Canadian politician

Johnny Carrère

Ontario MPP
- In office 1948–1948
- Preceded by: Joseph-Anaclet Habel
- Succeeded by: Marcel Léger
- Constituency: Cochrane North

Personal details
- Born: January 25, 1911 Cochrane, Ontario
- Died: October 6, 1948 (aged 37) Cochrane, Ontario
- Party: Progressive Conservative

Military service
- Allegiance: Canadian (Note: Served with the French Air Force from 1939 to 1940.)
- Branch/service: Royal Canadian Air Force
- Years of service: 1941-1945
- Rank: Flight-Lieutenant
- Unit: Pathfinders
- Awards: DFC

Jean-Pierre Henri "Johnny" Carrère (January 25, 1911 - October 6, 1948) DFC was a Canadian politician, who represented the electoral district of Cochrane North in the Legislative Assembly of Ontario in 1948. A member of the Ontario Progressive Conservative Party, he was elected in the 1948 election, but died in a car accident after just a few months in office.

He died October 5, 1948, after sustaining injuries in a collision with his vehicle and a train.
