= Ralph Stewart (Canadian politician) =

Canadian politician

Ralph Wesley Stewart

Member of Parliament for Cochrane
- In office June 1968 – March 1979

Personal details
- Born: 30 December 1929 Cochrane, Ontario
- Died: 11 February 2004 (aged 74)
- Party: Liberal; Progressive Conservative
- Profession: consultant, orchestra conductor, public servant

Ralph Wesley Stewart (30 December 1929 – 11 February 2004) was a Liberal party member of the House of Commons of Canada, who briefly joined the Progressive Conservative party. He was born in Cochrane, Ontario and became a consultant, orchestra conductor and public servant by career.

He was first elected at the Cochrane riding in the 1968 general election, and re-elected there in the 1972 and 1974 federal elections.

On 7 March 1979, in the final days of the 30th Canadian Parliament, Stewart switched to the Progressive Conservative party citing objections to the Liberals' handling of bilingualism and economic policy. However, his federal political career ended when he was unable to represent the Progressive Conservatives at Cochrane, and instead his party's local riding association chose 22-year-old Carole Kosowan as their candidate for the 1979 general election. After the election, which returned a Progressive Conservative government, Stewart was rewarded with the Post of Consul General in Atlanta, Georgia. When the Liberals returned to power, he was asked to resign, but having negotiated a four-year appointment with a firm contract, he was paid for the full term. He later relocated to Naples, Florida.
