= Cochrane (federal electoral district) =

Former federal electoral district in Ontario, Canada

Ontario electoral district

Defunct federal electoral district
- Legislature: House of Commons
- District created: 1933
- District abolished: 1976
- First contested: 1935
- Last contested: 1974

Cochrane (also known as Cochrane North and Cochrane—Superior) was a federal electoral district in the province of Ontario, Canada. It was represented in the House of Commons of Canada from 1935 to 1997.

== Electoral district ==
This riding was created in 1933 as "Cochrane" from parts of Timiskaming North riding. The electoral district was abolished in 1996 when it was redistributed between Algoma, Kenora—Rainy River, Thunder Bay—Nipigon, Timiskaming—Cochrane and Timmins-James Bay ridings.

=== Geography ===
It initially consisted of the northern part of the territorial district of Timiskaming, and the eastern part of the territorial district of Cochrane and the district of Patricia. In Timiskaming, the riding included the part of the district lying north of and including the townships of Pontiac and Keefer and the townships in between them. In Cochrane, it included the part of the district lying east of a line drawn along the eastern boundaries of the townships of McCoig and Mulloy and north to the northern limit of the district. In Patricia, it included the part lying east of the projection north of the western boundary of the electoral district of Cochrane.

In 1947, it was redefined to consist of the northern part of the territorial district of Cochrane and the eastern part of the district of Patricia. In the 1960s, it was redefined to consist of the northern parts of the territorial district of Algoma, Cochrane, Kenora (Patricia Portion), Sudbury and Timiskaming.

The electoral district was abolished in 1976 when it was redistributed between Algoma, Cochrane North, Timiskaming and Timmins—Chapleau ridings.

"Cochrane North" was formed in 1976 from parts of Cochrane and Thunder Bay ridings. It consisted of the northern part of the Territorial District of Algoma, northwest part of the Territorial District of Cochrane, the eastern part of the Territorial District of Kenora (Patricia Portion), and the southeast part of the Territorial District of Thunder Bay. The name of the electoral district was changed in 1977 to "Cochrane", and in 1980 to "Cochrane—Superior".

Cochrane—Superior initially consisted of the northern part of the Territorial District of Algoma, the north-west of the Territorial District of Cochrane, the eastern part of the Territorial District of Kenora (Patricia Portion), and the south-east part of the Territorial District of Thunder Bay.

It was redefined in 1987 to consist of the north-east part of the Territorial District of Algoma, the north-west part of the Territorial District of Cochrane, the eastern part of the Territorial District of Kenora, and the eastern part of the Territorial District of Thunder Bay.

== Members of Parliament ==
This riding has elected the following members of Parliament:

Parliament	Years	Member	Party
Cochrane; Riding created from Timiskaming North
18th	1935–1940	Joseph-Arthur Bradette	Liberal
19th	1940–1945	Joseph-Arthur Bradette	Liberal
20th	1945–1949	Joseph-Arthur Bradette	Liberal
21st	1949–1953	Joseph-Arthur Bradette	Liberal
22nd	1953–1957	Joseph-Anaclet Habel	Liberal
23rd	1957–1958	Joseph-Anaclet Habel	Liberal
24th	1958–1962	Joseph-Anaclet Habel	Liberal
25th	1962–1963	Joseph-Anaclet Habel	Liberal
26th	1963–1965	Joseph-Anaclet Habel	Liberal
27th	1965–1968	Joseph-Anaclet Habel	Liberal
28th	1968–1972	Ralph Stewart	Liberal
29th	1972–1974	Ralph Stewart	Liberal
30th	1974–1979	Ralph Stewart	Liberal
Cochrane North
31st	1979–1980	Keith Penner	Liberal
32nd	1980–1984	Keith Penner	Liberal
Cochrane—Superior
33rd	1984–1988	Keith Penner	Liberal
34th	1988–1993	Réginald Bélair	Liberal
35th	1993–1997	Réginald Bélair	Liberal
Riding dissolved into Algoma, Kenora—Rainy River, Thunder Bay—Nipigon, Timiskaming—Cochrane and Timmins-James Bay

== Election results ==
=== Cochrane ===
1935 Canadian federal election
Party	Candidate	Votes
Liberal	Joseph-Arthur Bradette	12,719
Co-operative Commonwealth	Harry Hughes Beach	3,247
Reconstruction	Andrew Patrick Murtagh	2,593
Communist	Thomas McEwen	1,004

1940 Canadian federal election
Party	Candidate	Votes
Liberal	Joseph-Arthur Bradette	16,785
National Government	Robert Whitney Crumb	5,652
Farmer–Labour	W. Garth Teeple	3,922

1945 Canadian federal election
Party	Candidate	Votes
Liberal	Joseph-Arthur Bradette	13,285
Co-operative Commonwealth	Wilfrid Parisien	7,355
Progressive Conservative	Joseph Wilfrid Spooner	4,711

1949 Canadian federal election
Party	Candidate	Votes
Liberal	Joseph-Arthur Bradette	6,352
Progressive Conservative	René-Joseph-Napoléon Brunelle	3,885
Co-operative Commonwealth	Elmo-Stanislas Lefebvre	2,331
Union des électeurs	Joseph-Apolidor-Flor Ayotte	891

1953 Canadian federal election
Party	Candidate	Votes
Liberal	Joseph-Anaclet Habel	6,667
Progressive Conservative	René Joseph Napoléon Brunelle	5,194
Co-operative Commonwealth	John Pereira Carter	2,448

1957 Canadian federal election
Party	Candidate	Votes
Liberal	Joseph-Anaclet Habel	6,626
Progressive Conservative	Elmo Lefebvre	3,319
Co-operative Commonwealth	Norman Lacasse	2,552
Independent Social Credit	André J. Filion	2,351

1958 Canadian federal election
Party	Candidate	Votes
Liberal	Joseph-Anaclet Habel	7,851
Progressive Conservative	René Brunelle	6,941
Co-operative Commonwealth	James Ballantyne	2,729

1962 Canadian federal election
Party	Candidate	Votes
Liberal	Joseph-Anaclet Habel	7,969
New Democratic	Ross A. Paterson	4,814
Progressive Conservative	François Bordeleau	4,072
Social Credit	Levi Albert	1,459

1963 Canadian federal election
Party	Candidate	Votes
Liberal	Joseph-Anaclet Habel	7,809
New Democratic	Ross A. Paterson	5,498
Progressive Conservative	Mike Palangio	3,276
Social Credit	Alphonse Brisson	2,204

1965 Canadian federal election
Party	Candidate	Votes
Liberal	Joseph-Anaclet Habel	7,505
New Democratic	Ross A. Paterson	6,685
Progressive Conservative	Bob Moore	3,025
Social Credit	Alphonse Brisson	837
Independent	Philip Kelly	316

1968 Canadian federal election
Party	Candidate	Votes
Liberal	Ralph Stewart	9,803
New Democratic	Ross A. Paterson	7,034
Progressive Conservative	George W. Maybury	2,875
Social Credit	Jeanne Lavoie	433

1972 Canadian federal election
Party	Candidate	Votes
Liberal	Ralph Stewart	10,405
New Democratic	Bud Constantine	5,405
Progressive Conservative	Blair Brown	4,626
Social Credit	Emmanuel Petrin	1,477
Independent	Richard B. Mullins	204

1974 Canadian federal election
Party	Candidate	Votes
Liberal	Ralph Stewart	11,379
New Democratic	Carol Brixhe	5,539
Progressive Conservative	Alphonse Touchette	2,957
Not affiliated	François Gosselin	1,099

=== Cochrane North ===
1979 Canadian federal election
Party	Candidate	Votes
Liberal	Keith Penner	12,889
New Democratic	Robert Fortin	11,080
Progressive Conservative	Carole Kosowan	5,001

1980 Canadian federal election
Party	Candidate	Votes
Liberal	Keith Penner	15,280
New Democratic	Robert Fortin	10,814
Progressive Conservative	J. Elgin Turner	2,852
Marxist–Leninist	Doris Stevens	111

=== Cochrane—Superior ===
1984 Canadian federal election
Party	Candidate	Votes
Liberal	Keith Penner	12,359
Progressive Conservative	Guy Desjardins	9,590
New Democratic	Ray Brunet	7,672

1988 Canadian federal election
Party	Candidate	Votes
Liberal	Réginald Bélair	11,954
New Democratic	Len Wood	10,753
Progressive Conservative	Guy Desjardins	7,032

1993 Canadian federal election
Party	Candidate	Votes
Liberal	Réginald Bélair	19,511
Reform	Don Banks	2,590
Progressive Conservative	Muriel J. Parent	2,470
New Democratic	Jean Paul Lajeunesse	2,429

== See also ==
- List of Canadian electoral districts
- Historical federal electoral districts of Canada
