= Boston (surname) =

Boston is a surname. Notable people with the surname include:

- Absalom Boston (1785–1855), American mariner
- Aliyah Boston (born 2001), American basketball player
- Andrew Boston (born 1994), Australian rules footballer
- Archie Boston Jr. (born 1943), American graphic artist and retired professor
- Bernie Boston (1933–2008), American photographer
- Blake Boston (born 1990), American rapper and subject of an internet meme
- Bob Boston (1918–2002), American baseball player
- Brad Boston (born 1974), Canadian sailor
- Brandon Boston Jr. (born 2001), American basketball player
- Bruce Boston (1943–2024), American writer and poet
- Billy Boston (born 1934), Welsh rugby league footballer
- Chief Boston (1917–2002), American football player, college football coach, and United States Army officer
- David Boston (born 1978), American football player
- Daryl Boston (born 1963), American baseball player
- Denzel Boston (born 2003), American football player
- Frank Boston (1938–2011), American politician
- Frank E. Boston (1890–1960), American physician
- Granger Boston (1921–1958), English cricketer
- Gretha Boston (born 1959), American singer and actress
- Henry Josiah Lightfoot Boston (1898–1969), Sierra Leonean diplomat and politician
- Jacques Boston (born 1973), Guinean Anglican bishop
- John Boston (brewer) (died 1804), Australian brewer
- John Boston (politician) (c. 1832–after 1880), American politician
- Jonathan Boston (born 1957), New Zealand academic
- Justin Boston (born 1989), American racing driver
- Lawrence Boston (born 1956), American former basketball player
- Leonard N. Boston (1871–1931), American physician
- Lucy M. Boston (1892–1990), British author
- McKinley Boston (born 1945), American university administrator
- Nigel Boston (1961–2024), British-American mathematician
- Paul Boston (born 1952), Australian artist
- Penelope Boston, American speleologist and astrobiologist
- Peter Boston (1918–1999), British architect and illustrator, son of Lucy M. Boston
- Prince Boston (born 1750), American enslaved person, uncle of Absalom Boston
- Rachel Boston (born 1982), American model and actress
- Ralph Boston (1939–2023), American track and field athlete
- Richard Boston (1938–2006), British journalist and writer
- Rob Boston (born 1962), American author, advocate of church-state separation
- Robert Boston (politician) (c. 1836–1922), Canadian politician and farmer
- Roseina Boston (1935–2018), Australian musician
- Shelly Boston (born 1975), Australian former basketball player
- Terence Boston, Baron Boston of Faversham (1930–2011), British politician
- Thomas Boston (1676–1732), Scottish theologian
- Tre Boston (born 1992), American football player
- Walter Boston (1874–1968), Australian politician
- Ward Boston (1923–2008), United States Navy captain

== See also ==
- Carey Hoyt Bostian (1907–2000), American educator and Chancellor of North Carolina State University
