= Ontario Highway 135 =

Former Ontario provincial highway

Highway 135
- Exeter Road

Route information
- Maintained by London, Ontario
- Length: 6.6 km (4.1 mi)
- Existed: June 27, 1957–October 1, 1993

Major junctions
- West end: Highway 4 / Colonel Talbot Road
- East end: Highway 401

Location
- Country: Canada
- Province: Ontario
- Counties: Middlesex
- Major cities: London, Lambeth

Highway system
- Ontario provincial highways; Current; Former; 400-series
← Highway 134	→ Highway 136

King's Highway 135, commonly referred to as Highway 135, was a provincially maintained highway in the Canadian province of Ontario on the southern edge of London, following Exeter Road, which it is better known as. The road's main purpose was to link Highway 401 in London with Highway 2 in Lambeth, at a time when the London-area section of Highway 401 was only completed to the interchange with Highway 4 (Colonel Talbot Road).

Highway 135 was designated in 1957, alongside the newly opened section of Highway 401 between London and Woodstock. It remained in place as the freeway network grew around it. With the completion of Highway 402 to Sarnia in 1982, Highway 135 no longer served as a long-distance route. As a result, it was decommissioned in 1993, and is now known as Exeter Road.

== Route description ==
Highway 135 was a short route that travelled along present day Exeter Road on the south side of London. At its western terminus, the highway began at an intersection with Highway 2 and Highway 4 (Wharncliffe Road) near Lambeth in the Longwoods neighbourhood of London. After immediately intersecting Wonderland Road, which did not continue south at the time, it passed east through a mix of farmland and development. To the north lay the Southwest Optimist Park baseball fields, while the Meadowland Business Park followed by a large industrial area near White Oak Road lay to the south. East of the intersection with that White Oak Road, Highway 135 ran between residential subdivision in the White Oaks neighbourhood to the north, and commercial properties to the south.

At the intersection with Sholto Drive, the route passed north of the Ministry of Municipal Affairs and Housing, as well as the City of London Exeter Road Operations Centre. At Wellington Road, which the route turned south onto, it encountered the Crossroads Centre shopping mall as well several large hotel chains. Highway 135 ended a short distance south at Highway 401 at Exit 186.

== History ==
Highway 135 was established in 1957 alongside the opening of Highway 401 between London and Woodstock. It provided a more direct route between Highway 401 and Highway 2, which continued towards Windsor. At that time, Highway 401 was yet to be constructed between Tilbury and London. Highway 401 was opened on May 31, 1957. Exeter Road was designated as Highway 135 one month later on June 27 at a length of 6.1 kilometres (3.8 mi).

The usefulness of Highway 135 as a shortcut to Windsor dwindled significantly in 1963, when Highway 401 was completed from Tilbury to Highway 4 as a grade-separated super two freeway. However, it was still a provincially significant highway as it allowed motorists headed to and from Sarnia to travel via Highway 2, Highway 81 and Highway 7. Until the 1970s, Highway 402 was only completed in the Sarnia area; construction west to London began in 1974 and was completed in 1982. Consequently, the significance of Highway 135 was greatly reduced. The lack of provincial significance and the increasing urbanisation of the route led the Ministry of Transportation to transfer jurisdiction to the City of London on October 1, 1993. Today, the road is known as Exeter Road.

== Major intersections ==
The following table lists the major junctions along Highway 135, as noted by the Ministry of Transportation of Ontario. The entire route was located in Middlesex County.

Location	km	mi	Destinations	Notes
Lambeth	0.0	0.0	Highway 2 / Highway 4 (Wharncilffe Road South)	
Westminster	0.3	0.19	County Road 52 (Wonderland Road)	
Westminster	3.0	1.9	County Road 43 (White Oaks Road)	
London	5.6	3.5	Wellington Road	
London	6.1	3.8	Highway 401 – Windsor, Toronto	
London	6.6	4.1	County Road 37	
1.000 mi = 1.609 km; 1.000 km = 0.621 mi
