= William Frank (politician) =

Canadian politician (1923–2023)

William Charles Frank

Member of Parliament for Middlesex
- In office October 1972 – May 1974
- Preceded by: Jim Lind
- Succeeded by: Larry Condon

Personal details
- Born: 24 September 1923 London Township, Ontario, Canada
- Died: 18 January 2023 (aged 99) London Township, Ontario, Canada
- Party: Progressive Conservative
- Profession: Businessman, merchant

William Charles Frank (24 July 1923 – 18 January 2023) was a Canadian Progressive Conservative politician who was a member of the House of Commons of Canada. He was a businessman and merchant by career and was very involved in his local community.

== Life and career ==
Frank was born in London Township, Ontario on 24 July 1923. He first attempted to seek election as a Member of Parliament at the Middlesex riding in the 1968 federal election but was defeated by Jim Lind of the Liberal party. Frank made another attempt in the 1972 general election and succeeded, however, he only served in the 29th Canadian Parliament. With changes to electoral district boundaries, he campaigned in the new Middlesex—London—Lambton riding in the following election and lost to Liberal candidate Larry Condon. Bill Frank made one more unsuccessful attempt to return to Parliament in the 1980 election at London—Middlesex, but again a Liberal candidate, Garnet Bloomfield, won.

Frank died in London Township, Ontario on 18 January 2023, at the age of 99.
