= Middlesex East (federal electoral district) =

Former federal electoral district in Ontario, Canada

Ontario electoral district

Defunct federal electoral district
- Legislature: House of Commons
- District created: 1867
- District abolished: 1966
- First contested: 1867
- Last contested: 1965

Middlesex East was a former federal electoral district in Ontario, Canada, represented in the House of Commons of Canada from 1867 to 1968. It was created by the British North America Act 1867, which divided the County of Middlesex into three ridings: Middlesex North, Middlesex West and Middlesex East.

In 1882, the East Riding of the county of Middlesex it was defined as consisting of the townships of London, West Nissouri, North Dorchester and South Dorchester, the town of London East and the villages of London West and Springfield.

In 1903, the east riding was defined to consist of the townships of Dorchester North, London, Nissouri West and Westminster.

In 1914, the county of Middlesex was divided into two ridings, Middlesex East and Middlesex West. The east riding consisted of the townships of Dorchester North, London, Nissouri West, Westminster and Biddulph, the village of Lucan and those portions of the city of London not included in London city riding.

In 1924, it was redefined to consist of the part of the county of Middlesex lying east of and including the townships of Biddulph, London and Westminster, and those portions of the city of London not included in London city riding.

In 1947, it was redefined to consist of the townships of North Dorchester, London, West Nissouri and Westminster, and the eastern part of the City of London.

In 1952, it was redefined to consist of the Townships of Dorchester North, Nissouri West, Westminster, the eastern part of the Township of London, and the eastern part of the City of London.

The electoral district was abolished in 1966 when it was redistributed between London East, London West and Middlesex ridings.

It was re-created in 1976 from parts of Huron—Middlesex, London East and Middlesex—London—Lambton ridings, but was renamed London—Middlesex in 1977 before any election was held in the riding.

== Members of Parliament ==
This riding elected the following members of the House of Commons of Canada:

Parliament	Years	Member	Party
1st	1867–1872	Crowell Willson	Liberal–Conservative
2nd	1872–1874	David Glass	Conservative
3rd	1874–1874	Crowell Willson	Liberal–Conservative
3rd	1875–1878	Duncan Macmillan	Liberal–Conservative
4th	1878–1882	Duncan Macmillan	Liberal–Conservative
5th	1882–1887	Duncan Macmillan	Liberal–Conservative
6th	1887–1891	Joseph Henry Marshall	Conservative
7th	1891–1892	Joseph Henry Marshall	Conservative
7th	1892–1896	Joseph Henry Marshall	Conservative
8th	1896–1900	James Gilmour	Conservative
9th	1900–1904	James Gilmour	Conservative
10th	1904–1908	Peter Elson	Conservative
11th	1908–1911	Peter Elson	Conservative
12th	1911–1913†	Peter Elson	Conservative
12th	1913–1917	Samuel Francis Glass	Conservative
13th	1917–1921	Samuel Francis Glass	Government (Unionist)
14th	1921–1925	Archie Latimer Hodgins	Progressive
15th	1925–1926	Adam King Hodgins	Conservative
16th	1926–1930	Adam King Hodgins	Conservative
17th	1930–1935	Frank Boyes	Conservative
18th	1935–1940	Duncan Graham Ross	Liberal
19th	1940–1945	Duncan Graham Ross	Liberal
20th	1945–1949	Harry Oliver White	Progressive Conservative
21st	1949–1953	Harry Oliver White	Progressive Conservative
22nd	1953–1957	Harry Oliver White	Progressive Conservative
23rd	1957–1958	Harry Oliver White	Progressive Conservative
24th	1958–1962	Harry Oliver White	Progressive Conservative
25th	1962–1963	Campbell Millar	Progressive Conservative
26th	1963–1965	Campbell Millar	Progressive Conservative
27th	1965–1968	Jim Lind	Liberal
Riding dissolved into London East, London West and Middlesex

== Election results ==
1867 Canadian federal election
Party	Candidate	Votes
Liberal–Conservative	Crowell Willson	1,896
Independent	D. McFie	1,756
Eligible voters		2,539
Source: Canadian Parliamentary Guide, 1871

1872 Canadian federal election
Party	Candidate	Votes
Conservative	David Glass	1,890
Unknown	Mr. Evans	1,837

1874 Canadian federal election
Party	Candidate	Votes
Liberal–Conservative	Crowell Willson	1,977
Conservative	David Glass	1,933

On Mr. Willson being unseated on petition, 15 December 1874:

By-election on 28 January 1875
Party	Candidate	Votes
Liberal–Conservative	Duncan Macmillan	2,098
Unknown	James Armstrong	1,926

1878 Canadian federal election
Party	Candidate	Votes
Liberal–Conservative	Duncan Macmillan	2,428
Conservative	David Glass	2,332

1882 Canadian federal election
Party	Candidate	Votes
Liberal–Conservative	Duncan Macmillan	1,949
Unknown	Isaac Langford	1,454

1887 Canadian federal election
Party	Candidate	Votes
Conservative	Joseph Henry Marshall	2,624
Liberal	Robert Webster Jackson	1,865

1891 Canadian federal election
Party	Candidate	Votes
Conservative	Joseph Henry Marshall	2,369
Liberal	George Taylor	2,214

On election being declared void, 21 January 1892:

By-election on 11 February 1892
Party	Candidate	Votes
Conservative	Joseph Henry Marshall	acclaimed

1896 Canadian federal election
Party	Candidate	Votes
Conservative	James Gilmour	2,651
Liberal	John Gillson	2,227

1900 Canadian federal election
Party	Candidate	Votes
Conservative	James Gilmour	2,619
Liberal	John Gillson	1,899

1904 Canadian federal election
Party	Candidate	Votes
Conservative	Peter Elson	2,297
Liberal	John Millar McEvoy	2,078

1908 Canadian federal election
Party	Candidate	Votes
Conservative	Peter Elson	2,369
Liberal	George Albert Routledge	2,120

1911 Canadian federal election
Party	Candidate	Votes
Conservative	Peter Elson	2,477
Liberal	George Albert Routledge	1,816

On Mr. Elson's death, 11 June 1913:

By-election on 21 October 1913
Party	Candidate	Votes
Conservative	Samuel Francis Glass	2,068
Liberal	R. G. Fisher	1,683

1917 Canadian federal election
Party	Candidate	Votes
Government (Unionist)	Samuel Francis Glass	4,212
Opposition (Laurier Liberals)	James McCulloch Ross	2,755

1921 Canadian federal election
Party	Candidate	Votes
Progressive	Archie Latimer Hodgins	4,414
Conservative	Samuel Francis Glass	3,618
Liberal	Duncan Graham Ross	2,648

1925 Canadian federal election
Party	Candidate	Votes
Conservative	Adam King Hodgins	5,220
Liberal	Cecil Clarkson Ross	3,155
Progressive	Archie Latimer Hodgins	2,518

1926 Canadian federal election
Party	Candidate	Votes
Conservative	Adam King Hodgins	5,701
Progressive	John Willard Freeborn	2,897
Liberal	Cecil Clarkson Ross	2,506

1930 Canadian federal election
Party	Candidate	Votes
Conservative	Frank Boyes	7,909
Liberal	Duncan Graham Ross	6,231

1935 Canadian federal election
Party	Candidate	Votes
Liberal	Duncan Graham Ross	7,151
Conservative	Frank Boyes	5,602
Reconstruction	Orville Chester Hughes	1,827
Co-operative Commonwealth	William James Mahon	1,306

1940 Canadian federal election
Party	Candidate	Votes
Liberal	Duncan Graham Ross	8,444
National Government	Frederick George Fuller	6,256
Co-operative Commonwealth	Kenneth Elson Dickie	1,577

1945 Canadian federal election
Party	Candidate	Votes
Progressive Conservative	Harry Oliver White	8,808
Liberal	Duncan Graham Ross	7,442
Co-operative Commonwealth	Kenneth Elson Dickie	2,398

1949 Canadian federal election
Party	Candidate	Votes
Progressive Conservative	Harry Oliver White	9,258
Liberal	Fred O. Kime	9,198
Co-operative Commonwealth	Miller Stewart	2,848

1953 Canadian federal election
Party	Candidate	Votes
Progressive Conservative	Harry Oliver White	12,027
Liberal	Frank Duncan McLachlin	8,952
Co-operative Commonwealth	Alec Richmond	3,137

1957 Canadian federal election
Party	Candidate	Votes
Progressive Conservative	Harry Oliver White	20,287
Liberal	Fred O. Kime	9,323
Co-operative Commonwealth	James Johnson	3,242

1958 Canadian federal election
Party	Candidate	Votes
Progressive Conservative	Harry Oliver White	24,896
Liberal	Harry Roe Plewes	7,849
Co-operative Commonwealth	Andrew Grant	3,125

1962 Canadian federal election
Party	Candidate	Votes
Progressive Conservative	Campbell Millar	19,003
Liberal	James D. Green	13,231
New Democratic	Harry L. Sills	7,246
Social Credit	Rae J. Watson	992

1963 Canadian federal election
Party	Candidate	Votes
Progressive Conservative	Campbell Millar	19,850
Liberal	Jim Lind	18,043
New Democratic	John G. Gelleta	5,092
Social Credit	Rae J. Watson	1,159

1965 Canadian federal election
Party	Candidate	Votes
Liberal	Jim Lind	17,675
Progressive Conservative	Campbell Millar	15,859
New Democratic	Kenneth Bolton	13,073
Social Credit	James A. Watson	392

== See also ==
- List of Canadian electoral districts
- Historical federal electoral districts of Canada
