= David Glass (Canadian politician) =

Canadian politician

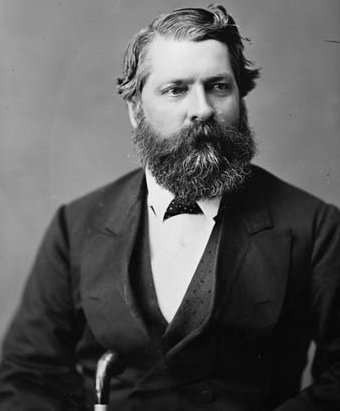

Member of the Canadian Parliament for Middlesex East
- In office 1872–1874
- Preceded by: Crowell Willson
- Succeeded by: Crowell Willson

Member of the Legislative Assembly of Manitoba for St. Clements
- In office 1886–1888
- Preceded by: John Allen
- Succeeded by: Donald A. Ross

7th Speaker of the Legislative Assembly of Manitoba
- In office April 14, 1887 – June 1888
- Preceded by: Alexander Murray
- Succeeded by: William Winram

Personal details
- Born: July 20, 1829 Westminster Township, Middlesex County, Upper Canada
- Died: July 17, 1906 (aged 76) Spokane, Washington, United States
- Party: Independent-Conservative / Conservative Party of Canada
- Profession: lawyer

David Glass (July 20, 1829 – July 17, 1906) was a Canadian lawyer and political figure. He was a Conservative Member of Parliament representing Middlesex East from 1872 to 1874.

He was born in Westminster Township, Middlesex County, Upper Canada in 1829, the son of Samuel Glass, who had come to Upper Canada from Ireland in 1819, and Eliza Owrey. In 1856, he married Sarah Dalton. Glass was called to the bar in 1864 and set up practice in London. He served on London City Council and was mayor in 1858 and 1865–1866. In 1876, he was named Queen's Counsel. He moved to Winnipeg in 1882, was called to the Manitoba bar later that year and was elected to the Legislative Assembly of Manitoba for St. Clements in 1886, serving from 1887 to 1888; he was also Speaker of the Legislative Assembly from 1887 to 1888. He retired from politics in 1888 due to poor health. Glass was solicitor for the city of Winnipeg. He was also master of the local Masonic lodge and a member of the Grand Lodge of Canada.

He later lived in Rossland, British Columbia and Spokane, Washington, where he died in 1906. Glass was buried at Mount Pleasant Cemetery in London, Ontario.

== Electoral record ==
1867 Canadian federal election: Bothwell
Party	Candidate	Votes
Liberal	David Mills	1,333
Conservative	David Glass	1,224
Source: Canadian Elections Database

1872 Canadian federal election: Middlesex East
Party	Candidate	Votes
Conservative	David Glass	1,890
Unknown	Mr. Evans	1,837

1874 Canadian federal election: Middlesex East
Party	Candidate	Votes
Liberal–Conservative	Crowell Willson	1,977
Conservative	David Glass	1,933

1878 Canadian federal election: Middlesex East
Party	Candidate	Votes
Liberal–Conservative	Duncan Macmillan	2,428
Conservative	David Glass	2,332
