= James Armstrong (Ontario politician) =

Canadian politician

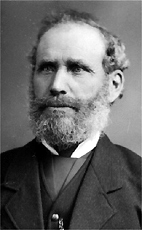

Member of Parliament for Middlesex South
- In office 1882–1893
- Preceded by: riding created from parts of Middlesex East and Middlesex West
- Succeeded by: Robert Boston

Personal details
- Born: March 1, 1830 Queensbury, New Brunswick
- Died: January 26, 1893 (aged 62)
- Party: Liberal, Unknown
- Profession: farmer

James Armstrong (March 1, 1830, in Queensbury, New Brunswick – January 26, 1893) was a Canadian politician and farmer. He ran in a federal by-election in 1875 in the riding of Middlesex East and lost. He was elected in 1882 as a member of the Liberal Party representing the riding of Middlesex South. He was re-elected in 1887 and 1891. Armstrong died in office at the age of 62.

== Biography ==
He was the son of Thomas Armstrong and Agnes Murray, both immigrants from Roxburghshire, Scotland, and was educated in Middlesex County, Upper Canada. Armstrong was married twice: to Jane Fraser in 1858 and to Annie McCall in 1873. He was president of the London Mutual Fire Insurance Company and a director of the Canadian Saving and Loan Company. He was also a superintendent of schools, township clerk, reeve for Westminster Township and warden for Middlesex County.

By-election on 28 January 1875
Party	Candidate	Votes
Liberal–Conservative	Duncan Macmillan	2,098
Unknown	James Armstrong	1,926
