= Robert Boston =

Robert Boston may refer to:

- Rob Boston (born 1962), Assistant Director of Communications at Americans United for Separation of Church and State
- Robert Boston (politician) (1836–1922), Canadian politician
- Bob Boston (1918–2002), American baseball player
