= Koston =

Koston is a surname. Notable people with the surname include:

- Dina Koston (1929?–2009), American pianist, music educator, and composer
- Eric Koston (born 1975), American professional skateboarder and company owner

== See also ==
- Boston (surname)
- Roston (surname)
