= Peter Elson (politician) =

Canadian politician

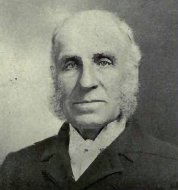

Member of the Canadian Parliament for Middlesex East
- In office 1904–1913
- Preceded by: James Gilmour
- Succeeded by: Samuel Francis Glass

Personal details
- Born: January 18, 1839 London Township, Canada West
- Died: June 11, 1913 (aged 74)
- Party: Conservative

Peter Elson (January 18, 1839 – June 11, 1913) was a Canadian politician.

Born in the township of London, County of Middlesex, Upper Canada, the son of Joseph and Samantha Elson, Elson was educated at the schools of Middlesex and Hamilton. A farmer, he was deputy reeve of London township for two years, reeve for eight years, county councillor for 18 years, and warden of Middlesex County for one year. He was first elected to the House of Commons of Canada for Middlesex East in the general elections of 1904. A conservative, he was re-elected in 1908 and 1911. He died in office in 1913.
