= Archie Latimer Hodgins =

Canadian politician

Member of Parliament for Middlesex East
- In office December 1921 – September 1925
- Preceded by: Samuel Francis Glass
- Succeeded by: Adam King Hodgins

Personal details
- Born: Archie Latimer Hodgins; 19 June 1876 Ettrick, Ontario, Canada
- Died: 4 July 1966 (aged 90)
- Party: Progressive
- Profession: farmer

Archie Latimer Hodgins (19 June 1876 – 4 July 1966) was a Canadian farmer and politician. Hodgins was a Progressive party member of the House of Commons of Canada. He was born in Ettrick, Ontario.

He was elected to Parliament at the Middlesex East riding in the 1921 general election. After serving his only federal term, the 14th Canadian Parliament, Hodgins was defeated by Adam King Hodgins of the Conservatives in the 1925 federal election.

1921 Canadian federal election: Middlesex East
Party	Candidate	Votes
Progressive	Archie Latimer Hodgins	4,414
Conservative	Samuel Francis Glass	3,618
Liberal	Duncan Graham Ross	2,648

1925 Canadian federal election: Middlesex East
Party	Candidate	Votes
Conservative	Adam King Hodgins	5,220
Liberal	Cecil Clarkson Ross	3,155
Progressive	Archie Latimer Hodgins	2,518
