= James Gilmour (politician) =

Canadian politician (1842–1908)

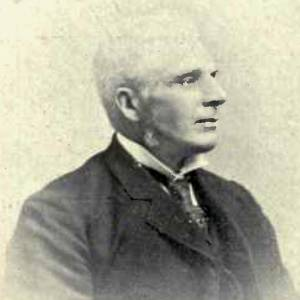
James Gilmour

James Gilmour (January 20, 1842 – May 15, 1908) was a Scottish-born farmer and political figure in Ontario, Canada. He represented Middlesex East in the House of Commons of Canada from 1896 to 1904 as a Conservative.

He was born in South Hillhead, Renfrewshire and was educated there. In 1871, he married Elizabeth McClary. He was warden for Middlesex County in 1879 and also served as a trustee for London County General Hospital. Gilmour was reeve of North Dorchester Township for 15 years.

1896 Canadian federal election: Middlesex East
Party	Candidate	Votes
Conservative	James Gilmour	2,651
Liberal	John Gillson	2,227

1900 Canadian federal election: Middlesex East
Party	Candidate	Votes
Conservative	James Gilmour	2,619
Liberal	John Gillson	1,899
