= Middlesex South (federal electoral district) =

Former federal electoral district in Ontario, Canada

Coordinates: 42.9°N 81.5°W

Middlesex South was a federal electoral district that was represented in the House of Commons of Canada from 1883 to 1904. It was located in the province of Ontario. This riding was created from parts of Middlesex East and Middlesex West ridings.

It consisted of the townships of Westminster, Delaware, Caradoc and Lobo.

The electoral district was abolished in 1903 when it was redistributed between Middlesex North, Middlesex East and Middlesex West ridings.

== Electoral history ==
1882 Canadian federal election
Party	Candidate	Votes
Liberal	ARMSTRONG, James	1,678
Unknown	RAYNER, John	812

1887 Canadian federal election
Party	Candidate	Votes
Liberal	ARMSTRONG, James	1,782
Conservative	GAMBLE, H.	1,368

1891 Canadian federal election
Party	Candidate	Votes
Liberal	ARMSTRONG, James	1,906
Conservative	CHISHOLM, Andrew G.	1,282

On Mr. Armstrong's death, 26 January 1893:

By-election on 22 March 1893
Party	Candidate	Votes
Liberal	BOSTON, Robert	acclaimed

1896 Canadian federal election
Party	Candidate	Votes
Liberal	MCGUGAN, Malcolm	2,035
Conservative	ELLIOTT, H.B.	1,295

1900 Canadian federal election
Party	Candidate	Votes
Liberal	MCGUGAN, Malcolm	2,020
Conservative	JUDD, Joseph Coulson	1,264

== See also ==
- List of Canadian electoral districts
- Historical federal electoral districts of Canada
