= Joseph Henry Marshall =

Canadian politician

Joseph Henry Marshall (1854 – June 6, 1919) was a farmer and political figure in Ontario, Canada. He represented Middlesex East in the House of Commons of Canada from 1887 to 1896 as a Conservative member.

He was born in London, Canada West; his parents were natives of England who had come to Canada from County Longford, Ireland. Marshall was educated in London. He married Amy Crump. Marshall served as reeve for London Township from 1882 to 1883 and warden for Middlesex County in 1882. His election in 1891 was declared void but he won the subsequent by-election held in 1892.
