= Nelson Elliott =

Canadian politician

Member of Parliament for London—Middlesex
- In office May 22, 1979 – February 17, 1980
- Preceded by: none
- Succeeded by: Garnet Bloomfield

Personal details
- Born: 6 August 1925 Belton, Ontario, Canada
- Died: 1 April 2017 (aged 91) North Bay, Ontario, Canada
- Party: Progressive Conservative
- Spouse: Lucy Goarley
- Profession: farmer

Nelson Pearce Elliott (6 August 1925 – 1 April 2017) was a Progressive Conservative party member of the House of Commons of Canada. He was a farmer by career.

He represented the London—Middlesex electoral district which he won in the 1979 federal election. After serving one term, the 31st Canadian Parliament, Elliott left national politics in 1980 and did not campaign in that year's election.
