= Jim Lind (politician) =

Canadian politician

James (Jim) Gordon Lind
- Official 1968 portrait

Member of Parliament for Middlesex East
- In office November 1965 – June 1968
- Preceded by: Campbell Millar
- Succeeded by: riding dissolved

Member of Parliament for Middlesex
- In office June 1968 – September 1972
- Preceded by: first member
- Succeeded by: Bill Frank

Personal details
- Born: 8 March 1913 Westminster Township, Ontario, Canada
- Died: 22 April 1980 (aged 67)
- Party: Liberal
- Profession: lumber merchant

James Gordon Lind (8 March 1913 – 22 April 1980) was a Liberal party member of the House of Commons of Canada. He was born in Westminster Township, Ontario and became a lumber merchant by career.

Jim Lind was first elected at the Middlesex East riding in the 1965 general election, after a previous unsuccessful campaign in that riding in the 1963 election. He was re-elected to Parliament in the 1968 election at Middlesex riding. After completing his final term in the 28th Canadian Parliament, Lind left the House of Commons and did not seek further re-election.

1963 Canadian federal election: Middlesex East
Party	Candidate	Votes
Progressive Conservative	Campbell Millar	19,850
Liberal	Jim Lind	18,043
New Democratic	John G. Gelleta	5,092
Social Credit	Rae J. Watson	1,159

1965 Canadian federal election: Middlesex East
Party	Candidate	Votes
Liberal	Jim Lind	17,675
Progressive Conservative	Campbell Millar	15,859
New Democratic	Kenneth Bolton	13,073
Social Credit	James A. Watson	392
