= Adam King Hodgins =

Canadian politician

Member of Parliament for Middlesex East
- In office October 1925 – May 1930
- Preceded by: Archie Latimer Hodgins
- Succeeded by: Frank Boyes

Personal details
- Born: Adam King Hodgins; 1 November 1859 Lucan, Canada West
- Died: 15 May 1932 (aged 72)
- Party: Conservative
- Spouse(s): 1) Ellen Isaac (died); 2) Park m. 1925
- Profession: Automobile dealer, farmer

Adam King Hodgins (1 November 1859 – 15 May 1932) was a Canadian businessman and politician. Hodgins was a Conservative member of the House of Commons of Canada. He was born in Lucan, Canada West and became an automobile dealer and farmer.

From 1908 to 1912, Hodgins served as a reeve of Biddulph Township, Ontario. In 1912, he was a warden for Middlesex County, Ontario.

He was first elected to Parliament at the Middlesex East riding in the 1925 general election and re-elected there in the 1926 election. After completing two terms in the House of Commons, Hodgins left federal politics and did not seek re-election in the 1930 vote.

1925 Canadian federal election: Middlesex East
Party	Candidate	Votes
Conservative	Adam King Hodgins	5,220
Liberal	Cecil Clarkson Ross	3,155
Progressive	Archie Latimer Hodgins	2,518

1926 Canadian federal election: Middlesex East
Party	Candidate	Votes
Conservative	Adam King Hodgins	5,701
Progressive	John Willard Freeborn	2,897
Liberal	Cecil Clarkson Ross	2,506
