= Frank Boyes =

Canadian politician

Member of the Canadian Parliament for Middlesex East
- In office 1930–1935
- Preceded by: Adam King Hodgins
- Succeeded by: Duncan Graham Ross

Personal details
- Born: January 29, 1874 South Dorchester, Ontario, Canada
- Died: May 28, 1961 (aged 87)
- Party: Conservative Party
- Occupation: cheese maker

Frank Boyes (January 29, 1874 in South Dorchester, Ontario, Canada – May 28, 1961) was a Canadian politician and cheese maker. He was elected to the House of Commons of Canada as a Member of the Conservative Party in 1930 to represent the riding of Middlesex East. He was defeated in the 1935 election. He also served for three years as reeve of North Dorchester, Ontario.

1930 Canadian federal election: Middlesex East
Party	Candidate	Votes
Conservative	Frank Boyes	7,909
Liberal	Duncan Graham Ross	6,231
