= Crowell Willson =

Canadian politician

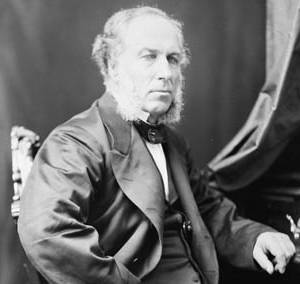
Crowell Willson Source: Library and Archives Canada

Crowell Willson (1815 – October 12, 1894) was a Canadian farmer and political figure. He represented Middlesex East in the House of Commons of Canada as a Liberal-Conservative member from 1867 to 1872 and in 1874.

He was born in St. Thomas, Upper Canada in 1815, the son of Benjamin Willson. In 1838, he settled in London Township and established a wool carding mill there. In 1851, he was elected to represent Middlesex in the Legislative Assembly of the Province of Canada; he was reelected in East Middlesex in 1863. He was elected to the federal parliament in 1867 and 1874 but, in 1874, he was unseated after his election was protested. Willson was also a director of the London Mutual Fire Insurance Company.

In 1843, Willson married Maria Jackson. He died in Wingham at the age of 79.

1867 Canadian federal election: Middlesex East
Party	Candidate	Votes
Liberal–Conservative	Crowell Willson	1,896
Independent	D. McFie	1,756
Eligible voters		2,539
Source: Canadian Parliamentary Guide, 1871

1874 Canadian federal election: Middlesex East
Party	Candidate	Votes
Liberal–Conservative	Crowell Willson	1,977
Conservative	David Glass	1,933

Parliament of Canada
Preceded by The electoral district was created by the British North America Act, 1867.	Member of Parliament for Middlesex East; 1867–1872	Succeeded by David Glass
Preceded by David Glass	Member of Parliament for Middlesex East; 1874	Succeeded by Duncan MacMillan
