= Campbell Millar =

Canadian politician

Campbell Ewing Millar

Member of Parliament for Middlesex East
- In office June 1962 – September 1965
- Preceded by: Harry Oliver White
- Succeeded by: Jim Lind

Personal details
- Born: 12 February 1911 Vancouver, British Columbia
- Died: 17 July 1991 (aged 80)
- Party: Progressive Conservative
- Profession: inspector

Campbell Ewing Millar (12 February 1911 – 17 July 1991) was a Progressive Conservative party member of the House of Commons of Canada. He was born in Vancouver, British Columbia, and became an inspector by career.

He was first elected at the Middlesex East riding in the 1962 general election, then re-elected there in 1963. In the 1965 election, Millar was defeated at Middlesex East by Jim Lind of the Liberal party.

1962 Canadian federal election: Middlesex East
| Party | Candidate | Votes |
|---|---|---|
| Progressive Conservative | Campbell Millar | 19,003 |
| Liberal | James D. Green | 13,231 |
| New Democratic | Harry L. Sills | 7,246 |
| Social Credit | Rae J. Watson | 992 |

1963 Canadian federal election: Middlesex East
| Party | Candidate | Votes |
|---|---|---|
| Progressive Conservative | Campbell Millar | 19,850 |
| Liberal | Jim Lind | 18,043 |
| New Democratic | John G. Gelleta | 5,092 |
| Social Credit | Rae J. Watson | 1,159 |

1965 Canadian federal election: Middlesex East
| Party | Candidate | Votes |
|---|---|---|
| Liberal | Jim Lind | 17,675 |
| Progressive Conservative | Campbell Millar | 15,859 |
| New Democratic | Kenneth Bolton | 13,073 |
| Social Credit | James A. Watson | 392 |
