= Samuel Francis Glass =

Canadian politician

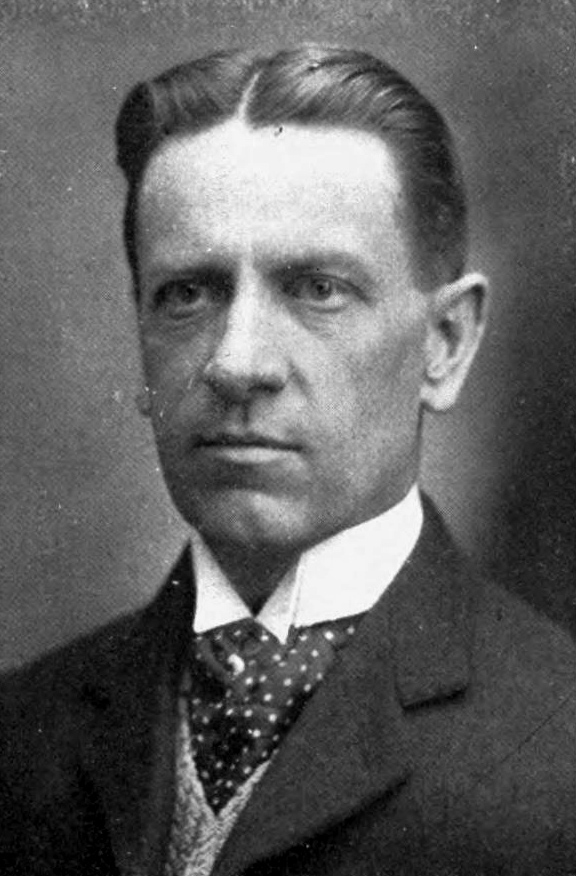
Glass in an undated photograph

Samuel Francis Glass (January 8, 1861 – April 6, 1925) was an insurance and real estate agent and political figure in Ontario, Canada. He represented Middlesex East in the House of Commons of Canada from 1913 to 1921 as a Conservative.

He was born in London Township, Canada West, the son of William Glass and Phoebe Guernsey, and was educated in London and Brantford. In 1881, Glass married Josephine F. Dickson. He lived in London, Ontario. He was a director of the London and Port Stanley Railway. Glass was first elected to the House of Commons in a 1913 by-election held following the death of Peter Elson. From 1917 to 1921, he was a member of the Unionist Party. Glass was defeated when he ran for reelection in 1921. He died in London four years later at the age of 64.

1917 Canadian federal election: Middlesex East
Party	Candidate	Votes
Government (Unionist)	Samuel Francis Glass	4,212
Opposition (Laurier Liberals)	James McCulloch Ross	2,755

1921 Canadian federal election: Middlesex East
Party	Candidate	Votes
Progressive	Archie Latimer Hodgins	4,414
Conservative	Samuel Francis Glass	3,618
Liberal	Duncan Graham Ross	2,648
