= Lambeth, Ontario =

Lambeth, Ontario may refer to:

- Lambeth, Middlesex County, Ontario, a neighbourhood in the City of London, Ontario, Canada
- Lambeth, Oxford County, Ontario, a municipality in Canada
