= 1976 Ontario Liberal Party leadership election =

Canadian provincial party election

- Date: January 24–25, 1976
- Convention: Four Seasons Sheraton Hotel, Toronto, Ontario
- Resigning leader: Robert Nixon
- Won by: Stuart Smith
- Ballots: 3
- Candidates: 6 (7)

The Ontario Liberal Party held a leadership election in 1976 on January 24–25 to replace Robert Nixon. Nixon had announced his retirement after the 1975 election in which the Liberal Party was reduced from Official Opposition status in the Legislative Assembly of Ontario to being the third party. Stuart Smith was elected as the party's new leader.

== Background ==
After the disappointing results of the 1975 provincial election, Robert Nixon announced his resignation on September 30, 1975. He said, "the best interests of our party will be served if we contest the next election under new leadership."

Potential candidates began announcing their candidacy soon after. First to announce was Larry Condon, a member of the federal parliament (MP) from Middlesex—London—Lambton. Condon, who had served as mayor of Strathroy, Ontario, said that he empathized with the working man and would seek grassroots support. Next to join the campaign was Edward Culp, a Toronto teacher who had also run in the 1973 Liberal leadership election. Culp told reporters that he had "earned the right to be treated as a serious candidate". He described himself as a "left-nationalist". He was the first to drop out of the race in early January 1976. Third to announce on November 11 was Michael Houlton, another fringe candidate from the 1973 race. Houlton, who worked in advertising, decided to try again although his main goal seemed to be to promote his advertising business.

On November 14, the first serious candidate to enter the race was Stuart Smith, a 37-year-old Montreal-born psychiatrist. Smith, who was elected as a Member of Provincial Parliament (MPP) in Hamilton West in 1975, was well-spoken and articulate. Provincial Liberals thought that Smith reminded them of Pierre Trudeau. David Peterson announced his candidacy on December 12, but he had been campaigning for at least a month before that. The 31-year-old businessman who had been elected in London Centre in 1975 said that he had support from ten caucus members, including Edward Sargent, John Riddell and Sean Conway. Rounding out the candidates were Mark MacGuigan, a 44-year-old federal MP from Windsor, and Albert Roy, a 36-year-old MPP from Ottawa.

Other people whose names were cited as possible candidates were MPPs Patrick Reid, Jim Bullbrook, Jim Breithaupt and MPs Norman Cafik, John Roberts, and Anthony Abbott. Some Liberals including Donald Deacon tried to recruit former federal finance minister John Turner for the leadership election, but he declined.

Peterson spent the most money on his campaign at $54,415, followed by Roy at $50,000, MacGuigan at $40,000. Smith spent the least at $29,866.

== Convention ==
On January 23, 1976, about 2,000 Liberal delegates gathered at the Royal York Hotel to give Nixon a rousing tribute. Nixon, who refused to give any of the four main contenders an endorsement, said he would remain in the Legislature as a regular member. The speeches took place on a Saturday. Although no one stood out, Peterson's speech was seen as stilted and over rehearsed. He later characterized it as the "worst speech in modern political history". After the first ballot, Smith was in the lead, followed by Peterson, Roy, and MacGuigan. MacGuigan elected to drop out after the first ballot even though he could have stayed for another round. He refused to make any endorsements. After the second ballot, Roy was dropped. Peterson's team tried hard to get him to endorse their candidate, but their push appeared to irritate Roy and he refused to make any endorsement. On the third ballot, Smith narrowly won by 45 votes.

During the convention, there was not much difference in policy between the candidates. Some delegates felt that Peterson was too young to be leader, and others were dissuaded because he reminded them of current Tory Premier, Bill Davis. Smith presented a different style that provided a marked contrast from Peterson. He won on his "intellectual qualities" and urban appeal. Smith presented himself as the party's chance for power. He said, "the delegates are going to ask, 'Could he run this province? He's got long hair, he's a shrink, he's Jewish, and he's from Quebec.' ... Well, you know, trying something different can be the highlight of a person's life."

== Aftermath ==
Smith's competence as leader was soon tested in the Legislature. In his first session, during the Speech from the Throne, the Ontario New Democratic Party (NDP) made a motion condemning the government's position. Smith, without consulting his party, made a sub-amendment to the NDP motion which also condemned the government in much the same language. Since this was a minority government, it would have brought down the government. Smith was pilloried in the house the next day which was exacerbated due to the fact that he was out of town for another engagement. In the end the NDP and the Liberals defeated the government 70 to 48 on the Liberal amendment but then the Liberals voted with the Tories to defeat the similar NDP amendment. Smith tried to save face by stating "We voted for our own amendment to register disapproval with government policy. We voted against the NDP amendment simply to avoid an election."

The Liberals under Smith regained status as official opposition after the 1977 election in another minority parliament but suffered disappointment in 1981 when the Tories regained a majority. Smith resigned after his second election defeat after six years as leader.

== Ballot results ==
Delegate support by ballot
| Candidate | 1st ballot | | 2nd ballot | | 3rd ballot | |
|---|---|---|---|---|---|---|
| Name | Votes cast | % | Votes cast | % | Votes cast | % |
| Stuart Smith | 629 | 32.0 | 742 | 38.5 | 998 | 51.2 |
| David Peterson | 518 | 26.4 | 673 | 34.9 | 953 | 48.8 |
| Albert Roy | 469 | 23.9 | 513 | 26.6 | No endorsement | |
| Mark MacGuigan | 308 | 15.7 | No endorsement | | | |
| Larry Condon | 37 | 1.9 | No endorsement | | | |
| Michael Houlton | 4 | 0.2 | No endorsement | | | |
| Total | 1,965 | 100.0 | 1,928 | 100.0 | 1,951 | 100.0 |
