= Lindsay Mathyssen =

Canadian politician

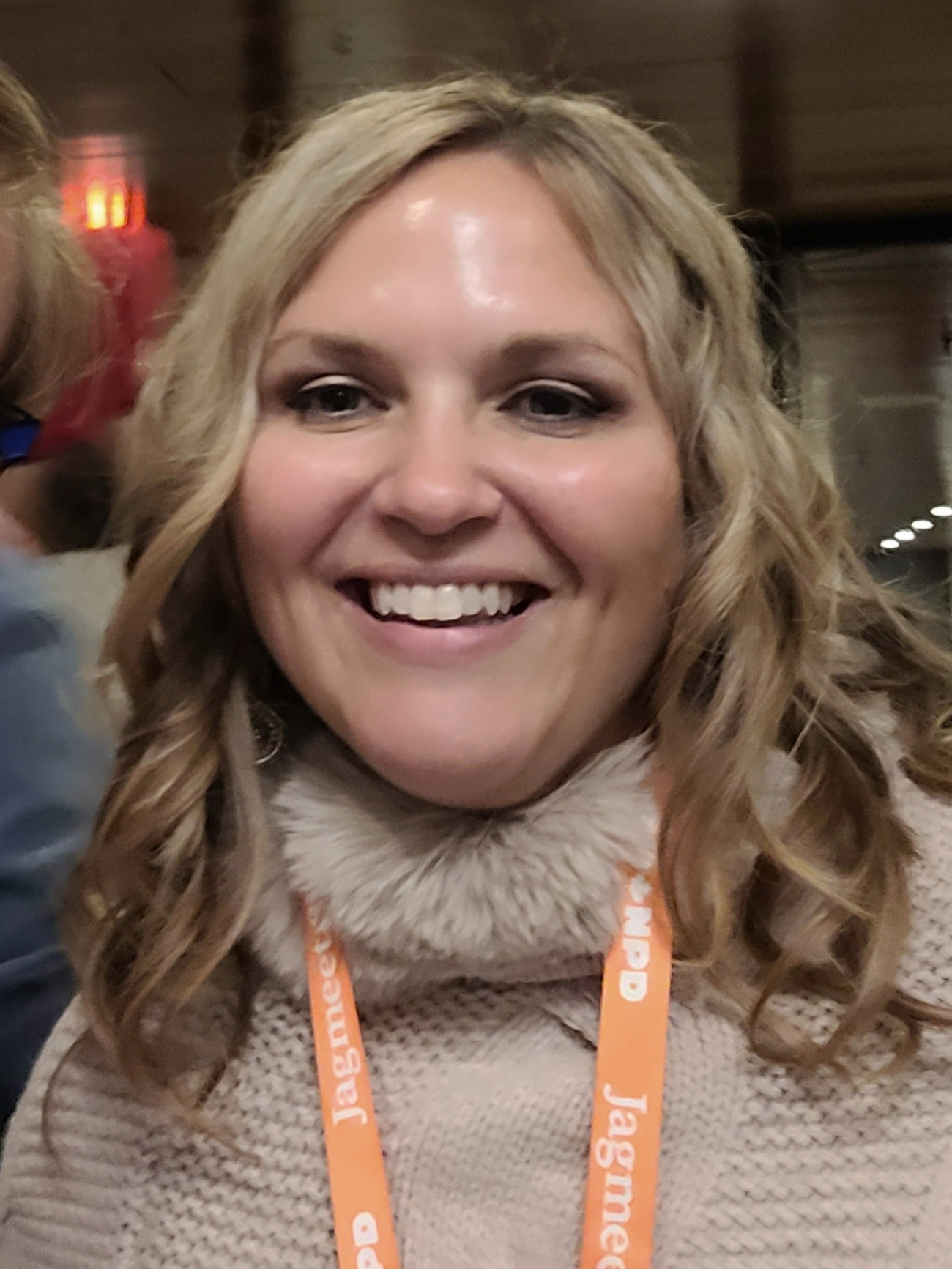

Member of Parliament for London—Fanshawe
- In office October 21, 2019 – March 23, 2025
- Preceded by: Irene Mathyssen
- Succeeded by: Kurt Holman

Personal details
- Born: 1978 or 1979 (age 47–48)
- Party: New Democratic Party
- Parent: Irene Mathyssen (mother)

Lindsay Mathyssen is a Canadian politician who served as the member of Parliament for the riding of London—Fanshawe in the House of Commons of Canada from 2019 to 2025 as a member of the New Democratic Party (NDP). She is the daughter of Irene Mathyssen, whom she succeeded in office.

== Background ==
Mathyssen graduated from Medway High School and earned a bachelor's degree in English and political science from Queen's University in 2001. She later studied non-profit management at the University of Western Ontario.

Before entering federal politics, Mathyssen held clerical positions with several private-sector employers, including London Life and Staples. In 2002, she began working with the New Democratic Party (NDP) in various capacities and, over 11 years, she served as an NDP staffer to four different members of Parliament.

== Political career ==
Mathyssen was acclaimed as the NDP candidate for the riding of London—Fanshawe on November 4, 2018, succeeding her mother, Irene Mathyssen, who had represented the riding since 2006. Prior to this, Mathyssen had sought the NDP nomination in the neighbouring riding of London North Centre ahead of the 2015 federal election but was defeated by German Gutierrez.

In the 2019 federal election, Mathyssen was elected member of Parliament for London—Fanshawe. She was re-elected in the 2021 election. During her time in office, Mathyssen held various parliamentary roles, including Deputy House Leader of the NDP.

Her tenure ended in the 2025 federal election, when she was defeated by Conservative candidate Kurt Holman, bringing an end to the Mathyssen family's 19-year representation of the riding.

Mathyssen endorsed Alberta MP Heather McPherson in the 2026 New Democratic Party leadership election.

== Electoral record ==
2025 Canadian federal election: London—Fanshawe
Party	Candidate	Votes	%	±%	Expenditures
Conservative	Kurt Holman	23,749	40.58	+16.31	$55,491.76
Liberal	Najam Naqvi	17,863	30.52	+7.47	$62,403.28
New Democratic	Lindsay Mathyssen	16,135	27.57	–15.93	$120,496.50
People's	Daniel Buta	776	1.33	–7.85	$0.00
Total valid votes/expense limit		58,523	98.99	–	$138,363.98
Total rejected ballots		596	1.01		
Turnout		59,119	63.33		
Eligible voters		93,354			
Conservative notional gain from New Democratic		Swing		+4.47	
Source: CBC, Elections Canada

2021 Canadian federal election: London—Fanshawe
Party	Candidate	Votes	%	±%	Expenditures
New Democratic	Lindsay Mathyssen	22,336	43.44	+2.65	$87,156.27
Conservative	Mattias Vanderley	12,486	24.28	-0.50	$27,879.92
Liberal	Mohamed Hammoud	11,882	23.11	-3.74	$34,106.52
People's	Kyle Free	4,718	9.18	+7.14	$6,247.35
Total valid votes/expense limit		51,422	99.02	-0.06	$120,013.52
Total rejected ballots		511	0.98	+0.06	
Turnout		51,933	56.62	-3.09	
Eligible voters		91,727			
New Democratic hold		Swing		+1.58	
Source: Elections Canada

2019 Canadian federal election: London—Fanshawe
Party	Candidate	Votes	%	±%	Expenditures
New Democratic	Lindsay Mathyssen	22,671	40.79	+3.01	$87,107.75
Liberal	Mohamed Hammoud	14,924	26.85	-4.59	$87,821.00
Conservative	Michael van Holst	13,770	24.78	-2.42	$45,864.85
Green	Tom Cull	2,781	5.00	+2.07	$6,691.69
People's	Bela Kosoian	1,132	2.04		$2,704.60
Independent	Stephen Campbell	297	0.53		none listed
Total valid votes/expense limit		55,575	99.08		
Total rejected ballots		518	0.92	+0.41	
Turnout		56,093	59.71	-3.33	
Eligible voters		93,944			
New Democratic hold		Swing		+3.80	
Source: Elections Canada
