= Middlesex (federal electoral district) =

Former federal electoral district in Ontario, Canada

Ontario electoral district

Defunct federal electoral district
- Legislature: House of Commons
- District created: 1966
- District abolished: 1976
- First contested: 1968
- Last contested: 1974

Middlesex (also known as Middlesex—London—Lambton) was a federal electoral district represented in the House of Commons of Canada from 1968 to 1979. It was located in the province of Ontario. This riding was created in 1966 from parts of Lambton West, Lambton—Kent, Middlesex West and Middlesex East ridings.

It consisted of: (a) the north-central part of the City of London bounded by Adelaide Street on the west, Clarke Side Road on the east by, and Cheapside Street on the south;

(b) in the County of Middlesex, the Townships of Adelaide, Caradoc, Delaware, Ekfrid, Lobo, Metcalfe, Mosa, West Nissouri and West Williams, Westminster, North Dorchester (excluding the Village of Belmont), East Williams (excluding the Village of Ailsa Craig), and the Township of London (excluding the part of the Township lying south of the Fanshawe Road and bounded on the east by Crumlin Road and on the west by Clarke Side Road); and

(c) in the County of Lambton, the Town of Forest and the Townships of Bosanquet and Warwick.

The electoral district changed name in 1974 to "Middlesex—London—Lambton", and was abolished in 1976 when it was redistributed between Lambton—Middlesex, London East and Middlesex East ridings.

== Members of Parliament ==
This riding has elected the following members of Parliament:

Parliament	Years	Member	Party
Middlesex; Riding created from Middlesex East, Middlesex West, Lambton West and Lambton—Kent
28th	1968–1972	Jim Lind	Liberal
29th	1972–1974	William Frank	Progressive Conservative
Middlesex—London—Lambton
30th	1974–1979	Larry Condon	Liberal
Riding dissolved into Middlesex East, Lambton—Middlesex and London East

== Election results ==
=== Middlesex ===
1968 Canadian federal election
Party	Candidate	Votes	%	±%
Liberal	Jim Lind	15,986	45.7%	
Progressive Conservative	Bill Frank	15,284	43.6%	
New Democratic	Peter A. Weber	3,743	10.7%	

1972 Canadian federal election
Party	Candidate	Votes	%	±%
Progressive Conservative	Bill Frank	20,615	46.3%	+2.7%
Liberal	Marvin Recker	17,244	38.8%	-6.9%
New Democratic	Ray Funk	6,643	14.9%	+4.2%

=== Middlesex—London—Lambton ===
1974 Canadian federal election
Party	Candidate	Votes	%	±%
Liberal	Larry Condon	20,703	46.9%	+8.1%
Progressive Conservative	Bill Frank	17,905	40.5%	-5.8%
New Democratic	Leroy Wright	5,382	12.2%	-2.7%
Independent	Mary Campbell	180	0.4%	+0.4%

== See also ==
- List of Canadian electoral districts
- Historical federal electoral districts of Canada
