= Raston =

Raston is a surname. Notable people with the surname include:

- Colin Raston (born 1950), Australian academic
- Willie Raston (born 1984), New Zealand former professional rugby league footballer
- Dina Temple-Raston (born 1965), American journalist

== See also ==
- Raston Warrior Robot in Doctor Who
- Ralston (surname)
- Roston (surname)
