= Jim Jepson =

Canadian politician

Member of Parliament for London East
- In office 4 September 1984 – 20 November 1988
- Preceded by: Charles Turner
- Succeeded by: Joe Fontana

Personal details
- Born: James Kenneth Jepson; 8 April 1942 Hamilton, Ontario, Canada
- Died: 29 November 1989 (aged 47) London, Ontario, Canada
- Party: Progressive Conservative
- Spouse: Beverly Susan Fritz
- Children: 3

James Kenneth Jepson (8 April 1942 – 29 November 1989) was a Progressive Conservative party member of the House of Commons of Canada. He was born in Hamilton, Ontario and became a businessman by career.

He was elected at the London East electoral district in the 1984 federal election, thus he served in the 33rd Canadian Parliament. Jepson was defeated in London East in the 1988 federal election by Joe Fontana of the Liberal party. Barely a year after this very narrow loss, Jepson died aged 47 of heart failure.
