= Charles Turner (Canadian politician) =

Canadian politician (1916–1993)

The Honourable Charles Turner

Canadian Senator from Ontario
- In office 9 July 1984 – 24 March 1991
- Appointed by: John Turner

Member of Parliament for London East
- In office 25 June 1968 – 9 July 1984
- Preceded by: Electoral District created
- Succeeded by: Jim Jepson

Personal details
- Born: 24 March 1916 Toronto, Ontario, Canada
- Died: 10 January 1993 (aged 76)
- Party: Liberal Party of Canada

Charles Robert Turner (24 March 1916 – 10 January 1993) was a Liberal party member of the House of Commons of Canada and later became a member of the Senate of Canada. Born in Toronto, Ontario, he became a locomotive engineer by career.

== Background ==
Turner represented the Ontario riding of London East at which he was elected in 1968 and re-elected in 1972, 1974, 1979 and 1980. During his terms in the House of Commons, Turner served as a Parliamentary Secretary, as Deputy Chairman of the Committee of the Whole (an Assistant Deputy Speaker) and finally as Chief Government Whip from 1980 to 1984.

After serving five successive terms from the 28th to 32nd Canadian Parliaments, he was appointed to the Senate in 1984 as recommended by Prime Minister John Turner.
