= Harry Oliver White =

Canadian politician

Member of Parliament for Middlesex East
- In office June 1945 – April 1962

Personal details
- Born: 6 January 1895 Glanworth, Ontario, Canada
- Died: 4 September 1987 (aged 92)
- Party: Progressive Conservative
- Spouse(s): Dollie Pearl Page Tye m. 14 Feb 1923
- Profession: farmer

Harry Oliver White (6 January 1895 – 4 September 1987) was a Progressive Conservative party member of the House of Commons of Canada. He was born in Glanworth, Ontario and became a farmer by career. White served in World War I with the 63rd Field Battery, Canadian Expeditionary Force.

He won five consecutive elections at the Middlesex East riding from the 1945 federal election through the 1958 election. After completing his fifth term, the 24th Canadian Parliament, White left federal politics and did not seek another term in office.

He died in 1987 and is interred in Westminster, Ontario.

1945 Canadian federal election: Middlesex East
Party	Candidate	Votes
Progressive Conservative	Harry Oliver White	8,808
Liberal	Duncan Graham Ross	7,442
Co-operative Commonwealth	Kenneth Elson Dickie	2,398

1949 Canadian federal election: Middlesex East
Party	Candidate	Votes
Progressive Conservative	Harry Oliver White	9,258
Liberal	Fred O. Kime	9,198
Co-operative Commonwealth	Miller Stewart	2,848

1953 Canadian federal election: Middlesex East
Party	Candidate	Votes
Progressive Conservative	Harry Oliver White	12,027
Liberal	Frank Duncan McLachlin	8,952
Co-operative Commonwealth	Alec Richmond	3,137

1957 Canadian federal election: Middlesex East
Party	Candidate	Votes
Progressive Conservative	Harry Oliver White	20,287
Liberal	Fred O. Kime	9,323
Co-operative Commonwealth	James Johnson	3,242

1958 Canadian federal election: Middlesex East
Party	Candidate	Votes
Progressive Conservative	Harry Oliver White	24,896
Liberal	Harry Roe Plewes	7,849
Co-operative Commonwealth	Andrew Grant	3,125
