= Malcolm McGugan =

Canadian politician

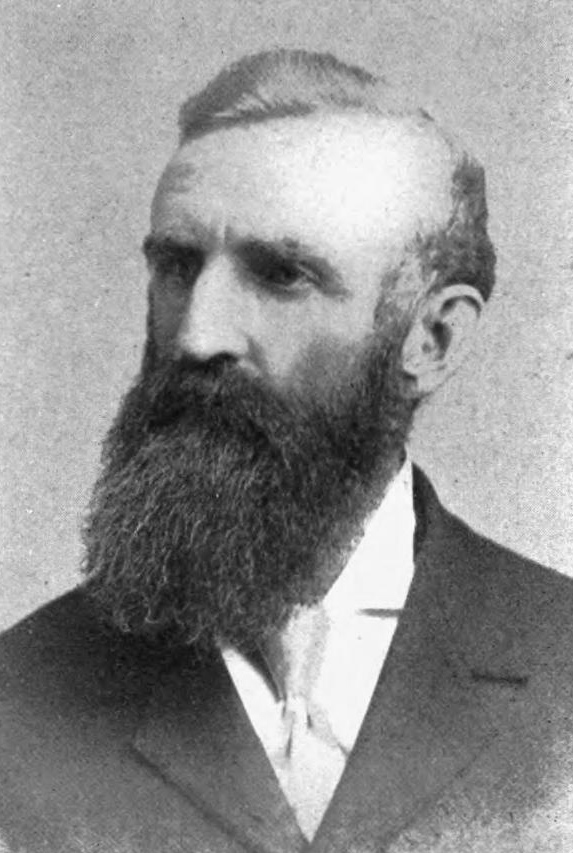
Malcolm McGugan

Malcolm McGugan (13 July 1846 – 1 November 1937) was a farmer and political figure in Ontario, Canada. He represented Middlesex South in the House of Commons of Canada from 1896 to 1904 as a Liberal.

He was born in Caradoc Township, Canada West, the son of Scottish immigrants from Argyleshire. In 1885, he married Mary Ann Smith. McGugan served on the township council for Caradoc from 1877 to 1886, was reeve from 1879 to 1886 and warden for Middlesex County in 1885.
