= Duncan Macmillan (Canadian politician) =

Canadian politician (1837–1903)

Duncan Macmillan (February 11, 1837 – April 21, 1903) was a Canadian lawyer, judge and political figure in Ontario, Canada. He represented Middlesex East in the House of Commons of Canada from 1875 to 1887 as a Liberal-Conservative member.

He was born in London Township, Upper Canada, the son of William Macmillan, and was educated at Queen's University. Macmillan studied law with Sir John A. Macdonald and was called to the bar in 1861. He practised law in London, Ontario. He was elected to the House of Commons in an 1875 by-election held after Crowell Willson was unseated. In 1873, he was named a judge in the court for Haldimand County. Macmillan died at the age of 66 in London, Ontario while still a judge.

By-election on 28 January 1875
| Party | Candidate | Votes |
| Liberal–Conservative | Duncan Macmillan | 2,098 |
| Unknown | James Armstrong | 1,926 |

1878 Canadian federal election: Middlesex East
| Party | Candidate | Votes |
|---|---|---|
| Liberal–Conservative | Duncan Macmillan | 2,428 |
| Conservative | David Glass | 2,332 |

1882 Canadian federal election: Middlesex East
| Party | Candidate | Votes |
|---|---|---|
| Liberal–Conservative | Duncan Macmillan | 1,949 |
| Unknown | Isaac Langford | 1,454 |
