= Lake Whitaker =

Lake in Ontario, Canada

Lake Whittaker
- Location within Ontario
- Location: Thames Centre, Ontario
- Coordinates: 42.913°N 80.959°W
- Basin countries: Canada

Lake Whittaker is a spring-fed lake located in the township of Thames Centre, just outside the hamlet of Avon. The lake is managed by the Kettle Creek Conservation Authority.
