= Garnet Bloomfield =

Canadian politician (1929–2018)

Member of Parliament for London—Middlesex
- In office 1980–1984
- Preceded by: Nelson Elliott
- Succeeded by: Terry Clifford

Personal details
- Born: Garnet McCallum Bloomfield; 8 April 1929 Ilderton, Ontario, Canada
- Died: 1 August 2018 (aged 89)
- Party: Canadian Alliance (2000)
- Other political affiliations: Liberal (1979-1988); Reform (1997)
- Spouse: Mildred Catherine Ronson (m. 1951; died 2015)
- Children: 2
- Profession: farmer

Garnet McCallum Bloomfield (8 April 1929 – 1 August 2018) was a Canadian politician and farmer by career, who was a member of the Liberal Party of Canada and the House of Commons of Canada.

He represented the London—Middlesex electoral district after winning that riding in the 1980 federal election. His previous attempt to win the riding in 1979 was unsuccessful.

Bloomfield served only in the 32nd Canadian Parliament before his defeat in 1984 federal election by Terry Clifford of the Progressive Conservative party. He also campaigned at the riding in the 1988 federal election but was again unsuccessful against Clifford, losing by only 8 votes.

After switching membership to the Reform Party, he contested the 1997 federal election in the Perth—Middlesex electoral district but lost to the Liberal and Progressive Conservative candidates there. The same result occurred when he campaigned again in Perth—Middlesex in the 2000 federal election as a candidate for the Canadian Reform Conservative Alliance.
