= London—Fanshawe (federal electoral district) =

Federal electoral district in Ontario, Canada

Coordinates: 43.00°N 81.18°W

Ontario electoral district
- Interactive map of riding boundaries from the 2025 federal election

Federal electoral district
- Legislature: House of Commons
MP
Kurt Holman
Conservative
- District created: 1996
- First contested: 1997
- Last contested: 2025
- District webpage: profile, map

Demographics
- Population (2011): 119,334
- Electors (2015): 85,124
- Area (km²): 124
- Pop. density (per km²): 962.4
- Census division: Middlesex
- Census subdivision: London (part)

London—Fanshawe is a federal electoral district in Ontario, Canada, that has been represented in the House of Commons of Canada since 1997.

== Geography ==
The district consists of the southeast part of the City of London.

== History ==
The riding was created in 1996 from parts of London East and London—Middlesex. From 1997 until 2005 it was represented by Liberal/Independent Member of Parliament Pat O'Brien.

It consisted initially of the part of the City of London lying east and north of a line drawn from the northern limit of the city south along Highbury Avenue and Highway 126, west along the Thames River, south along the Canadian National Railway tracks, west along Commissioners Road East, south along Wharncliffe Road South, east along Southdale Road East, south along White Oak Road, east along Exeter Road, north along Meg Drive, west along Jalna Boulevard, north along Ernest Avenue, east along Bradley Avenue, north along the Highbury Avenue, east along Arran Place and Bradley Avenue to the eastern limit of the city.

In 2003, it was given its current boundaries as described above.

This riding gained territory from London North Centre and Elgin—Middlesex—London during the 2012 electoral redistribution.

== Demographics ==
According to the 2021 Canadian census

Ethnic groups: 67.7% White, 5.8% Arab, 5.4% Black, 5.0% South Asian, 4.4% Indigenous, 3.2% Latin American, 2.4% Southeast Asian, 2.0% Filipino, 1.0% Chinese, 1.0% West Asian

Languages: 72.4% English, 4.1% Arabic, 2.8% Spanish, 1.9% Portuguese, 1.5% Polish, 1.1% French, 1.0% Punjabi

Religions: 48.5% Christian (22.6% Catholic, 3.9% Anglican, 3.8% United Church, 1.6% Baptist, 1.5% Christian Orthodox, 1.5% Pentecostal, 1.3% Presbyterian, 12.3% Other), 8.7% Muslim, 1.3% Hindu, 1.1% Buddhist, 1.1% Sikh, 38.1% None

Median income: $37,600 (2020)

Average income: $43,120 (2020)

== Members of Parliament ==
This riding has elected the following members of the House of Commons of Canada:

Parliament	Years	Member	Party
London—Fanshawe; Riding created from London East and London—Middlesex
36th	1997–2000	Pat O'Brien	Liberal
37th	2000–2004	Pat O'Brien	Liberal
38th	2004–2005	Pat O'Brien	Liberal
38th	2005–2006	Pat O'Brien	Independent
39th	2006–2008	Irene Mathyssen	New Democratic
40th	2008–2011	Irene Mathyssen	New Democratic
41st	2011–2015	Irene Mathyssen	New Democratic
42nd	2015–2019	Irene Mathyssen	New Democratic
43rd	2019–2021	Lindsay Mathyssen	New Democratic
44th	2021–2025	Lindsay Mathyssen	New Democratic
45th	2025–present	Kurt Holman	Conservative

== Election results ==
Graph of election results in London—Fanshawe (minor parties that never got 2% of the vote or didn't run consistently are omitted)

2025 Canadian federal election
Party	Candidate	Votes	%	±%	Expenditures
Conservative	Kurt Holman	23,749	40.58	+16.31	$55,491.76
Liberal	Najam Naqvi	17,863	30.52	+7.47	$62,403.28
New Democratic	Lindsay Mathyssen	16,135	27.57	–15.93	$120,496.50
People's	Daniel Buta	776	1.33	–7.85	$0.00
Total valid votes/expense limit		58,523	98.99	–	$138,363.98
Total rejected ballots		596	1.01		
Turnout		59,119	63.33		
Eligible voters		93,354			
Conservative notional gain from New Democratic		Swing		+4.47	
Source: CBC, Elections Canada

2021 federal election redistributed results
Party	Vote	%
New Democratic	22,236	43.50
Conservative	12,406	24.27
Liberal	11,780	23.05
People's	4,692	9.18

2021 Canadian federal election
Party	Candidate	Votes	%	±%	Expenditures
New Democratic	Lindsay Mathyssen	22,336	43.44	+2.65	$87,156.27
Conservative	Mattias Vanderley	12,486	24.28	-0.50	$27,879.92
Liberal	Mohamed Hammoud	11,882	23.11	-3.74	$34,106.52
People's	Kyle Free	4,718	9.18	+7.14	$6,247.35
Total valid votes/expense limit		51,422	99.02	-0.06	$120,013.52
Total rejected ballots		511	0.98	+0.06	
Turnout		51,933	56.62	-3.09	
Eligible voters		91,727			
New Democratic hold		Swing		+1.58	
Source: Elections Canada

2019 Canadian federal election
Party	Candidate	Votes	%	±%	Expenditures
New Democratic	Lindsay Mathyssen	22,671	40.79	+3.01	$87,107.75
Liberal	Mohamed Hammoud	14,924	26.85	-4.59	$87,821.00
Conservative	Michael van Holst	13,770	24.78	-2.42	$45,864.85
Green	Tom Cull	2,781	5.00	+2.07	$6,691.69
People's	Bela Kosoian	1,132	2.04		$2,704.60
Independent	Stephen Campbell	297	0.53		none listed
Total valid votes/expense limit		55,575	99.08		
Total rejected ballots		518	0.92	+0.41	
Turnout		56,093	59.71	-3.33	
Eligible voters		93,944			
New Democratic hold		Swing		+3.80	
Source: Elections Canada

2015 Canadian federal election
Party	Candidate	Votes	%	±%	Expenditures
New Democratic	Irene Mathyssen	20,684	37.78	−12.06	$90,397.33
Liberal	Khalil Ramal	17,214	31.44	+19.41	$47,724.86
Conservative	Suzanna Dieleman	14,891	27.20	−6.72	$57,368.78
Green	Matthew Peloza	1,604	2.93	−0.05	$1,194.57
Independent	Ali Hamadi	352	0.64	–	$200.00
Total valid votes/Expense limit		54,745	99.49		$224,287.69
Total rejected ballots		283	0.51	–	
Turnout		55,028	63.03	–	
Eligible voters		87,298			
New Democratic hold		Swing		−15.74	
Source: Elections Canada

2011 federal election redistributed results
Party	Vote	%
New Democratic	23,655	49.85
Conservative	16,098	33.92
Liberal	5,709	12.03
Green	1,412	2.98
Others	581	1.22

2011 Canadian federal election
Party	Candidate	Votes	%	±%	Expenditures
New Democratic	Irene Mathyssen	21,689	50.89	+7.83	–
Conservative	Jim Chahbar	14,294	33.55	+2.71	–
Liberal	Roger Caranci	4,893	11.48	−7.46	–
Green	Matthew Peloza	1,202	2.82	−3.65	–
Christian Heritage	G.J. Rancourt	535	1.26	+0.59	–
Total valid votes/Expense limit		42,613	100.00		
Total rejected ballots		236	0.55	+0.08	
Turnout		42,849	57.64	+2.53	
Eligible voters		74,338	–	–	

2008 Canadian federal election
Party	Candidate	Votes	%	±%	Expenditures
New Democratic	Irene Mathyssen	17,672	43.06	+8.56	$72,219
Conservative	Mary Lou Ambrogio	12,659	30.84	+1.82	$73,601
Liberal	Jacquie Gauthier	7,774	18.94	−13.70	$62,713
Green	Daniel O'Neail	2,656	6.47	+2.60	
Christian Heritage	Leonard Vanderhoeven	276	0.67	–	$568
Total valid votes/Expense limit		41,037	100.00	$82,792	
Rejected ballots		194	0.47	+.0.01	
Turnout		41,231	55.11	−7.12	

2006 Canadian federal election
Party	Candidate	Votes	%	±%
New Democratic	Irene Mathyssen	16,067	34.50	+4.1
Liberal	Glen Pearson	15,199	32.64	−5.5
Conservative	Dan Mailer	13,495	28.98	+2.7
Green	David McLaughlin	1,803	3.87	−0.1
Total valid votes		46,564	100.00	
Rejected ballots		215	0.46	
Turnout		46,779	62.23	

2004 Canadian federal election
Party	Candidate	Votes	%	±%
Liberal	Pat O'Brien	15,664	38.1	−16.7
New Democratic	Irene Mathyssen	12,511	30.4	+19.0
Conservative	John Mazzilli	10,811	26.3	−7.5
Green	Ed Moore	1,634	4.0	
Progressive Canadian	Derrall Bellaire	453	1.1	
Marxist–Leninist	Cameron Switzer	65	0.2	
Total valid votes		41,138	100.0	

Note: Conservative vote is compared to the total of the Canadian Alliance vote and Progressive Conservative vote in 2000 election.

2000 Canadian federal election
Party	Candidate	Votes	%	±%
Liberal	Pat O'Brien	19,677	54.8	+3.6
Alliance	Robert Vaughan	7,998	22.3	+5.2
Progressive Conservative	Derrall Bellaire	4,119	11.5	−2.3
New Democratic	Andrew Sadler	4,107	11.4	−5.4
Total valid votes		35,901	100.0	

Note: Canadian Alliance vote is compared to the Reform vote in 1997 election.

1997 Canadian federal election
Party	Candidate	Votes	%
Liberal	Pat O'Brien	20,497	51.2
Reform	Scott Bowman	6,838	17.1
New Democratic	Irene Mathyssen	6,754	16.9
Progressive Conservative	Daniel Thrasher	5,499	13.7
Green	Heidi Strasser	442	1.1
Total valid votes		40,030	100.0

== Student vote results ==
2025 London—Fanshawe student vote
36.65%	27.54%	26.56%	9.26%
NDP	Liberal	Conservative	PPC

== See also ==
- List of Canadian electoral districts
- Historical federal electoral districts of Canada
