= Leonard N. Boston =

American physician

Leonard Napoleon Boston (March 18, 1871–1931) was an American physician remembered for describing Boston's sign.

== Biography ==
Leonard Boston was born in 1871 in Philadelphia, and graduated with an M.D. in 1896 from the Medico-Chirurgical College of Philadelphia. He became Professor of Physical Diagnosis in 1912, and then Associate Professor of Medicine at the University of Pennsylvania in 1919. He became Professor of Principles and Practice of Medicine at the Women's Medical College of Pennsylvania in 1928. He died from erysipelas in 1931.
