= Kurt Holman =

Canadian politician

Kurt Holman MP

Member of Parliament for London—Fanshawe
- Incumbent
- Assumed office April 28, 2025
- Preceded by: Lindsay Mathyssen

Personal details
- Born: 1980 or 1981 (age 45–46) Sarnia, Ontario, Canada
- Party: Conservative

Kurt Holman is a Canadian politician who was elected to represent the riding of London—Fanshawe in the House of Commons of Canada in the 2025 Canadian federal election.

== Background ==
Holman was born in Sarnia, Ontario and grew up in Forest. He earned a diploma computer engineering technology from Lambton College and later earned an Executive MBA from the DeGroote School of Business at McMaster University. Prior to entering politics, he worked in information technology for 27 years.

== Political career ==
In the 2025 federal election, Holman was elected member of Parliament for London—Fanshawe, defeating NDP incumbent Lindsay Mathyssen.

== Electoral record ==
2025 Canadian federal election: London—Fanshawe
Party	Candidate	Votes	%	±%	Expenditures
Conservative	Kurt Holman	23,749	40.58	+16.31	$55,491.76
Liberal	Najam Naqvi	17,863	30.52	+7.47	$62,403.28
New Democratic	Lindsay Mathyssen	16,135	27.57	–15.93	$120,496.50
People's	Daniel Buta	776	1.33	–7.85	$0.00
Total valid votes/expense limit		58,523	98.99	–	$138,363.98
Total rejected ballots		596	1.01		
Turnout		59,119	63.33		
Eligible voters		93,354			
Conservative notional gain from New Democratic		Swing		+4.47	
Source: CBC, Elections Canada
