= Roseina Boston =

Female Indigenous Australian

- Wanangaa
- Born: 3 March 1935; Stuart Island, New South Wales, Australia
- Died: September 2018 (aged 83)
- Other names: Auntie Rose
- Musical career
- Instrument: Gumleaf

Roseina "Auntie Rose" Boston (3 March 1935 – September 2018) was an Gumbaynggirr Aboriginal elder known for her gumleaf music. Her Indigenous name was Wanangaa, meaning "stop".

== Career ==
Growing up on Stuart Island, New South Wales, Australia in an area that is now a golf course, she learned how to play the local eucalyptus gum leaves after hearing her uncles play.

Boston took part in the Australian Gumleaf Playing Championships, which ran between 1977 and 1997. No Indigenous person ever won the competition, but Boston did place fourth.

Her album, Aunty Rose and the gumleaf, was released in 2000 and Boston became the only female gumleaf player to have her music recorded for CD. She also painted.

Through her career, Boston was played frequently on Australian radio, and audio and video recordings of her work are held at the Australian Institute of Aboriginal Studies, National Library of Australia, Department of Music Monash University, and National Film and Sound Archive.

Roseina Boston died in 2018, and was survived by her husband Harry Boston.
