= Frank E. Boston =

African- American physician (1890 – 1960)

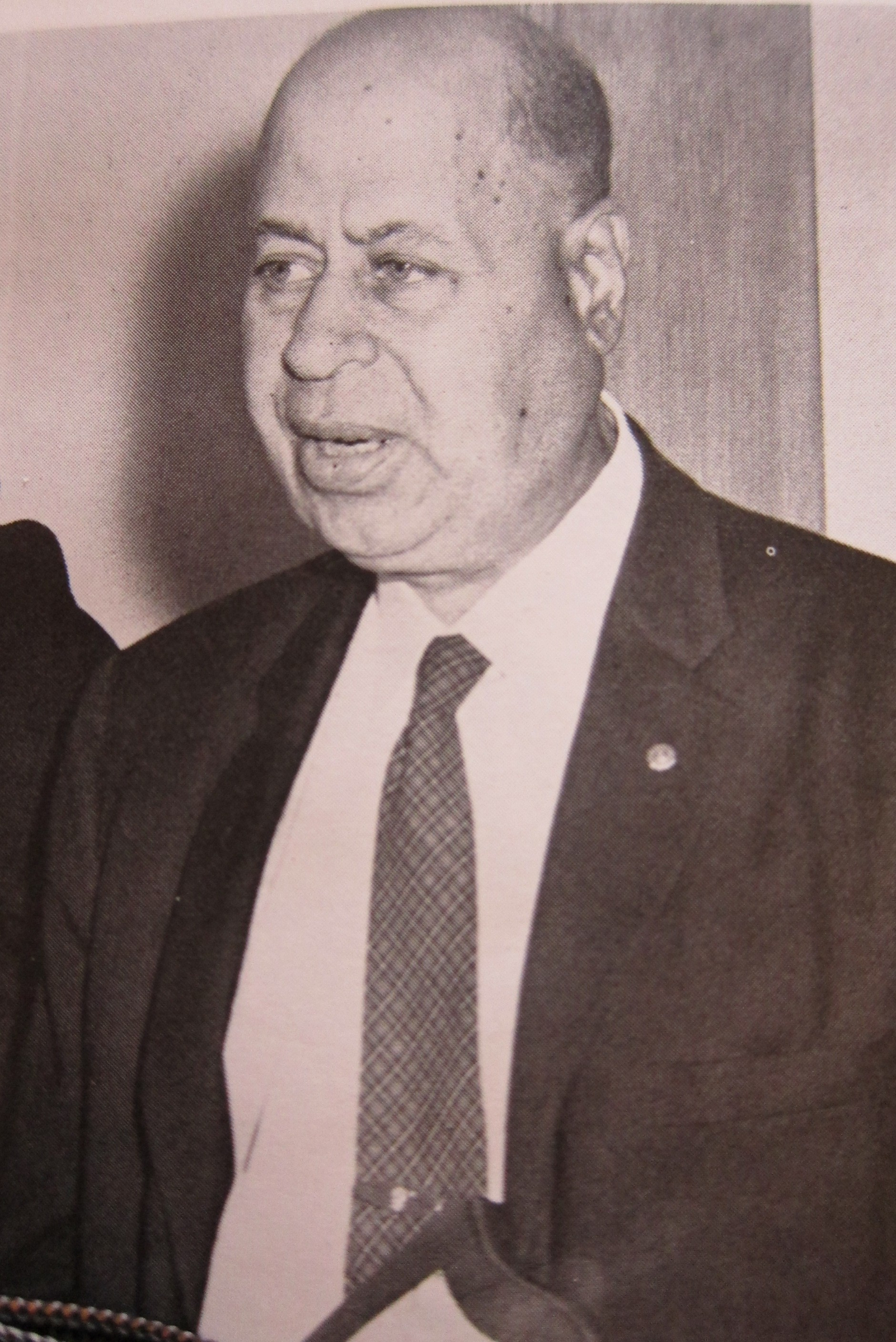
- Dr. Frank E. Boston
- Born: Frank Erdman Boston; March 10, 1890; Philadelphia, Pennsylvania
- Died: February 8, 1960 (aged 69); Greater Philadelphia, Pennsylvania
- Education: Lincoln University; Medico Chirurgical College (1915)
- Occupation: Physician
- Employer(s): Roosevelt Hospital; Mercy Hospital
- Title: Major
- Parent(s): Charles A. Boston; Julia Sands
- Relatives: Edgar Boston (brother); Mae Boston (sister); S. Clifford Boston (brother)

Frank Erdman Boston (March 10, 1890 – February 8, 1960) was an American physician. He served in World War I (as a part of the Medical Reserve Corps) in the 317th Infantry. He served in France with the rank captain and ended his military service as a major. After the war, he worked in Philadelphia and then moved to Lansdale, Pennsylvania, founding an ambulance corps and the North Penn Hospital (1954).

== Early life ==
Boston was born in Philadelphia, Pennsylvania, the youngest of four children born to Charles A. Boston and Julia Sands on March 10, 1890.

He was educated and raised entirely in Philadelphia before entering Lincoln University. After graduating from college, he attended Medico Chirurgical College. He finished his medical studies in 1915 and received certification in 1916, where he specialized in surgery. Boston began his medical career as an intern in Roosevelt Hospital.

Boston's first confrontation with the media was in May 1916. He had been criticized by the local coroner's office after the death of a young boy. The boy had come in after a car accident with a massive head injury, and because the hospital lacked an X-ray machine, Boston drove the injured boy to the nearest equipped hospital. After the X-ray Boston performed, however, the child did not survive. In the article, he defends the actions of his colleagues and himself:

The child was brought in about 5:30 o'clock... I saw at once that he had suffered a serious brain injury and was in a bad condition owing to the shock. An immediate operation was out of the question on this account. I decided that Dr. Franklin R. Brady, who is an eminent surgeon in brain operations, ought to see him, so I went at once with a child in the automobile to the Medico Chirurgical Hospital in order to obtain a clear X-ray record. We have no X-ray outfit, although we have tried several times to raise the funds to secure one... We are doing our best with the equipment available... and I feel like in this case we acted properly to the best of our judgement. I consulted Doctor Brady, our president, and it was with his sanction that I took the child to Medico Chirurgical Hospital for X-ray purposes. We could not determine at first whether or not his skull was fractured, and took the sure means to ascertain. We were not gone for 15 minutes and the boy was able to talk. He did not display any dangerous symptom until a short time before he died, and we were about to operate when he suddenly became unconscious. If we had been provided the X-ray we would not have removed the child after he was first brought to our doors.

He later took a position as surgeon in Mercy Hospital, while maintaining a private practice in Philadelphia. He opened his own medical practice in Lansdale.

== Military service ==
In 1917, the United States joined World War I and the entire nation was in a buzz to join the effort. After the declaration of war with Germany, many African Americans were turned away from the local recruiting stations. Unprepared for a large-scale conflict, the United States Army had only four black regiments, and many commanders would not allow mixing of blacks and whites in their units. Also, the black regiments themselves were not trusted to be sent to Europe, as many of the higher ups possessed a lack of confidence in black soldiers as fighters.

Fort Des Moines Provisional Army Officer Training School had been opened for training African American men as there had been a huge influx of African American volunteers and a petition was erected by the students of Howard University. However, there was still some discontent at the facility as many soldiers found that he had been unfairly assessed for merely being black.

When Boston answered the military's call for physicians, he was immediately given the rank of first lieutenant in the Army Medical Reserve Corps. Like all the African American recruits, he was sent to Fort Des Moines for medical training at the Medical Officers Training Camp. After completing his training, he was assigned as a medical officer with the 317th Engineers Regiment of the 92nd Division. Before leaving for France, Boston spent additional time in Camp Sherman, Ohio, where his abilities and rigor were so well recognized that he was promoted to captain.

When arriving at France, he found a large amount of work on his plate. The 317th Engineering Regiment was the other option for black citizens wanting to enlist into work. Most African American soldiers had been assigned to noncombatant engineer units that performed dangerous and hard jobs of digging trenches, forming roads, and fortification against the Germans. Boston spent his time in France taking care of sick men and those heavily injured from building, as the Germans were becoming more aggressive in late 1918. Later, he would display his extraordinary skill as a surgeon.

After the conclusions of the war, Boston remained at his commission in the Medical Reserve Corps. While there, he was in communication with W.E.B. Du Bois. Four surviving letters exist to confirm the correspondence. When the war ended Du Bois sought out and interviewed many African American soldiers for a scheduled book on their experiences. In a letter Du Boise sent to Boston on April 16, 1919:

My dear Captain Boston,
I want very much to get hold of facts concerning your regiment. Have you written up the history of the regiment or your personal adventures, if so could you furnish me copies. I should be glad to hear from you on the matter, or to see you if you are going to be in New York soon. Very Sincerely Yours--WEBDB"

At the time, Boston was living in 813 N. 16th Street, Philadelphia, and in one of his letters to Du Bois, he replied:

Dear W.E.B. DuBois
In answer to your letter of April 5th, would say that I am now on leave of absence and will be at the above address. Very little is known, outside of official circles, about the excellent work of our regiment. Would be glad to see you at any time and render any aid possible. Yours truly, Frank E. Boston--Cpt. M.O, U.S. Army" (April 6, 1919)

It is unknown whether the two men ever actually met.

In 1919, Boston was given the rank of major, and he was even a member of the Association of Military Surgeons. He was discharged in the later months of 1919.

== Career ==
When Boston left the military, he returned to his medical practice in Philadelphia. He placed a heavy emphasis on providing medical assistance and education towards the community. He had been a member of the American Medical Association, the Philadelphia County Medical Society, the International College of Surgeons, and the National Medical Association. At the 1926 annual convention, Boston was listed as chairman of the Committee for Gynecologists and General Surgeons in the Journal of the National Medical Association. He proceeded to open stations at Mercy Hospital for well-known surgeons to operate.

Boston was often involved in veteran fundraisers and work dedicated work to Veterans of Foreign Wars. In 1934, he opened a hospital in Lansdale called the Elm Terrace Hospital, which would be renamed North Penn Hospital in 1954, and eventually became part of the Jefferson Health Systems. It is now known as the Lansdale Abington Hospital. He continued his association with Mercy Hospital during the 1930s, participating in various clinical lectures, and was credited for it in the Chicago Defender.

== Death ==
In 1960, Boston died, unmarried, at the age of 69, in Einstein Medical Center. Upon his death, his many peers from both the hospital and the Emergency Relief Squad came to sing at his grave.

Boston was buried in Whitemarsh Cemetery in Pennsylvania. The First Baptist Church in Lansdale, Pennsylvania established a memorial consisting of a sculpture made by S.K. Miller, which exists today at 7th & Broad Streets in Lansdale. On June 8, 2022, the PA state legislature voted to designate part of State Route 2004 in Lansdale and Hatfield the Dr. Frank Erdman Boston Memorial Highway.
