= Larry Condon =

Canadian politician

Joseph Lawrence (Larry) Condon (July 3, 1933 – January 11, 1991) was a Canadian politician.

Condon served one term in the House of Commons of Canada as a federal Liberal Member of Parliament (MP). He was elected in the 1974 election from the southwestern Ontario riding of Middlesex—London—Lambton.

In 1976, he attempted to enter provincial politics as a candidate for the Ontario Liberal Party leadership, but finished fifth with only 37 votes.

He lost his seat in the federal Parliament when he was defeated in the 1979 election with 15,335 votes to 18,770 votes for Progressive Conservative candidate Sid Fraleigh.
