= Absalom Boston =

American businessman

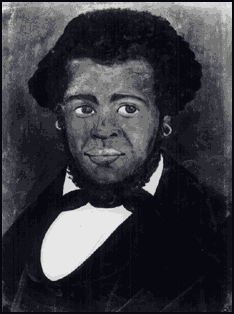
- Absalom Boston
- Born: c. 1785; Nantucket, Massachusetts, USA
- Died: 1855; Nantucket, Massachusetts, USA
- Occupations: Mariner, entrepreneur, civic leader

Absalom Boston (c. 1785–1855) was a United States mariner who was the first African-American captain to sail a whaling ship, with an all-black crew, in 1822.

== Biography ==
Absalom Boston was born in Nantucket, Massachusetts, to Seneca Boston, an African-American ex-slave father, and Thankful Micah, a Wampanoag Indian mother. His uncle, a slave named Prince Boston, was part of the crew of a 1770 whaling voyage, but refused to turn over his earnings to his white master. Instead, he went to court and won both his earnings and freedom, making him the first black slave to win his freedom in a U.S. jury trial.

Boston spent his early years working in the whaling industry. By the time he reached 20, he acquired enough money to purchase property in Nantucket. Ten years later, he obtained a license to open and operate a public inn.

In 1822, Boston became the captain of the Industry, a whaleship manned entirely with an African-American crew. The six-month journey returned with 70 barrels of whale oil and the entire crew intact.

Boston retired from the sea after the Industry returned to Nantucket from its historic voyage. He concentrated on becoming a business and community leader, and also ran for public office. Together with fellow captain, Edward Pompey, he led the Nantucket abolitionist movement. He was also a founding trustee of Nantucket's African Baptist Society, and the African Meeting House in Nantucket. In 1827 he married Hannah Cook (1795–1857). Hannah assisted in founding and operations of the African Meetinghouse. In 1845, after his daughter Phebe Ann Boston was barred from attending a public school, Absalom and Hannah successfully brought a lawsuit against the Nantucket municipal government to integrate the public education system. After Absalom's death in 1855, he left Hannah a large estate. She did, however, continue to work to support herself as the first ever female Steamship Stewardess for the Nantucket Steamboat Company. Hannah Cook Boston died in 1857.
