= Roston (surname) =

Roston is a surname. Notable people with the surname include:

- Aram Roston, American investigative journalist
- Murray Roston (born 1928), Israeli literary scholar
- Saulo Roston (born 1989), Brazilian pop singer and songwriter

== See also ==
- Raston
