= Robert Boston (politician) =

Canadian politician

Member of the Canadian Parliament for Middlesex South
- In office 1893–1896
- Preceded by: James Armstrong
- Succeeded by: Malcolm McGugan

Personal details
- Born: c. 1836 Melrose, Upper Canada
- Died: April 12, 1922 Unknown
- Party: Liberal
- Occupation: farmer

Robert Boston (c. 1836 – April 12, 1922) was a Canadian politician and farmer. Born in Melrose, Upper Canada, Boston was acclaimed to the House of Commons of Canada in an 1893 by-election upon the death of James Armstrong as a Member of the Liberal Party to represent the riding of Middlesex South. He lost the election in 1904 in the riding of Middlesex North to Valentine Ratz, both of whom were Liberal candidates.
