= London—Middlesex =

Former federal electoral district in Ontario, Canada

Ontario electoral district

Defunct federal electoral district
- Legislature: House of Commons
- District created: 1976
- District abolished: 1996
- First contested: 1979
- Last contested: 1993

London—Middlesex (also known as Middlesex East riding) was a federal electoral district that was represented in the House of Commons of Canada from 1979 to 1997. It was located in the province of Ontario.

Middlesex East riding was created in 1976 from parts of Huron—Middlesex, London East and Middlesex—London—Lambton ridings. It initially consisted of the Townships of Biddulph, London, North Dorchester, Westminster and West Nissouri (excluding the Village of Belmont) and the southeast part of the City of London.

The name of the electoral district was changed in 1977 to "London-Middlesex".

In 1987, the Village of Belmont and the Village of Lucan were added. The City of London portion of the riding was redefined.

The electoral district was abolished in 1996 when it was redistributed between Elgin—Middlesex—London, London West, London—Adelaide, London—Fanshawe and Perth—Middlesex ridings.

== Members of Parliament ==
This riding has elected the following members of Parliament:

Parliament	Years	Member	Party
Riding created from Huron—Middlesex, London East and Middlesex—London—Lambton
31st	1979–1980	Nelson Elliott	Progressive Conservative
32nd	1980–1984	Garnet Bloomfield	Liberal
33rd	1984–1988	Terry Clifford	Progressive Conservative
34th	1988–1993	Terry Clifford	Progressive Conservative
35th	1993–1997	Pat O'Brien	Liberal
Riding dissolved into Elgin—Middlesex—London, London West, London—Adelaide, London—Fanshawe and Perth—Middlesex

== Electoral history ==
1979 Canadian federal election
Party	Candidate	Votes	%	±%
Progressive Conservative	Nelson Elliott	14,339	38.7%	
Liberal	Garnet Bloomfield	13,714	36.9%	
New Democratic	Bill Lloyd	8,855	23.8%	
Independent	Robert J. Paton	164	0.4%	
Independent	Rudy Terracina	40	0.1%	
Marxist–Leninist	Susan Mary Beland	37	0.1%	

1980 Canadian federal election
Party	Candidate	Votes
Liberal	Garnet Bloomfield	15,682
Progressive Conservative	Bill Frank	11,897
New Democratic	Bill Lloyd	8,672
Libertarian	Robert Metz	156
Marxist–Leninist	Susan Mary Beland	47

1984 Canadian federal election
Party	Candidate	Votes
Progressive Conservative	Terry Clifford	18,586
Liberal	Garnet Bloomfield	11,202
New Democratic	David N. Cunningham	9,753

1988 Canadian federal election
Party	Candidate	Votes
Progressive Conservative	Terry Clifford	18,534
Liberal	Garnet Bloomfield	18,526
New Democratic	Michael Wyatt	11,103
Not affiliated	Dawn Hemingway	195

1993 Canadian federal election
Party	Candidate	Votes
Liberal	Pat O'Brien	27,232
Reform	Mark Simpson	9,826
Progressive Conservative	Ed Holder	9,088
New Democratic	Carolyn Davies	2,646
National	David Howell	563
Christian Heritage	Stan Winters	539
Green	Sven Biggs	236
Natural Law	David Goodman	226
Canada Party	Arun D. Sehgal	153
Marxist–Leninist	Peter Ewart	56
Abolitionist	Marva Foster	44

Parliamentary website:Middlesex East Parliamentary website: London-Middlesex

== See also ==
- List of Canadian electoral districts
- Historical federal electoral districts of Canada
