= Prince Boston =

Prince Boston was born into slavery on Nantucket, Massachusetts in about 1750. His parents, Boston and Maria, were the slaves of William Swain, a Nantucket merchant. In 1760, William Swain freed Prince's parents with the stipulation that each of their children remain in servitude until the age of 28.

In 1773, Prince Boston became the first slave in Massachusetts to successfully sue for his freedom and was able to receive back wages for his time spent on a whaleship.

Prince Boston's nephew Absalom Boston would become the first whaleship captain to employ an all black crew.
