= Duncan Graham Ross =

Canadian politician

Duncan G. Ross

Member of Parliament for Middlesex East
- In office October 1935 – June 1945

Personal details
- Born: 26 May 1891 Tottenham, Ontario
- Died: 9 October 1982 (aged 91) London, Ontario
- Party: Liberal
- Spouse(s): Constance Vera Prendergast m. 7 Jan 1920
- Profession: merchant

Duncan Graham Ross (26 May 1891 – 9 October 1982) was a Canadian merchant, soldier and Liberal politician born in Tottenham, Ontario.

He served as part of the 47th Battalion of the Canadian Expeditionary Force during World War I and commanded the Middlesex Light Infantry Regiment from 1926 to 1931.

He first ran for MP in Middlesex East in 1921, and was defeated, as he was in 1930. In 1935 he finally won the seat, and held it until 1945 when he was defeated by Harry Oliver White.

He died at a hospital in London in 1982.

1930 Canadian federal election: Middlesex East
Party	Candidate	Votes
Conservative	Frank Boyes	7,909
Liberal	Duncan Graham Ross	6,231

1935 Canadian federal election: Middlesex East
Party	Candidate	Votes
Liberal	Duncan Graham Ross	7,151
Conservative	Frank Boyes	5,602
Reconstruction	Orville Chester Hughes	1,827
Co-operative Commonwealth	William James Mahon	1,306

1940 Canadian federal election: Middlesex East
Party	Candidate	Votes
Liberal	Duncan Graham Ross	8,444
National Government	Frederick George Fuller	6,256
Co-operative Commonwealth	Kenneth Elson Dickie	1,577

1945 Canadian federal election: Middlesex East
Party	Candidate	Votes
Progressive Conservative	Harry Oliver White	8,808
Liberal	Duncan Graham Ross	7,442
Co-operative Commonwealth	Kenneth Elson Dickie	2,398
