= Lambeth, London, Ontario =

Lambeth
- Neighbourhood
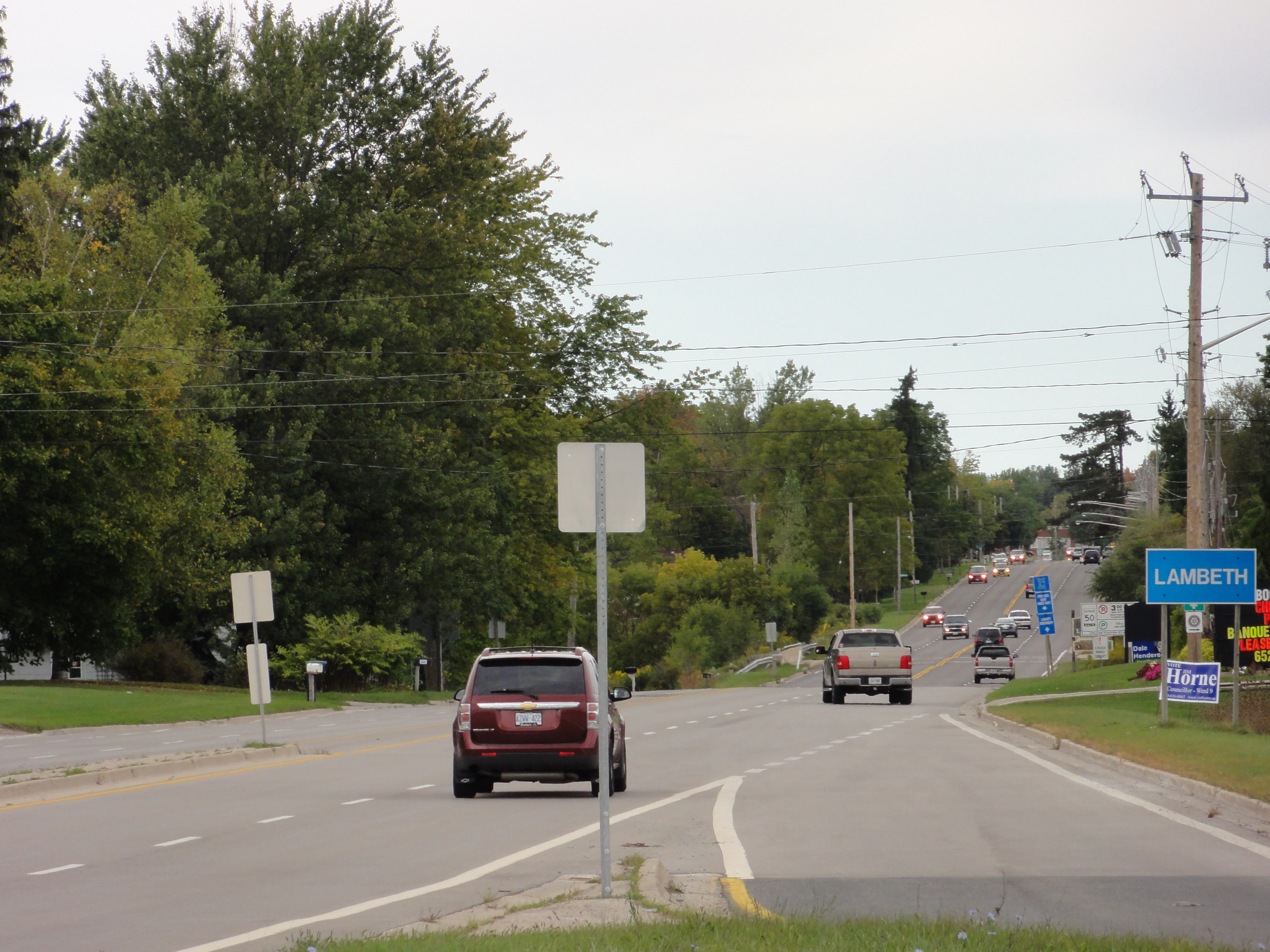
- Highway 4 looking north towards Lambeth from the Highway 402 interchange
- Interactive map of Lambeth
- Coordinates: 42°54′36″N 81°18′0″W
- Country: Canada
- Province: Ontario
- City: London
- Settled Lambeth: 1885
- Incorporated (town): 1988 (as Westminster)
- Amalgamation (city): 1993 (as London)

Government
  - Type: Municipal (Ward 9)
  - Administrative body: London City Council
  - Councillor: Anna Hopkins

Population (2016)
  - Total: 4,170
  - Average Income: $49,367
- Time zone: UTC-5 (Eastern Time Zone)
  - Summer (DST): UTC-4 (Eastern Time Zone)
- Postal Code: N6P

Lambeth (/ˈlæmbəθ/) is a neighbourhood in the City of London, Ontario, Canada. It is immediately north of Highway 402, and east of Colonel Talbot Road. Almost all of its residents live in low-density, single detached dwellings. As of 2016, the area is home to 4,170 residents. The neighbourhood is considered a middle to upper-income area, with an average family income of $145,112 an average dwelling value of $398,082 and a home ownership rate of 93%.

== History ==
Lambeth was formerly a population centre in Westminster Township, Middlesex County, Ontario, Canada. It held the status of Police Village (lacking corporate status as a village, but administered by a board of trustees) until an effort was made by the local Reeve, David Murray, to stop annexation by the City of London which brought about the creation of the Town of Westminster in 1988, which itself ceased to exist on December 31, 1992. On January 1, 1993, the Town of Westminster, including the village of Lambeth, became part of the City of London. As Lambeth is still somewhat separated from the city's urban area, some residents still think of the neighbourhood as a distinct town, and there still official town limit signs when entering it.

Its post office dates from 1857.

During World War II, the Royal Canadian Navy set up a radio direction finding (radar) station at Lambeth. Its purpose was to acquire a bearing whenever a German U-boat transmitted a radio messages back to their HQ. The resultant bearing was then sent to the Officer-In-Charge in Ottawa over a dedicated teletype line. Direction finding equipment was housed in a white shack located at an airfield in what is now a big box retail complex at the northwest corner of Wharncliffe Road and Wonderland Road (formerly Airport Road) a couple of kilometres from Lambeth. The station began operating in the first few days of January 1943 and closed war's end. Nothing remains of the runways or the buildings.

== Arts and culture ==
The neighbourhood comes together to celebrate its agricultural past each fall. This celebration is called Harvestfest and it usually takes place the first week after Labour Day, beginning on the Thursday and running until late Sunday. It features many events such as a baseball tournament, an adult dance, teen dance, and pre-teen dance, parade, occasional rides for kids, pancake breakfast for the town, auto show and shine, as well as two beer tents in different locations featuring a live band all day and night. Lambeth celebrated its 200th anniversary of settlement throughout 2009.

== Government and politics ==
Lambeth exists within the federal electoral district of Elgin—Middlesex—London. It is currently represented by Karen Vecchio of the Conservative Party of Canada, first elected in 2015.

Provincially, the area is within the constituency of Elgin—Middlesex—London. It is currently represented by Rob Flack of the Progressive Conservative Party, first elected in 2022.

In London's non-partisan municipal politics, Lambeth lies within ward 9. It is currently represented by Councillor Anna Hopkins, first elected in 2014.

== Infrastructure ==
Until 1960, Lambeth was served by the Byron Telephone Company. The Byron Telephone Company had installed its first automatic dial exchange in Lambeth in the late 1950s, the OLiver 2 exchange, which replaced the manual magneto phone system that continued to operate in the Byron area until September 1963. The Byron company was sold to Bell Canada in August 1960, and Byron itself, a population centre, was annexed to London on January 1, 1961. Immediately prior to the conversion to dial, the Byron operator was reached from London telephones by dialing 471, which became the exchange prefix upon conversion to dial.

== Education ==
Lambeth Public School

Location
- 6820 Duffield Street; London, Ontario, N6P 1A4; Canada

Information
- Type: Elementary
- Opened: Opened Dec 10th 1965
- School board: Thames Valley District School Board
- Principal: Jamie Hicks
- Grades: Kindergarten to Grade 8
- Enrollment: 800 (2024-2025)
- Education system: Public
- Language: English
- Website: Lambeth Public School

Covenant Christian School

Location
- 7 Howard Avenue; London, Ontario, N6P 1B3; Canada

Information
- Type: Elementary
- Religious affiliation: Christian
- Opened: 1976
- School board: Canadian Reformed School Society of London and District
- Grades: Pre-Kindergarten to Grade 8
- Enrollment: 65 (2015)
- Education system: Separate
- Language: English
- Website: Covenant Christian School

- Lambeth Public School - public elementary, part of the Thames Valley District School Board
- Covenant Christian School - private Christian elementary, part of Canadian Reformed School Society of London and District
