= London East (federal electoral district) =

Former federal electoral district in Ontario, Canada

Ontario electoral district

Defunct federal electoral district
- Legislature: House of Commons
- District created: 1966
- District abolished: 1996
- First contested: 1968
- Last contested: 1993

London East was a federal electoral district represented in the House of Commons of Canada from 1968 to 1997. It was located in the province of Ontario. This riding was created in 1966 from parts of London and Middlesex East ridings.

It was initially defined as consisting of the eastern parts of the City of London, Ontario, and the Township of London. In 1976, it was redefined to consist of the eastern part of the City of London.

The electoral district was abolished in 1996 when it was redistributed between London West, London—Adelaide and London—Fanshawe ridings.

== Members of Parliament ==
This riding elected the following members of the House of Commons of Canada:

Parliament	Years	Member	Party
Riding created from London and Middlesex East
28th	1968–1972	Charles Turner	Liberal
29th	1972–1974	Charles Turner	Liberal
30th	1974–1979	Charles Turner	Liberal
31st	1979–1980	Charles Turner	Liberal
32nd	1989–1984	Charles Turner	Liberal
33rd	1984–1988	Jim Jepson	Progressive Conservative
34th	1988–1993	Joe Fontana	Liberal
35th	1993–1997	Joe Fontana	Liberal
Riding dissolved into London—Adelaide, London—Fanshawe and London West

== Electoral history ==
1968 Canadian federal election
Party	Candidate	Votes	%	±%
Liberal	Charles Turner	11,823	37.3%	
Progressive Conservative	Don Matthews	10,079	31.8%	
New Democratic	Alec Richmond	9,703	30.6%	
National Socialist	Martin K. Weiche	89	0.3%	

1972 Canadian federal election
Party	Candidate	Votes	%	±%
Liberal	Charles Turner	14,022	37.6%	+0.3%
Progressive Conservative	Don Matthews	12,957	34.7%	+2.9%
New Democratic	Kenneth C. Bolton	10,355	27.7%	-2.9%

1974 Canadian federal election
Party	Candidate	Votes	%	±%
Liberal	Charles Turner	18,429	50.3%	+12.7%
Progressive Conservative	Doug Mackenzie	9,029	24.7%	-10.0%
New Democratic	Ray Funk	8,949	24.4%	-3.3%
Communist	Charles H. Lutz	98	0.3%	+0.3%
Independent	Sieg Pedde	72	0.2%	+0.2%
Marxist–Leninist	Ellen Haq	30	0.1%	+0.1%

1979 Canadian federal election
Party	Candidate	Votes	%	±%
Liberal	Charles Turner	16,331	42.5%	-7.8%
Progressive Conservative	Tom Courchene	13,386	34.9%	+10.2%
New Democratic	Rob Martin	8,531	22.2%	-2.2%
Libertarian	Greg R. Utas	79	0.2%	+0.2%
Marxist–Leninist	Carol Dagenais	56	0.2%	+0.1%

1980 Canadian federal election
Party	Candidate	Votes	%	±%
Liberal	Charles Turner	17,861	48.0%	+5.5%
Progressive Conservative	Bob Howard	11,031	29.7%	-5.2%
New Democratic	Rob Martin	8,055	21.7%	-0.5%
Libertarian	Marc Emery	197	0.5%	+0.3%
Marxist–Leninist	Carol Dagenais	31	0.1%	-0.1%

1984 Canadian federal election
Party	Candidate	Votes	%	±%
Progressive Conservative	Jim Jepson	18,154	47.2%	+17.5%
New Democratic	Joe Barth	10,324	26.9%	+5.2%
Liberal	Al Gleeson	9,948	25.9%	-22.1%

1988 Canadian federal election
Party	Candidate	Votes	%	±%
Liberal	Joe Fontana	19,547	37.7%	+11.8%
Progressive Conservative	Jim Jepson	19,445	37.5%	-9.7%
New Democratic	Marion Boyd	12,667	24.4%	-2.5%
Independent	Peter Ewart	201	0.4%	+0.4%

1993 Canadian federal election
Party	Candidate	Votes	%	±%
Liberal	Joe Fontana	28,279	55.8%	+18.1%
Progressive Conservative	Rob Alder	9,237	18.2%	-19.3%
Reform	Paul Cheng	8,704	17.2%	+17.2%
New Democratic	Alfredo Marroquin	2,614	5.2%	-19.2%
National	Bill Cecil-Smith	830	1.6%	+1.6%
Green	Jeff Culbert	567	1.1%	+1.1%
Natural Law	Jim Hill	282	0.6%	+0.6%
Canada Party	Al Plumb	108	0.2%	+0.2%
Commonwealth of Canada	Sid Tarleton	31	0.1%	+0.1%

== The former Village of London East ==
'London East' was a village that was annexed by the London, Ontario on August 20, 1884, and taking effect on January 1, 1885. The boundaries of London East were Adelaide Street to the west, Oxford Street to the north, Highbury Avenue to the east and the South branch of the Thames River to the south.

== See also ==
- List of Canadian electoral districts
- Historical federal electoral districts of Canada
