= Bob Boston =

American baseball player

- Pinch hitter / Outfielder / Third baseman
- Born: July 4, 1918; Dearing, Georgia, U.S.
- Died: July 2, 2002 (aged 83); Dayton, Ohio, U.S.
- Batted: Right Threw: Right

Negro league baseball debut
- 1948, for the Homestead Grays

Last appearance
- 1948, for the Homestead Grays
- Stats at Baseball Reference

Teams
- Homestead Grays (1948)

Robert Lee Boston (July 4, 1918 – July 2, 2002) was an American professional baseball player in the Negro leagues. He played with the Homestead Grays during their 1948 Negro World Series championship season.
