= Terry Clifford =

Canadian politician

Terrence (Terry) Clifford (born 12 November 1938) is a Canadian former educator and politician. Clifford served as a Progressive Conservative party member of the House of Commons of Canada.

Born in Acton, Ontario, Clifford was an educator and school principal by career. He was educated at Universities of; Guelph, Toronto and Cornell. Through a career in education spanning more than 25 years, he taught elementary, secondary and university levels, innovating several programs and authoring a mathematics text series. He also accepted provincial awards for outstanding community leadership, both as a teacher and principal.

Clifford represented the Ontario riding of London—Middlesex in the House of Commons, being elected the first time in the 1984 Canadian federal election and narrowly reelected in the 1988 Canadian federal election, thus serving in the 33rd and 34th Canadian Parliaments.

He served and chaired caucus and standing committees with both national and international responsibilities. Key areas of his work were energy / environment, employment, free trade, transport and European parliamentary relations. He has been recognized for his success in forging powerful cross partnerships and for his global initiatives in science, technology, business and education.

Clifford left federal politics in 1993 as he did not campaign for a third term. While there, he founded in 1991 a national organization called Global Vision that sends young Canadians on international trade missions and participates in the Prime Minister's initiatives at APEC, G8 and G20 Summits. In 2004, he was made a Member of the Order of Canada for his efforts with Global Vision.
