= Westminster, Middlesex County, Ontario =

Westminster
- Neighbourhood
- Location within Ontario
- Coordinates: 42°56′16.844″N 81°12′37″W
- Country: Canada
- Province: Ontario
- City: London
- Settled Westminster: 1817
- Incorporated (town): 1988 (as Westminster)
- Amalgamation (city): 1993 (as London)

Government
  - Type: Municipal (Ward 14)
  - Administrative body: London City Council
  - Councillor: Steve Hillier

Population (2011)
  - Total: 11,385
  - Average Income: $66,401
- Time zone: UTC-5 (Eastern Time Zone)
  - Summer (DST): UTC-4 (Eastern Daylight Time)

Westminster refers to both a neighbourhood in the City of London, Ontario, Canada, and a much larger area within which the neighbourhood lands have been situated.

The neighbourhood of Westminster is immediately north of Highway 401, and east of Wellington Road. The majority of its residents live in low-density, single detached dwellings. The remaining residents live in row house dwellings. As of 2011, the area is home to 11,385 residents. The neighbourhood is considered a middle-income area, with an average family income of $73,207, an average dwelling value of $216,133 and a home ownership rate of 88%.

Historically, Westminster first referred to a rural township, after which the neighbourhood was named.

== History ==
=== Township ===
Westminster Township was bounded on the north by the Thames River, which divides it from London Township; on the south by Elgin County, east by North Dorchester Township, and west by Delaware. It was one of the largest townships in Middlesex County. The first record of the Westminster Council is dated 4 March 1817.

As the city of London (incorporated as a city in 1855) grew, areas on the south side of the Thames River were developed, being adjacent to the city core, and they were later annexed to the city, ceasing to be part of Westminster Township. In the 1940s and 1950s, the developed area was expanding to the present site of the Westminster neighbourhood, and became part of the city with the 1961 annexation. The neighbourhood became known as Westminster, and was substantially developed in the 1970s.

The non-annexed portions of Westminster Township continued to be largely rural, with the most substantial population centre being the police village of Lambeth in the west.

=== Town ===
The Town of Westminster was a municipality established in 1988 from the former Westminster Township. It was created as an attempt to prevent annexation with nearby London. The town was made up of numerous population centres including Lambeth and Glanworth. Also, the municipality included the various commercial shopping malls along Wellington Road at Highway 401.

However, the Town of Westminster's life was short-lived. In the early 1990s, the City of London proposed a massive land annexation, which included the entire Westminster municipality.

In 1992, after months of political debates involving the Ontario government, the City of London, and local residents, the proposed annexation was allowed to proceed. On January 1, 1993, the Town of Westminster ceased to exist and most of it became part of the City of London. The rest was added to adjacent townships (Delaware Township to the west, South Dorchester Township to the east).

The annexed areas formed Ward 8 on London City Council. Ben Veel, the final mayor of Westminster, was appointed as councillor until a by-election in March 1993. Veel was elected and served until the next municipal election in 1994. When the term expired, Ward 8 was eliminated and redistributed among the other seven wards.

Most of the former town is excluded from London's current urban development area, but some portions annexed to the city are eligible for urban development and have been built on. The annexation solved infrastructure problems faced by the township subdivision of South Winds, now becoming able to be connected to city utilities without an interjurisdictional conundrum.

== Government and politics ==
Westminster exists within the federal electoral districts of London—Fanshawe and Elgin—St. Thomas—London South.

The area north and south of Highway 401 are represented by Kurt Holman and Andrew Lawton respectively, who are both from the Conservative Party and was first elected in 2025.

Provincially, the area is within the constituency of London-Fanshawe. It is currently represented by Teresa Armstrong of the New Democratic Party, first elected in 2011 and re-elected in 2014, 2018, 2022, and 2025. Westminster is also within the constituency of Elgin—Middlesex—London. It is currently represented by Rob Flack of the Progressive Conservative Party, first elected in 2022.

In London's non-partisan municipal politics, the former town of Westminster is split among wards 9, 12 and 14, with a very narrow sliver in Ward 10. The Westminster neighbourhood is entirely within Ward 14. It is currently represented by Councillor Steve Hillier, first elected in 2018.

== See also ==
- List of townships in Ontario
