= Thames Centre =

- Municipality (lower-tier)
- Municipality of Thames Centre
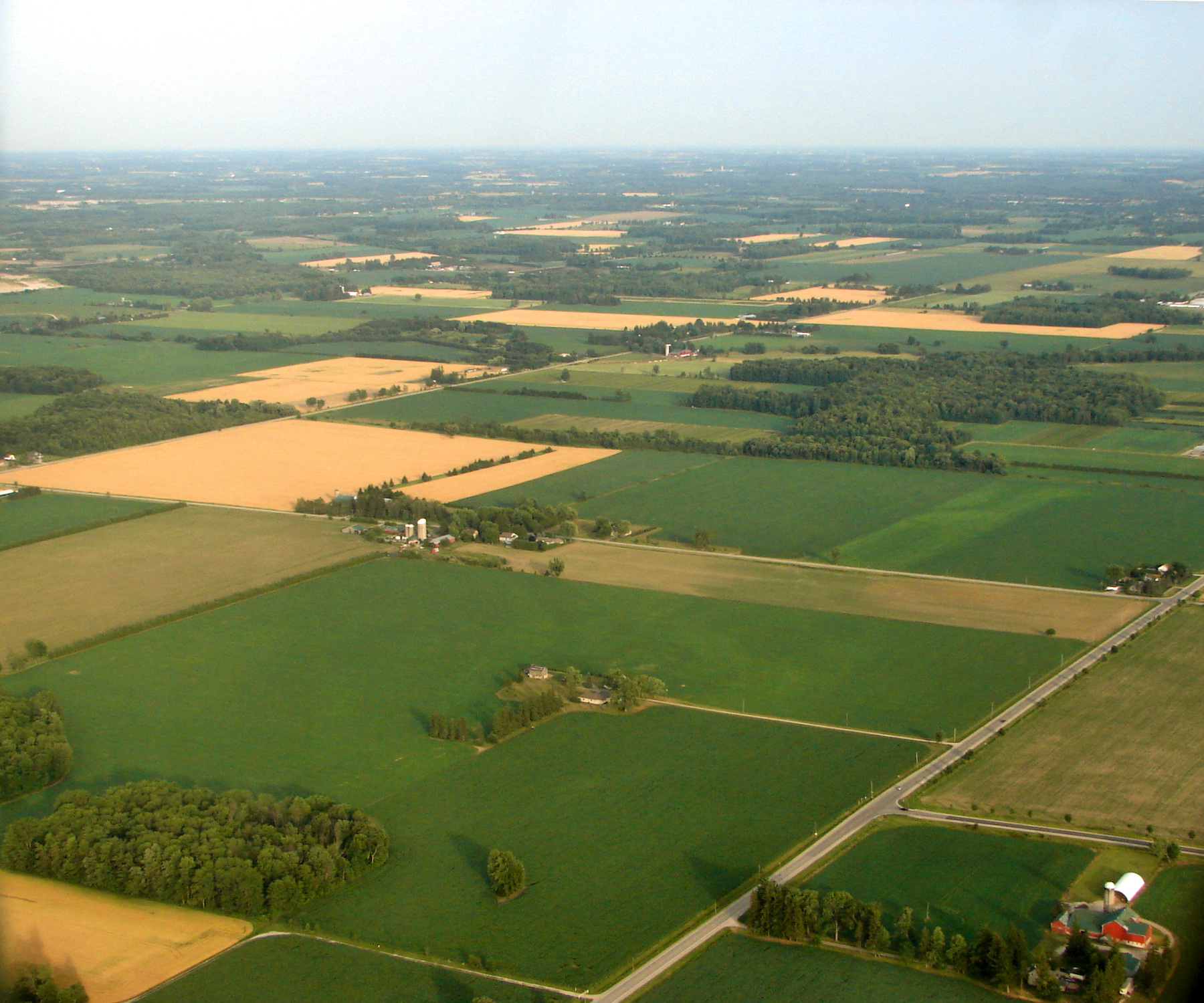

- Location within Southern Ontario
- Coordinates: 43°02′N 81°05′W
- Country: Canada
- Province: Ontario
- County: Middlesex
- Formed: January 1, 2001

Government
  - Mayor: Michelle Smibert
  - Federal riding: Middlesex—London
  - Prov. riding: Elgin—Middlesex—London

Area
  - Land: 433.95 km^{2} (167.55 sq mi)

Population (2016)
  - Total: 13,191
  - Density: 30.4/km^{2} (79/sq mi)
- Time zone: UTC-5 (EST)
  - Summer (DST): UTC-4 (EDT)
- Postal Code: N0L
- Area codes: 519 and 226
- Website: www.thamescentre.on.ca

Thames Centre is a municipality in Middlesex County, Ontario, Canada, directly east of the City of London. It was formed on January 1, 2001, when the townships of West Nissouri and North Dorchester were amalgamated. It is part of the London census metropolitan area.

Thames Centre includes the Degree Confluence of 43N 81W.

== Communities ==
Communities in the township include: Avon, Belton, Cherry Grove, Crampton, Cobble Hill, Derwent, Devizes, Dorchester, Evelyn, Fanshawe Lake, Friendly Corners, Gladstone, Harrietsville, Kelly Station, Mossley, Nilestown, Oliver, Putnam, Salmonville, Silvermoon, Thorndale (mayor - John Fluttert), Three Bridges, and Wellburn.

=== Dorchester ===
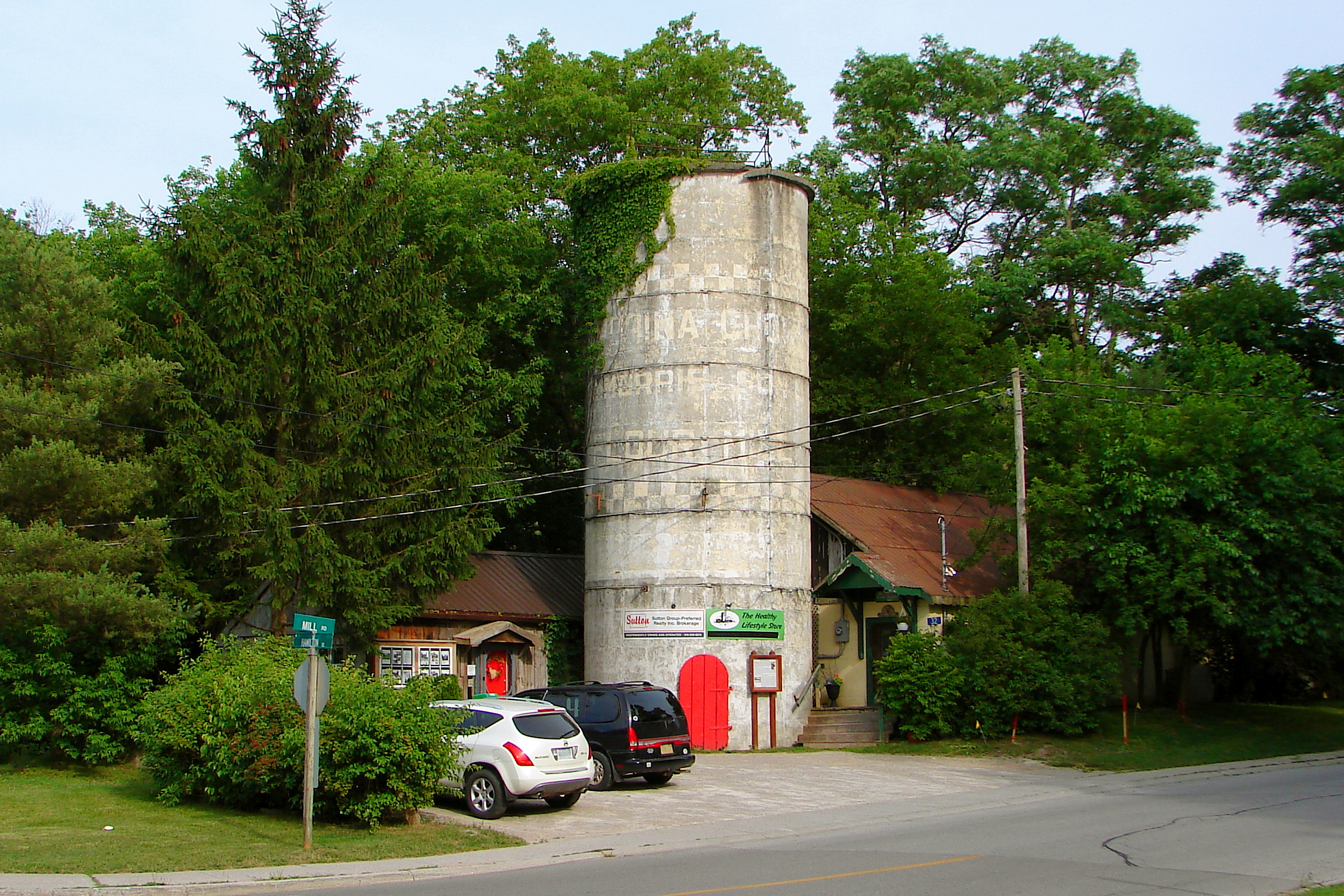
Dorchester

Dorchester is the residential and commercial core of the township.

== Demographics ==
In the 2021 Census of Population conducted by Statistics Canada, Thames Centre had a population of 13,980 living in 5,186 of its 5,316 total private dwellings, a change of 6% from its 2016 population of 13,191. With a land area of 433.99 km^{2} (167.56 sq mi), it had a population density of 32.2/km^{2} (83.4/sq mi) in 2021.

Canada census – Thames Centre community profile

	2016	2011
Population	13,191 (+1.5% from 2011)	13,000 (-0.6% from 2006)
Land area	433.99 km^{2} (167.56 sq mi)	433.95 km^{2} (167.55 sq mi)
Population density	30.4/km^{2} (79/sq mi)	30.0/km^{2} (78/sq mi)
Median age	45.1 (M: 45.1, F: 45.1)	43.9 (M: 43.9, F: 43.9)
Private dwellings	5,162 (total)	4,836 (total)
Median household income	$94,906

References: 2016 2011

Thames Centre population history
Year	Pop.	±%
1996	12,126	—
2001	12,473	+2.9%
2006	13,085	+4.9%
2011	13,000	−0.6%
2016	13,191	+1.5%

== See also ==
- Lake Whitaker
- List of townships in Ontario
