= Middlesex County, Ontario =

Middlesex County
- County (upper-tier)
- County of Middlesex
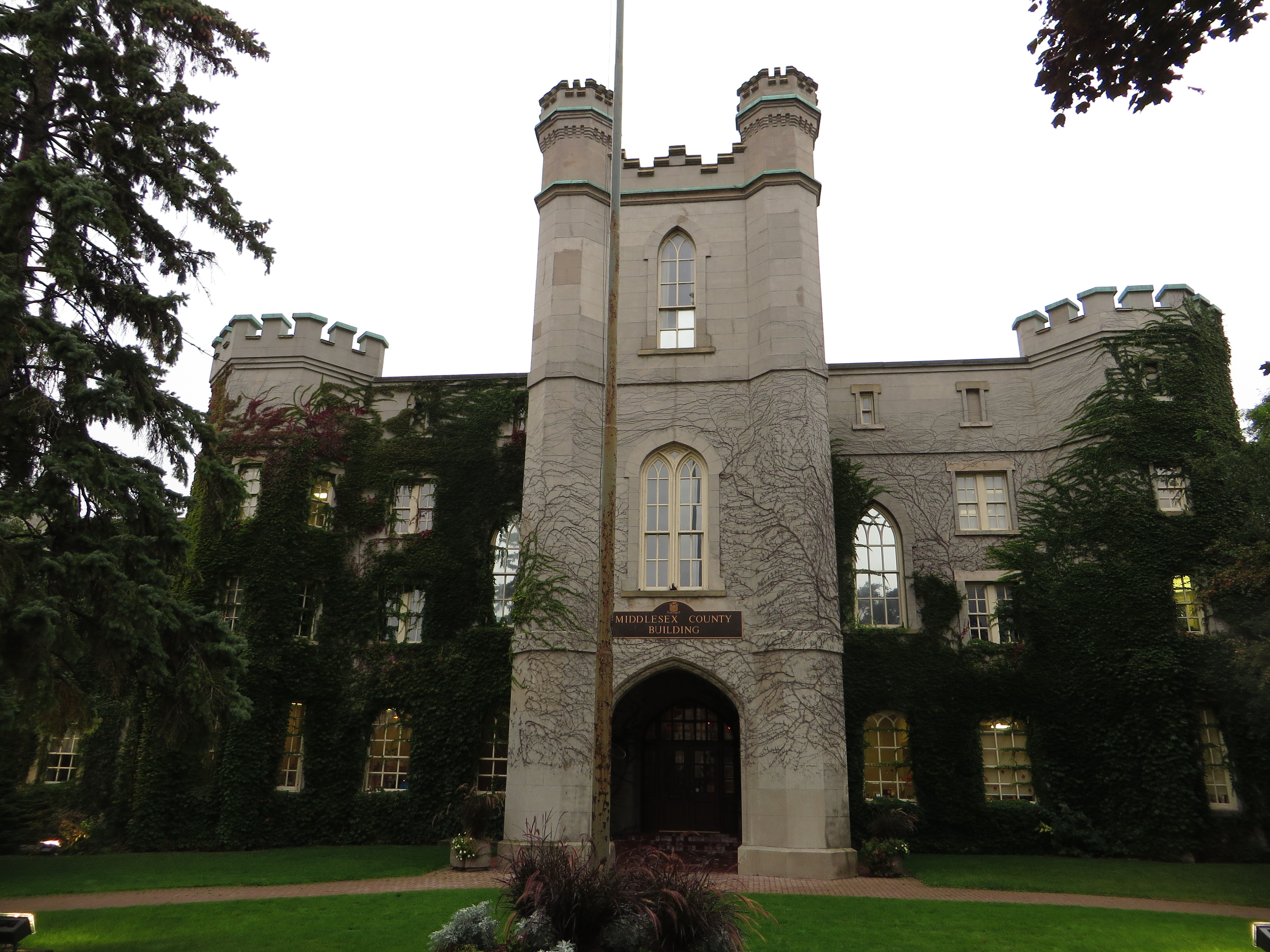
- Middlesex County courthouse, London
- Motto(s): Perseverance, Stability, and Integrity

- Location of Middlesex census division
- Coordinates: 43°00′N 81°30′W
- Country: Canada
- Province: Ontario
- Named for: Middlesex, England
- County seat: London
- Municipalities: List: Adelaide-Metcalfe; Lucan Biddulph; Middlesex Centre; Newbury; North Middlesex; Southwest Middlesex; Strathroy-Caradoc; Thames Centre

Area
  - Land: 2,897.26 km^{2} (1,118.64 sq mi)
  - Census division: 3,317.76 km^{2} (1,280.99 sq mi)
- Land area excludes London

Population (2021)
  - Total: 78,239
  - Density: 27/km^{2} (70/sq mi)
  - Census division: 500,563
  - Census division density: 150.9/km^{2} (391/sq mi)
- Total excludes London
- Time zone: UTC-5 (EST)
  - Summer (DST): UTC-4 (EDT)
- Website: www.county.middlesex.on.ca

Middlesex County is a primarily rural county and census division in Southwestern Ontario, Canada. Landlocked, the county is bordered by Huron and Perth counties on the north, Oxford County on the east, Elgin County on the south, and Chatham-Kent and Lambton County on the west.

The county seat is the city of London, although the city is politically independent from the county. The Middlesex census division, which consists of the county together with the City of London and three First Nations reserves, had a population of 500,563 in 2021. Part of the county is also included in the London census metropolitan area.

== Administrative divisions ==
Middlesex County is composed of eight incorporated municipalities (in order of population):

- Strathroy-Caradoc, Township of
  - Population centres: Strathroy and Mount Brydges. Other communities: Cairngorm, Campbellvale, Caradoc, Christina, Falconbridge, Glen Oak, Longwood, Melbourne (part) and Muncey.
- Middlesex Centre, Municipality of
  - Population centre: Ilderton. Other communities: Arva, Ballymote, Birr, Bryanston, Coldstream, Delaware, Denfield, Duncrief, Elginfield, Ettrick, Ivan, Kilworth, Komoka, Littlewood, Lobo, Lobo Siding, Maple Grove, Melrose, Poplar Hill, Sharon, Southgate, Southwold, Telfer and Vanneck.
- Thames Centre, Municipality of (township)
  - Population centres: Dorchester and Thorndale. Other communities: Avon, Belton, Cherry Grove, Crampton, Cobble Hill, Derwent, Devizes, Evelyn, Fanshawe Lake, Friendly Corners, Gladstone, Harrietsville, Kelly Station, Mossley, Nilestown, Oliver, Plover Mills, Putnam, Salmonville, Silvermoon, Three Bridges and Wellburn.
- North Middlesex, Municipality of (township)
  - Population centre: Parkhill. Other communities: Ailsa Craig, Beechwood, Bornish, Bowood, Brinsley, Carlisle, Corbett, Greenway, Hungry Hollow, Lieury, Moray, Mount Carmel, Nairn, Sable, Springbank, Sylvan and West McGillivray.
- Southwest Middlesex, Municipality of (township)
  - Population centre: Glencoe. Other communities: Appin, Ekfrid, Lewis Corners, Macksville, Mayfair, Melbourne (part), Newbury Station, North Appin Station, North Ekfrid, North Glencoe Station, Riverside, Strathburn, Tate Corners, Wardsville and Woodgreen.
- Lucan Biddulph, Township
  - Population centre: Lucan. Other communities: Biddulph, Clandeboye and Granton.
- Adelaide Metcalfe, Township
  - Communities: Adelaide, Crathie, Dejong, Kerwood, Keyser, Mullifarry, Napier, Napperton, Springfield, Walkers and Wrightmans Corners.
- Newbury, Village

First Nations reserves are located within the Middlesex census division but separate from Middlesex County:

- Chippewas of the Thames 42
- Munsee-Delaware 1
- Oneida 41.

== History ==
The area was originally organized as Suffolk County, created in July 1792 by Governor John Simcoe of Upper Canada by his first proclamation issued at Kingston, which also defined it as a constituency for the purposes of returning a member to the new Legislative Assembly of Upper Canada, and was described as having the following territory:

... bounded on the east by the county of Norfolk, on the south by lake Erie, until it meets the carrying-place from point au Pins unto the Thames, on the west by the said carrying-place, thence up the said river Thames until it meets the northwesternmost boundary of the county of Norfolk.

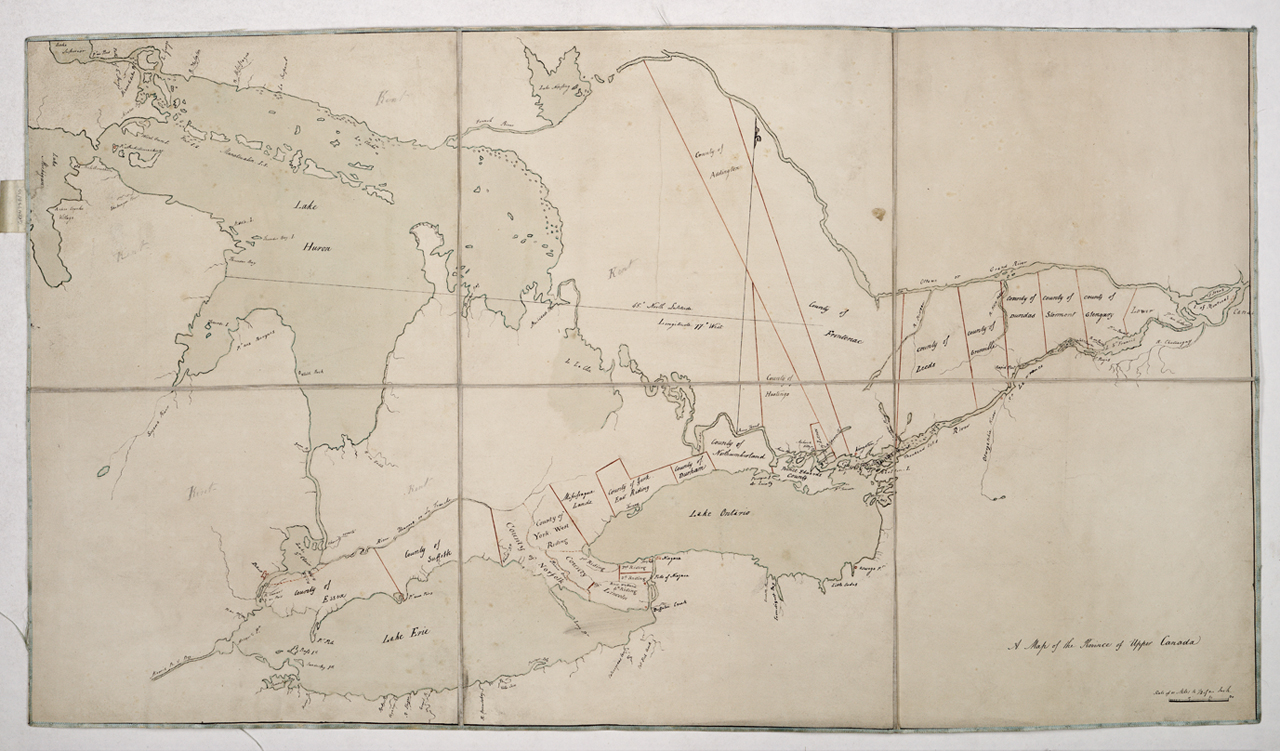
Map of Upper Canada showing 1792 division into counties and ridings

Simcoe toured the southwestern portion of the province's territory in early 1793 and concluded that the lower forks of the Thames would be best suited as the future site of the provincial capital. The names London in Middlesex were considered more appropriate for this. Suffolk County was reorganized as Middlesex County, as part of the London District, in 1798 by the Legislative Assembly of Upper Canada, consisting of the townships of London, Westminster, Dorchester, Yarmouth, Southwold, Dunwich, Aldborough and Delaware.

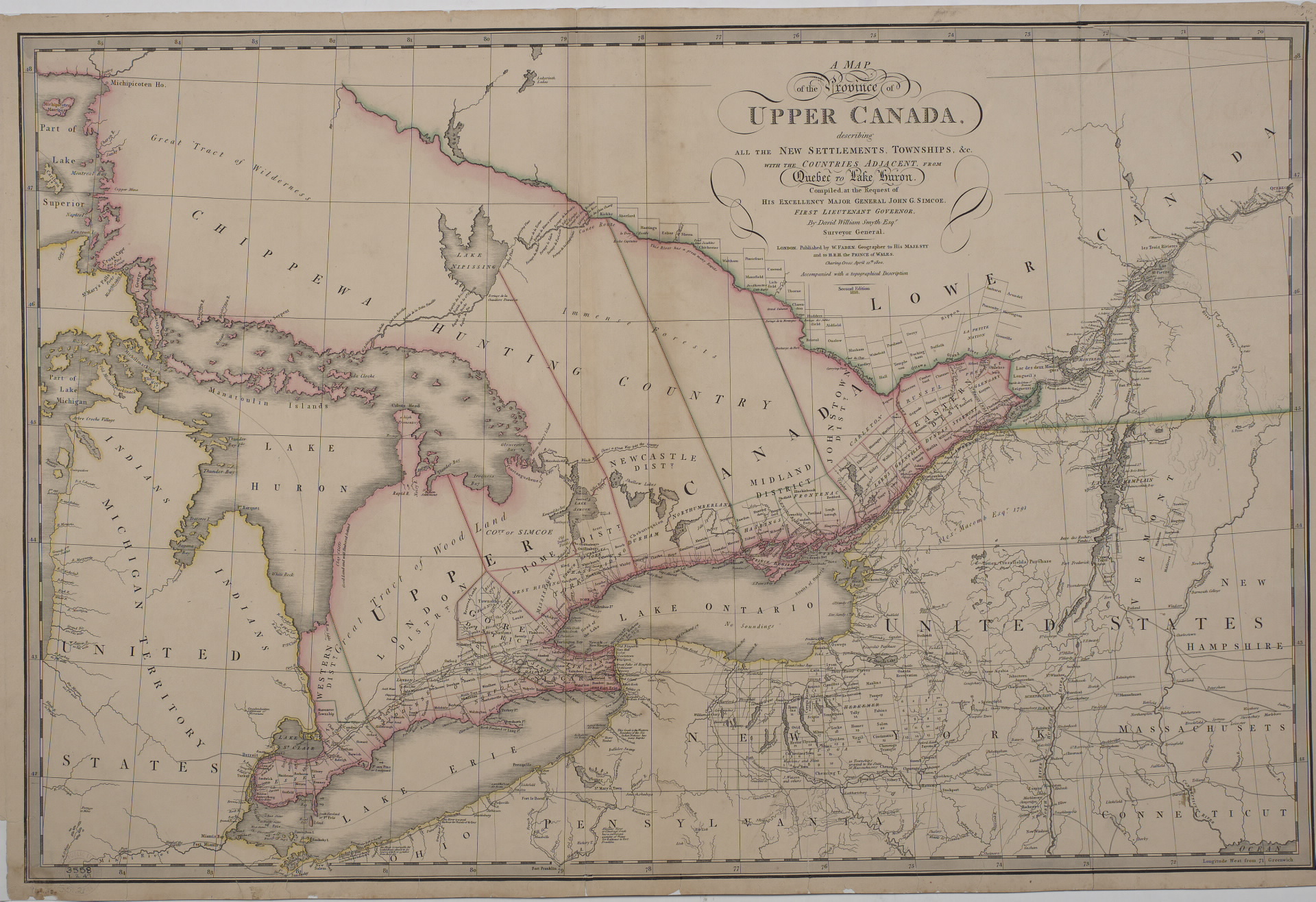
Map of Upper Canada showing 1798 division into districts, counties and townships (published 1818)

Middlesex County was expanded several times thereafter, starting in 1821 with the addition of the townships of Moza, Ecfrid (sic), Carradoc (sic) and Lobo. Adelaide Township came from the Huron Tract in 1835, and Williams Township was withdrawn from Huron County and annexed to Middlesex in 1845. In 1837, Bayham and Malahide Townships were transferred to Middlesex from Norfolk County. Metcalfe Township was formed from the north part of Ekfrid and the south part of Adelaide in 1845.

Upon the abolition of the London District in January 1850, Middlesex County was constituted for municipal purposes. The County was reorganized as the United Counties of Middlesex and Elgin in 1851, with its townships divided thus:

Creation of the United Counties of Middlesex and Elgin (1851)
Elgin County	Middlesex County
Aldborough; Dunwich; Southwold; Yarmouth; Malahide; Bayham; South Dorchester (Note: divided in 1851 (1851 Act, Sch. D))	Mosa; Ekfrid; Carradoc (sic); Metcalfe; Adelaide; Williams; Lobo; Nissouri West (Note: separated from Nissouri Township of Oxford County (1851 Act, Sch. D)); North Dorchester; Delaware; Westminster; London

Elgin County was separated from Middlesex in September 1853.

The townships of Biddulph and McGillivray were withdrawn from Huron County and annexed to Middlesex in 1862. There was a village at Ekfrid Station that had a blacksmith's shop, a gristmill and a store that was created by the Grand Truck railroad. Today it is ghost town as the post office closed on 31 January 1914 and the railroad station in 1950. Another settlement existed at Mayfair that was founded in 1854. By the 1880s, Mayfair had a tavern, two cheese factories, a sawmill, a blacksmith, a painter, a tailor, and a large house called Mayfair Castle that had marble imported from Italy. Mayfair Castle costed $7,000 to build at a time when the average brick house costed $1,000 to build. The post office closed in 1914; today, Mayfair is a ghosttown, with only the former Baptist Church and Mayfair Castle still standing. In 1829, a hamlet was founded at Strathburn that had a school by 1840. A church was founded in 1844 and a post office opened in 1852. By 1963, Strathburn had become a ghost town with only home inhabited and all the rest abandoned..

The historic townships of the County (including those originally part of Huron County marked in red) are shown below:

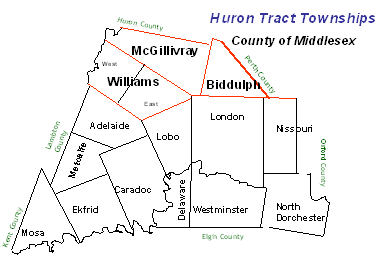
Townships of Middlesex County

=== Withdrawal and evolution of the City of London ===
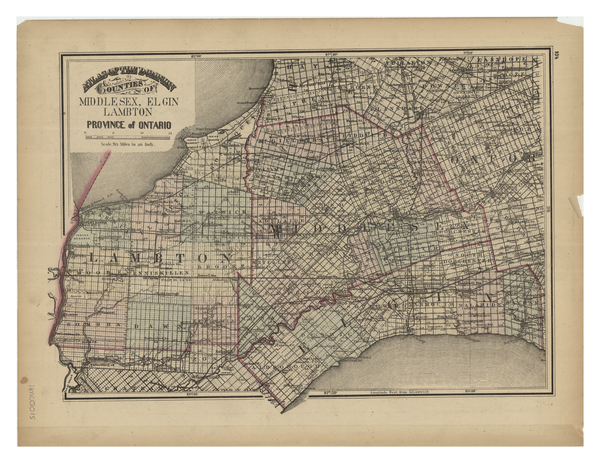
Historical map that includes Middlesex County (1875)

London, when it became a city in 1855, separated from Middlesex County, and it expanded later in stages:

Annexations to the City of London
Year	Community
1885	London East
1890	Wortley Village
1897	London West (Note: previously known as Petersville or Kensington)
1912	Pottersburg; Knollwood; Ealing; Chelsea Green
1961	Byron; Broughdale; Masonville
1993	Lambeth; Westminster; Glanworth; Hyde Park; Crumlin; Fanshawe; Brockley; Scottsville; Tempo

== Demographics ==
As a census division in the 2021 Census of Population conducted by Statistics Canada, Middlesex County had a population of 500,563 living in 204,157 of its 216,736 total private dwellings, a change of 9.9% from its 2016 population of 455,526. With a land area of 3,317.76 km^{2} (1,280.99 sq mi), it had a population density of 150.9/km^{2} (390.8/sq mi) in 2021.

Middlesex County has 38,231 people over the age of 15, with 45% of them working in the same municipality as the one they live in. That implies that more than 50% of them commute to other municipalities.

Historical census populations – Middlesex County (census division)

Year	Pop.	±%
1921	106,865	—
1931	118,241	+10.6%
1941	127,166	+7.5%
1951	162,139	+27.5%
1956	190,897	+17.7%
1961	221,422	+16.0%

Year	Pop.	±%
1966	249,403	+12.6%
1971	282,014	+13.1%
1976	303,745	+7.7%
1981	318,184	+4.8%
1986	332,471	+4.5%
1991	372,274	+12.0%

Year	Pop.	±%
1996	389,616	+4.7%
2001	403,185	+3.5%
2006	422,333	+4.7%
2011	439,151	+4.0%
2016	455,526	+3.7%
2021	500,563	+9.9%

Includes London. Population counts are not adjusted for boundary changes.
Source: Statistics Canada

== Municipal government ==
Members of the County Council are the mayors (or reeves) of the municipalities of Adelaide Metcalfe, Lucan Biddulph, Middlesex Centre, North Middlesex, Southwest Middlesex, Strathroy-Caradoc and Thames Centre as well as the Village of Newbury. Centres with a population exceeding 5,000 also get an additional seat for their deputy mayors. The head of council is one of its members who is elected as reeve for a one year term by the councillors.

== See also ==
- List of municipalities in Ontario
- List of townships in Ontario
- List of secondary schools in Ontario#Middlesex County
