= Old East Village =

- Neighbourhood
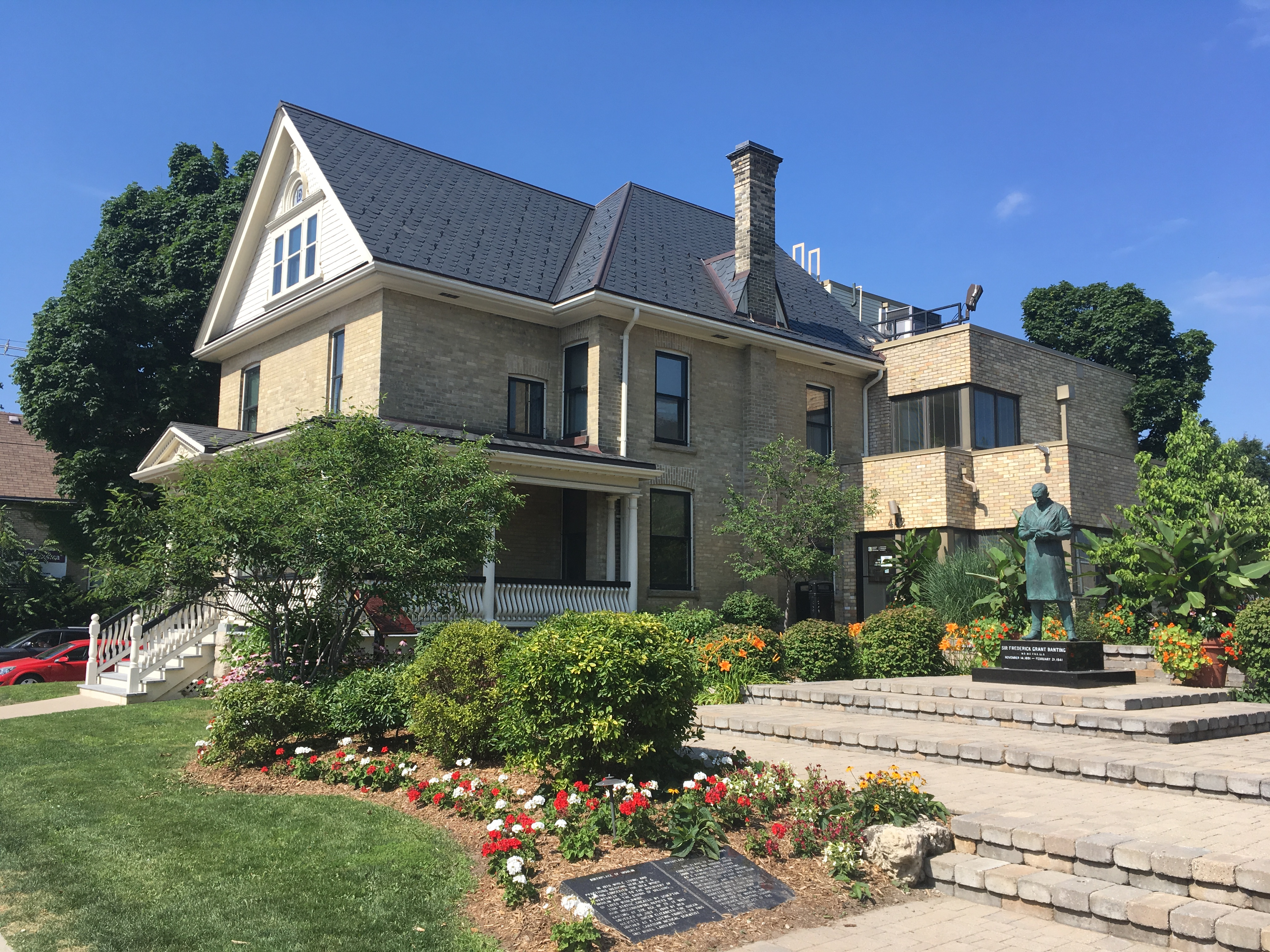
- Banting House, which is located in Old East Village

- Location in Ontario
- Coordinates: 43°02′16″N 81°17′07″W
- Country: Canada
- Province: Ontario
- City: London

Government
  - MP: Peter Fragiskatos (London Centre)
  - MPP: Terence Kernaghan (London North Centre)
  - Councillor: Susan Stevenson (Ward 4)

Population (2021)
  - Total: 11,250
- Time zone: UTC-5 (Eastern Time Zone)
  - Summer (DST): UTC-6 (Eastern Time Zone)
- Postal Code: N5V, N5W
- Area codes: 519, 226

Old East Village is a neighbourhood in the city of London, Ontario, Canada. A historic area of the city, it was designated as an Ontario Heritage Conservation District in 2006.

== History ==
Old East Village is in the eastern part of the city. The area was formerly home to thousands of jobs before the closure of the Kellogg's and McCormick & Company factories. The majority of the homes constructed in this historic neighbourhood were built in the 19th and early 20th century. However, in recent years, apartment buildings have been constructed in Old East Village. The majority of the commercial activities in the neighbourhood are located on and around Dundas St.

For recreation, Old East Village is the home of the Western Fair and the broader Western Fair District. The former Kellogg's factory is now an indoor playground and entertainment centre called The Factory. The Factory is also home to a Hard Rock Hotel branch. Old East Village also houses Banting House, a museum dedicated to Canadian pharmacologist Frederick Banting. It is also a hub for the London Transit Commission. Parks in the area include Queens Park and Boyle Park. The neighbourhood hosts numerous events that are organized by the Old East Village Business Improvement Area.

With a population of 11,250 as per the 2021 Canadian Census, Old East Village has an almost even divide between men and women. Most of its population is between the ages of 15 and 64 years old.

== Government and politics ==
Federally, Old East Village has been represented by the eastern riding of London Centre. A Liberal Party of Canada stronghold, the riding has been represented by Liberal Peter Fragiskatos since the 2015 Canadian federal election.

Provincially, Old East Village has been represented by the eastern riding of London North Centre. A Ontario New Democratic Party stronghold, the riding has been represented by the NDP's Terence Kernaghan since the 2018 Ontario general election.

Municipally, Old East Village has been represented by Susan Stevenson at London City Council since the 2022 London, Ontario, municipal election.

== Education ==
The neighbourhood is home to multiple elementary and secondary schools, including:

- St. Mary Choir Catholic School (London District Catholic School Board)
- East Carling Public School (Thames Valley District School Board)
- H. B. Beal Secondary School (London District Catholic School Board)
- London Central Secondary School (Thames Valley District School Board)
- Catholic Central High School (London District Catholic School Board)
