= Matthew Prince =

American business executive (born 1974)

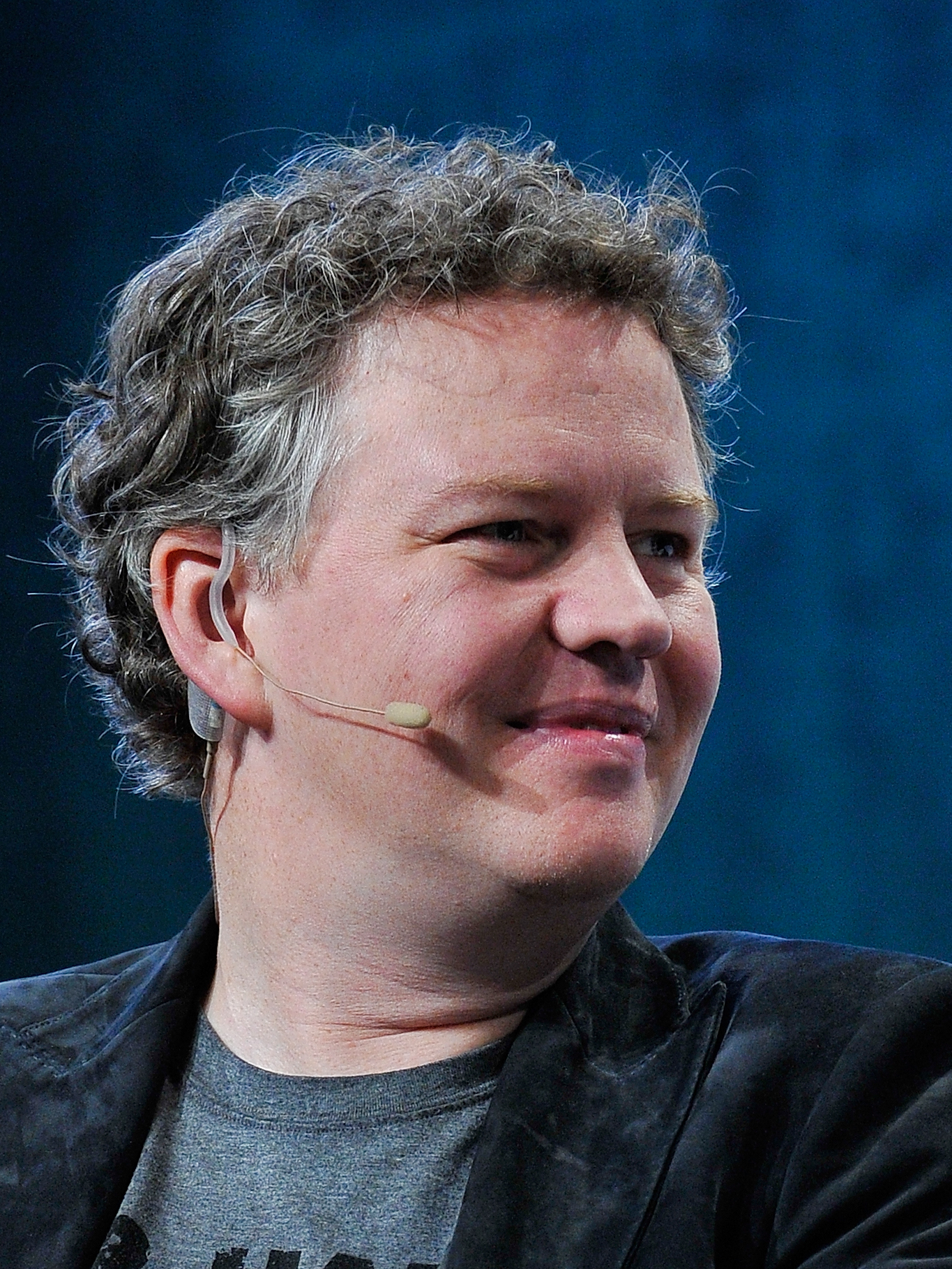
- Prince in September 2015
- Born: Matthew Browning Prince; November 13, 1974 (age 51); Salt Lake City, Utah, U.S.
- Education: Trinity College, Connecticut (BA); University of Chicago (JD); Harvard University (MBA)
- Occupation: Businessperson
- Title: Co-founder, co-chair and CEO of Cloudflare
- Spouse: Tatiana Lingos-Webb
- Children: 1
- Relatives: John Browning (great-great grandfather)

Matthew Browning Prince (born November 13, 1974) is an American businessman and executive. He is the co-founder, executive chairman, and chief executive officer of the technology company Cloudflare. With a net worth of US$5.5 billion as of February 2025, Prince is the wealthiest person in Utah.

Prince began teaching at University of Illinois Chicago School of Law when the CAN-SPAM Act of 2003 passed, inspiring him to found Unspam and Project Honey Pot, an open source data collection software. In 2009, he created Cloudflare with Harvard Business School alumnus Michelle Zatlyn and Project Honey Pot co-founder Lee Holloway.

== Early life and education ==
Matthew Prince was born on November 13, 1974, at the University of Utah in Salt Lake City, Utah, and raised in Park City. His father, John Browning Prince, is a former journalist, restaurateur, and owned a stock brokerage firm, while his mother owned several gift stores; in high school, Prince worked for his mother. The Prince family, who have resided in Park City for multiple generations, assisted in the construction of various buildings in Park City, such as the Parleys Summit Ski Resort, the Stein Eriksen Lodge Deer Valley, and the Yarrow Hotel. Prince's great-great-great grandfather was Jonathan Browning, whose son, John Browning, designed Browning Auto-5—the first semi-automatic shotgun, the M2 Browning, and the M1911 pistol. When he was seven, Prince received an Apple II Plus for Christmas. Prince's mother would sneak him into computer science classes at the University of Utah. He attended Rowland Hall-St. Mark's School in 1988. In Park City, he worked as an assistant ski instructor.

In 1996, Prince graduated from Trinity College with a Bachelor of Arts, majoring in English literature and minoring in computer science. There, he was the editor-in-chief of The Trinity Tripod. As a freshman, he co-created the online-only magazine The Trincoll Journal with Peter Adams and Paul Tesco. He then was graduated from the University of Chicago Law School in 2000 with a J.D. degree and from Harvard Business School in 2009 with a Master of Business Administration as a George F. Baker Scholar.

== Business career ==
=== Early career ===
While pursuing a degree from the University of Chicago, Prince worked at Latham & Watkins, and upon graduating, he worked for the online insurance company GroupWorks. In 2003, Prince began teaching cyberlaw at the University of Illinois Chicago School of Law. He co-wrote a paper on the CAN-SPAM Act of 2003 following its passage in the UIC John Marshall Journal of Information Technology & Privacy Law. The creation of the National Do Not Call Registry through the CAN-SPAM Act inspired Prince to create Unspam, a spam-prevention software for email. Prince co-founded Unspam Technologies, which supported the development of Project Honey Pot, an open source data collection software created by Prince and Lee Holloway designed to gather information on IP addresses used by email-address harvesting services.

=== Cloudflare ===
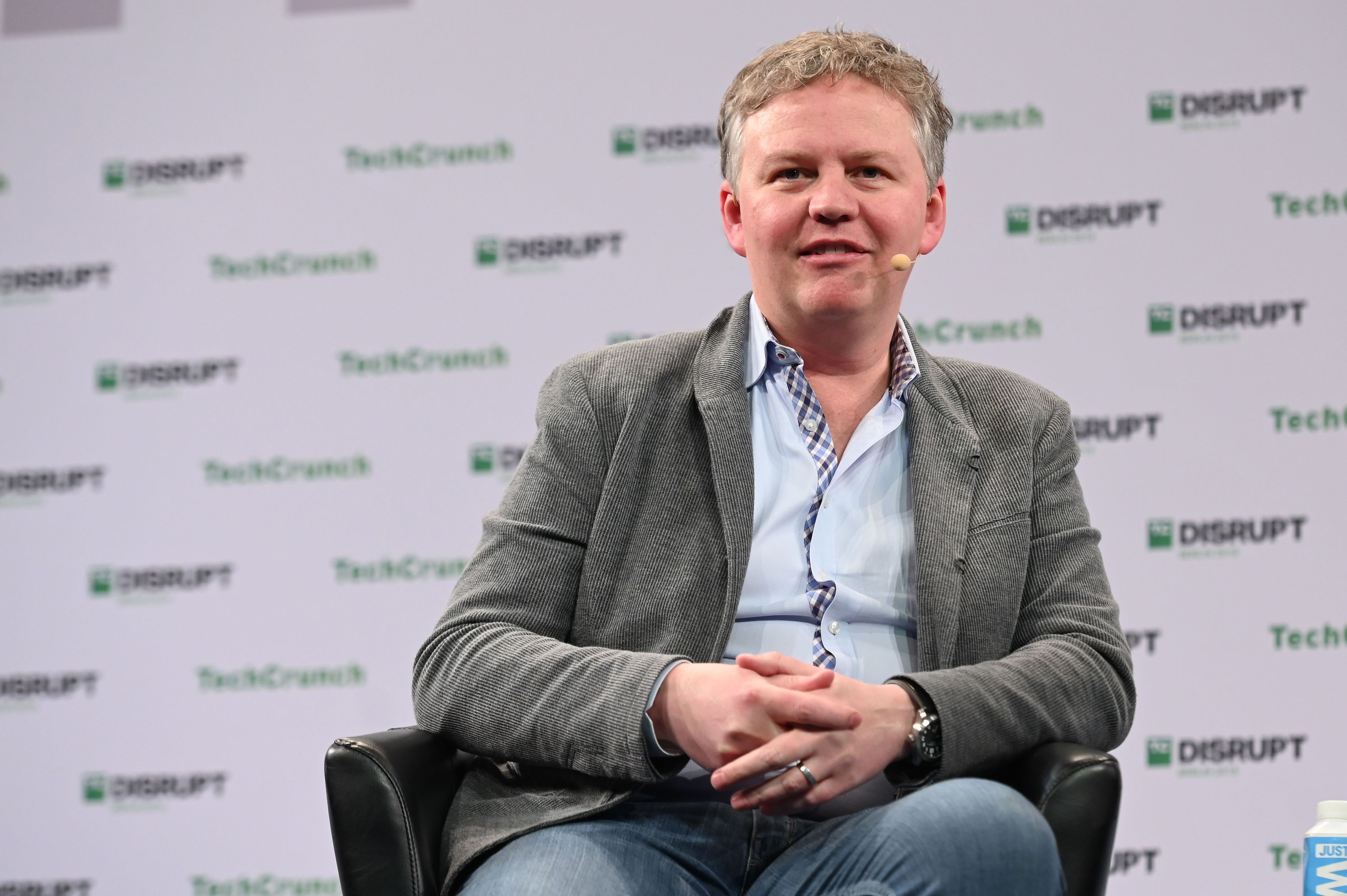
Matthew Prince speaking on stage at TechCrunch Disrupt Berlin in 2019

In 2008, the Department of Homeland Security (DHS) contacted Unspam Technologies, asking, "Do you have any idea how valuable the data you have is?" The DHS' email served as the impetus for Cloudflare, a technology company Prince co-founded with Holloway and fellow Harvard Business School graduate Michelle Zatlyn the following year. Cloudflare's team won the Dubilier Prize from Harvard Business School, receiving a total of US$50,000 in cash.

Prince's personal information was leaked in 2012 and used by the hacker group UGNazi to facilitate a DNS hijacking attack against 4chan. UGNazi were able to forward Prince's AT&T phone number to a Google Voice number using a Social Security number the group purchased for several dollars. The transfer allowed the group to receive a two-factor authentication code for Prince's personal Gmail account, which he used as a backup for his corporate account, and were able to redirect 4chan to UGNazi's Twitter account. According to group member Eric Taylor, Prince was warned of the attack a day before it occurred through an AT&T relay; Prince confirmed that he received several calls from an AT&T relay. Within a day, Cloudflare had identified three members of the group, who were also customers of Cloudflare. In 2014, Prince's house was searched by a SWAT team after a spoofed number called 9-1-1 claiming that someone had a gun in his house.

Cloudflare received significant attention for providing service to the Chechen news site Kavkaz Center. The Kernel journalist James Cook contacted Cloudflare about the site, sharing the email with editor-in-chief Milo Yiannopoulos, to which Prince responded by writing a blog post rebuking the email's content and writing, "A website is speech. It is not a bomb." He spoke out against National Security Agency gag orders in September 2013. Despite maintaining a free speech stance, Prince personally suspended service for the neo-Nazi website The Daily Stormer. An internal email by Prince and obtained by Gizmodo said that he felt compelled to act after users of The Daily Stormer began boasting that Cloudflare was "one of them". In a blog post, he later stated that suspending service opens sites open to distributed denial of service (DDoS) attacks. According to a 2019 article by The Atlantic, the suspension happened because the site published an article celebrating the murder of Heather Heyer. Prince defended suspending Kiwi Farms' service in September 2022 after the site engaged in a harassment campaign against Twitch streamer Clara Sorrenti in August of that year.

=== The Park Record ===
In March 2023, Prince and his wife Tatiana acquired the newspaper The Park Record from Ogden Newspapers and now provides digital articles for free. The Princes intend on converting the newspaper into a non-profit or public benefit corporation and adding Spanish-language coverage.

== Personal life ==
Prince and his wife Tatiana (née Lingos-Webb) reside in Park City, Utah. They have a daughter. According to Forbes, Prince has a net worth of US$2.3 billion as of March 2023, making him the second wealthiest person in Utah behind Gail Miller. He is a World Economic Forum Technology Pioneer and a member of the Council on Foreign Relations.

In October 2022, Prince's representatives had asked Park City planners for permission to tear down a 7,000 square feet (650 m^{2}) main house and guest house Prince owned on King Road and build a mansion, guest house, pool, and parking garage in their place. The blueprints would approach Treasure Hill, a US$64 million open space purchased by taxpayers in 2019. The matter came before the planning commission. On the same day language was added to a Senate bill that would allow Prince to tear down the houses without involvement from the committee, Prince hired lobbyist Lincoln Shurtz. The legislation failed in the House of Representatives.
