= London North Centre =

London North Centre may refer to the following electoral districts in Canada:

- London North Centre (federal electoral district)
- London North Centre (provincial electoral district)
