= Eriksen =

Eriksen may refer to:

- Eriksen (surname)
- Eriksen (duo), a Norwegian duo made up of Rita Eriksen and Frank Eriksen

== See also ==
- Eriksen flanker task
- Stein Eriksen Lodge Botanical Garden
