= Truppe =

Truppe is a surname. Notable people with the surname include:

- Katharina Truppe (born 1996), Austrian skier
- Susan Truppe (born 1959), Canadian politician
