= Glen Pearson =

Canadian politician (born 1950)

Glen Pearson MP

Member of Parliament for London North Centre
- In office November 27, 2006 – May 2, 2011
- Preceded by: Joe Fontana
- Succeeded by: Susan Truppe

Personal details
- Born: December 26, 1950 (age 75) Calgary, Alberta
- Party: Liberal
- Spouse: Jane Roy
- Profession: Firefighter

Glen Douglas Pearson (born December 26, 1950) is a politician in Ontario, Canada. He is a former Member of Parliament for London North Centre, and is a member of the Liberal Party of Canada.

== Life and career ==
Pearson was born in Calgary, Alberta. He is a professional firefighter in London, Ontario, well known for his charitable and humanitarian activities. He retired as a captain in the London Fire Department, where he worked for 29 years, but he is perhaps better known as the co-executive director of the London Food Bank for over 25 years. He has also previously been involved in the Ontario Association of Food Banks as a board member, serving one term as Chairperson.

Since 1998, along with his wife, Jane Roy, Pearson has worked on human rights and development projects in Sudan. This work included building schools and infrastructure, general community development and campaigning against slavery.

On August 15, 2007, Pearson reunited his Sudanese born adoptive daughter, Abuk Roy, with her twin sister, Achan and brother Ater, who were previously thought to be dead.

== Politics ==
Pearson originally stood as the Liberal candidate in London—Fanshawe in the general election of January 23, 2006, losing to Irene Mathyssen of the New Democratic Party.

Following the resignation of Joe Fontana in London North Centre, he was elected in the resulting by-election on November 27, 2006. His closest competition was Green Party of Canada leader Elizabeth May, who received 26% of the vote.

His campaign emphasized environmental, health care and accountability issues.

He supported Stéphane Dion in the Liberal leadership election, and introduced him on the night of the candidate speeches.

Pearson was re-elected in the 2008 federal election, but was defeated by Conservative Susan Truppe when he ran for re-election in 2011.

== Electoral record ==
2011 Canadian federal election
Party	Candidate	Votes	%	±%	Expenditures
Conservative	Susan Truppe	19,468	36.96	+3.99	–
Liberal	Glen Pearson	17,803	33.80	-5.33	–
New Democratic	German Gutierrez	12,996	24.67	+7.20	–
Green	Mary Ann Hodge	2,177	4.13	-6.30	–
Animal Alliance	AnnaMaria Valastro	229	0.43	–	–
Total valid votes		52,673	100.00	–	
Total rejected ballots		231	0.44	+0.03	–
Turnout		52,904	59.69	–	
Eligible voters		88,624	–	–	

London North Centre - 2008 Canadian federal election
Party	Candidate	Votes	%	±%
Liberal	Glen Pearson	21,018	39.13%	+4.27%
Conservative	Paul Van Meerbergen	17,712	32.97%	+8.49%
New Democratic	Steve Holmes	9,387	17.47%	+3.39%
Green	Mary Ann Hodge	5,603	10.43%	-15.41%
Total valid votes		53,720		
Total rejected ballots		222		
Turnout		53,942		

Canadian federal by-election, November 27, 2006: London North Centre Resignation of Joe Fontana
Party	Candidate	Votes	%	±%
Liberal	Glen Pearson	13,287	34.85	−5.27
Green	Elizabeth May	9,864	25.87	+20.38
Conservative	Dianne Haskett	9,309	24.42	−5.48
New Democratic	Megan Walker	5,388	14.13	−9.62
Progressive Canadian	Steven Hunter	145	0.38	−0.09
Independent	Robert Ede	77	0.20	–
Canadian Action	Will Arlow	53	0.14	–
Total		38,123	100.00	

London—Fanshawe - 2006 Canadian federal election
Party	Candidate	Votes	%	±%
New Democratic	Irene Mathyssen	16,067		
Liberal	Glen Pearson	15,199		
Conservative	Dan Mailer	12,034		
Green	David McLaughlin	1803		
