= East Village =

East Village may refer to:

== Places ==
=== Canada ===
- East Village, Nova Scotia
- Downtown East Village, Calgary, Alberta
- Old East Village, London, Ontario

=== United Kingdom ===
- East Village, London, a housing development in Stratford

=== United States ===
- East Village, Connecticut, a census-designated place
- East Village, Des Moines, Iowa, a historical neighborhood
- East Village, Flint, a neighborhood on the East Side of Flint, Michigan
- East Village, Kansas City, a neighborhood in downtown Kansas City, Missouri
- East Village, Long Beach, California, a neighborhood
- East Village, Manhattan, a neighborhood in New York City
- East Village, San Diego, a neighborhood in downtown San Diego
- East Village, a neighborhood in the Lincoln Oval Village of Visalia, California
- East Village, the nickname/former name of East Longmeadow, Massachusetts

=== China ===
- Beijing East Village in China

=== In fiction ===
- East Village, Manitoba, a fictional town used in Miriam Toews's novels, based on her real life hometown of Steinbach, Manitoba

== Other uses ==
- East Village (band), a cult independent band from England

== See also ==
- East Villager, a former New York City monthly neighborhood newspaper
