= Michelle Zatlyn =

Canadian businesswoman (born 1979)

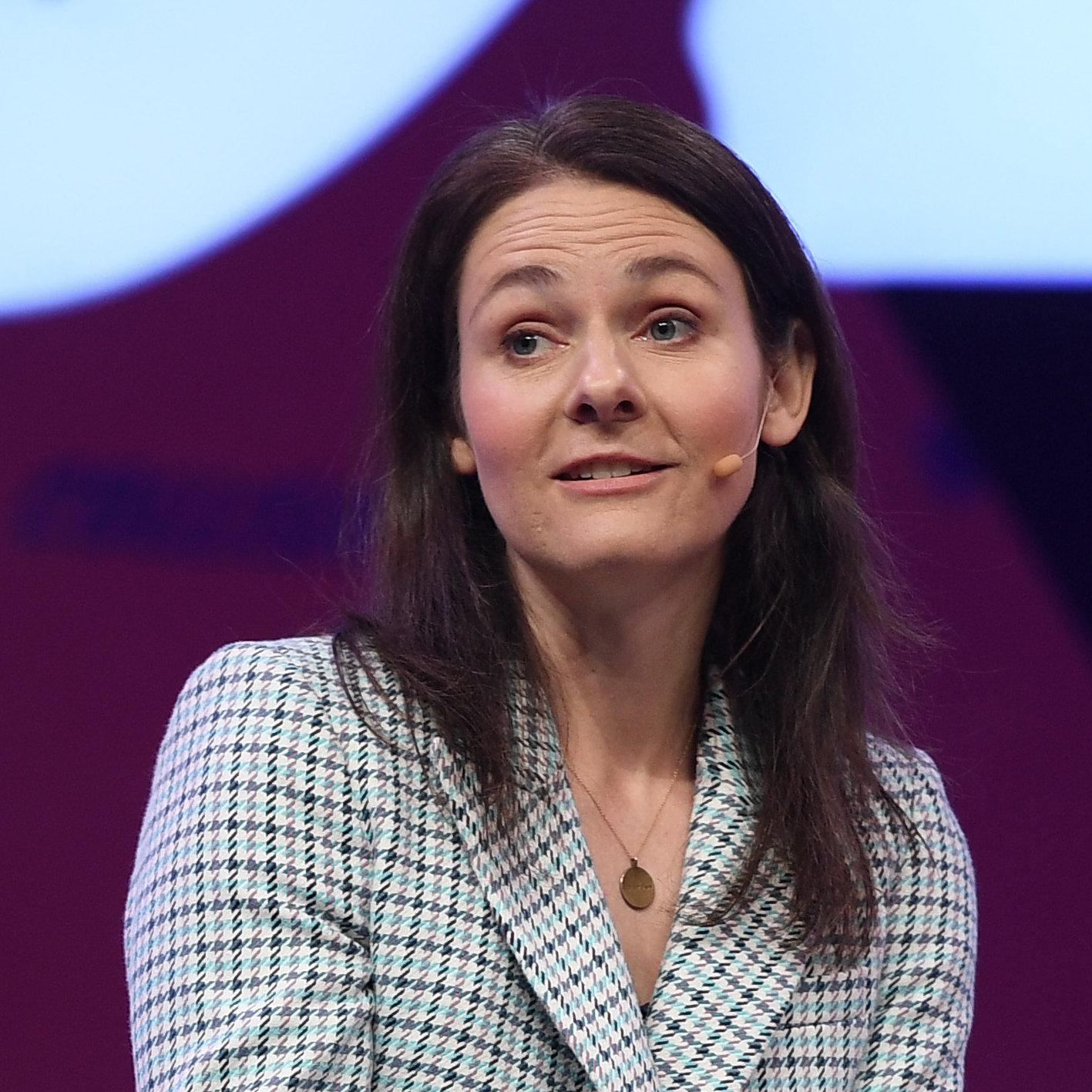
- Zatlyn in 2019
- Born: July 1979 (age 46); Prince Albert, Saskatchewan, Canada
- Education: McGill University (BS); Harvard University (MBA)
- Occupation: Entrepreneur
- Title: Co-founder, president, and COO of Cloudflare, Inc.
- Board member of: Cloudflare; Atlassian
- Children: 2

Michelle Zatlyn (born July 1979) is a Canadian businesswoman. She is the co-founder, president, and chief operating officer of American content delivery network provider and cybersecurity firm Cloudflare.

== Personal life and education ==
Michelle Zatlyn was born in July 1979 in Prince Albert, Saskatchewan, Canada where she grew up. She attended Carlton Comprehensive High School where she was once the captain of the basketball team. She graduated from McGill University with a Bachelor of Science degree in chemistry in 2001 and subsequently completed a Master of Business Administration (MBA) degree from Harvard Business School. Zatlyn is married and has two children. She lives in San Francisco.

== Career ==
After a summer internship at Google and a stint as a product manager at Toshiba, Zatlyn joined the founding team of Toronto-based startup I Love Rewards (later Achievers), a global employee rewards program. She co-founded Cloudflare with Harvard Business School classmates Matthew Prince and Lee Holloway in 2009. She sits on Cloudflare's board and serves as the company's president and COO.

Speaking about her co-founding of Cloudflare, Zatlyn states:

When we came up with Cloudflare, I knew nothing about internet security, but I care a lot about liking what I'm doing. I knew if I could help create internet security, that's something I could work hard for and be proud [of]; 10 years later, we have 165 data centres, 12 million domains and more than 800 employees.

Zatlyn was appointed to the board of directors for Australian software company, Atlassian, in September 2021. She is also a member of the cybersecurity team of Aspen Institute.

== Recognition ==
Zatlyn was named as one of Fortune magazine's "40 Under 40" (2017) and Forbes's "50 Self-Made Women" (2021); she was also nominated as C100's "Icon of Canadian Entrepreneurship" (2019). As of 2021, she is a member of the Young Global Leaders of the World Economic Forum. As of May 2025, Forbes estimated her net worth at US$1.6 billion. Zatlyn was also listed among the world's richest self-made women by Forbes in 2024.
