= Area 1 Security =

Cybersecurity company acquired by Cloudflare

- Type: Subsidiary
- Industry: Information security
- Founded: 2013; 13 years ago
- Founders: Oren Falkowitz; Phil Syme; Blake Darché
- Headquarters: Redwood City, California, U.S.
- Products: Area 1 Horizon
- Parent: Cloudflare
- Website: www.area1security.com

Area 1 Security, Inc. was an American cybersecurity company based in Redwood City, California which was acquired by Cloudflare in April 2022.

== History ==
Area 1 was incorporated in 2013 by Oren Falkowitz, Blake Darché, and Phil Syme, previously employees of the U.S. National Security Agency. The company received venture capital financing led by Kleiner Perkins.

In December 2018, Area 1 identified a Chinese government cyber campaign targeting more than 100 intergovernmental organizations, ministries of foreign affairs, ministries of finance, trade unions, and think tanks, which included breach of the European Union diplomatic communications network.

In 2019, the Federal Election Commission ruled in AO 2019-12 that Area 1 could "offer its services to federal candidates and political committees at the same 'low or no cost' tier that it offers to all qualified customers without making an impermissible in-kind contribution".

In January 2020, Area 1 revealed a Russian government phishing campaign targeting Burisma Holdings and its subsidiaries.

In February 2022, Cloudflare announced plans to acquire Area 1 for $162 million in a cash and stock deal. The acquisition was completed April 1.

== Service ==
Area 1 Horizon is a cloud-based service intended to mitigate phishing, ransomware, malware, watering holes, malvertising, and other social engineering threats, across email, web, and network, at the edge or in the cloud. The service is based on "a network of sensors on web servers around the globe, many known to be used by state-sponsored hackers."
