= Peter Fragiskatos =

Canadian politician (born 1981)

Peter Fragiskatos MP
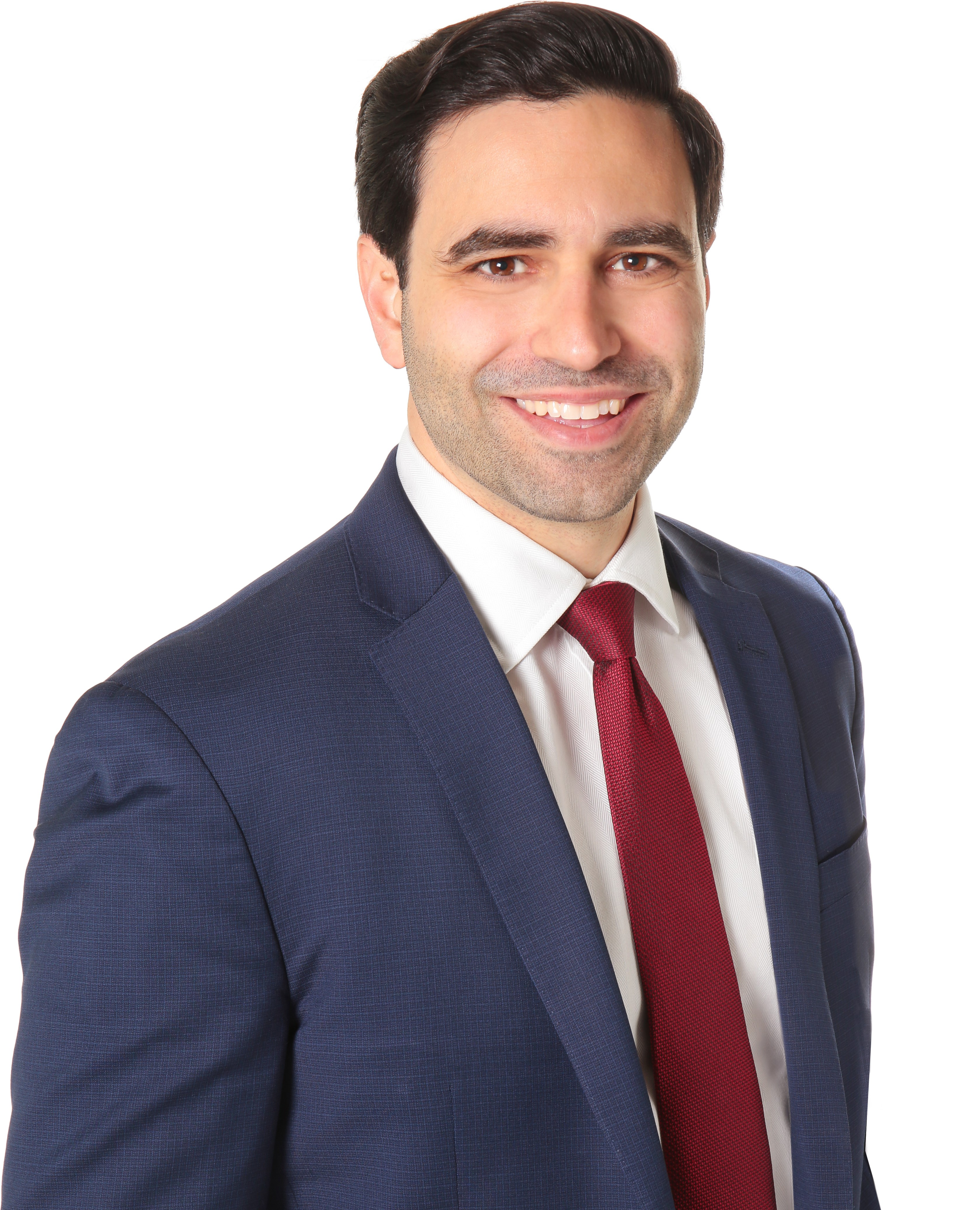
- Fragiskatos in 2019

Parliamentary Secretary to the Minister of Immigration, Refugees, and Citizenship
- Incumbent
- Assumed office June 5, 2025

Member of Parliament for London Centre London North Centre (2015-2025)
- Incumbent
- Assumed office October 19, 2015
- Preceded by: Susan Truppe

Parliamentary Secretary to the Minister of National Revenue
- In office December 3, 2021 – July 26, 2023
- Minister: Diane Lebouthillier
- Preceded by: Francesco Sorbara
- Succeeded by: Iqra Khalid

Personal details
- Born: April 30, 1981 (age 45) London, Ontario, Canada
- Party: Liberal Party of Canada
- Spouse: Katy Boychuk
- Children: 1
- Education: King's University College, University of Western Ontario; Queen's University; Cambridge University
- Profession: Academic

Peter Fragiskatos (born April 30, 1981) is a Canadian politician and academic who has served as the member of Parliament for the riding of London Centre since 2025. Previously, he represented London North Centre from 2015 to 2025. A member of the Liberal Party of Canada, he was first elected in the 2015 federal election and re-elected in the 2019, 2021, and 2025 federal elections.

== Early life and career ==
Fragiskatos' family is of Greek descent. His grandmother Panagiota emigrated from Greece following World War II, and later became an organizer for the New Democratic Party's leaders Tommy Douglas and Stephen Lewis. Fragiskatos later attributed his interest in politics and social justice to her. He attended King's University College at Western University (where he earned a Bachelor of Arts), Queen's University (Master of Arts), and finally the University of Cambridge (PhD), where his focus was on how insurgent organizations engage in political advocacy at the global level.

Prior to his election, Fragiskatos was a political science professor at Western University. He was a frequent commentator on international issues, and was published by Maclean's, The Globe and Mail, The Toronto Star, BBC News, and CNN.

== Federal politics ==
Fragiskatos was elected to represent the riding of London North Centre in the House of Commons in the 2015 federal election.

On October 21, 2019, Fragiskatos was re-elected in London North Centre during the 2019 federal election. On June 15, 2021, Prime Minister Justin Trudeau appointed Fragiskatos to the National Security and Intelligence Committee of Parliamentarians after he obtained the required top-secret security clearance.

The 2021 federal election, held on September 20, saw Fragiskatos re-elected to a third term.

In January 2025, Fragiskatos was one of many Liberal MPs to call on Trudeau to resign during the 2024–2025 Canadian political crisis. He was re-elected in the 2025 federal election.

=== Parliamentary roles ===
Since entering Parliament, Fragiskatos has served on several parliamentary committees, including Foreign Affairs and International Development, Public Safety and National Security, Finance, Canada–China Relations, and Public Accounts. He has also served as Parliamentary Secretary to the Minister of National Revenue, Parliamentary Secretary to the Minister of Housing, Infrastructure and Communities, and, since 2025, Parliamentary Secretary to the Minister of Immigration, Refugees and Citizenship.

== Personal life ==
Fragiskatos lives in the riding of London North Centre with his wife, Katy, and his daughter, Ava.

== Electoral record ==
2025 Canadian federal election: London Centre
Party	Candidate	Votes	%	±%	Expenditures
Liberal	Peter Fragiskatos	33,999	56.74	+19.19	$126,009.25
Conservative	Stephen Gallant	18,633	31.09	+6.29	$49,739.11
New Democratic	Dirka Prout	5,790	9.66	–20.72	$86,592.30
Green	Mary Ann Hodge	878	1.47	–0.49	$2,655.80
People's	David Annis	523	0.87	–4.28	$496.68
Canadian Future	Bruce Lamb	100	0.2	N/A	$22.83
Total valid votes/expense limit		59,923	99.45	+0.25	$135,012.13
Total rejected ballots		329	0.55	–0.25	
Turnout		60,252	67.76	+5.18	
Eligible voters		88,924			
Liberal notional hold		Swing		+6.24	
Source: CBC, Elections Canada

2021 Canadian federal election: London North Centre
Party	Candidate	Votes	%	±%	Expenditures
Liberal	Peter Fragiskatos	22,921	39.1	−3.7	$113,155.98
Conservative	Stephen Gallant	15,889	27.1	+3.5	$41,974.20
New Democratic	Dirka Prout	15,611	26.6	+3.2	$50,557.41
People's	Marc Emery	2,902	5.0	+2.6	$7,075.62
Green	Mary Ann Hodge	1,297	2.2	−5.4	$3,699.64
Total valid votes		58,620	99.2		
Total rejected ballots		460	0.8		
Turnout		59,080	62.2		
Eligible voters		94,977			
Liberal hold		Swing		−3.6	
Source: Elections Canada

2019 Canadian federal election: London North Centre
Party	Candidate	Votes	%	±%	Expenditures
Liberal	Peter Fragiskatos	27,427	42.75	−7.71	$107,501.27
Conservative	Sarah Bokhari	15,066	23.64	−7.47	none listed
New Democratic	Dirka Prout	14,887	23.36	+8.69	none listed
Green	Carol Dyck	4,872	7.64	+4.09	$12,325.20
People's	Salim Mansur	1,532	2.40	—	$61,391.07
Communist	Clara Sorrenti	137	0.21	—	none listed
Total valid votes/expense limit		63,741	99.23		
Total rejected ballots		493	0.77	+0.35	
Turnout		64,234	65.52	−3.91	
Eligible voters		98,039			
Liberal hold		Swing		−0.12	
Source: Elections Canada

2015 Canadian federal election
Party	Candidate	Votes	%	±%	Expenditures
Liberal	Peter Fragiskatos	32,427	50.45	+16.22	$139,844.01
Conservative	Susan Truppe	19,990	31.10	-5.95	$133,769.73
New Democratic	German Gutierrez	9,423	14.66	-9.61	$35,678.98
Green	Carol Dyck	2,286	3.56	-0.48	$2,843.90
Marxist–Leninist	Marvin Roman	145	0.23	–	–
Total valid votes/Expense limit		64,271	100.00		$228,722.98
Total rejected ballots		267	0.41	–	
Turnout		64,538	72.66	–	
Eligible voters		88,819			
Liberal gain from Conservative		Swing		+11.08	
Source: Elections Canada
