= Susan Truppe =

Canadian politician

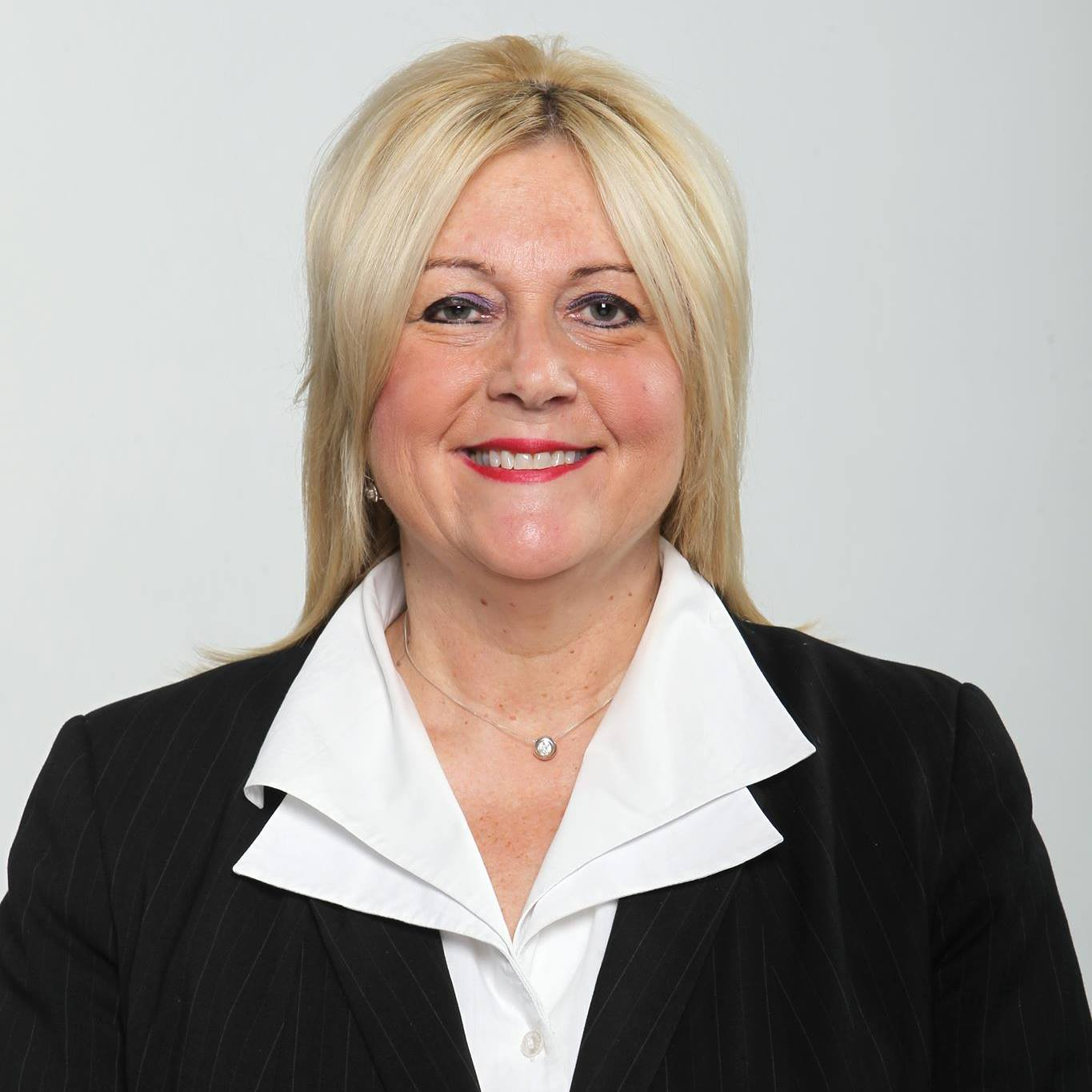

Member of Parliament for London North Centre
- In office May 30, 2011 – August 4, 2015
- Preceded by: Glen Pearson
- Succeeded by: Peter Fragiskatos

Personal details
- Born: August 20, 1959 (age 66) Windsor, Ontario
- Party: Conservative

Susan Truppe (born August 20, 1959) is a Canadian politician, who was elected to the House of Commons of Canada in the 2011 election. She represented the electoral district of London North Centre as a member of the Conservative Party.

During the 41st Canadian Parliament, Truppe served as parliamentary secretary to the Minister responsible for the Status of Women. She also served on the Standing Committee on the Status of Women and the Special Committee on Violence Against Indigenous Women.

In the 2015 Canadian federal election, Truppe ran unsuccessfully for re-election, coming second behind challenger Peter Fragiskatos of the Liberal Party of Canada.

On November 4, 2016, Truppe announced that she would seek the Progressive Conservative Party of Ontario (PC) nomination in London North Centre. On April 2, 2017, she won the nomination to become the PC candidate for the 42nd Ontario general election. In the election on June 7, 2018, she finished second to Terence Kernaghan of the Ontario New Democratic Party.

== Electoral history ==
2018 Ontario general election: London North Centre
Party	Candidate	Votes	%
New Democratic	Terence Kernaghan	25,757	47.60
Progressive Conservative	Susan Truppe	16,701	30.86
Liberal	Kate Graham	8,501	15.71
Green	Carol Dyck	2,493	4.61
Libertarian	Calvin McKay	299	0.55
Freedom	Paul McKeever	234	0.43
Communist	Clara Sorrenti	128	0.24
Total valid votes		54,113	100.0
Source: Elections Ontario

2015 Canadian federal election
Party	Candidate	Votes	%	±%	Expenditures
Liberal	Peter Fragiskatos	32,421	50.46	+16.22	–
Conservative	Susan Truppe	19,989	31.11	-5.94	–
New Democratic	German Gutierrez	9,422	14.66	-9.62	–
Green	Carol Dyck	2,274	3.54	-0.50	–
Marxist–Leninist	Marvin Roman	145	0.23	–	–
Total valid votes/Expense limit		64,251	100.0		$227,732.91
Total rejected ballots		–	–	–	
Turnout		–	–	–	
Eligible voters		87,668			
Source: Elections Canada

2011 Canadian federal election
Party	Candidate	Votes	%	±%	Expenditures
Conservative	Susan Truppe	19,468	36.96	+3.99	$88,641.34
Liberal	Glen Pearson	17,803	33.80	-5.33	$64,078.28
New Democratic	German Gutierrez	12,996	24.67	+7.20	$16,103.05
Green	Mary Ann Hodge	2,177	4.13	-6.30	$9,128.59
Animal Alliance	AnnaMaria Valastro	229	0.43	–	$71.19
Total valid votes		52,673	100.00	–	
Total rejected ballots		231	0.44	+0.03	$178,022.45
Turnout		52,904	59.69	–	
Eligible voters		88,624	–	–	
