= London Fire Department =

Emergency services department

- Logo
- Address: 400 Horton Street East; London, Ontario; N6B 1L7
- Coordinates: 42.98245380686118°N 81.23758535773848°W

Agency overview
- Established: 1873
- Employees: 416
- Annual budget: CA$66.69 million (2021)
- Fire chief: Lori Hamer
- Motto: Be Caring, Be Safe, Prevent Harm

Facilities and equipment
- Stations: 14
- Formerly: London Volunteer Fire Department

Website
- https://london.ca/living-london/community-services/fire-emergency-services/london-fire-department

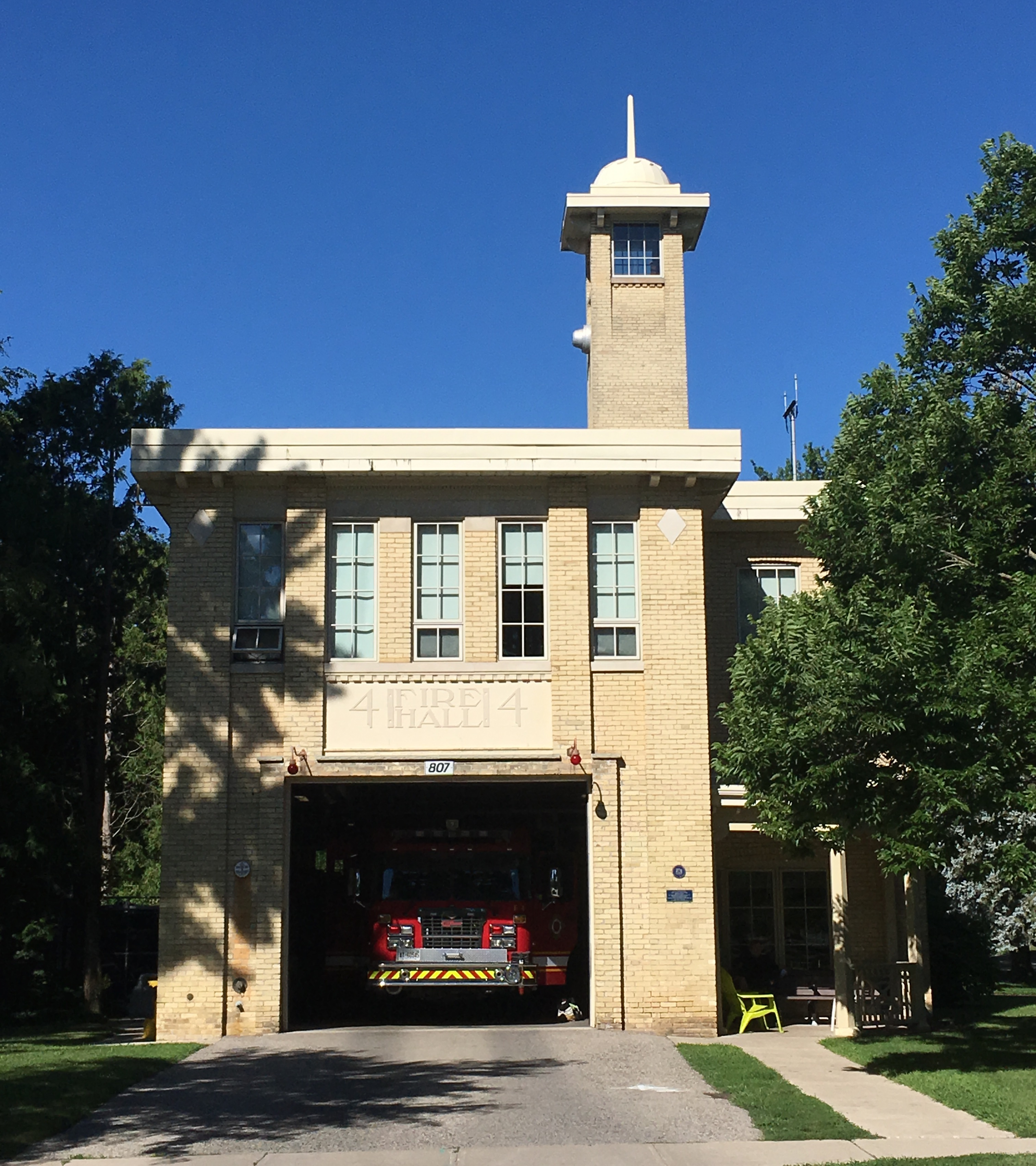
Built in 1909, Fire Hall no. 4 is a London cultural heritage site.

The London Fire Department (LFD) provides fire prevention, life preservation, and technical rescue services to the city of London, Ontario, Canada.

== History ==
A volunteer fire department was formed in 1842, two years following the incorporation of the village of London. The first fire station was erected on Carling Street in 1847.

The volunteer department was replaced by the permanent London Fire Department on April 1, 1873, following the Great Fire of London in 1845 which destroyed over 300 buildings. The department has since run 24 hours a day and seven days a week. Firefighters with the London Fire Department are all members of the London Professional Fire Firefighters Association, Local 142 of the IAFF.

== Operations ==
=== Apparatus ===
The London Fire Department has a diverse apparatus fleet laid out across the city's 14 fire stations. Various vehicles perform specialized tasks to fight fires, prevent injury, and preserve life.

Stations and Apparatus*
Station #	Serving	Engine Company	Rescue Company	Tanker Company	Truck Company	Haz-Mat Unit	Service Unit	Car Unit	Marine & Zodiac Units	Tech Support Unit	Service Unit	Fire Investigation Unit	Command Unit
1	Downtown and Citywide (Headquarters)	Engine 1		Truck 1		Haz-Mat 1		Car 1			Service 1	Fire Investigation Unit 1	Command 1
2	East London (Old East Village)	Engine 2 Engine 21 Engine 22 Engine 24 Engine 25	Rescue 2	Tanker 25	Truck 20				Marine & Zodiac 2				Command 2
3	Southwest London (Westmount)	Engine 3							Marine & Zodiac 3				
4	Central London (Bishop Hellmuth District)	Engine 4											
5	Southeast London (Pond Mills)	Engine 5		Tanker 5						Tech Support 1			
6	West London	Engine 6			Truck 6								Command 6
7	Northeast London (Huron Heights)	Engine 7			Truck 7								
8	North London (University/Masonville)	Engine 8					Service 8						
9	South London (White Oaks/Westminster)	Engine 9			Truck 9								Command 9
10	East London (Argyle)	Engine 10											
11	Lambeth	Engine 11		Tanker 11									
12	Southwest London (Byron)	Engine 12											
13	Northeast London (Northdale/Fanshawe)	Engine 13											
14	Northwest London (Fox Hollow/White Hills)	Engine 14											

^{*Spare vehicles are italicized.}

=== Teams ===
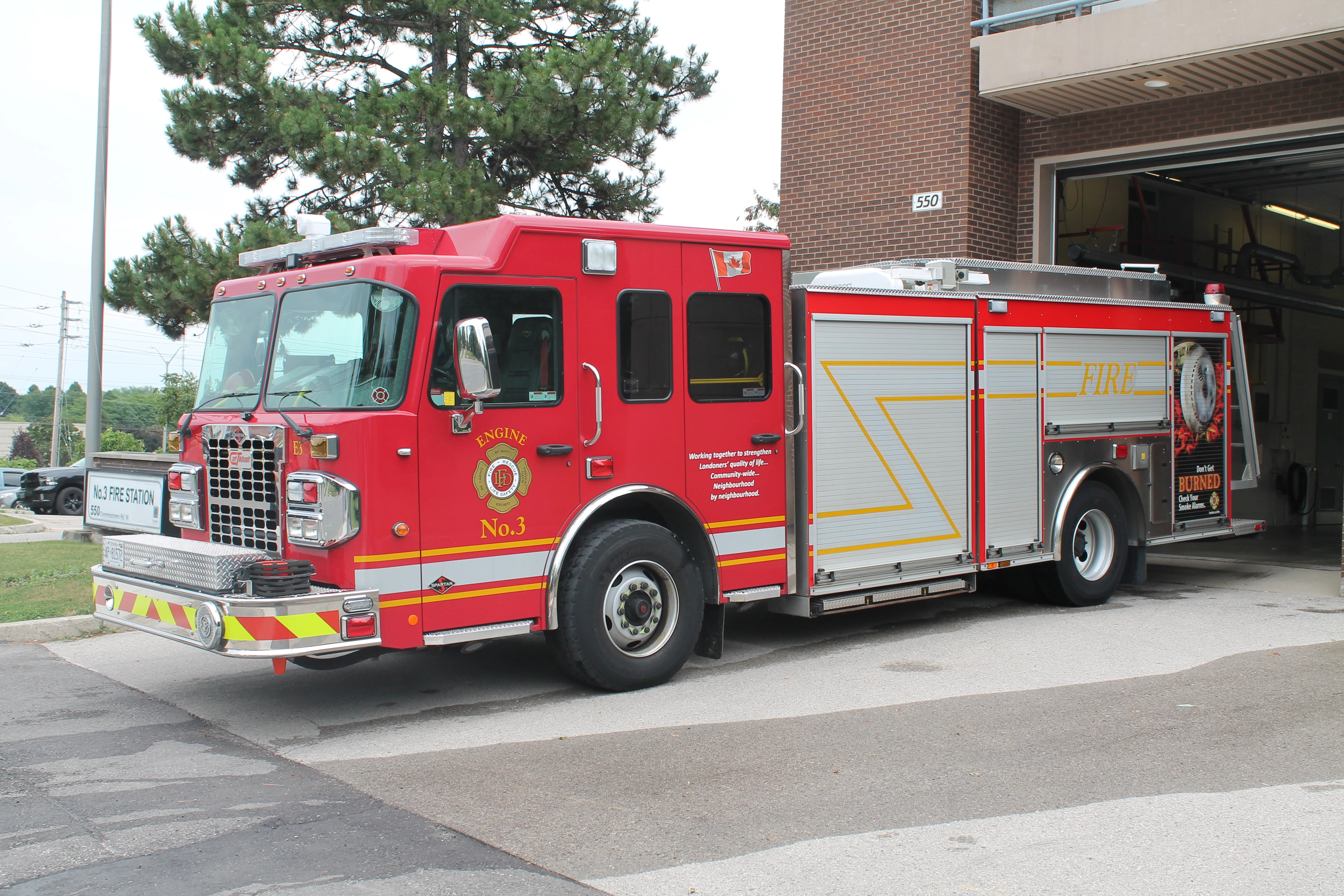
Engine no. 3, a 2016 Spartan Metro Star MFD/Carl Thibault.

In addition to standard firefighting and rescue services, some employees of LFD further divided into four specialized teams: ice/water rescue, hazardous materials, technical/rope rescue, and fire communications.

=== Budget ===
As per the 2020-2023 Multi-Year Budget, the London Fire Department's services and assets are paid for by the taxpayers of London at an approximate rate of 80 cents a day per citizen. In 2021, the department's yearly net budget was CA$66.7 million.

Included in the budget is funding for London's new Fire Station 15, built to serve the southeast part of the city (specifically the growing Summerside area). Station 15, which will cost approximately $3.85 million to build, is planned to open in 2025, and will include an engine.
