= Terence Kernaghan =

Canadian politician

Terence Kernaghan MPP
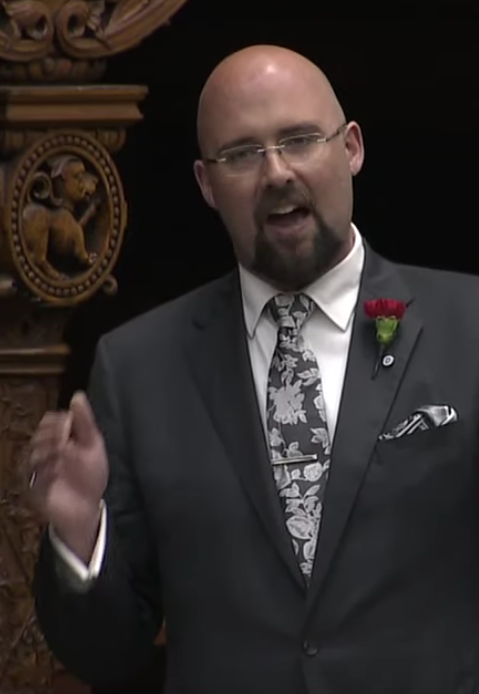

Critic, Economic Development, Job Creation, and Trade
- Incumbent
- Assumed office July 13, 2022
- Leader: Marit Stiles

Critic, LGBTQ Issues
- In office August 23, 2018 – June 2, 2022
- Leader: Andrea Horwath

Member of the Ontario Provincial Parliament for London North Centre
- Incumbent
- Assumed office June 7, 2018
- Preceded by: Deb Matthews

Personal details
- Party: New Democratic
- Occupation: Teacher, Librarian, Politician

Terence Devin Kernaghan is a Canadian politician, who was elected to the Legislative Assembly of Ontario in the 2018 provincial election. He represents the electoral district of London North Centre as a member of the Ontario New Democratic Party.

As of August 11, 2024, he serves as the Official Opposition critic for Economic Development, Job Creation and Trade.

== Personal life ==
Openly gay, Kernaghan worked as a teacher-librarian before entering politics. He studied at Western University Huron College, and Althouse College. He lives in London, where he is involved in various local organizations and boards.

== Election results ==
2025 Ontario general election: London North Centre
| Party | Candidate | Votes | % | ±% | Expenditures |
|---|---|---|---|---|---|
| New Democratic | Terence Kernaghan | 22,587 | 46.71 | +7.06 | $128,315 |
| Progressive Conservative | Jerry Pribil | 15,783 | 32.64 | +2.35 | $149,657 |
| Liberal | Tariq Khan | 7,557 | 15.63 | –5.29 | $49,794 |
| Green | Carol Dyck | 1,605 | 3.32 | –1.47 | $22,334 |
| New Blue | Chris Wile | 512 | 1.06 | –1.73 | $0 |
| Freedom | Paul McKeever | 312 | 0.65 | +0.27 | $0 |
| Total valid votes/expense limit | | 48,356 | 99.49 | – | $168,349 |
| Total rejected, unmarked and declined ballots | | 249 | 0.51 | +0.03 | |
| Turnout | | 48,605 | 46.48 | +4.35 | |
| Eligible voters | | 104,571 | | | |
| New Democratic hold | | Swing | | +4.70 | |
Source: Elections Ontario

2022 Ontario general election: London North Centre
| Party | Candidate | Votes | % | ±% | Expenditures |
|---|---|---|---|---|---|
| New Democratic | Terence Kernaghan | 17,082 | 39.65 | –7.95 | $128,057 |
| Progressive Conservative | Jerry Pribil | 13,051 | 30.29 | –0.57 | $114,458 |
| Liberal | Kate Graham | 9,013 | 20.92 | +5.21 | $119,854 |
| Green | Carol Dyck | 2,064 | 4.79 | +0.18 | $17,009 |
| New Blue | Tommy Caldwell | 1,200 | 2.79 | – | $7,309 |
| Ontario Party | Darrel Grant | 368 | 0.85 | – | $0 |
| Freedom | Paul McKeever | 160 | 0.37 | –0.06 | $0 |
| Consensus Ontario | George Le Mac | 147 | 0.34 | – | $0 |
| Total valid votes/expense limit | | 43,085 | 99.52 | – | $145,461 |
| Total rejected, unmarked and declined ballots | | 210 | 0.49 | –0.53 | |
| Turnout | | 43,295 | 42.13 | –12.82 | |
| Eligible voters | | 102,767 | | | |
| New Democratic hold | | Swing | | ▼3.69 | |
Source: Elections Ontario

2018 Ontario general election: London North Centre
| Party | Candidate | Votes | % | ±% |
|---|---|---|---|---|
| New Democratic | Terence Kernaghan | 25,757 | 47.60 | +17.16 |
| Progressive Conservative | Susan Truppe | 16,701 | 30.86 | +4.46 |
| Liberal | Kate Graham | 8,501 | 15.71 | –20.27 |
| Green | Carol Dyck | 2,493 | 4.61 | –0.76 |
| Libertarian | Calvin McKay | 299 | 0.55 | – |
| Freedom | Paul McKeever | 234 | 0.43 | –0.97 |
| Communist | Clara Sorrenti | 128 | 0.24 | –0.02 |
| Total valid votes | | 54,113 | 98.98 | |
| Total rejected, unmarked and declined ballots | | 555 | 1.02 | –0.45 |
| Turnout | | 54,668 | 54.95 | +4.73 |
| Eligible voters | | 99,488 | | |
| New Democratic gain from Liberal | | Swing | | +18.72 |
Source: Elections Ontario
