= Stein Eriksen Lodge Deer Valley =

Hotel and Lodge in Park City, Utah

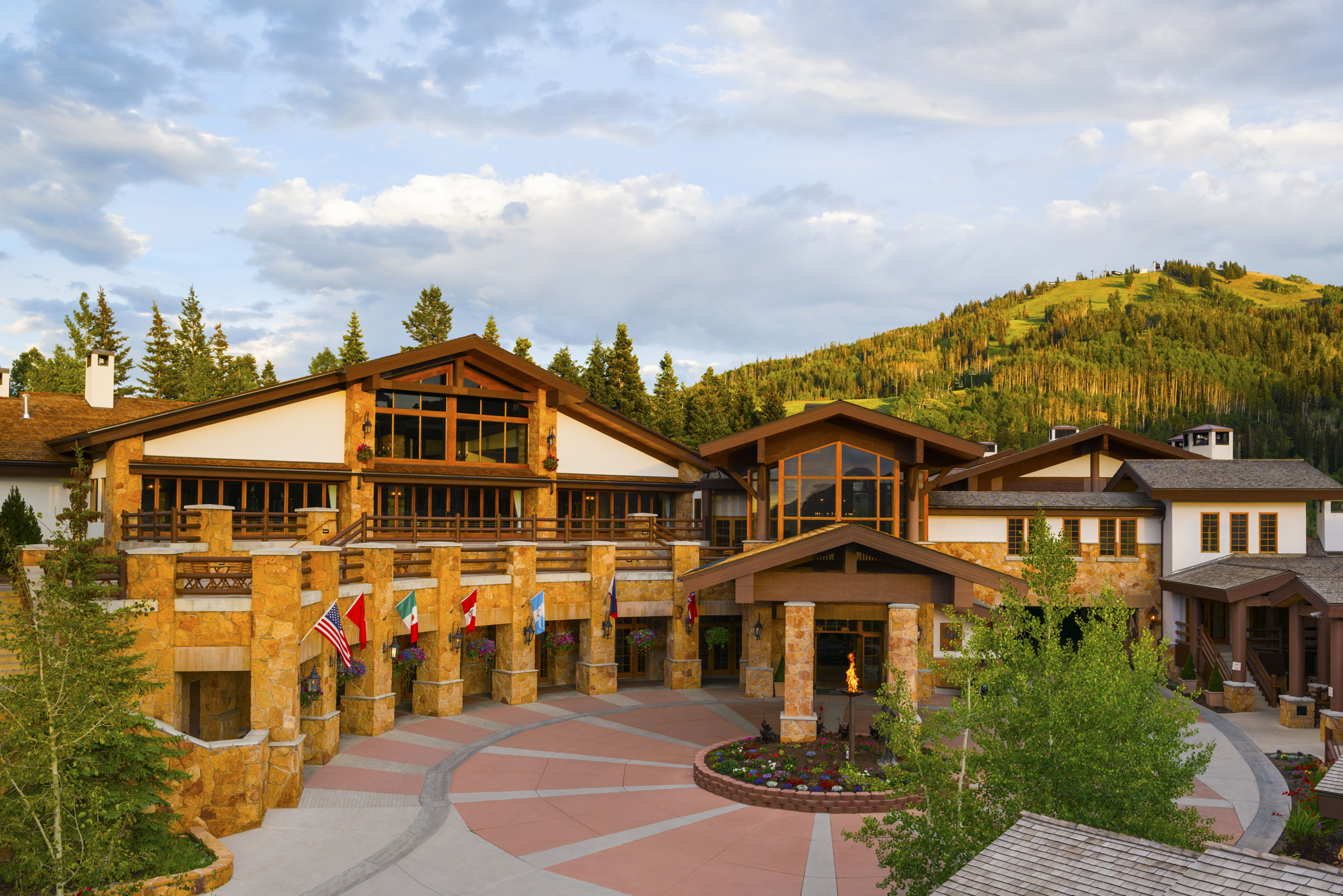
- Location: Park City, Utah
- Coordinates: 40°37′19″N 111°29′30″W
- Base elevation: 8,200 ft (2,500 m)
- Website: www.steinlodge.com

The Stein Eriksen Lodge Deer Valley is a resort located on Deer Valley Mountain in Park City, Utah, United States.

== History ==
Stein Eriksen Lodge is a ski lodge in Deer Valley, located in Park City, UT. Named after the skier Stein Eriksen, the Lodge opened at Deer Valley in December 1982 as one of the first luxury condominium hotels in the United States. The Lodge was developed by the Silver Lake Associates Organization. It is currently managed by the Stein Eriksen Lodge Management Corporation.

Stein Eriksen Lodge was built in phases, which consisted of individual units that were sold to private buyers with the option of renting to guests on a nightly basis. Phase I opened in December 1982 with 31 units, Phase II opened in December 1984 with an additional 23 units, and Phase III opened in May 2002 with an additional 11 units.
