= Keffals =

Canadian Twitch streamer (born 1994)

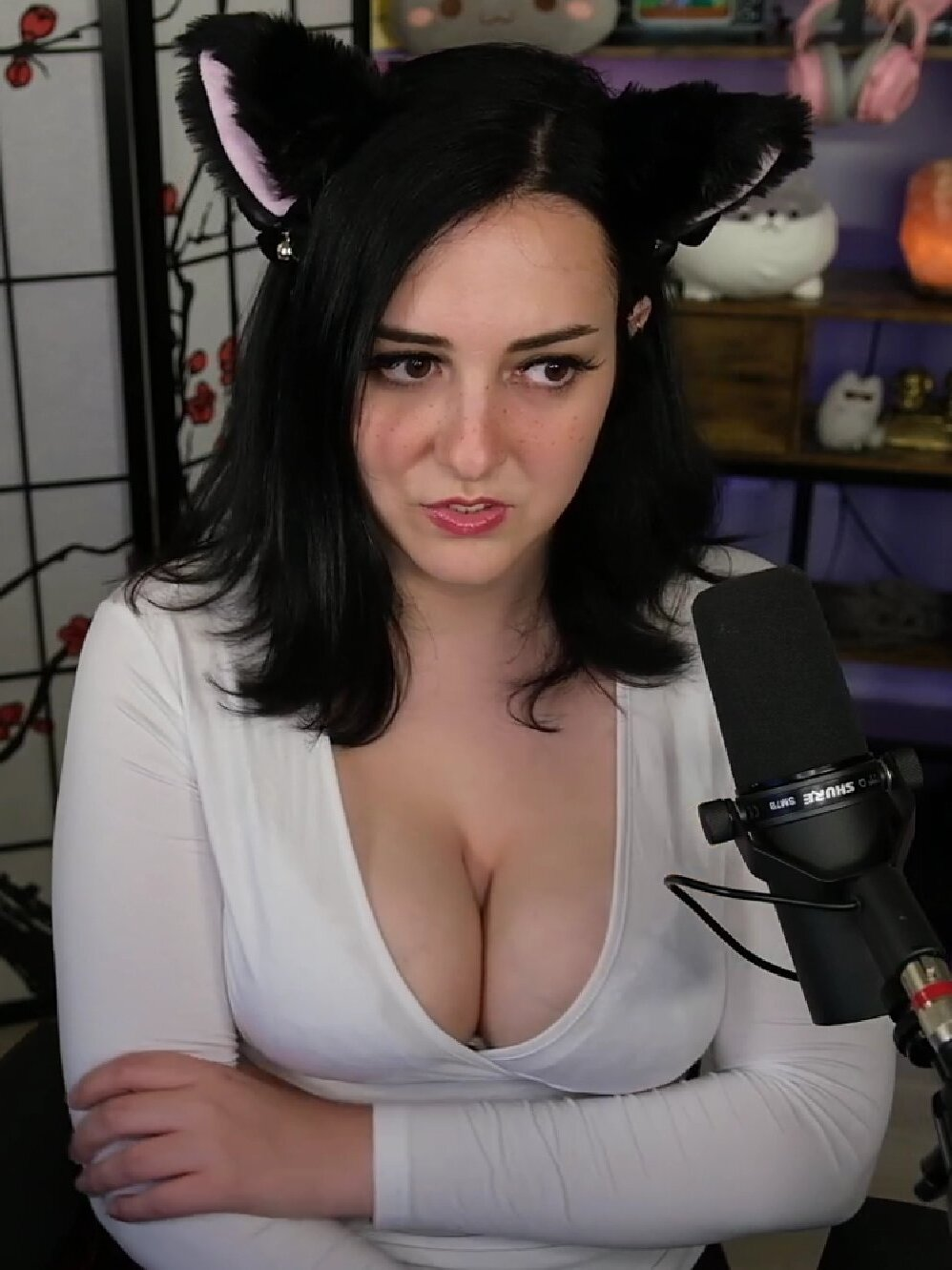
- Sorrenti in 2022
- Born: March 25, 1994 (age 32); Ontario, Canada

Twitch information
- Channel: keffals
- Years active: 2021–2024
- Followers: 43.2 thousand

YouTube information
- Channel: Keffals
- Subscribers: 46.5 thousand
- Views: 3.184 million
- Last updated: April 23, 2026
- Website: keffals.gg

Clara Sorrenti (born March 25, 1994), better known as Keffals, is a Canadian Twitch streamer, transgender activist, and left-wing political commentator. She began advocating transgender rights after Texas Governor Greg Abbott instructed Texas state agencies to treat gender-affirming medical treatments for transgender youths (such as puberty blockers or hormone treatments) as child abuse. She has commentated on her experiences as a trans woman and has hosted people such as Chelsea Manning on her stream.

Sorrenti was previously a member of the Communist Party of Canada and contested two elections under the party banner. She was also an organizer for the Young Communist League of Canada. She has since ended her affiliation with both groups.

In 2022, Sorrenti became the subject of a loosely organized harassment campaign that she has attributed to Kiwi Farms, with internet trolls using her deadname while filing false police reports, pizza bombing her residence, and organizing a number of swattings.

== Early life ==
When growing up, Sorrenti played video games such as Team Fortress 2 and Garry's Mod using the online handle "Keffals". By the age of 12, she realized that she was transgender. In 2013, when she was 18, she traveled to Thailand with her parents to receive gender-affirming surgery. She attended the University of Western Ontario.

== Political career and activism ==
Sorrenti is an advocate for the rights of transgender people. She has stated that she receives frequent harassment for being a trans person.

Early in her life Sorrenti volunteered with the New Democratic Party. She entered Canadian politics following the 2016 election of Donald Trump in the United States, running for two races in 2018 and 2019 as a member of the Communist Party of Canada. She ran in the 2018 Ontario general election and the 2019 Canadian federal election, but lost both races. During that time, she was the organizer for the Young Communist League's London, Ontario chapter.

== Internet career ==
Sorrenti began streaming on Twitch playing video games, but switched to politics after a wave of anti-trans legislation was introduced in state legislatures in 2021 and 2022. She spoke out against Texas Governor Greg Abbott when he instructed Texas state agencies to treat gender-affirming medical treatments, such as puberty blockers or hormone treatments, for transgender youths as child abuse. Speaking on an Alabama law making it a felony to provide gender-affirming care for those under 18, Sorrenti said, "They literally want these kids to fucking kill themselves." In April 2022, she raised US$205,000 for the Campaign for Southern Equality to protect transgender youth. A month later, she called attention to a VOD of a 16-year-old trans Twitch streamer who was taken into foster care after police conducted a wellness check. She has also criticized the Florida Parental Rights in Education Act and the false claim shared by online figures such as Infowars and United States Congressman Paul Gosar that the Uvalde shooter was transgender on stream. She was profiled by Taylor Lorenz in The Washington Post in June 2022. Lorenz described Sorrenti as "part of a new class of stars who have abandoned the platform's traditional game-stream format to talk about news and politics" and described her Twitch stream as "one of the few media outlets where viewers can hear the news from a trans person."

In July 2022 her Twitch account was suspended for 28 days (reduced to 14) for "repeated hateful slurs or symbols" that featured on her stream thumbnail. Sorrenti said that the slurs in question were images of past harassment directed against her and that she had been banned "for openly talking about the abuse [she receives]". She moved to YouTube to stream during the ban.

Sorrenti joined Twitter in December 2020, and amassed over 100,000 followers on the platform. Sorrenti is also known for "ratioing" Twitter personalities, and has been in online disputes with former Twitch streamer Destiny, as well other public figures, including Tim Pool, Candace Owens, Lauren Southern, and J. K. Rowling.

She supports her streaming career with fan donations from Patreon and PayPal, using the money to hire an editor and a graphic designer.

In a 2023 Progressive Victory livestream, Sorrenti and fellow streamers Destiny, Emma Vigeland, and Vaush interviewed U.S. Representative Ro Khanna about various topics, including the importance of youth political participation and ways to push progressive political sentiment.

In February 2023 Sorrenti announced on Twitter she would be taking a career break to enter rehab, stating that she had become addicted to narcotics in the preceding months.

In July 2024 Sorrenti announced she was retiring from streaming.

In March 2025, Sorrenti announced on Bluesky that she is returning to streaming, but will not be returning to social media.

== As a target of harassment ==
=== August 2022 swatting incident ===
On August 5, 2022, Sorrenti was swatted and arrested after an email was sent to members of the London, Ontario city council claiming to be Sorrenti with an intent to kill her mother and members of the London City Council. The incident, that she believes to be a hate crime, led to computers and phones being confiscated by police. She said the London Police Service had used her deadname during the arrest, as well as in the wellness check on her mother. Sorrenti claimed the police, talking to Sorrenti's mother, misgendered Sorrenti by referring to her as her mother's "son". According to the London police, any use of Sorrenti's former legal name was based on records of prior interactions with the police and not deliberate disrespect. CBC News reported that the chief of the police department said he would review how she was treated by officers. The swatting came after another earlier attempt had taken place through the Toronto Police Service; according to Sorrenti, the London Police Service was not aware of this previous attempt due to lack of correspondence with the Toronto Police Service. The London Police Service drafted reforms for its treatment of transgender suspects after the incident.

Following the incident, Sorrenti told Global News that "I'm not backing down. I know that the work I do is incredibly valuable, and ... I have [trans] people almost every day saying they came out to their families because of me". Jagmeet Singh, leader of the New Democratic Party, responded to the situation in a tweet saying "Trans folk, and especially trans activists, deserve the freedom to make themselves heard. Not to be doxed and swatted, arrested at gunpoint and deadnamed repeatedly. No one deserves this."

In December 2022, an internal investigation by the London Police Service into the August swatting incident found no evidence Sorrenti had been deadnamed audibly by officers, with the LPS stating they have the video and audio evidence to confirm this.

=== Conflict with Kiwi Farms ===
Following the swatting, Sorrenti also set up a GoFundMe fundraiser with the aim of funding a move and a lawsuit, and said that she aimed to continue to stream. Sorrenti later tweeted that the GoFundMe had its funds frozen after being mass reported. Nonetheless, she was subsequently able to move to a hotel. On August 17, 2022, the location of the hotel was posted online and the hotel was inundated with pizza deliveries made by trolls using Sorrenti's deadname. Sorrenti believes that the location of the hotel was discovered after she had posted a picture on her Discord server that inadvertently revealed the patterned bedsheets used by the hotel, allowing internet trolls to cross-reference the sheets with those in local hotels. Sorrenti blamed Kiwi Farms for the swatting attempts.

Following continued harassment, Sorrenti announced that she would be leaving Canada and moving to an undisclosed location in Europe. She was once again doxxed after relocating to Belfast, Northern Ireland. On September 3, 2022, pressure on Cloudflare in response to the harassment campaign resulted in the company terminating services to the Kiwi Farms website, as the firm considered the forum activity to be increasingly dangerous. The site was briefly accessible only through Tor. Sorrenti declared victory on September 5, saying the campaign had more than succeeded in its aim to shut Kiwi Farms down. On September 6, 2022, The Daily Dot confirmed that VanwaTech was providing content delivery network services to Kiwi Farms, hence bringing it back online.

== Electoral results ==
2018 Ontario general election: London North Centre
Party	Candidate	Votes	%	±%
New Democratic	Terence Kernaghan	25,757	47.60	+17.16
Progressive Conservative	Susan Truppe	16,701	30.86	+4.46
Liberal	Kate Graham	8,501	15.71	–20.27
Green	Carol Dyck	2,493	4.61	–0.76
Libertarian	Calvin McKay	299	0.55	–
Freedom	Paul McKeever	234	0.43	–0.97
Communist	Clara Sorrenti	128	0.24	–0.02
Total valid votes		54,113	98.98	
Total rejected, unmarked and declined ballots		555	1.02	–0.45
Turnout		54,668	54.95	+4.73
Eligible voters		99,488		
New Democratic gain from Liberal		Swing		+18.72
Source: Elections Ontario

2019 Canadian federal election: London North Centre
Party	Candidate	Votes	%	±%	Expenditures
Liberal	Peter Fragiskatos	27,427	42.75	−7.71	$107,501.27
Conservative	Sarah Bokhari	15,066	23.64	−7.47	none listed
New Democratic	Dirka Prout	14,887	23.36	+8.69	none listed
Green	Carol Dyck	4,872	7.64	+4.09	$12,325.20
People's	Salim Mansur	1,532	2.40	—	$61,391.07
Communist	Clara Sorrenti	137	0.21	—	none listed
Total valid votes/expense limit		63,741	99.23		
Total rejected ballots		493	0.77	+0.35	
Turnout		64,234	65.52	−3.91	
Eligible voters		98,039			
Liberal hold		Swing		−0.12	
Source: Elections Canada
