= Project Honey Pot =

Web-based honeypot network

- Headquarters: Park City, Utah
- Website: Official website

Project Honey Pot is a web-based honeypot network operated by Unspam Technologies, Inc. It uses software embedded in web sites. It collects information about the IP addresses used when harvesting e-mail addresses in spam, bulk mailing, and other e-mail fraud. The project solicits the donation of unused MX entries from domain owners.

In 2007, the Project began a number of new initiatives including a QuickLinks program that makes it easier for more people to participate, as well as a system to track comment spam. The Project has also launched a free new service called http:BL, which leverages the data to allow website administrators to keep malicious web robots off their sites.

In addition to collecting information, which is made available on a "top 25" list at periodic intervals, the project organizers also help various law enforcement agencies combat private and commercial unsolicited bulk mailing offenses and, overall, work to reduce the amount of spam being sent and received on the Internet. The information collected is also used in research and development of newer versions of the software to further improve the efforts of the group as a whole.
