= London Centre (federal electoral district) =

Federal electoral district in Ontario, Canada

Coordinates: 43.0°N 81.2°W

Ontario electoral district
- Interactive map of riding boundaries from the 2025 federal election

Federal electoral district
- Legislature: House of Commons
MP
Peter Fragiskatos
Liberal
- District created: 1996
- First contested: 1997
- Last contested: 2021
- District webpage: profile, map

Demographics
- Population (2011): 118,079
- Electors (2015): 87,668
- Area (km²): 63
- Pop. density (per km²): 1,874.3
- Census division: Middlesex
- Census subdivision: London (part)

London Centre (French: London-Centre; formerly known as London North Centre and London—Adelaide) is a federal electoral district in the city of London in the province of Ontario, Canada, that has been represented in the House of Commons of Canada since 1997.

Under the 2022 Canadian federal electoral redistribution, the riding largely replaced the former riding of London North Centre.

== Demographics ==
According to the 2021 Canadian census

Ethnic groups: 65.5% White, 8.3% South Asian, 4.6% Chinese, 3.7% Black, 3.7% Arab, 3.3% Indigenous, 2.8% Latin American, 1.7% Southeast Asian, 1.6% Korean, 1.6% Filipino, 1.5% West Asian
Languages: 68.7% English, 2.8% Mandarin, 2.6% Arabic, 2.3% Spanish, 1.3% Korean, 1.2% Malayalam, 1.1% French, 1.1% Portuguese
Religions: 46.2% Christian (19.5% Catholic, 4.6% United Church, 4.2% Anglican, 2.0% Christian Orthodox, 1.6% Presbyterian, 1.3% Baptist, 13.0% Other), 6.3% Muslim, 3.3% Hindu, 1.3% Buddhist, 39.6% None
Median income: $37,200 (2020)

Average income: $50,920 (2020)

== Geography ==
It consists of the part of the City of London east of Wonderland Road North and Wharncliffe Road, north of Oxford Street West and the Thames River and west of Highbury Avenue North. The district includes the University of Western Ontario and University and St. Joseph's Hospitals. Wonderland Road, Oxford Street, Wharncliffe Road, and south branch of the Thames River form its western boundary with the district of London West, Highbury Avenue and the south branch of the Thames its eastern and southern boundaries with London—Fanshawe, and the north city limit its boundary with Perth—Middlesex riding to the north.

== History ==
The riding was created in 1996 as "London—Adelaide" from parts of London East, London West and London—Middlesex ridings. It was renamed "London North Centre" in 1997.

This riding lost territory to London—Fanshawe and gained territory from London West during the 2012 electoral redistribution.

== Members of Parliament ==
This riding has elected the following members of the House of Commons:

Parliament	Years	Member	Party
London—Adelaide; Riding created from London East, London West and London—Middlesex
36th	1997–2000	Joe Fontana	Liberal
London North Centre
37th	2000–2004	Joe Fontana	Liberal
38th	2004–2006	Joe Fontana	Liberal
39th	2006–2006	Joe Fontana	Liberal
39th	2006–2008	Glen Pearson	Liberal
40th	2008–2011	Glen Pearson	Liberal
41st	2011–2015	Susan Truppe	Conservative
42nd	2015–2019	Peter Fragiskatos	Liberal
43rd	2019–2021	Peter Fragiskatos	Liberal
44th	2021–2025	Peter Fragiskatos	Liberal
London Centre
45th	2025–present	Peter Fragiskatos	Liberal

== Election results ==
Graph of election results in London North Centre (minor parties that never got 2% of the vote are omitted)

=== 2008–present ===
2025 Canadian federal election
Party	Candidate	Votes	%	±%	Expenditures
Liberal	Peter Fragiskatos	33,999	56.7	+18.97	
Conservative	Stephen Gallant	18,633	31.1	+6.49	
New Democratic	Dirka Prout	5,790	9.7	–20.71	
Green	Mary Ann Hodge	878	1.5	–0.49	
People's	David Annis	523	0.9	–4.27	
Canadian Future	Bruce Lamb	100	0.2	N/A	
Total valid votes/expense limit		59,923	99.5	+0.3	
Total rejected ballots		329	0.5	-0.3	
Turnout		60,252	67.8	+5.2	
Eligible voters		88,924			
Liberal hold		Swing		+6.24	
Source: CBC, Elections Canada

2021 Canadian federal election: London North Centre
Party	Candidate	Votes	%	±%	Expenditures
Liberal	Peter Fragiskatos	22,921	39.1	−3.7	$113,155.98
Conservative	Stephen Gallant	15,889	27.1	+3.5	$41,974.20
New Democratic	Dirka Prout	15,611	26.6	+3.2	$50,557.41
People's	Marc Emery	2,902	5.0	+2.6	$7,075.62
Green	Mary Ann Hodge	1,297	2.2	−5.4	$3,699.64
Total valid votes		58,620	99.2		
Total rejected ballots		460	0.8		
Turnout		59,080	62.2		
Eligible voters		94,977			
Liberal hold		Swing		−3.6	
Source: Elections Canada

2021 federal election redistributed results
Party	Vote	%
Liberal	20,854	37.55
New Democratic	16,874	30.38
Conservative	13,775	24.80
People's	2,861	5.15
Green	1,091	1.96
Others	83	0.15

2019 Canadian federal election: London North Centre
Party	Candidate	Votes	%	±%	Expenditures
Liberal	Peter Fragiskatos	27,427	42.75	−7.71	$107,501.27
Conservative	Sarah Bokhari	15,066	23.64	−7.47	none listed
New Democratic	Dirka Prout	14,887	23.36	+8.69	none listed
Green	Carol Dyck	4,872	7.64	+4.09	$12,325.20
People's	Salim Mansur	1,532	2.40	—	$61,391.07
Communist	Clara Sorrenti	137	0.21	—	none listed
Total valid votes/expense limit		63,741	99.23		
Total rejected ballots		493	0.77	+0.35	
Turnout		64,234	65.52	−3.91	
Eligible voters		98,039			
Liberal hold		Swing		−0.12	
Source: Elections Canada

2015 Canadian federal election
Party	Candidate	Votes	%	±%	Expenditures
Liberal	Peter Fragiskatos	32,427	50.45	+16.22	$139,844.01
Conservative	Susan Truppe	19,990	31.10	−5.95	$133,769.73
New Democratic	German Gutierrez	9,423	14.66	−9.61	$35,678.98
Green	Carol Dyck	2,286	3.56	−0.48	$2,843.90
Marxist–Leninist	Marvin Roman	145	0.23	–	–
Total valid votes/Expense limit		64,271	99.59		$228,722.98
Total rejected ballots		267	0.41	–	
Turnout		64,538	69.43	–	
Eligible voters		92,950			
Liberal gain from Conservative		Swing		+11.08	
Source: Elections Canada

2011 Canadian federal election
Party	Candidate	Votes	%	±%	Expenditures
Conservative	Susan Truppe	19,468	36.96	+3.99	$88,641.34
Liberal	Glen Pearson	17,803	33.80	−5.33	$64,078.28
New Democratic	German Gutierrez	12,996	24.67	+7.20	$16,103.05
Green	Mary Ann Hodge	2,177	4.13	−6.30	$9,128.59
Animal Alliance	AnnaMaria Valastro	229	0.43	–	$71.19
Total valid votes		52,673	100.00	–	
Total rejected ballots/Expense Limit		231	0.44	+0.03	$94,071.99
Turnout		52,904	59.69	–	
Eligible voters		88,624	–	–	

2008 Canadian federal election
Party	Candidate	Votes	%	±%	Expenditures
Liberal	Glen Pearson	21,018	39.13	+4.27	$90,524
Conservative	Paul Van Meerbergen	17,712	32.97	+8.49	$71,577
New Democratic	Steve Holmes	9,387	17.47	+3.39	$13,795
Green	Mary Ann Hodge	5,603	10.43	−15.41	$7,209
Total valid votes/Expense limit		53,720	100.00	$93,856	
Total rejected ballots		222	0.41		
Turnout		53,942			

=== 2006 by-election ===
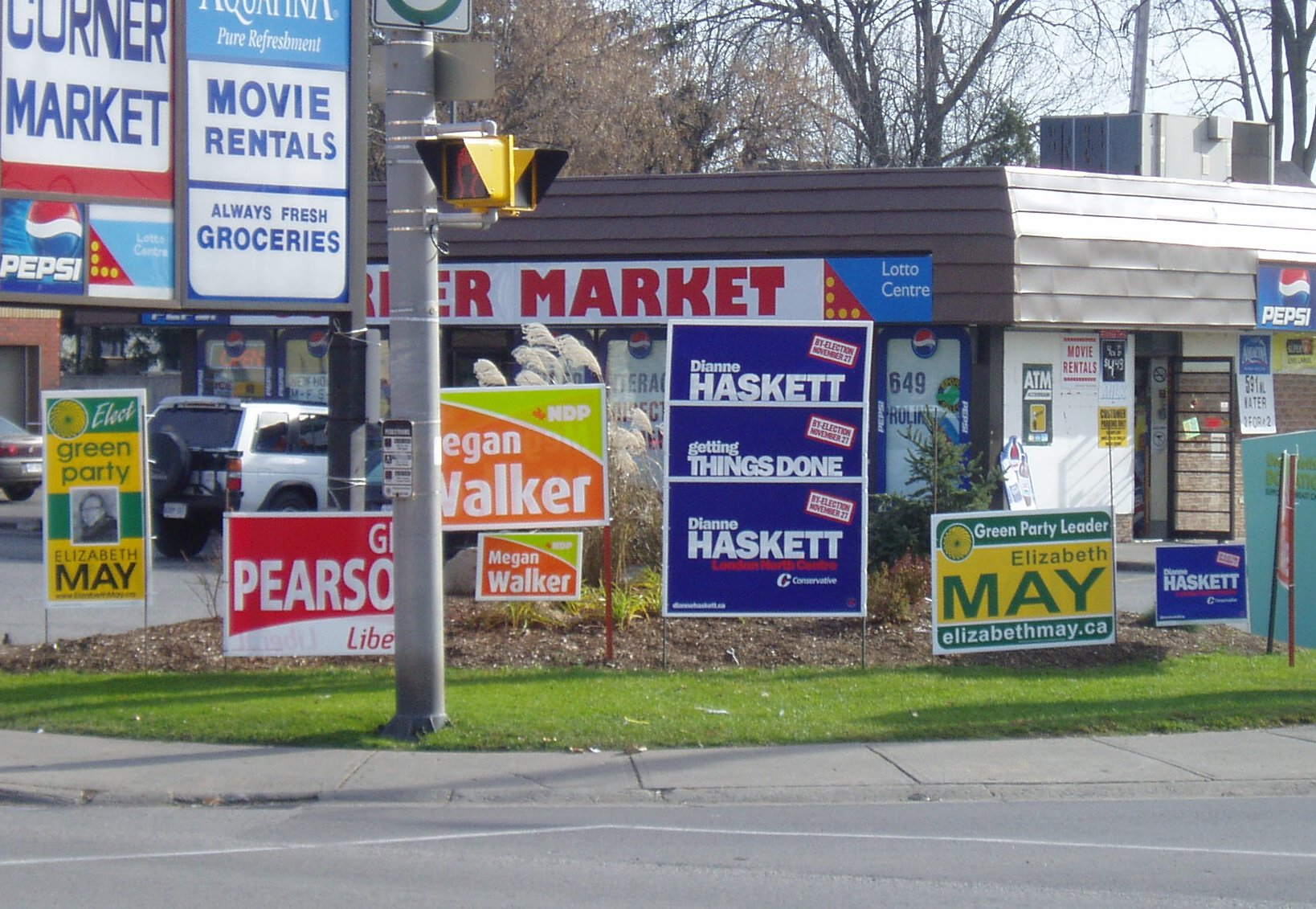
Lawn signs for all the major candidates decorate the intersection of Dundas and Egerton streets during the by-election

Long-time MP Joe Fontana resigned from the seat in 2006 in order to run in the London municipal election as a candidate for mayor, requiring a by-election to be held.

The election was called on October 22, 2006 with polling day falling on November 27.

The election result presented a major breakthrough for the Green Party, tripling its previous showing in the general election and placing slightly ahead of the candidate of the governing Conservative Party. The vote for party leader Elizabeth May was over five times the 4.5% national popular vote in the preceding federal election.

Canadian federal by-election, November 27, 2006: London North Centre Resignation of Joe Fontana
Party	Candidate	Votes	%	±%
Liberal	Glen Pearson	13,287	34.85	−5.27
Green	Elizabeth May	9,864	25.87	+20.38
Conservative	Dianne Haskett	9,309	24.42	−5.48
New Democratic	Megan Walker	5,388	14.13	−9.62
Progressive Canadian	Steven Hunter	145	0.38	−0.09
Independent	Robert Ede	77	0.20	–
Canadian Action	Will Arlow	53	0.14	–
Total		38,123	100.00	

=== 1997–2006 general elections ===
2006 Canadian federal election
Party	Candidate	Votes	%	±%	Expenditures
Liberal	Joe Fontana	24,109	40.12	−2.96	$78,406
Conservative	John Mazzilli	17,968	29.90	+2.46	$63,536
New Democratic	Stephen Maynard	14,271	23.75	−0.39	$20,817
Green	Stuart Smith	3,300	5.49	+0.72	$2,442
Progressive Canadian	Rod Morley	283	0.47	+0.03	$2,852
Marxist–Leninist	Margaret Mondaca	160	0.27	+0.14	$0.00

2004 Canadian federal election
Party	Candidate	Votes	%	±%
Liberal	Joe Fontana	21,472	43.08	−8.46
Conservative	Tim Gatten	13,677	27.44	−9.57
New Democratic	Joe Swan	12,034	24.14	+15.24
Green	Bronagh Joyce Morgan	2,376	4.77	+3.23
Progressive Canadian	Rod Morley	220	0.44	–
Marxist–Leninist	Gustavo Grandos-Ocon	67	0.13	–

^ Conservative change is from combined Canadian Alliance and Progressive Conservative totals.

2000 Canadian federal election
Party	Candidate	Votes	%	±%
Liberal	Joe Fontana	22,795	51.54	−0.18
Alliance	Nancy Branscombe	9,062	20.49	+5.30
Progressive Conservative	Lorie Johnson	7,305	16.52	−0.95
New Democratic	Colleen Redmond	3,936	8.90	−3.39
Green	Jeremy McNaughton	681	1.54	+0.06
Marijuana	Tim Berg	453	1.02	—

^ Canadian Alliance change is from Reform

1997 Canadian federal election
Party	Candidate	Votes	%	±%
Liberal	Joe Fontana	23,891	51.72	
Progressive Conservative	Jim Henkel	8,072	17.47	
Reform	Tara Bingham	7,016	15.19	
New Democratic	Colleen Redmond	5,679	12.29	
Green	Jeff Culbert	685	1.48	
Christian Heritage	Ken Devries	375	0.81	
Independent	Michael Rubinoff	336	0.73	
Marxist–Leninist	Vera Cruise	138	0.30	

== See also ==
- London North Centre (provincial electoral district)
- List of Canadian electoral districts
- Historical federal electoral districts of Canada
