= London North Centre (provincial electoral district) =

Provincial electoral district in Ontario, Canada

Coordinates: 43.1°N 81.3°W

Ontario electoral district
- Location in London

Provincial electoral district
- Legislature: Legislative Assembly of Ontario
MPP
Terence Kernaghan
New Democratic
- District created: 1996
- First contested: 1999
- Last contested: 2025

Demographics
- Population (2016): 125,360
- Electors (2018): 99,488
- Area (km²): 60
- Pop. density (per km²): 2,089.3
- Census division: Middlesex
- Census subdivision: London

London North Centre is a provincial electoral district in Ontario, Canada, that has been represented in the Legislative Assembly of Ontario since 1999. London North Centre was created from London North to match the federal riding in 1996.

Its population in 2006 was 115,250 and the average family income was $71,995.

== Demographics ==
According to the 2001 Canadian census

Population	107,672
Electors	91,328
Area (km^{2})	64
Population density (people per km^{2})	1682.4

Ethnic groups: 86.8% White, 2.0% Chinese, 1.9% Black, 1.8% South Asian, 1.7% Aboriginal, 1.2% Southeast Asian, 1.1% Arab
Languages: 79.8% English, 1.4% French, 18.0% Other

- Religions: 38.5% Protestant, 27.3% Catholic, 22.6% No religion, 3.0% Muslim, 2.8% other Christian, 2.2% Christian Orthodox, 1.1% Jewish

Average income: $31,174

== Geography ==
Elections Ontario's definition of London North Centre consists of that part of the City of London described as follows: commencing at the intersection of the northerly limit of said city with Highbury Avenue North; thence southerly along said avenue to the Canadian National Railway situated southerly of Brydges Street; thence westerly, southwesterly and southeasterly along said railway to the Thames River (South Branch); thence generally westerly along said river to the Canadian National Railway; thence westerly along said railway to the Thames River; thence generally southwesterly along said river to Wonderland Road South; thence generally northerly along said road and Wonderland Road North to the northerly limit of said city; thence northeasterly along said limit to the point of commencement.

== Members of Provincial Parliament ==
This riding has elected the following members of the Legislative Assembly of Ontario:

London North Centre
Assembly	Years	Member	Party
Riding created from London North, London Centre and Middlesex
37th	1999–2003	Dianne Cunningham	Progressive Conservative
38th	2003–2007	Deb Matthews	Liberal
39th	2007–2011	Deb Matthews	Liberal
40th	2011–2014	Deb Matthews	Liberal
41st	2014–2018	Deb Matthews	Liberal
42nd	2018–2022	Terence Kernaghan	New Democratic
43rd	2022–2025	Terence Kernaghan	New Democratic
44th	2025–present	Terence Kernaghan	New Democratic

== Election results ==
Winning party in each polling division of London North Centre at the 2025 Ontario general election

2025 Ontario general election
Party	Candidate	Votes	%	±%	Expenditures
New Democratic	Terence Kernaghan	22,587	46.71	+7.06	$128,315
Progressive Conservative	Jerry Pribil	15,783	32.64	+2.35	$149,657
Liberal	Tariq Khan	7,557	15.63	–5.29	$49,794
Green	Carol Dyck	1,605	3.32	–1.47	$22,334
New Blue	Chris Wile	512	1.06	–1.73	$0
Freedom	Paul McKeever	312	0.65	+0.27	$0
Total valid votes/expense limit		48,356	99.49	–	$168,349
Total rejected, unmarked and declined ballots		249	0.51	+0.03	
Turnout		48,605	46.48	+4.35	
Eligible voters		104,571			
New Democratic hold		Swing		+2.36	
Source: Elections Ontario

Winning party in each polling division of London North Centre at the 2022 Ontario general election

2022 Ontario general election
Party	Candidate	Votes	%	±%	Expenditures
New Democratic	Terence Kernaghan	17,082	39.65	–7.95	$128,057
Progressive Conservative	Jerry Pribil	13,051	30.29	–0.57	$114,458
Liberal	Kate Graham	9,013	20.92	+5.21	$119,854
Green	Carol Dyck	2,064	4.79	+0.18	$17,009
New Blue	Tommy Caldwell	1,200	2.79	–	$7,309
Ontario Party	Darrel Grant	368	0.85	–	$0
Freedom	Paul McKeever	160	0.37	–0.06	$0
Consensus Ontario	George Le Mac	147	0.34	–	$0
Total valid votes/expense limit		43,085	99.52	–	$145,461
Total rejected, unmarked and declined ballots		210	0.49	–0.53	
Turnout		43,295	42.13	–12.82	
Eligible voters		102,767			
New Democratic hold		Swing		–3.69	
Source: Elections Ontario

2018 Ontario general election
Party	Candidate	Votes	%	±%
New Democratic	Terence Kernaghan	25,757	47.60	+17.16
Progressive Conservative	Susan Truppe	16,701	30.86	+4.46
Liberal	Kate Graham	8,501	15.71	–20.27
Green	Carol Dyck	2,493	4.61	–0.76
Libertarian	Calvin McKay	299	0.55	–
Freedom	Paul McKeever	234	0.43	–0.97
Communist	Clara Sorrenti	128	0.24	–0.02
Total valid votes		54,113	98.98	
Total rejected, unmarked and declined ballots		555	1.02	–0.45
Turnout		54,668	54.95	+4.73
Eligible voters		99,488		
New Democratic gain from Liberal		Swing		+18.72
Source: Elections Ontario

2014 Ontario general election
Party	Candidate	Votes	%	±%
Liberal	Deb Matthews	16,379	35.98	–7.92
New Democratic	Judy Bryant	13,853	30.43	+7.72
Progressive Conservative	Nancy Branscombe	12,016	26.40	–2.53
Green	Kevin Labonte	2,445	5.37	+2.05
Freedom	Salim Mansur	639	1.40	+0.79
Communist	Dave McKee	115	0.25	–
Pauper	Michael Spottiswood	70	0.15	+0.03
Total valid votes		45,517	98.53	
Total rejected, unmarked and declined ballots		679	1.47	+0.98
Turnout		46,196	50.21	+2.34
Eligible voters		91,997		
Liberal hold		Swing		–7.82
Source: Elections Ontario

2011 Ontario general election
Party	Candidate	Votes	%	±%
Liberal	Deb Matthews	19,167	43.91	–3.26
Progressive Conservative	Nancy Branscombe	12,628	28.93	+5.21
New Democratic	Steve Holmes	9,914	22.71	+6.06
Green	Kevin Labonte	1,451	3.32	–9.13
Freedom	Mary Lou Ambrogio	269	0.62	–
Libertarian	Jordan Vanklinken	169	0.39	–
Pauper	Michael Spottiswood	54	0.12	–
Total valid votes		43,652	99.51	
Total rejected, unmarked and declined ballots		217	0.49	–0.52
Turnout		43,869	47.87	–2.13
Eligible voters		91,638		
Liberal hold		Swing		–4.24
Source: Elections Ontario

2007 Ontario general election
Party	Candidate	Votes	%	±%
Liberal	Deb Matthews	21,669	47.17	+3.74
Progressive Conservative	Rob Alder	10,897	23.72	–5.20
New Democratic	Steve Holmes	7,649	16.65	–7.87
Green	Brett McKenzie	5,720	12.45	+10.78
Total valid votes		45,935	98.99	
Total rejected, unmarked and declined ballots		469	1.01	+0.37
Turnout		46,404	50.00	–6.44
Eligible voters		92,813		
Liberal hold		Swing		+4.47
Source: Elections Ontario

2003 Ontario general election
Party	Candidate	Votes	%	±%
Liberal	Deb Matthews	20,212	43.43	+22.54
Progressive Conservative	Dianne Cunningham	13,460	28.92	–11.29
New Democratic	Rebecca Coulter	11,414	24.53	–11.94
Green	Bronagh Joyce Morgan	780	1.68	+0.87
Family Coalition	Craig Smith	432	0.93	–0.09
Freedom	Lisa Turner	242	0.52	+0.18
Total valid votes		46,540	99.36	
Total rejected, unmarked and declined ballots		299	0.64	–0.09
Turnout		46,839	56.44	+0.51
Eligible voters		82,991		
Liberal gain from Progressive Conservative		Swing		+17.24
Source: Elections Ontario

1999 Ontario general election
Party	Candidate	Votes	%
Progressive Conservative	Dianne Cunningham	18,320	40.21
New Democratic	Marion Boyd	16,611	36.46
Liberal	Roger Caranci	9,518	20.89
Family Coalition	Andrew J. Jezierski	466	1.02
Green	Jeff Culbert	366	0.80
Freedom	Robert Metz	156	0.34
Natural Law	Stephen R. Porter	120	0.26
Total valid votes		45,557	99.27
Total rejected, unmarked and declined ballots		334	0.73
Turnout		45,891	55.93
Eligible voters		82,057	
Progressive Conservative pickup new district.			
Source: Elections Ontario

== 2007 electoral reform referendum ==
2007 Ontario electoral reform referendum
Side	Votes	
First Past the Post	26,700	59.7
Mixed member proportional	18,003	40.3
Total valid votes	44,703	100.0

== See also ==
- List of Ontario provincial electoral districts
- Canadian provincial electoral districts
- London North Centre (federal electoral district)

== Sources ==
- Elections Ontario Past Election Results
