= Ontario (provincial electoral district) =

Ontario electoral district

Defunct provincial electoral district
- Legislature: Legislative Assembly of Ontario
- District created: 1867
- District abolished: 1975
- First contested: 1867
- Last contested: 1971

Demographics
- Census division: Ontario County
- Census subdivision(s): Ajax (until 1954), Oshawa (until 1954), Pickering (until 1967), Reach Township (from 1886), Scugog Township (from 1886). Whitby (until 1967)

Ontario was a provincial riding in the Canadian province of Ontario. Called Ontario South until 1933, it was active from 1867 to 1975. For its entire existence, the riding contained parts of or all of Ontario County, a now-defunct county which comprised most, but not all, of the contemporary Regional Municipality of Durham, including the municipalities of Ajax, Oshawa, Pickering and Whitby. After 1955, however, a separate riding called Oshawa was created to serve the city of Oshawa, Ajax and parts of Pickering and Whitby, while the Ontario riding continued to serve the more rural areas in the county. In 1966 a new Ontario South was created to represent Ajax, Pickering and Whitby. The remainder of the riding was divided into the new ridings of Durham West, Durham East and Durham—York in 1975.

== Members of the Legislative Assembly ==
Assembly	Years	Member	Party
Ontario South
1st	1867–1871	William McGill	Liberal
2nd	1871–1875	Abram Farewell	Liberal
3rd	1875–1879	Nicholas W. Brown	Conservative
4th	1879–1883	John Dryden	Liberal
5th	1883–1886	John Dryden	Liberal
6th	1886–1890	John Dryden	Liberal
7th	1890–1894	John Dryden	Liberal
8th	1894–1898	John Dryden	Liberal
9th	1898–1898	Charles Calder	Conservative
9th	1898–1902	John Dryden	Liberal
10th	1902–1905	John Dryden	Liberal
11th	1905–1908	Charles Calder	Conservative
12th	1908–1911	Charles Calder	Conservative
13th	1911–1914	W. E. N. Sinclair	Liberal
14th	1914–1919	Charles Calder	Conservative
15th	1919–1923	W. E. N. Sinclair	Liberal
16th	1923–1926	W. E. N. Sinclair	Liberal
17th	1926–1929	W. E. N. Sinclair	Liberal
18th	1929–1934	W. E. N. Sinclair	Liberal
Ontario
19th	1934–1937	W. E. N. Sinclair	Liberal
20th	1937–1943	Gordon Daniel Conant	Liberal
21st	1943–1945	Arthur Henry Williams	Co-operative Commonwealth
22nd	1945–1948	Thomas Kelso Creighton	Progressive Conservative
23rd	1948–1951	T.D. Thomas	Co-operative Commonwealth
24th	1951–1955	T.D. Thomas	Co-operative Commonwealth
25th	1955–1959	Matthew Dymond	Progressive Conservative
26th	1959–1963	Matthew Dymond	Progressive Conservative
27th	1963–1967	Matthew Dymond	Progressive Conservative
28th	1967–1971	Matthew Dymond	Progressive Conservative
29th	1971–1975	Matthew Dymond	Progressive Conservative
Merged into Durham West, Durham East and Durham North after 1975

== Election results (1934-1971) ==
1971 Ontario general election
Party	Candidate	Votes	%	±%
Progressive Conservative	Matthew Dymond	10,970	52.26	–2.89
Liberal	Robert Timbers	5,664	26.98	+0.69
New Democratic	Harold King	4,356	20.75	+2.20
Total valid votes		20,990	99.38	
Total rejected ballots		132	0.62	–0.02
Turnout		21,122	76.40	+11.26
Eligible voters		27,648		
Progressive Conservative hold		Swing		–1.79
Source: Elections Ontario

1967 Ontario general election
Party	Candidate	Votes	%	±%
Progressive Conservative	Matthew Dymond	7,513	55.15	–5.14
Liberal	J. Howard Anderson	3,582	26.29	+0.13
New Democratic	Allan Gordon McPhail	2,528	18.56	+5.02
Total valid votes		13,623	99.36	
Total rejected ballots		88	0.64	–0.28
Turnout		13,711	65.14	+2.96
Eligible voters		21,049		
Progressive Conservative hold		Swing		–2.63
Source: Elections Ontario

1963 Ontario general election
Party	Candidate	Votes	%	±%
Progressive Conservative	Matthew Dymond	9,903	60.29	+0.63
Liberal	Samuel Hollingsworth	4,298	26.17	–1.59
New Democratic	Tom Edwards	2,224	13.54	+0.97
Total valid votes		16,425	99.08	
Total rejected ballots		152	0.92	–0.07
Turnout		16,577	62.17	–0.52
Eligible voters		26,662		
Progressive Conservative hold		Swing		+1.11
Source: Elections Ontario

1959 Ontario general election
Party	Candidate	Votes	%	±%
Progressive Conservative	Matthew Dymond	9,018	59.67	+9.70
Liberal	Thomas Harris	4,196	27.76	–9.23
Co-operative Commonwealth	Tom Edwards	1,900	12.57	–0.47
Total valid votes		15,114	99.02	
Total rejected ballots		150	0.98	+0.26
Turnout		15,264	62.69	–6.35
Eligible voters		24,347		
Progressive Conservative hold		Swing		+9.47
Source: Elections Ontario

1955 Ontario general election
Party	Candidate	Votes	%	±%
Progressive Conservative	Matthew Dymond	7,248	49.97	+17.05
Liberal	Thomas Harris	5,366	36.99	+10.98
Co-operative Commonwealth	Roy Scott	1,892	13.04	–27.13
Total valid votes		14,506	99.28	
Total rejected ballots		105	0.72	–0.35
Turnout		14,611	69.05	–2.32
Eligible voters		21,161		
Progressive Conservative gain from Co-operative Commonwealth		Swing		+22.09
Source: Elections Ontario

1951 Ontario general election
Party	Candidate	Votes	%	±%
Co-operative Commonwealth	Tommy Thomas	12,054	40.17	–2.06
Progressive Conservative	Michael Starr	9,876	32.92	+0.49
Liberal	Walter Thomson	7,806	26.02	+0.67
Independent	Evelyn M. Bateman	268	0.89	–
Total valid votes		30,004	98.93	
Total rejected ballots		324	1.07	–0.58
Turnout		30,328	71.36	–1.88
Eligible voters		42,498		
Co-operative Commonwealth hold		Swing		–1.27
Source: Elections Ontario

1948 Ontario general election
Party	Candidate	Votes	%	±%
Co-operative Commonwealth	Tommy Thomas	11,758	42.23	+12.33
Progressive Conservative	Thomas Kelso Creighton	9,027	32.42	–3.07
Liberal	Wilfred Elmo Dunn	7,058	25.35	–5.95
Total valid votes		27,843	98.35	
Total rejected ballots		467	1.65	+0.49
Turnout		28,310	73.25	–0.67
Eligible voters		38,650		
Co-operative Commonwealth gain from Progressive Conservative		Swing		+9.14
Source: Elections Ontario

1945 Ontario general election
Party	Candidate	Votes	%	±%
Progressive Conservative	Thomas Kelso Creighton	9,130	35.49	+7.65
Liberal	Wilford H. Gifford	8,051	31.30	+3.20
Co-operative Commonwealth	Arthur Henry Williams	7,693	29.90	–14.16
Labour	William R. Cambers	852	3.31	–
Total valid votes		25,726	98.84	
Total rejected ballots		301	1.16	+0.50
Turnout		26,027	73.92	+9.68
Eligible voters		35,212		
Progressive Conservative gain from Co-operative Commonwealth		Swing		+10.91
Source: Elections Ontario

1943 Ontario general election
Party	Candidate	Votes	%	±%
Co-operative Commonwealth	Arthur Henry Williams	8,745	44.07	+23.43
Liberal	Jacob Carroll Anderson	5,575	28.09	–16.03
Progressive Conservative	George Hart	5,525	27.84	–7.05
Total valid votes		19,845	99.34	
Total rejected ballots		131	0.66	–0.21
Turnout		19,976	64.24	–13.49
Eligible voters		31,096		
Co-operative Commonwealth gain from Liberal		Swing		+15.24
Source: Elections Ontario

1937 Ontario general election
Party	Candidate	Votes	%	±%
Liberal	Gordon Daniel Conant	9,834	44.13	–12.50
Conservative	Grant L. Bird	7,775	34.89	+3.30
Co-operative Commonwealth	Finley M. Dafoe	4,598	20.63	+8.84
Socialist Labor	E. G. Forest	79	0.35	–
Total valid votes		22,286	99.14	
Total rejected ballots		194	0.86	–0.02
Turnout		22,480	77.73	+1.31
Eligible voters		28,920		
Liberal hold		Swing		–7.90
Source: Elections Ontario

1934 Ontario general election
Party	Candidate	Votes	%
Liberal	W. E. N. Sinclair	11,409	56.63
Conservative	Ernest L. Marks	6,363	31.58
Co-operative Commonwealth	Andrew Glen	2,375	11.79
Total valid votes		20,147	99.11
Total rejected ballots		180	0.89
Turnout		20,327	76.42
Eligible voters		26,599	
Liberal pickup new district.			
Source: Elections Ontario
