= Ontario South (provincial electoral district) =

Ontario electoral district

Defunct provincial electoral district
- Legislature: Legislative Assembly of Ontario
- District created: 1867
- District abolished: 1933
- District re-created: 1967
- District re-abolished: 1975
- First contested: 1867
- Last contested: 1971

Ontario South was a provincial electoral riding in Ontario, Canada. Created in 1867 at the time of Confederation, it was abolished in 1933 before the 1934 election. It was briefly recreated in 1967 and abolished again in 1975. It was last contested in 1971.

== Members of the Provincial Parliament ==
Ontario South
Assembly	Years	Member	Party
1st	1867–1871	William McGill	Liberal
2nd	1871–1874	Abram Farewell	Liberal
3rd	1875–1879	Nicholas W. Brown	Conservative
4th	1879–1883	John Dryden	Liberal
5th	1883–1886	John Dryden	Liberal
6th	1886–1890	John Dryden	Liberal
7th	1890–1894	John Dryden	Liberal
8th	1894–1898	John Dryden	Liberal
9th	1898–1898	Charles Calder	Conservative
9th	1898–1902	John Dryden	Liberal
10th	1902–1904	John Dryden	Liberal
11th	1905–1908	Charles Calder	Conservative
12th	1908–1911	Charles Calder	Conservative
13th	1911–1914	W. E. N. Sinclair	Liberal
14th	1914–1919	Charles Calder	Conservative
15th	1919–1923	W. E. N. Sinclair	Liberal
16th	1923–1926	W. E. N. Sinclair	Liberal
17th	1926–1929	W. E. N. Sinclair	Liberal
18th	1929–1934	W. E. N. Sinclair	Liberal
Merged into Ontario before the 1934 election
Re-established from the southern part of Ontario before the 1967 election
28th	1967–1971	Bill Newman	Progressive Conservative
29th	1971–1975	Bill Newman	Progressive Conservative
Sourced from the Ontario Legislative Assembly
Merged into Durham—York before the 1975 election

== Election results ==
=== 1967–1975 ===
1971 Ontario general election
Party	Candidate	Votes	%	±%
Progressive Conservative	Bill Newman	16,561	51.14	+11.57
New Democratic	Robert L. Wing	10,947	33.80	–0.19
Liberal	Mike Freeman	4,876	15.06	–10.67
Total valid votes		32,384	99.65	
Total rejected ballots		114	0.35	–0.12
Turnout		32,498	78.42	+6.68
Eligible voters		41,440		
Progressive Conservative hold		Swing		+5.88
Source: Elections Ontario

1967 Ontario general election
Party	Candidate	Votes	%
Progressive Conservative	Bill Newman	9,190	39.57
New Democratic	Tom Edwards	7,894	33.99
Liberal	Alban Ward	5,975	25.73
Social Credit	James Mackie	166	0.71
Total valid votes		23,225	99.52
Total rejected ballots		111	0.48
Turnout		23,336	71.74
Eligible voters		32,528	
Progressive Conservative pickup new district.			
Source: Elections Ontario

=== 1867–1934 ===
1929 Ontario general election
Party	Candidate	Votes	%	±%
Liberal	W. E. N. Sinclair	9,791	53.80	–3.50
Conservative	Frank L. Mason	8,408	46.20	+3.50
Total valid votes		18,199	99.07	
Total rejected ballots		170	0.93	+0.25
Turnout		18,369	65.35	–7.38
Eligible voters		28,109		
Liberal hold		Swing		–3.50
Source: Elections Ontario

1926 Ontario general election
Party	Candidate	Votes	%	±%
Liberal	W. E. N. Sinclair	8,901	57.30	+17.58
Conservative	John Stacey	6,633	42.70	+4.83
Total valid votes		15,534	99.32	
Total rejected ballots		106	0.68	–0.11
Turnout		15,640	72.73	+14.38
Eligible voters		21,504		
Liberal hold		Swing		+6.37
Source: Elections Ontario

1923 Ontario general election
Party	Candidate	Votes	%	±%
Liberal	W. E. N. Sinclair	4,212	39.72	–24.24
Conservative	James Moore	4,015	37.87	+1.83
United Farmers	Frederick H. Richardson	2,376	22.41	–
Total valid votes		10,603	99.21	
Total rejected ballots		84	0.79	–0.80
Turnout		10,687	58.35	–15.76
Eligible voters		18,316		
Liberal hold		Swing		–13.04
Source: Elections Ontario

1919 Ontario general election
Party	Candidate	Votes	%	±%
Liberal	W. E. N. Sinclair	7,843	63.97	+14.44
Conservative	Charles Calder	4,418	36.03	–14.44
Total valid votes		12,261	98.41	
Total rejected ballots		198	1.59	+0.78
Turnout		12,459	74.11	–8.93
Eligible voters		16,811		
Liberal gain from Conservative		Swing		+14.44
Source: Elections Ontario

1914 Ontario general election
Party	Candidate	Votes	%	±%
Conservative	Charles Calder	2,772	50.47	+2.99
Liberal	W. E. N. Sinclair	2,720	49.53	–2.99
Total valid votes		5,492	99.19	
Total rejected ballots		45	0.81	+0.39
Turnout		5,537	83.04	+9.54
Eligible voters		6,668		
Conservative gain from Liberal		Swing		+2.99
Source: Elections Ontario

1911 Ontario general election
Party	Candidate	Votes	%	±%
Liberal	W. E. N. Sinclair	2,577	52.52	+5.42
Conservative	Charles Calder	2,330	47.48	–5.42
Total valid votes		4,907	99.57	
Total rejected ballots		21	0.43	–0.24
Turnout		4,928	73.50	–11.96
Eligible voters		6,705		
Liberal gain from Conservative		Swing		+5.42
Source: Elections Ontario

1908 Ontario general election
Party	Candidate	Votes	%	±%
Conservative	Charles Calder	2,773	52.90	+1.85
Liberal	James Carnegie	2,469	47.10	–1.85
Total valid votes		5,242	99.34	
Total rejected ballots		35	0.66	+0.21
Turnout		5,277	85.46	–2.02
Eligible voters		6,175		
Conservative hold		Swing		+1.85
Source: Elections Ontario

1905 Ontario general election
Party	Candidate	Votes	%	±%
Conservative	Charles Calder	2,720	51.05	+2.34
Liberal	John Dryden	2,608	48.95	–2.34
Total valid votes		5,328	99.55	
Total rejected ballots		24	0.45	+0.37
Turnout		5,352	87.48	+4.49
Eligible voters		6,118		
Conservative gain from Liberal		Swing		+2.34
Source: Elections Ontario

1902 Ontario general election
Party	Candidate	Votes	%	±%
Liberal	John Dryden	2,632	51.29	–1.68
Conservative	Charles Calder	2,500	48.71	+1.68
Total valid votes		5,132	99.92	
Total rejected ballots		4	0.08	+0.08
Turnout		5,136	82.99	–
Eligible voters		6,189		
Liberal hold		Swing		–1.68
Source: Elections Ontario

Ontario provincial by-election, December 12, 1899 Void Election
Party	Candidate	Votes	%	±%
Liberal	John Dryden	2,872	52.97	+1.47
Conservative	Charles Calder	2,550	47.03	–1.47
Total valid votes		5,422	100.00	
Total rejected ballots		–		
Turnout		5,422	–	–
Eligible voters				
Liberal hold		Swing		+1.47
Source: Elections Ontario

Ontario provincial by-election, November 1, 1898 Void Election
Party	Candidate	Votes	%	±%
Liberal	John Dryden	2,682	51.50	+2.38
Conservative	Charles Calder	2,526	48.50	–2.38
Total valid votes		5,208	100.00	
Total rejected ballots		–		
Turnout		5,208	–	–
Eligible voters				
Liberal gain from Conservative		Swing		+2.38
Source: Elections Ontario

1898 Ontario general election
Party	Candidate	Votes	%	±%
Conservative	Charles Calder	2,781	50.88	+3.82
Liberal	John Dryden	2,685	49.12	–3.82
Total valid votes		5,466	99.64	
Total rejected ballots		20	0.36	–0.24
Turnout		5,486	97.89	+15.45
Eligible voters		5,604		
Conservative gain from Liberal		Swing		+3.82
Source: Elections Ontario

1894 Ontario general election
Party	Candidate	Votes	%	±%
Liberal	John Dryden	2,884	52.94	–
Conservative	R. Miller	2,564	47.06	–
Total valid votes		5,448	99.40	
Total rejected ballots		33	0.60	–
Turnout		5,481	82.45	–
Eligible voters		6,648		
Liberal hold		Swing		–
Source: Elections Ontario

Ontario provincial by-election, September 30, 1890 Ministerial By-election, appointment as Commissioner of Agriculture
Party	Candidate	Votes
Liberal	John Dryden	acclaimed
Source: Elections Ontario

1890 Ontario general election
Party	Candidate	Votes	%	±%
Liberal	John Dryden	2,460	51.38	–0.92
Conservative	R. Miller	2,328	48.62	+0.92
Total valid votes		4,788	99.46	
Total rejected ballots		26	0.54	–0.05
Turnout		4,814	73.43	+4.12
Eligible voters		6,556		
Liberal hold		Swing		–0.92
Source: Elections Ontario

1886 Ontario general election
Party	Candidate	Votes	%	±%
Liberal	John Dryden	2,651	52.30	–0.76
Conservative	John S. Larke	2,418	47.70	+0.76
Total valid votes		5,069	99.41	
Total rejected ballots		30	0.59	+0.07
Turnout		5,099	69.31	+3.14
Eligible voters		7,357		
Liberal hold		Swing		–0.76
Source: Elections Ontario

1883 Ontario general election
Party	Candidate	Votes	%	±%
Liberal	John Dryden	1,743	53.06	–3.18
Conservative	R. Miller	1,542	46.94	+3.18
Total valid votes		3,285	99.49	
Total rejected ballots		17	0.51	+0.51
Turnout		3,302	66.17	+5.58
Eligible voters		4,990		
Liberal hold		Swing		–3.18
Source: Elections Ontario

1879 Ontario general election
Party	Candidate	Votes	%	±%
Liberal	John Dryden	1,721	56.24	+6.76
Conservative	Nicholas W. Brown	1,339	43.76	−6.76
Total valid votes		3,060	60.59	−12.32
Eligible voters		5,050		
Liberal gain from Conservative		Swing		+6.76
Source: Elections Ontario

1875 Ontario general election
Party	Candidate	Votes	%	±%
Conservative	Nicholas W. Brown	1,614	50.52	+2.68
Liberal	Abram Farewell	1,581	49.48	−2.68
Total valid votes		3,195	72.91	+7.10
Eligible voters		4,382		
Conservative gain from Liberal		Swing		+2.68
Source: Elections Ontario

1871 Ontario general election
Party	Candidate	Votes	%	±%
Liberal	Abram Farewell	1,180	52.17	−4.18
Conservative	William McGill	1,082	47.83	+4.18
Turnout		2,262	65.81	−17.79
Eligible voters		3,437		
Liberal hold		Swing		−4.18
Source: Elections Ontario

1867 Ontario general election
Party	Candidate	Votes	%
Liberal	William McGill	1,367	56.35
Conservative	D. Tucker	1,059	43.65
Total valid votes		2,426	83.60
Eligible voters		2,902	
Liberal pickup new district.			
Source: Elections Ontario
