= John Dryden (Ontario politician) =

Canadian politician (1840–1909)

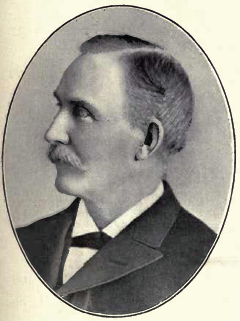

Ontario MPP
- In office 1898–1904
- Preceded by: Charles Calder
- Succeeded by: Charles Calder
- In office 1879–1898
- Preceded by: Nicholas W. Brown
- Succeeded by: Charles Calder
- Constituency: Ontario South

Personal details
- Born: June 5, 1840 Whitby Township, Upper Canada
- Died: July 29, 1909 (aged 69) Toronto, Ontario
- Party: Liberal
- Spouse: Mary Lydia Holman (m. 1867)
- Children: 8
- Occupation: Farmer

John Dryden (June 5, 1840 – July 29, 1909) was a farmer and politician in Ontario, Canada.

== Early life ==
Dryden was the son of James Dryden (1820–1881), a farmer, businessman and politician. The senior Dryden owned a successful farm near Winchester (later Brooklin), was a Reeve of Whitby Township, President of the Port Whitby and Port Perry Railway and a director of the Ontario Bank. Educated in nearby Whitby, John Dryden became the manager of his father's farm, doubling its size. He also became an expert breeder of sheep, horses, and cattle, and served in a leadership role in many agricultural and animal husbandry organizations.

Dryden married Mary Lydia Holman in 1867. They had three sons (two of whom died in infancy) and five daughters.

== Political career ==
Dryden's political career began in the local arena; in 1863, he was elected to the Whitby Township council, becoming Reeve in 1869 and 1870. In 1879, he was elected to the Legislative Assembly of Ontario as the Liberal member for the provincial Ontario South riding. He served in this capacity until 1905.

In 1890, Premier Oliver Mowat appointed Dryden Minister of Agriculture. As Minister, he oversaw reforms at the Ontario Agricultural College and was a strong supporter of agricultural training and instruction. He implemented a program of 'travelling dairies' whereby a portable horse-drawn dairy toured rural Ontario providing instruction to farmers. He also established dairy schools at Strathroy and Kingston. These measures were designed to improve the quality of dairy products produced in Ontario in an environment characterised by American tariffs and export challenges. Dryden remained minister through the governments of Mowat, Arthur Sturgis Hardy and George William Ross.

In 1895, Dryden set up an experimental farm near Wabigoon Lake in northwestern Ontario to test the agricultural potential of the area. The farm was closed by the incoming Conservative government after the 1905 election, but a village in the vicinity of the farm was named after Dryden. Dryden was incorporated as a Town in 1910. Dryden Township (now part of Greater Sudbury) is also named for the Minister.

Dryden was involved in a number of scandals during his time in office. In 1897, he appointed his brother George W. Dryden as the Registrar of Ontario County, causing dissension among fellow Liberals also interested in the job. The Conservatives also charged that Dryden had promised the position to several people in return for monetary compensation, and Dryden sued Conservative candidate William Smith for damages. Smith was unable to prove the allegations and was forced to withdraw the charges. Politically damaged, Dryden lost his seat in the 1898 Election. However, he refused to resign, challenged opponent Charles Calder in the courts and won the resulting by-election. Calder protested, necessitating another by-election, with Dryden emerging again as the victor. Rumours to the effect that Dryden bribed Calder to withdraw his protest persisted and hurt him politically. He was re-elected again in the 1902 Election but lost his seat in 1905.

== Baptist church ==
Dryden was an ardent Baptist, and served as a director of the Home Mission Society and a board member of the Baptist Convention of Ontario and Quebec. He was also a member of the Board of Trustees of Toronto Baptist College and continued to serve on the board of governors after the College became McMaster University.

== Later life ==
After his defeat, Dryden moved to Toronto and remained active. He continued his affiliation with McMaster, served as president of a number of insurance and savings companies and was appointed to an Imperial Royal Commission on agricultural conditions in Ireland. Dryden died in 1909 and was buried in a Baptist cemetery near Brooklin.

== Electoral history ==
1879 Ontario general election: Ontario South
Party	Candidate	Votes	%	±%
Liberal	John Dryden	1,721	56.24	+6.76
Conservative	Nicholas W. Brown	1,339	43.76	−6.76
Total valid votes		3,060	60.59	−12.32
Eligible voters		5,050		
Liberal gain from Conservative		Swing		+6.76
Source: Elections Ontario
