= Abram Farewell =

Canadian politician

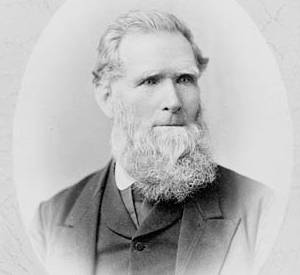

Ontario MPP
- In office 1871–1874
- Preceded by: William McGill
- Succeeded by: Nicholas W. Brown
- Constituency: Ontario South

Personal details
- Born: December 21, 1812 Harmony, Upper Canada
- Died: February 8, 1888 (aged 75) Oshawa, Ontario
- Party: Liberal
- Occupation: Businessman

Abram Farewell (December 21, 1812 – February 8, 1888) was a Canadian businessman and political figure. He represented Ontario South in the Legislative Assembly of Ontario from 1871 to 1875.

He was born in Harmony (now part of Oshawa) in Upper Canada in 1812 and taught school in Whitby Township. He later worked in his father's business before opening his own store in Harmony. He later became part-owner of ships transporting grain to American markets. He helped establish a firm which manufactured agricultural equipment and helped found the Bank of Toronto. He helped form the Port Whitby and Port Perry Railway and, with others, won a contract to build part of the Canadian Pacific Railway line between Fort William (now part of Thunder Bay, Ontario) and Selkirk, Manitoba. Although a so-called radical Reformer, he did not take part in the Upper Canada Rebellion. In 1843, he was elected to the council for the Home District and later became a member of the council for Ontario County. Although he presented himself as a candidate in the provincial legislature in almost every general election from 1854 to 1875, he was elected only once in 1871. He was also involved in the temperance movement in the region. He died in Oshawa in 1888.

== Electoral history ==
1871 Ontario general election: Ontario South
Party	Candidate	Votes	%	±%
Liberal	Abram Farewell	1,180	52.17	−4.18
Conservative	William McGill	1,082	47.83	+4.18
Turnout		2,262	65.81	−17.79
Eligible voters		3,437		
Liberal hold		Swing		−4.18
Source: Elections Ontario

1875 Ontario general election: Ontario South
Party	Candidate	Votes	%	±%
Conservative	Nicholas W. Brown	1,614	50.52	+2.68
Liberal	Abram Farewell	1,581	49.48	−2.68
Total valid votes		3,195	72.91	+7.10
Eligible voters		4,382		
Conservative gain from Liberal		Swing		+2.68
Source: Elections Ontario
