= William McGill (politician) =

Canadian politician

Ontario MPP
- In office 1867–1871
- Preceded by: Riding established
- Succeeded by: Abram Farewell
- Constituency: Ontario South

Personal details
- Born: 20 December 1814 Glasgow, Scotland
- Died: 9 November 1883 (aged 68)
- Party: Liberal
- Spouse: Julia Ann Bates (m. 1848)
- Occupation: Physician

William McGill (29 December 1814 – 9 November 1883) was a politician in Ontario, Canada. He represented Ontario South in the Legislative Assembly of Ontario as a Liberal member from 1867 to 1871.

McGillwas born in Glasgow, Scotland to a jeweller and watchmaker, and came to Whitby Township, Upper Canada with his parents while still young. McGill studied medicine at Willoughby Medical College in Ohio, received an MD from McGill College in 1848 and studied at Mott's medical school in New York City. He set up practice in Oshawa. In 1848, he married Julia Ann Bates. He was elected to the medical council of the college of physicians and surgeons of Ontario in 1866. In 1871, he was defeated by Abram Farewell in his bid for reelection to the legislative assembly. McGill served on the county council from 1874 to 1876. He became an elder of the Disciples Church.

== Electoral history ==
1867 Ontario general election: Ontario South
Party	Candidate	Votes	%
Liberal	William McGill	1,367	56.35
Conservative	D. Tucker	1,059	43.65
Total valid votes		2,426	83.60
Eligible voters		2,902	
Liberal pickup new district.			
Source: Elections Ontario

1871 Ontario general election: Ontario South
Party	Candidate	Votes	%	±%
Liberal	Abram Farewell	1,180	52.17	−4.18
Conservative	William McGill	1,082	47.83	+4.18
Turnout		2,262	65.81	−17.79
Eligible voters		3,437		
Liberal hold		Swing		−4.18
Source: Elections Ontario

== Bibliography ==
- William McGill – Ontario Legislative Assembly parliamentary history (archive)
- The Canadian Biographical Dictionary and Portrait Gallery of Eminent and Self-made Men. Vol. Ontario. Toronto: American Biographical Publishing Company. 1880. pp. 746–747.
- Canniff, Wm. (1894). The Medical Profession in Upper Canada, 1783-1850. Toronto: William Briggs. pp. 476–477.
- Farewell, J.E. (1907). County of Ontario: Short Notes as to the Early Settlement and Progress of the County. Whitby, Ontario: Gazette-Chronicle Press. pp. 22, 94.
