= W. E. N. Sinclair =

Canadian politician and barrister

W.E.N. Sinclair

Member of Parliament for Ontario
- In office 1945–1947
- Preceded by: William Henry Moore
- Succeeded by: Arthur Henry Williams

Leader of the Official Opposition (Ontario)
- In office August 1923 – June 1934
- Preceded by: Wellington Hay
- Succeeded by: George S. Henry

Ontario MPP
- In office 1934–1937
- Preceded by: New riding
- Succeeded by: Gordon Daniel Conant
- Constituency: Ontario
- In office 1919–1934
- Preceded by: Charles Calder
- Succeeded by: Riding abolished
- Constituency: Ontario South
- In office 1911–1914
- Preceded by: Charles Calder
- Succeeded by: Charles Calder
- Constituency: Ontario South

Mayor of Oshawa, Ontario
- In office 1911, 1915, 1932-34

Personal details
- Born: June 28, 1873 Whitby Township, Ontario
- Died: November 26, 1947 (aged 74) Ottawa, Ontario
- Party: Liberal
- Spouse(s): Ella Montgomery (1907–1918), Edna Worden
- Occupation: Lawyer

William Edmund Newton Sinclair (June 28, 1873 – November 26, 1947), known as W. E. N. Sinclair, was a Canadian barrister, solicitor and interim leader of the Ontario Liberal Party and Leader of the Opposition in Ontario from 1923 to 1930, leading the party through two general elections.

== Background ==
Sinclair was born in Whitby Township, Ontario, the son of John Sinclair, and was educated at Toronto University, receiving a bachelor's degree in law. In 1907, he married Ella Minerva Montgomery; he married Edna Worden in 1918 after his first wife's death.

== Politics ==
Sinclair was first elected to the Legislative Assembly of Ontario as a candidate of the Ontario Liberal Party in the 1911 provincial election but was defeated in 1914.

He returned to politics in the 1917 federal election on conscription (see Conscription Crisis of 1917), Sinclair ran on as part of the anti-conscription "Laurier Liberals" but was again defeated.

He returned to provincial politics and was elected again to the Ontario legislature in the 1919 provincial election as the MLA for the riding of Ontario South.

Sinclair ran for the leadership of the party in the 1922 leadership convention, but lost to Wellington Hay. Hay resigned following a disastrous election result, which included losing his own seat, and Sinclair served as interim leader of the Ontario Liberal Party from 1923 to 1930 and also as Leader of the Opposition in the provincial legislature. He was interim leader for that length of time (and through the elections of 1926 and 1929) because of the party's state of disorganization and inability to hold a proper leadership convention.

The Liberals remained at the 14 seats they had in 1926, and dropped to 13 seats in the 1929 election. Sinclair initially decided to run for the permanent leadership at the 1930 Liberal leadership convention, but because of the party's failure to make gains during his tenure, he attracted little support, and withdrew before balloting began. He remained Leader of the Opposition until the 1934 election because the newly elected leader, Mitchell Hepburn, did not have a seat in the provincial legislature. Sinclair was re-elected in the 1934 election that brought the Liberals to power but Hepburn, the new Premier of Ontario, did not appoint him to Cabinet. Sinclair sat as a government backbencher for three years and then retired from the legislature at the 1937 provincial election.

In the 1945 federal election, Sinclair was elected to the House of Commons of Canada for the Liberal Party of Canada. He died in office in 1947.

Sinclair also served as mayor of Oshawa from 1910 to 1911, in 1915 and from 1932 to 1934.

Party political offices
Preceded by Wellington Hay	(Interim) Leader of the Ontario Liberal Party; 1923–1930	Succeeded by Mitchell Hepburn
Preceded by Wellington Hay	Leader of the Opposition in the Ontario Legislature; 1923–1934	Succeeded by George Stewart Henry
