= 1943 Ontario Liberal Party leadership election =

1943 leadership election of the Ontario Liberal Party

- Date: April 30, 1943
- Convention: King Edward Hotel, Toronto, Ontario
- Resigning leader: Gordon Daniel Conant
- Won by: Harry Nixon
- Ballots: 1
- Candidates: 4

The 1943 Ontario Liberal Party leadership election was held on April 30, 1943, at the King Edward Hotel in Toronto to choose a new leader of the Ontario Liberal Party. The convention was won on the first ballot by Harry Nixon, who succeeded Gordon Daniel Conant as party leader and subsequently became Premier of Ontario.

The leadership contest followed the resignation of former premier Mitchell Hepburn, who had left office in October 1942 after a period of internal conflict within the Liberal government and party. Hepburn was succeeded as premier by Conant, who had served as attorney general. Because the Liberals were still in government, the leadership race also determined who would become premier.

Conant initially sought to remain leader and premier, but he withdrew from the race after suffering a collapse shortly before the convention vote. With Conant hospitalized, Thomas McQuesten was serving as acting premier on the day Nixon was elected leader.

== Background ==
The leadership contest took place during the final months of the Liberal government first elected under Mitchell Hepburn in the 1934 Ontario general election. Hepburn resigned as premier in October 1942 and was succeeded by Gordon Daniel Conant, who had served as attorney general in Hepburn's government.

Although Conant became premier, the question of the permanent party leadership remained unsettled. A leadership convention was called for April 1943, less than four months before the 1943 Ontario general election. Because the Liberals were still in office, the convention would also determine who was expected to become premier.

Conant was a candidate for the leadership, but withdrew after suffering a collapse shortly before the convention vote. With Conant hospitalized, Thomas McQuesten was serving as acting premier when Harry Nixon was elected leader on April 30, 1943. Nixon was sworn in as premier on May 18, 1943.

== Candidates ==
- Thomas McQuesten, 60, was the MPP for Hamilton—Wentworth and a senior cabinet minister. He had served as Minister of Public Works and Highways and as Minister of Municipal Affairs.
- Harry Nixon, 52, was the MPP for Brant. First elected in 1919 as a United Farmers of Ontario member, he later sat as a Progressive and Liberal-Progressive before joining the Liberals. Nixon had served as Provincial Secretary and Registrar of Ontario under both E. C. Drury and Mitchell Hepburn, and had led the Progressive and Liberal-Progressive group before joining the Liberal government.
- Arthur Roebuck, 65, was the federal Liberal MP for Trinity. He had previously served as MPP for Bellwoods and as Attorney General of Ontario in Hepburn's first government.
- Walter Thomson, 48, was a lawyer and rancher from Hastings County. He later served as a federal Liberal MP and became leader of the Ontario Liberal Party after the 1950 Ontario Liberal Party leadership election.

=== Withdrawn candidate ===
- Gordon Daniel Conant was the incumbent premier and former attorney general. He had been expected to contest the leadership but withdrew after suffering a collapse hours before the leadership vote.

== Results ==
Results were as follows:

Candidate	Votes	%
Harry Nixon	418	74.0
Arthur Roebuck	85	15.0
Thomas McQuesten	40	7.1
Walter Thomson	22	3.9
Total	573	100.0

There were 8 spoiled ballots.

The results were reported by the Toronto Daily Star on May 1, 1943.

== Aftermath ==
Nixon did not immediately become premier after winning the leadership. Because Conant was ill and still formally premier, McQuesten served as acting premier while arrangements were made for the transfer of office. Nixon was sworn in as premier on May 18, 1943.
