= Walter Thomson =

Canadian politician and lawyer

Walter Cunningham Thomson
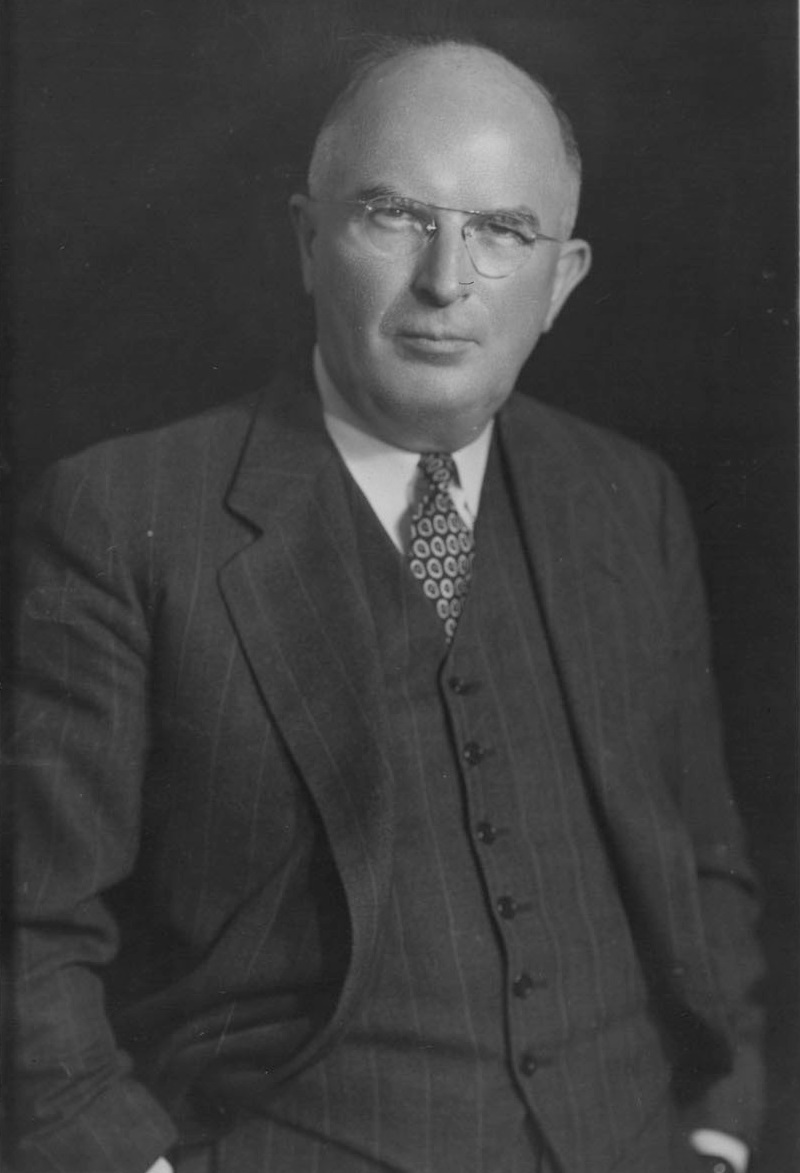

Leader of the Ontario Liberal Party
- In office 1950–1954
- Preceded by: Farquhar Oliver
- Succeeded by: Farquhar Oliver

Member of Parliament for Ontario
- In office 1949–1951
- Preceded by: Arthur Williams
- Succeeded by: Michael Starr

Personal details
- Born: December 21, 1895 Hastings County, Ontario, Canada
- Died: April 27, 1964 (aged 68)
- Party: Liberal
- Profession: Lawyer, rancher

Walter Cunningham Thomson (December 21, 1895 – April 27, 1964) was a Canadian politician, lawyer and rancher in Ontario, Canada. He was leader of the Ontario Liberal Party from 1950 to 1954 and was a federal Member of Parliament from 1949 to 1951.

Walter Cunningham Thomson was born on December 21, 1895 in Hastings, Ontario, the son of Reverend David Anderson Thomson and Janet née MacMillan.

On February 29, 1916, he enlisted into the army and was posted to the 93rd Battalion, Canadian Expeditionary Force, as a Lieutenant.

In 1923 he graduated from Osgoode Hall Law School in Toronto, Ontario as a solicitor. On June 25, 1924, he married Greeta Brophy Whitehead in Toronto.

In 1930 they settled on a dairy farm near Pickering, Ontario, where he opened a law practice in 1935.

In 1944 he was appointed as Ontario Solicitor for the Veteran’s Land Act.

Thomson first ran for the leadership of the Ontario Liberal Party at the 1943 leadership convention but came in fourth place losing to Harry Nixon. He was elected to the House of Commons of Canada in the 1949 federal election.

In 1950, he ran again in the 1950 Ontario Liberal leadership convention and won, defeating social reformer Harry Cassidy. He resigned his seat in the House of Commons the next year but in the 1951 Ontario provincial election, he failed to win election to the Legislative Assembly of Ontario, and the Liberals lost six of the 13 seats they had previously held. He remained leader of the party for another three years due to its state of disorganization. He resigned as leader on May 31, 1954, and was replaced by Farquhar Oliver.

On April 27, 1963, he died of a heart attack, whilst he was being treated at a Toronto hospital. Thomson was buried at the Erskine Cemetery in Dunbarton, Ontario.
