= Thomas Kelso Creighton =

Canadian politician (1892–1973)

Ontario MPP
- In office 1945–1948
- Preceded by: Arthur Henry Williams
- Succeeded by: Tommy Thomas
- Constituency: Ontario

Personal details
- Born: April 4, 1892; Dorchester, Ontario, Canada
- Died: October 20, 1973 (aged 81); Oshawa, Ontario, Canada
- Political party: Progressive Conservative
- Spouse: Esther Leroy Holmes
- Occupation: Lawyer

Thomas Kelso Creighton (April 4, 1892 - October 20, 1973) was a Canadian politician, who represented the riding of Ontario in the Legislative Assembly of Ontario from 1945 to 1948. He was a member of the Ontario Progressive Conservative Party.

Born April 4, 1892 in Dorchester, Ontario, Creighton was educated at the University of Toronto and Osgoode Hall, and was admitted to the bar as a lawyer in 1919. He practiced law in Oshawa, Ontario, and was appointed King's Counsel in 1938.

He died in Oshawa at the age of 81.
