= Gordon Daniel Conant =

Canadian politician

Gordon Daniel Conant QC
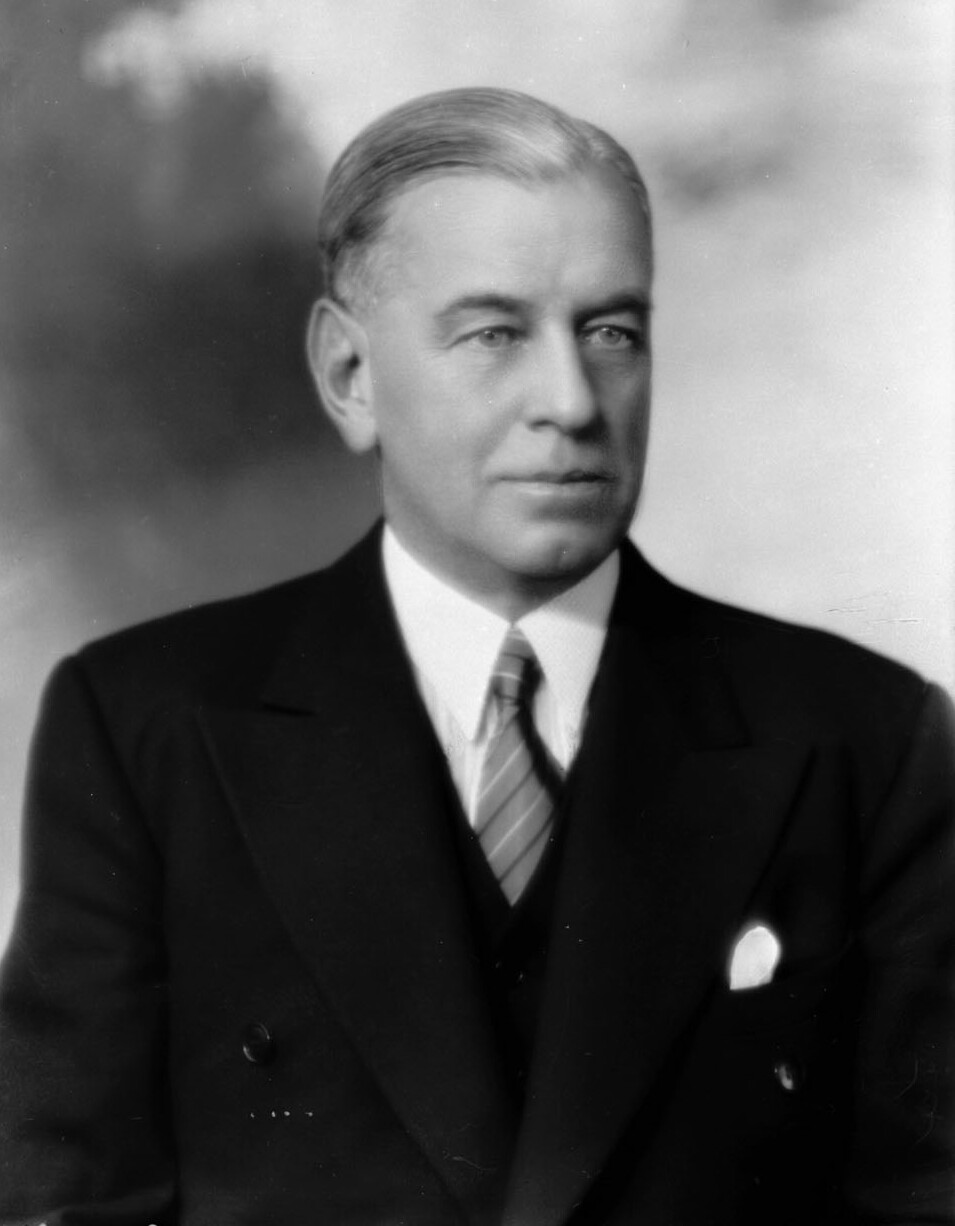
- Conant, c. 1937

12th Premier of Ontario
- In office October 21, 1942 – May 18, 1943
- Monarch: George VI
- Lieutenant Governor: Albert E. Matthews
- Preceded by: Mitchell Hepburn
- Succeeded by: Harry Nixon

Attorney General of Ontario
- In office October 12, 1937 – May 18, 1943
- Preceded by: Arthur Roebuck
- Succeeded by: Eric William Blake Cross

Leader of the Ontario Liberal Party (interim)
- In office October 21, 1942 – April 30, 1943
- Preceded by: Mitchell Hepburn
- Succeeded by: Harry Nixon

Member of the Legislative Assembly of Ontario for Ontario
- In office October 6, 1937 – June 30, 1943
- Preceded by: William Edmund Newton Sinclair
- Succeeded by: Arthur Henry Williams

Personal details
- Born: January 11, 1885 Cedar Dale, East Whitby Township, Ontario, Canada
- Died: January 2, 1953 (aged 67) Oshawa, Ontario, Canada
- Resting place: Oshawa Union Cemetery
- Party: Ontario Liberal
- Education: University of Toronto
- Profession: Lawyer

Gordon Daniel Conant QC (January 11, 1885 – January 2, 1953) was a Canadian lawyer, politician, and the 12th premier of Ontario, from 1942 to 1943.

== Personal life ==
Born in Cedar Dale, East Whitby Township (now part of the City of Oshawa) in Ontario, Conant was a member of one of Oshawa's early European families. He was educated at the University of Toronto and Osgoode Hall Law School, and was called to the Ontario Bar in 1912. He practiced law in Oshawa. In 1913 he married Verna Conant (née Smith), daughter of E. D. Smith. Together they had three children. Outside politics, Conant served as president of Oshawa General Hospital, Oshawa Chamber of Commerce, Rotary Club and South Ontario Canadian Club. In 1933, he was made a King's Counsel. From 1943 to 1951, he was a Master of the Supreme Court of Ontario. In 1944, he was awarded an honorary degree from the University of Toronto. Conant died on January 2, 1953.

== Municipal politics ==
In 1914, he was Deputy Reeve of Oshawa and Reeve in 1915. In 1916–1917, Conant became the youngest Mayor of Oshawa. After his office he dedicated himself to the development of hydro-electric power in Ontario. Due to his efforts, Ontario gained control of its own electrical system. In 1934, he became Crown Attorney for Ontario County.

== Provincial politics ==
In the 1937 elections, he was elected to the Legislative Assembly of Ontario representing the electoral district of Ontario. A Liberal, he was appointed Attorney-General of Ontario in 1937 in the government of Mitchell Hepburn.

Hepburn resigned suddenly, in October 1942, after a long series of erratic acts and especially due to his feud with Prime Minister William Lyon Mackenzie King that split Hepburn's cabinet and threatened the unity of his party. Hepburn announced that he was remaining leader of the party and Conant was selected as the new Premier by the Lieutenant Governor. The party, led by King's supporters, demanded a leadership convention and Conant and Hepburn were forced to acquiesce. Conant ran for the leadership but collapsed hours before the leadership vote and withdrew his candidacy. Former Provincial Secretary and Registrar Harry Nixon was elected new Liberal leader and was thus appointed Premier in May 1943.

== Commemorations ==
"Conant Street" in the Cedardale area of Oshawa is named after his family, as was the Conant Public School (now closed). Two other streets in the same neighbourhood were also named after him, "Gordon Street" and "Daniel Street".

On July 20, 1966, the Ontario Archaeological and Historic Sites Board unveiled a blue and gold plaque in Lakeview Park. On August 14, 1966, the plaque was stolen and a week later was found in 26 feet of water at the Oshawa Harbour by local diver Robert Stevenson. The plaque was later moved closer to Henry House (one-third of the Oshawa Museum).

In 2010, the Ontario Heritage Trust's Premier Gravesites Program placed a bronze/granite plaque and a Provincial flag outside the Mausoleum at Oshawa's Union Cemetery, where Conant is interred.

== See also ==
- Mitchell Hepburn#Resignation

Political offices
Preceded by Mitchell Hepburn	Premier of Ontario; 1942–1943	Succeeded by Harry Nixon
Party political offices
Preceded by Mitchell Hepburn	Leader of the Ontario Liberal Party; 1942–1943 (interim)	Succeeded by Harry Nixon
