= Matthew Dymond =

Canadian politician

Ontario MPP
- In office 1955–1975
- Preceded by: Tommy Thomas
- Succeeded by: Riding abolished
- Constituency: Ontario

Personal details
- Born: September 24, 1911 Aberdeenshire, Scotland
- Died: February 21, 1996 (aged 84)
- Party: Progressive Conservative
- Spouse: Phyllis Jeanne Clifton
- Children: 2
- Occupation: Physician

Military service
- Allegiance: Canadian
- Branch/service: Royal Canadian Army Medical Corps
- Years of service: 1942–1946
- Rank: Captain
- Unit: Surgical Division of Number 10 Canadian General Hospital
- Battles/wars: Western Europe

Matthew Bulloch Dymond, CM (September 24, 1911 – February 21, 1996) was a politician in Ontario, Canada. He was a Progressive Conservative member of the Legislative Assembly of Ontario from 1955 to 1975 who represented the riding of Ontario. He served as a cabinet minister in the governments of Leslie Frost and John Robarts.

== Background ==
Dymond was born in Aberdeenshire, Scotland, and emigrated to Canada in his teens, where he completed his high school education. He received his Doctor of Medicine, from Queen's University in 1941 and he did post-graduate work in Kingston and Toronto before joining the Royal Canadian Army Medical Corps. He served in Canada, England, and Western Europe with the Surgical Division of Number 10 Canadian General Hospital. After the war, he set up general practice in Port Perry, Ontario, in 1946. Dymond was married to Phyllis Jeanne (January 28, 1903 - March 25, 2002) and they had two daughters, Beverley (Livesay) and Nancy Dymond.

== Politics ==
Dymond started his political career as a Councillor in Port Perry, in 1948, and he later served on the School Board. Dymond won the Progressive Conservative provincial nomination in May 1955 on the fifth ballot, with 3,500 people voting. He won election to the Legislative Assembly of Ontario in the June 1955 provincial election representing the riding of Ontario. He soon joined Leslie Frost's cabinet as Minister of Reform Institutions in 1957. He briefly served as Minister of Transportation before becoming Minister of Health in 1958.

When Frost retired in 1961, Dymond ran in the PC leadership convention, coming in sixth place. He remained Minister of Health in the government of Frost's successor, John Robarts, until his resignation from cabinet in 1969. He oversaw the implementation of the Ontario Health Insurance Plan which is Ontario's version of Medicare. After leaving cabinet, Dymond remained a backbench Member of Provincial Parliament (MPP) until the 1975 election when he retired from politics and returned to his medical practice in Port Perry.

=== Cabinet positions ===
Robarts ministry, Province of Ontario (1961–1971)
Cabinet post (1)
Predecessor	Office	Successor
Mac Phillips	Minister of Health; 1958–1969	Thomas Wells
Frost ministry, Province of Ontario (1949–1961)
Cabinet posts (2)
Predecessor	Office	Successor
James Allan	Minister of Transportation; 1958 (April–December)	John Yaremko
John Foote	Minister of Reform Institutions; 1957-1958	Ray Connell
