= Tommy Thomas (politician) =

Canadian politician (1899–1980)

T.D. Thomas

Ontario MPP
- In office 1955–1963
- Preceded by: New riding
- Succeeded by: Albert Walker
- Constituency: Oshawa
- In office 1948–1955
- Preceded by: Thomas Kelso Creighton
- Succeeded by: Matthew Dymond
- Constituency: Ontario

Personal details
- Born: February 19, 1899 Cardiff, Wales
- Died: July 30, 1980 (aged 81) Oshawa, Ontario
- Party: CCF, New Democrat
- Spouse: Christine Murray
- Occupation: Automotive toolmaker

Thomas David "T.D." Thomas (February 19, 1899 – July 30, 1980) was a politician in Ontario, Canada. He was a CCF member of the Legislative Assembly of Ontario. He represented the ridings of Ontario from 1948 to 1955, and Oshawa from 1955 to 1963.

== Background ==
Thomas, who was known as "Tommy" or by his initials as "T.D. Thomas", was born in Cardiff, Wales in 1899. He emigrated to Canada in 1929 and worked for General Motors of Canada as a toolmaker.

He sat Board of Education of the Ontario County Township and was a director of the Oshawa General Hospital from 1952 to 1973. His wife Christine served on Oshawa City Council and later as Mayor of Oshawa in 1961 and 1962, the city's first woman mayor.

== Politics ==
Thomas served on the East Whitby Township council and was elected reeve in 1946 and 1947. He ran as the CCF candidate in the 1948 provincial election in the riding of Ontario. He defeated Progressive Conservative incumbent Thomas Creighton by about 2,600 votes. He was re-elected in 1951, 1955, and 1959.

In the 1963 election he ran under the banner of the new party as the New Democrat candidate. He was defeated by PC candidate Albert Walker by 682 votes.
