= Nicholas W. Brown (politician) =

Canadian politician (1821–1889)

Ontario MPP
- In office 1875–1879
- Preceded by: Abram Farewell
- Succeeded by: John Dryden
- Constituency: Ontario South

Personal details
- Born: August 8, 1821 Whitby, Ontario
- Died: November 21, 1889 (aged 68)
- Party: Conservative
- Spouse: Susan Chapman (m. 1845)
- Occupation: Manufacturer

Nicholas Wood Brown (August 8, 1821 – November 21, 1889) was a manufacturer and political figure in Ontario. He represented Ontario South in the Legislative Assembly of Ontario from 1875 to 1879 as a Conservative member. His name also appears as Nicholas William Brown.

He was born in Whitby, the son of Abram Brown and Bathsheba Wood, both of Scottish descent and who came to Ontario from Vermont. After completing his schooling, Brown farmed until the age of 18, when he learned carpentry. He next opened a carriage shop and then manufactured agricultural implements and machinery for twenty years. In 1845, he married Susan Chapman. Brown served as reeve and mayor for Whitby. He was defeated when he ran for reelection to the assembly in 1879.

== Electoral history ==
1875 Ontario general election: Ontario South
Party	Candidate	Votes	%	±%
Conservative	Nicholas W. Brown	1,614	50.52	+2.68
Liberal	Abram Farewell	1,581	49.48	−2.68
Total valid votes		3,195	72.91	+7.10
Eligible voters		4,382		
Conservative gain from Liberal		Swing		+2.68
Source: Elections Ontario

1879 Ontario general election: Ontario South
Party	Candidate	Votes	%	±%
Liberal	John Dryden	1,721	56.24	+6.76
Conservative	Nicholas W. Brown	1,339	43.76	−6.76
Total valid votes		3,060	60.59	−12.32
Eligible voters		5,050		
Liberal gain from Conservative		Swing		+6.76
Source: Elections Ontario
