= Harry Nixon =

Canadian politician (1891–1961)

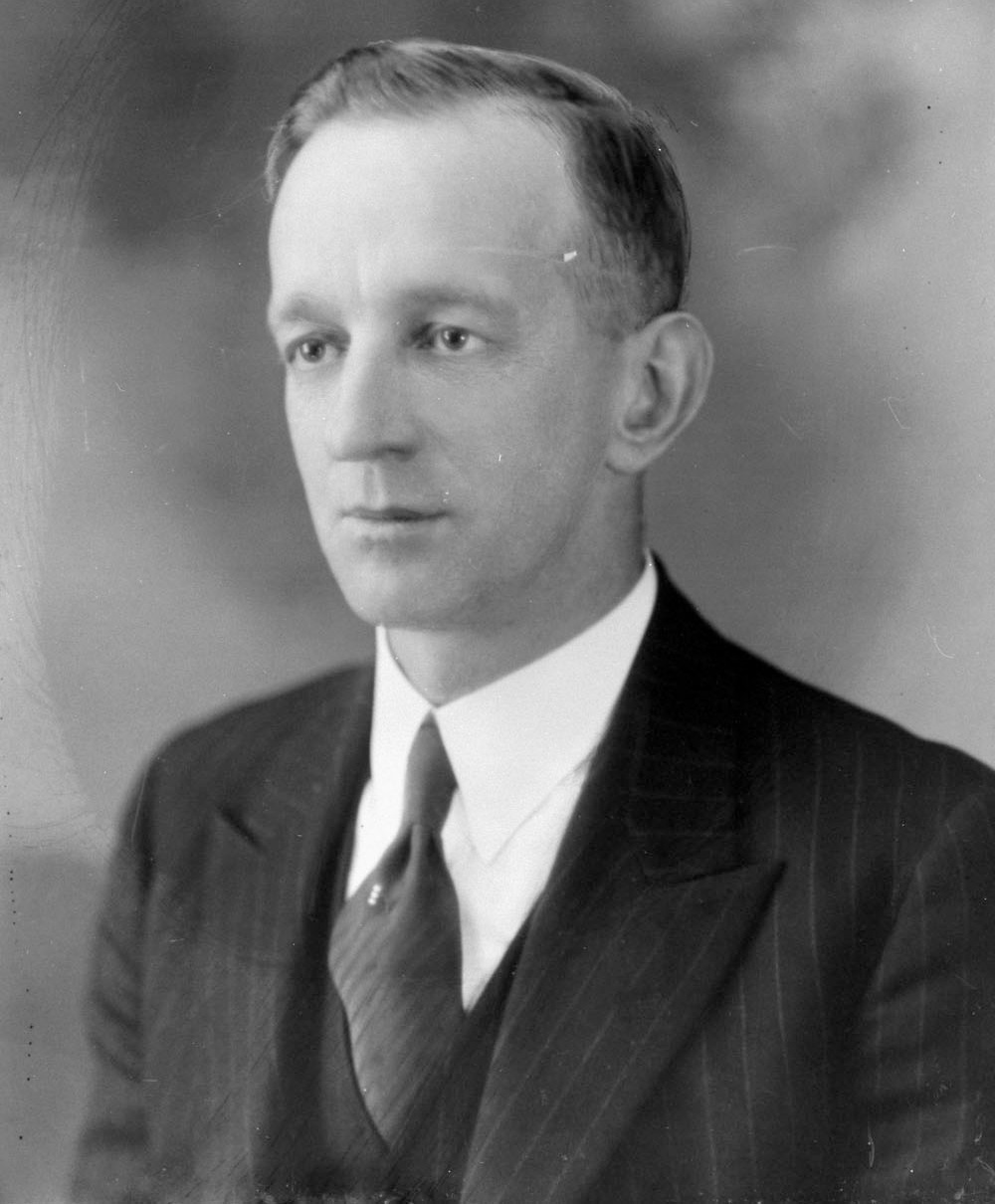
- Nixon in 1934

13th Premier of Ontario
- In office May 18, 1943 – August 17, 1943
- Monarch: George VI
- Lieutenant Governor: Albert E. Matthews
- Preceded by: Gordon Daniel Conant
- Succeeded by: George Drew

Member of the Ontario Provincial Parliament for Brant Brant North 1919–1926 Brant County 1926–1934
- In office October 20, 1919 – October 22, 1961
- Preceded by: Thomas Scott Davidson
- Succeeded by: Robert Nixon

Personal details
- Born: Harry Corwin Nixon; April 1, 1891 St. George, Ontario
- Died: October 22, 1961 (aged 70) St. George, Ontario
- Resting place: St. George United Cemetery
- Party: Ontario Liberal Party (1937–1961)
- Other political affiliations: United Farmers of Ontario (1919–1923); Progressive (1923–1934); Liberal-Progressive (1934–1937)
- Education: University of Toronto

Harry Corwin Nixon (April 1, 1891 – October 22, 1961) was a Canadian politician and briefly the 13th premier of Ontario in 1943. He is both the longest-serving member in the history of the Ontario legislature and the shortest-serving premier of Ontario.

== Life and career ==
Nixon was born on a farm near St. George, Ontario, the son of a dairy farmer, Henry Nixon, and studied at the University of Toronto's Ontario Agricultural College (then affiliated with the university).

He was first elected to the Legislative Assembly of Ontario in 1919 as a candidate of the United Farmers of Ontario. He served as a Cabinet minister in the government of Premier Ernest C. Drury as Provincial Secretary and Registrar. Following the defeat of the UFO-Labour government in the 1923 election, Nixon sat as a Progressive Member of the Legislative Assembly (MLA), and became the leader of the small Progressive bloc (as most UFOers now called themselves) after the 1929 election.

Mitchell Hepburn, a farmer and former UFO organizer, became leader of the Ontario Liberal Party, and Nixon led his Progressive remnant into an alliance with Hepburn's party. In the 1934 election, Nixon and his followers ran as Liberal-Progressives, helping bring the Hepburn to power. He ran and was elected as a Liberal in the 1937 election.

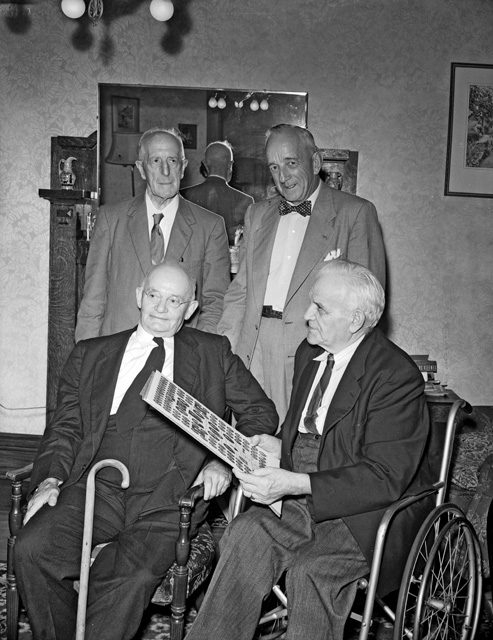
Last surviving members of the UFO-Labour coalition government (1919–1923) in 1955. From left to right: Harry Mills, E.C. Drury, Harry Nixon and Walter Rollo

Nixon resumed his former Cabinet position of Provincial Secretary and Registrar in the Hepburn cabinet and was the senior minister in the government. During World War II, Hepburn clashed with William Lyon Mackenzie King, the Liberal Prime Minister of Canada, arguing that King was not sufficiently prosecuting the war effort, in particular by not introducing conscription (see Conscription Crisis of 1944). Hepburn openly supported King's rival, Conservative leader Arthur Meighen in a 1942 York South by-election, and seemed to be calling for the defeat of King. This was too much for many Ontario Liberals, who were either King loyalists or feared a rift between the federal and provincial parties. Hepburn was forced to resign on October 21, 1942.

Nixon was widely seen as the "heir apparent," and had earlier turned down Hepburn's offer to recommend that Nixon be appointed Premier, as Nixon insisted the leadership should be the choice of the party, not of Hepburn. However, Hepburn, while resigning as Premier, insisted on remaining as party leader, and simply appointed his ally, Gordon Daniel Conant as the new Premier of Ontario on October 21, 1942. Nixon resigned from the cabinet on October 22, 1942, in opposition to Hepburn's refusal to allow a leadership convention to elect a new leader. Conant was forced to resign after only six months due to serious divisions in the party, and a leadership convention was called. Nixon was chosen as Liberal leader at the 1943 Ontario Liberal leadership convention, and thus appointed Premier in May 1943, but his government was unable to win the election held three months later, and the Liberals were reduced to third place behind George Drew's Progressive Conservatives and Ted Jolliffe's Co-operative Commonwealth Federation. Nixon resigned as Liberal leader on December 10, 1944, and nominated Hepburn as the party's House Leader (interim leader). Hepburn led to party into the 1945 provincial election.

Harry Nixon remained a Liberal Member of Provincial Parliament (MPP)^{1} until his death in 1961. His son, Robert Nixon succeeded him as MPP, and later became leader of the Liberal Party but never Premier. He served as Treasurer in the Cabinet of David Peterson from 1985 to 1990. Harry Nixon's granddaughter (and Robert Nixon's daughter) Jane Stewart served as a Cabinet minister in the federal Liberal government of Jean Chrétien.

== See also ==
- Mitchell Hepburn § Resignation

== Notes ==
^{1} In 1938, Members of the Ontario Legislative Assembly (MLAs) passed a motion to adopt the title "Members of Provincial Parliament" (MPP).

Political offices
Party political offices
Preceded by John Giles Lethbridge	Leader of the Progressives; 1929–1934	Succeeded by none
Preceded by Gordon Daniel Conant	Leader of the Ontario Liberal Party; 1943–1944	Succeeded by Mitchell Hepburn
