= Charles Calder (politician) =

Canadian politician (1852–1920)

Ontario MPP
- In office 1914 – 1919
- Preceded by: W. E. N. Sinclair
- Succeeded by: W. E. N. Sinclair
- In office 1905 – 1911
- Preceded by: John Dryden
- Succeeded by: W. E. N. Sinclair
- In office 1898 (March–October)
- Preceded by: John Dryden
- Succeeded by: John Dryden
- Constituency: Ontario South

Personal details
- Born: December 29, 1852; Whitby Township, Canada West
- Died: April 6, 1920 (aged 67); Brooklin, Ontario
- Political party: Conservative
- Occupation: Farmer

Charles Calder (December 29, 1852 – April 6, 1920) was an Ontario farmer and political figure. He represented Ontario South in the Legislative Assembly of Ontario in 1898 and from 1905 to 1919 as a Conservative member.

He was born in 1852 at Whitby Township, the son of John Calder, a Scottish immigrant, and was educated in Whitby. Calder served as reeve for Whitby Township from 1893 to 1896. He was elected to the provincial assembly in 1898 but that election was appealed and he lost the subsequent by-election to John Dryden. He defeated Dryden in 1905 to win his seat in the provincial assembly. Calder lived near Brooklin. He died in 1920 at his home in Brooklin.
