= Ontario Liberal Party =

Provincial political party in Ontario, Canada

Ontario Liberal Party Parti libéral de l'Ontario
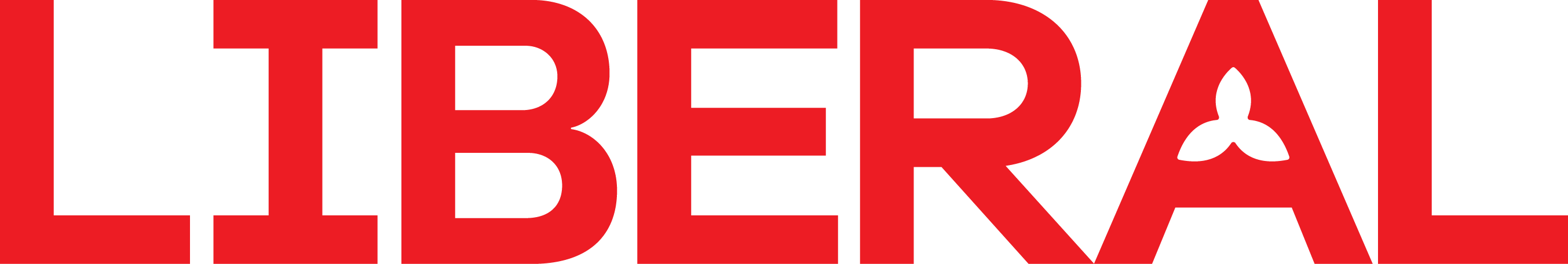
- Abbreviation: OLP; PLO
- Leader: Navdeep Bains
- President: Kathryn McGarry
- Parliamentary leader: John Fraser
- House leader: Lucille Collard
- Founder: George Brown
- Founded: 1857; 169 years ago
- Preceded by: Clear Grits
- Headquarters: 344 Bloor Street W Suite 404; Toronto, Ontario; M5S 3A7
- Youth wing: Ontario Young Liberals
- Membership (2026): ▼56,996
- Ideology: Liberalism (Canadian); Social liberalism
- Political position: Centre to centre-left
- National affiliation: Liberal Party of Canada (until 1976)
- Colours: Red
- Legislative Assembly: 14 / 124

Website
- ontarioliberal.ca

The Ontario Liberal Party (OLP; French: Parti libéral de l'Ontario, PLO) is a provincial political party in Ontario, Canada. It has been one of the two main contenders for government for much of Ontario's history along with their conservative rival (currently the Progressive Conservative Party). Liberal ministries governed the province 63 of the approximately 160 years since Confederation, producing 10 of its 26 premiers.

The party has strong informal ties to the Liberal Party of Canada, but the two parties are organizationally independent and have separate memberships. The provincial party and the Ontario wing of the federal party were organizationally one entity until members voted to split in 1976.

The party espouses the principles of liberalism, with their rival the Progressive Conservative (PC) Party positioned to the right and the New Democratic Party (NDP), which at times aligned itself with the Liberals during minority governments, positioned to their left.

The Liberals suffered its worst electoral defeat in the 2018 Ontario provincial election both in terms of seat count (seven) and popular vote (19.6%), losing official party status at the Legislative Assembly of Ontario. It was also the worst defeat of a governing party in Ontario history. Prior to the 2018 election, the party had won four consecutive elections since the turn of the century and had governed the province for the previous 15 years. In the 2022 provincial election, the Liberals saw a modest increase in support, finishing second in popular vote, but only winning eight seats.

In the most recent election in 2025, the party led by Bonnie Crombie won 14 seats and regained official party status. However, Crombie did not win her own seat and the Liberals remained the third-party in the Ontario legislature, despite having won a substantially larger share of the popular vote than the official opposition NDP (30% vs NDP's 18.6%).

== History ==
Oliver Mowat, the longest-serving premier of Ontario

Following Ontario's first ministry post Confederation (a predominately Conservative ministry led by a Liberal being opposed by the majority of the Liberals in the first legislative assembly), the Ontario Liberals went through an extended period of dominance, governing the province for 34 of the 50 years between Confederation and World War I. Sir Oliver Mowat, one of the Fathers of Confederation, led the party and the province for 24 of those years, and remains the province's longest-serving premier (and the third longest of any first minister in Canada).

It however spent much of the following century in the wilderness. Bitter internal division ended a nine-year Liberal government in 1943 and produced the province's shortest-serving premier to date in Harry Nixon. Follow four decades in opposition, David Peterson with the support of the NDP ended 42 consecutive years of Progressive Conservative rules in 1985, and led the province for five years. After the turn of the millennium, Dalton McGuinty led the party back to government in 2003. Kathleen Wynne, a minister in the McGuinty ministry, won the party's leadership in 2013, becoming the first woman to serve as Premier of Ontario, and the first openly gay person to serve as first minister anywhere in Canada. She led the party to its most recent victory in 2014, before leading it to its historic defeat in 2018.

Ontario Liberal Premiers

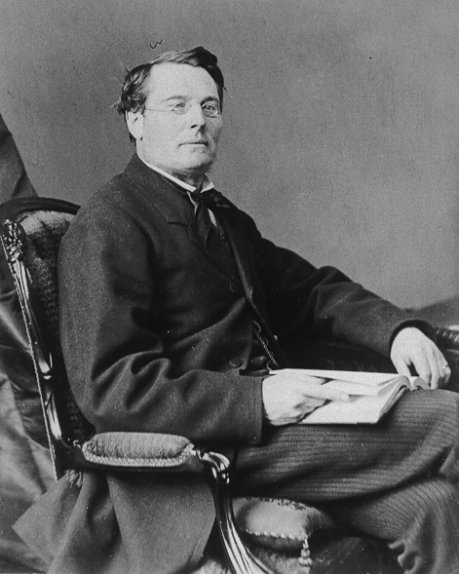
Edward Blake
Leader 1870-72
Premier 1871-72

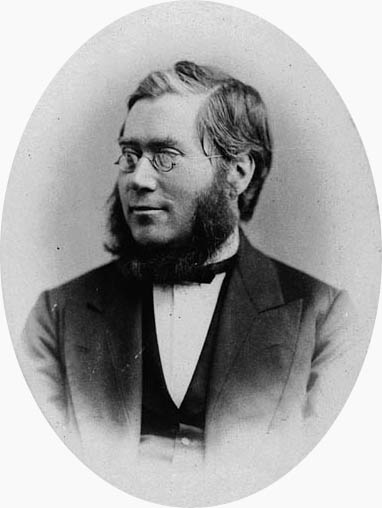
Sir Oliver Mowat
Premier & Leader
1872-96

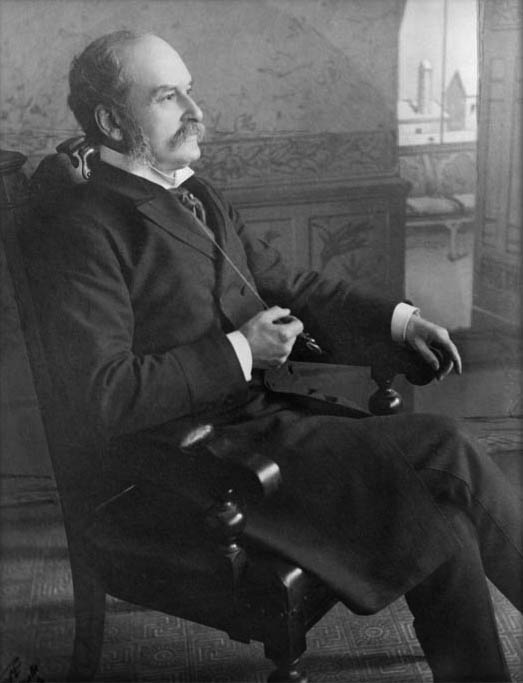
Arthur Sturgis Hardy
Premier & Leader
1896-99

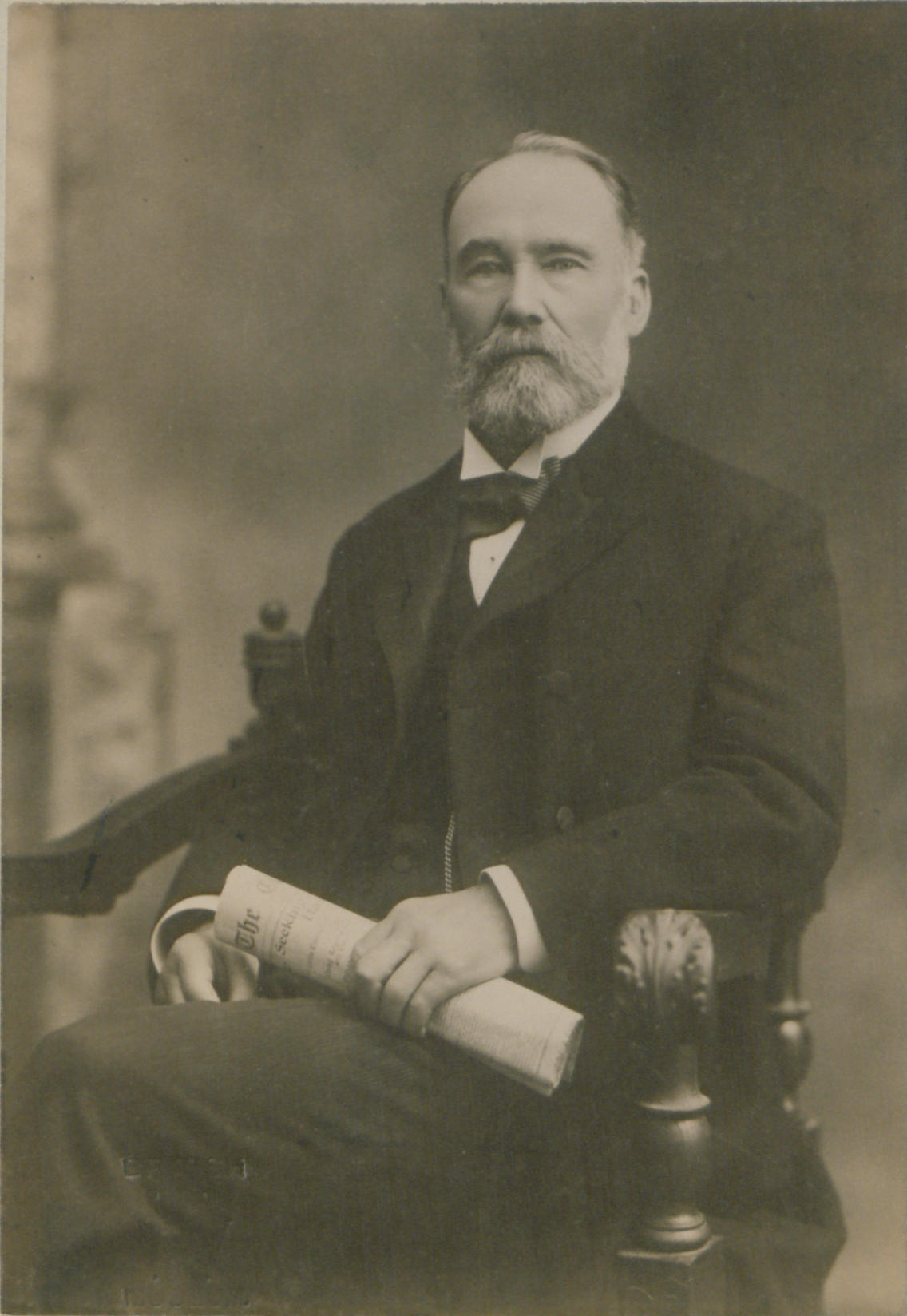
George William Ross
Premier 1899-1905
Leader 1899-1907

Mitchell Hepburn
Premier 1934-42
Leader 1930-43, 45

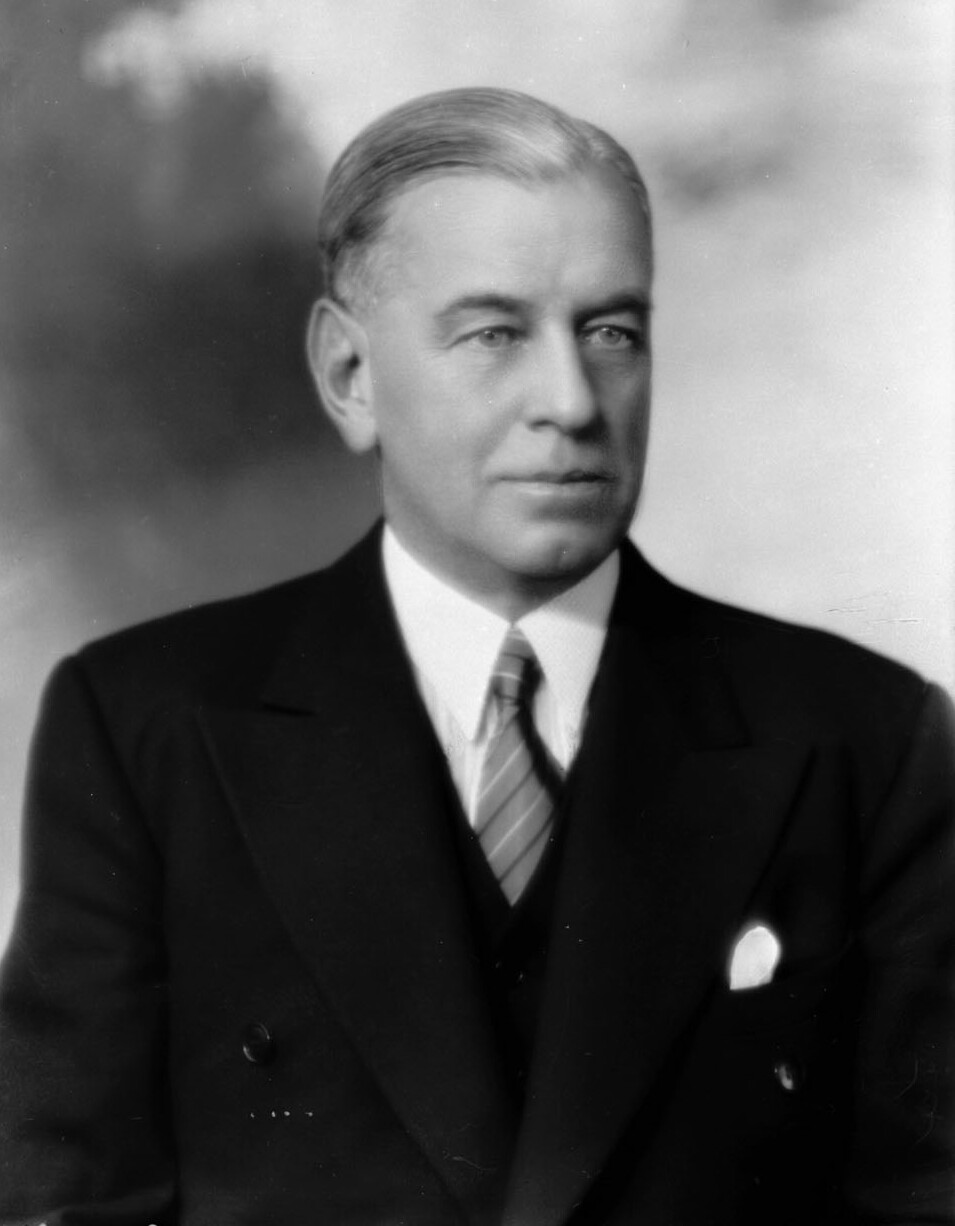
Gordon Daniel Conant
Premier 1942-43

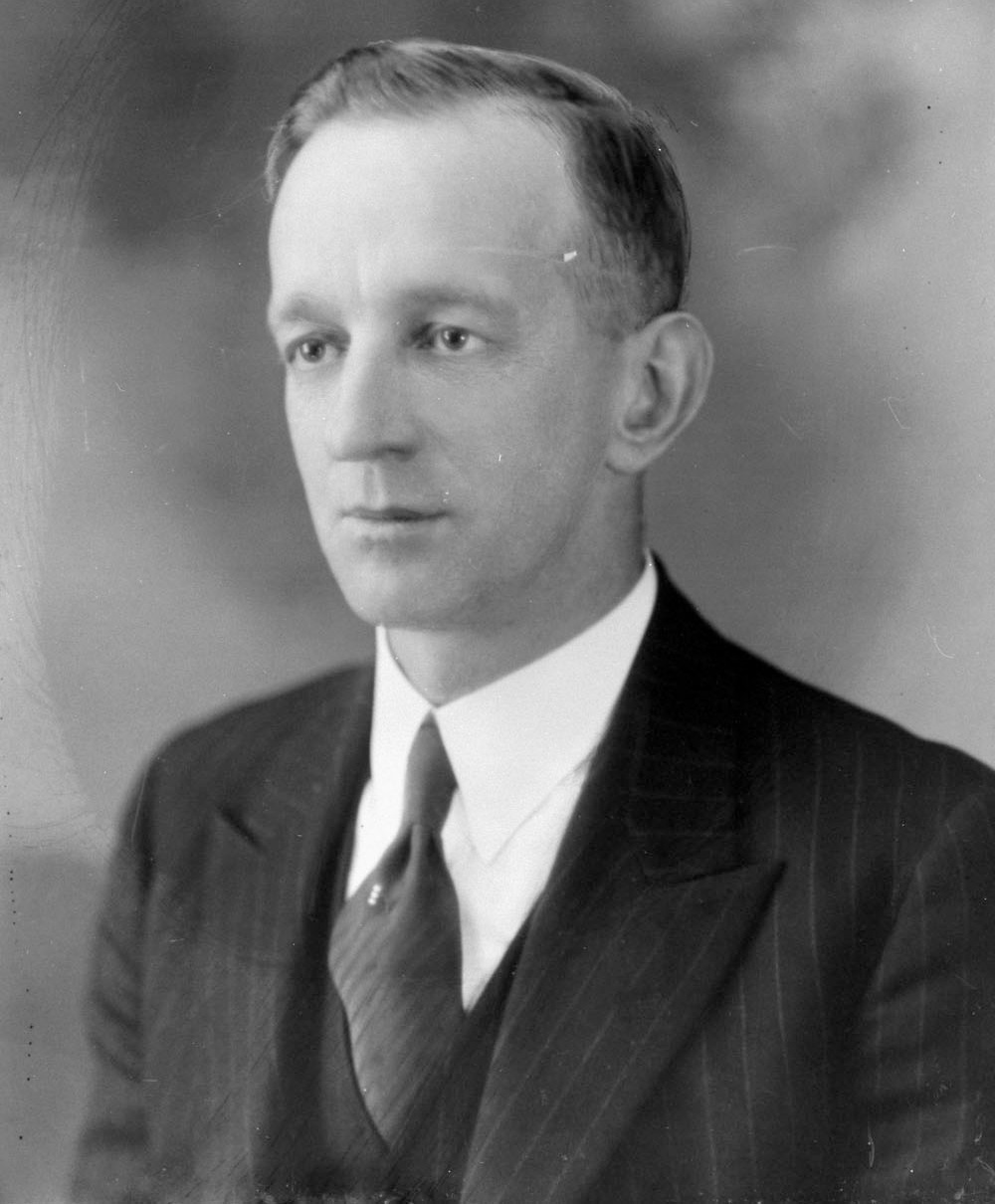
Harry Nixon
Premier 1943
Leader 1943-44

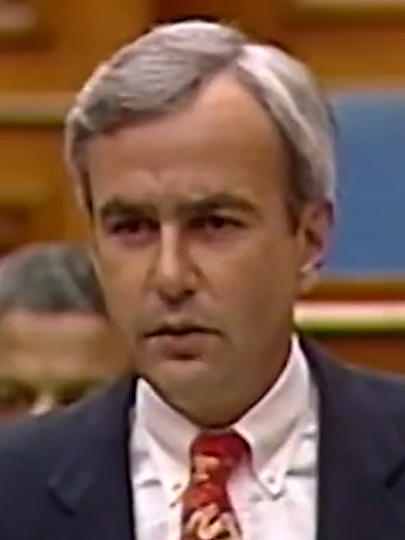
David Peterson
Premier 1985-90
Leader 1982-90

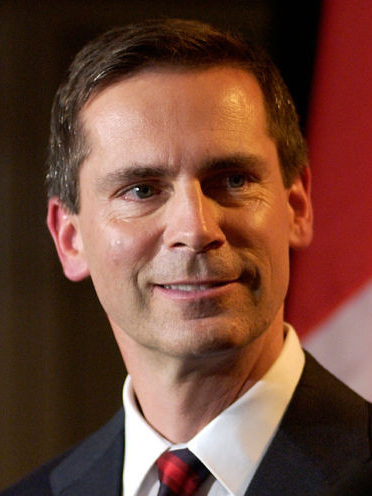
Dalton McGuinty
Premier 2003-13
Leader 1996-2013

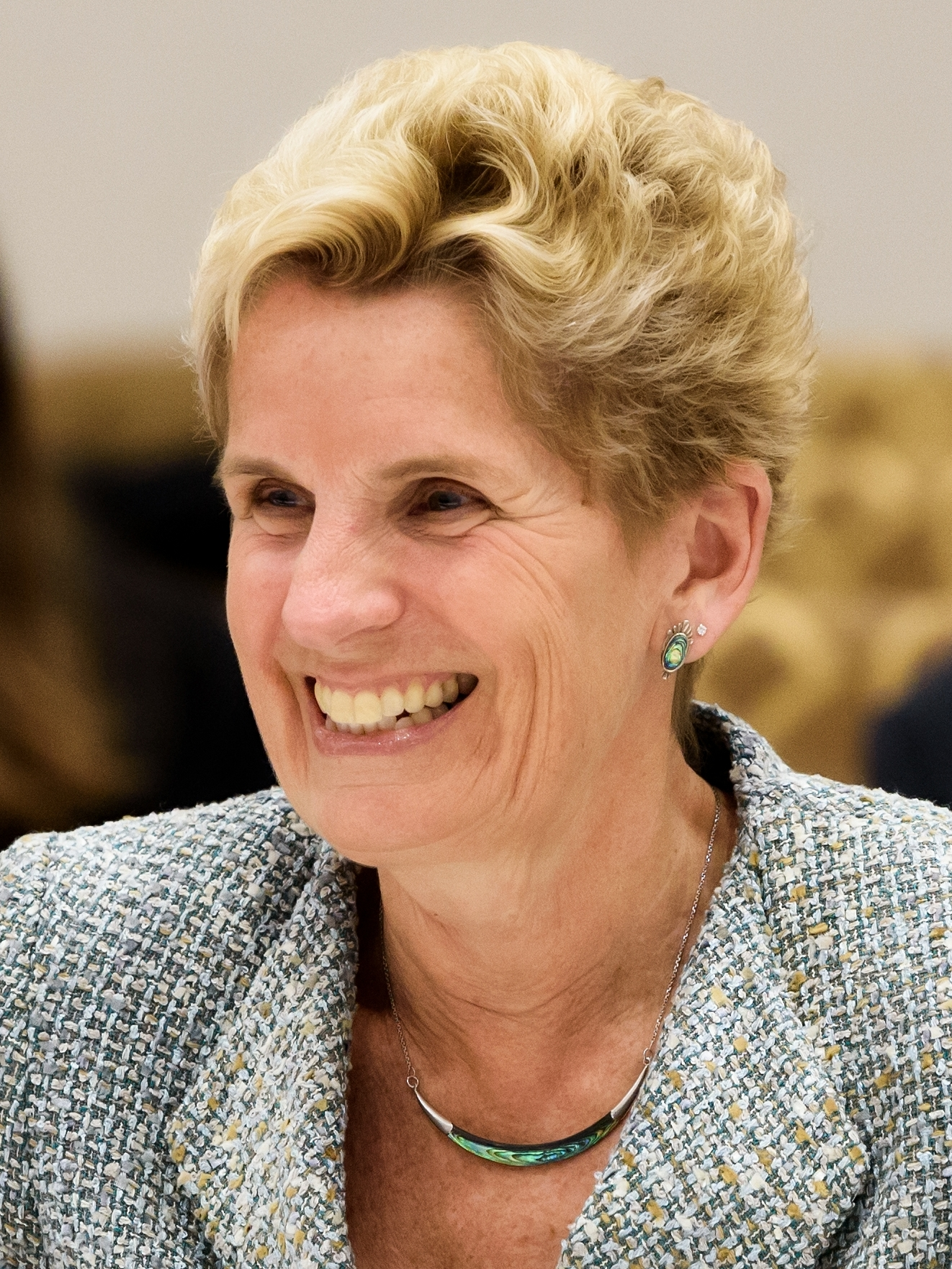
Kathleen Wynne
Premier & Leader
2013-18

=== Origins ===
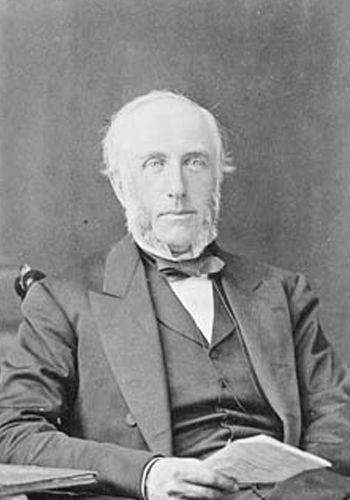
George Brown, founder of the Ontario Liberals

The Liberal Party of Ontario is descended from the Reform Party of Robert Baldwin and William Lyon Mackenzie, who argued for responsible government in the 1830s and 1840s against the conservative patrician rule of the Family Compact.

The Liberals were founded by George Brown, who sought to rebuild the Reform Party after its collapse in 1854. In 1857, Brown brought together the Reformers and the radical "Clear Grits" of Southwestern Ontario to create a new party in Upper Canada with a platform of democratic reform and annexation of the north-west. The party adopted a position in favour of uniting Britain's North American colonies, a concept that eventually led to Canadian Confederation.

=== Confederation ===
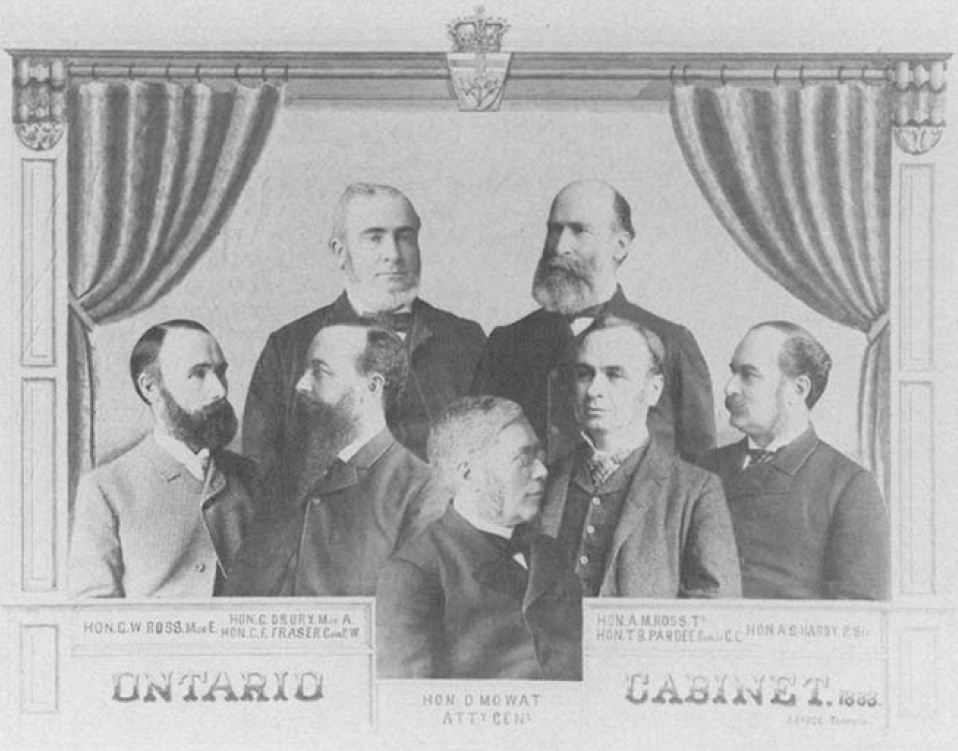
Mowat Ministry c. 1888

After 1867, Edward Blake became leader of the Ontario Liberal Party. The party sat in opposition to the Conservative government led by John Sandfield Macdonald. Blake's Liberals defeated the Tories in 1871, but Blake left Queen's Park for Ottawa the next year, leaving the provincial Liberals in the hands of Oliver Mowat. Mowat served as Premier of Ontario until 1896.

While the Tories became a narrow, sectarian Protestant party with a base in the Orange Order, the Liberals under Mowat attempted to bring together Catholics and Protestants, rural and urban interests under moderate, religiously liberal leadership.

=== Decline and shift to opposition ===
The Liberals were defeated in 1905 after over thirty years in power. The party had grown tired and arrogant in government and became increasingly cautious. As well, a growing anti-Catholic sectarian sentiment hurt the Liberals, particularly in Toronto where they were unable to win a seat from 1890 until 1916. The Liberals continued to decline after losing power, and, for a time, were eclipsed by the United Farmers of Ontario (UFO) when the Liberals were unable to attract the growing farmers' protest movement to its ranks.

Debates over the party's policy on liquor divided the membership, forced the resignation of at least one leader, Hartley Dewart, and drove away many reform-minded Liberals who supported the federal party under William Lyon Mackenzie King but found the provincial party too narrow and conservative to support. The party was so disorganized that it was led for seven years (and through two provincial elections) by an interim leader, W.E.N. Sinclair, as there was not enough money or a sufficient level of organization, and too many divisions within the party to hold a leadership convention. By 1930, the Liberals were reduced to a small, rural and prohibitionist rump with a base in Southwestern Ontario.

=== Return to power under Mitch Hepburn ===
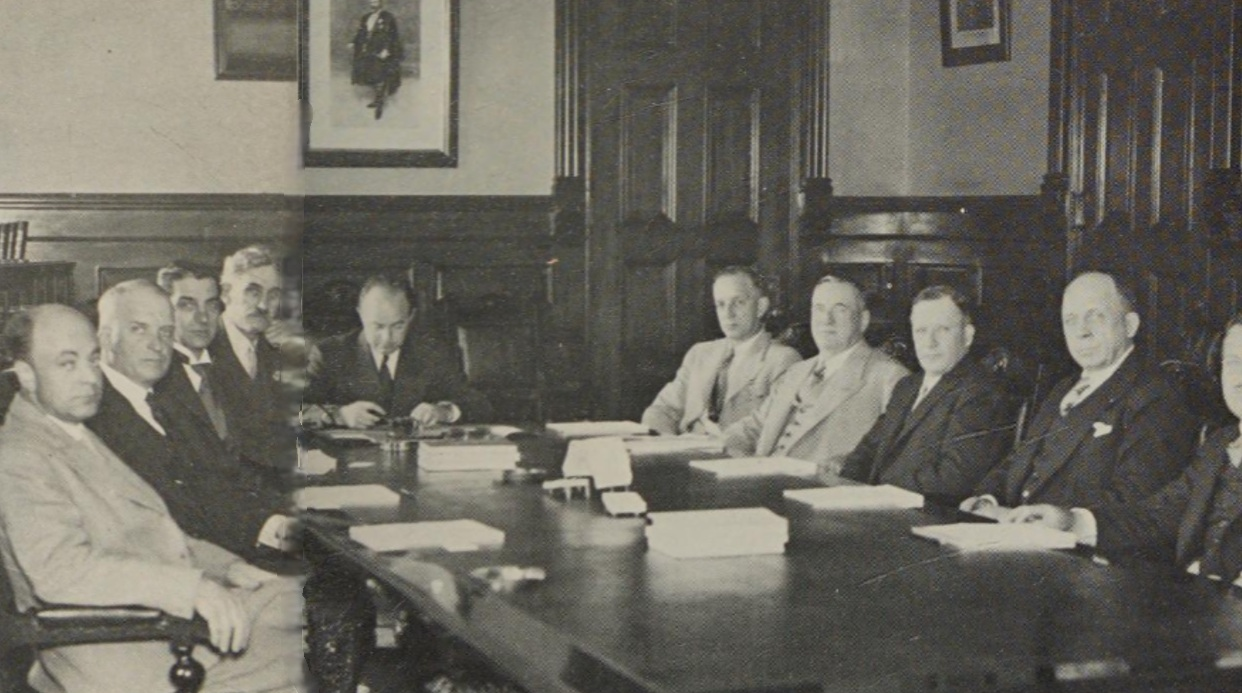

After a series of ineffective leaders, the Liberals turned to Mitchell Hepburn, an onion farmer, federal Member of Parliament and former member of the UFO. Hepburn was able to successfully build an electoral coalition with Liberal-Progressives which attracted both Reformers and urban voters to the party. The Liberal-Progressives had previously supported the UFO and the Progressive Party of Canada. A "wet", Hepburn was able to end the divisions in the party around the issue of temperance which had reduced it to a narrow sect. The revitalized party was able to win votes from rural farmers, particularly in Southwestern Ontario, urban Ontario, Catholics and Franco-Ontarians. It also had the advantage of not being in power at the onset of the Great Depression. With the economy in crisis, Ontarians looked for a new government, and Hepburn's populism was able to excite the province.

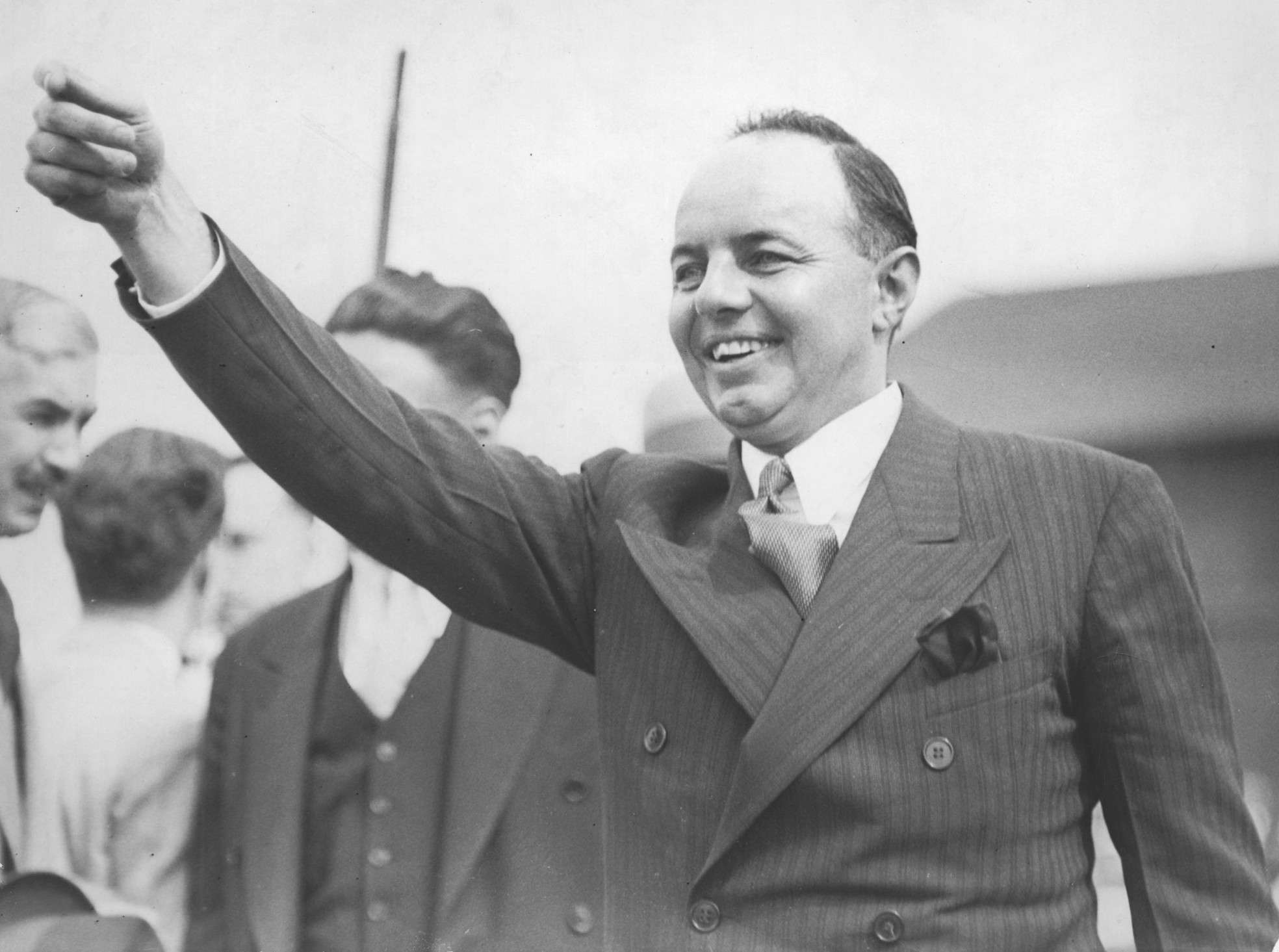
Hepburn pictured in 1937

In government, Hepburn's Liberals warred with organized labour led by the Congress of Industrial Organizations, who were trying to unionize the auto-sector. Later, he battled with the federal Liberal Party of Canada government of William Lyon Mackenzie King, which, Hepburn argued, was insufficiently supportive of the war effort. The battle between Hepburn and King split the Ontario Liberal Party and led to Hepburn's ouster as leader. It also contributed to the party's defeat in the 1943 election, which was followed by the party's long stint in opposition. The Liberals declined to a right wing, rural rump. The "Progressive Conservatives" under George Drew established a dynasty which was to rule Ontario for the next 42 years.

=== Opposition during the post-war boom ===
Ontario politics in recent times have been dominated by the Progressive Conservatives, also known as the Tories. The Liberals had formed the Government for only five years out of sixty years from 1943 to 2003. For forty-two years, from 1943 to 1985, the province was governed by the Tories. During this period, the Ontario Liberal Party was a rural, conservative rump with a southwestern Ontario base, and were often further to the right of the moderate Red Tory Conservative administrations. In 1964, the party changed their name from the "Ontario Liberal Association" to the "Liberal Party of Ontario".

In September 1964, the party elected Andy Thompson as its leader. While the leadership election garnered some attention, it looked like Thompson would have a hard time winning an election. The Liberals had held office only three times for 13 years since 1900 and the party caucus was not that much different from the time between 1959 and 1963. They failed to get a popular candidate, Charles Templeton, elected in a by-election. They also lost another riding to the PCs when Maurice Bélanger died in March 1964. Thompson would last only two years as leader before resigning due to stress-induced health problems.

Throughout the 1960s and 1970s, the Liberals were almost shut out of Metropolitan Toronto and other urban areas and, in 1975, fell to third place behind the Ontario New Democratic Party (NDP) under Stephen Lewis.

The Liberals remained more popular than the Tories among Catholic and Francophone voters, due to the party's support for extending separate school funding to include Grades 11–13. The Tories opposed this extension until 1985, when they suddenly reversed their position. This reversal angered traditional Conservative voters, and may have contributed to their defeat in the 1985 election.

=== The Peterson years ===
Logo of the Ontario Liberal Party from 1985 to 1990

The Ontario Liberal Party first broke the Tories' hold on the province in 1985 under the leadership of David Peterson. Peterson modernized the party and made it appealing to urban voters and immigrants who had previously supported the cautious government of Tory Premiers John Robarts and William Davis.

Peterson was able to form a minority government from 1985 to 1987 due to an accord signed with the Ontario NDP. Under this accord, the NDP agreed not to trigger an election via a non-confidence vote in exchange for the Liberals implementing certain agreed upon policies and not calling an election for the next two years.

Once the accord expired, an election was called and Peterson won a strong majority government with 95 seats, its most ever.

Peterson's government ruled in a time of economic plenty where occasional instances of fiscal imprudence were not much remarked on. Peterson was a close ally of Prime Minister Brian Mulroney on the Meech Lake Accord, but opposed Mulroney on the issue of free trade.

The majority Liberal government of 1987 to 1990 was less innovative than the previous minority government. The Liberals' increasing conservatism caused many centre-left voters to look at the Ontario NDP and its leader Bob Rae, and consider the social-democratic NDP as an alternative to the Liberals.

The Liberals went into the 1990 election with apparently strong support in the public opinion polls. This support quickly evaporated, however. On the campaign trail, the media reported that the Liberals were met by voters who were angry at going to the polls just three years into the government's mandate. Another negative factor was Peterson's association with Mulroney and the failed Meech Lake Accord attempt at constitutional reform, about which the public felt strongly. The campaign was also poorly run: a mid-campaign proposal to cut the provincial sales tax was a particularly bad blunder. The party had also underestimated the impact of the Patti Starr fundraising scandal, as well as allegations surrounding the Liberal government's links with land developers.

In the 1990 election, the Liberals only finished five points behind the NDP in the popular vote. However, the NDP took many seats from the Liberals in the Toronto suburbs. The NDP promised a return to the activist form of government that had prevailed from 1985 to 1987, and its co-operation with the Liberals during that time made it appear more moderate and acceptable to swing voters in the Toronto area. Due to the nature of the first-past-the-post system, the Liberals were decimated, falling from 95 seats to 36. The 59-seat loss surpassed the 48-seat loss in 1943 that began the Tories' long rule over the province. Peterson himself was heavily defeated in his own London-area riding by the NDP challenger.

=== Return to opposition ===
Logo of the Ontario Liberal Party from 1995 to 2002

By the 1995 election, the NDP government had become very unpopular due to perceived mismanagement, a few scandals, and because of the severe downturn in the economy. The Liberal Party was expected to replace the unpopular NDP, but it ran a poor campaign under leader Lyn McLeod, and was beaten by the Progressive Conservatives under Mike Harris. Harris swept to power on a right-wing "Common Sense Revolution" platform. In 1996, the Ontario Liberals selected Dalton McGuinty as their leader in a free-wheeling convention. Starting in fourth place, McGuinty's fiscally prudent record and moderate demeanor made him the second choice of a convention polarized around the candidacy of former Toronto Food Bank head Gerard Kennedy.

In the 1999 election, the governing Conservatives were reelected on the basis of strong economic growth and a negative campaign tightly focused on portraying McGuinty as "not up to the job". A poor performance in the leader's debate and a weak overall campaign hamstrung the new leader, but he was able to rally his party in the final weeks of the campaign. The Ontario Liberals garnered 40% of the vote, at the time their second-highest total in 50 years.

McGuinty's second term as opposition leader was more successful than his first. With the Liberals consolidated as the primary opposition to Harris's Progressive Conservatives, McGuinty was able to present his party as the "government in waiting". He hired a more skilled group of advisors and drafted former cabinet minister Greg Sorbara as party president. McGuinty also rebuilt the party's fundraising operation, launching the Ontario Liberal Fund. He personally rebuilt the party's platform to one that emphasized lowering class sizes, hiring more nurses, increasing environmental protections and "holding the line" on taxes in the buildup to the 2003 election. McGuinty also made a serious effort to improve his debating skills, and received coaching from Democratic Party trainers in the United States.

=== "Choose Change" the McGuinty government ===
Logo of the Ontario Liberal Party from 2002 to 2011

In the 2003 election, McGuinty led the Liberals to a majority government, winning 72 out of 103 seats. The PC government's record had already been marred by a number of prior events, including the death of Dudley George, the Walkerton water tragedy and the government's performance during the SARS outbreak. The PC's election campaign relied on attack ads against McGuinty, while the McGuinty campaign kept a positive message throughout. The PCs' negative attacks on McGuinty backfired throughout the campaign.

The new government called the Legislature back in session in late 2003, and passed a series of bills relating to its election promises. The government brought in auto insurance reforms (including a price cap), fixed election dates, rolled-back a series of corporate and personal tax cuts which had been scheduled for 2004, passed legislation which enshrined publicly funded Medicare into provincial law, hired more meat and water inspectors, opened up the provincially owned electricity companies to Freedom of Information laws and enacted a ban on partisan government advertising.

The McGuinty government also benefited from a scandal involving the previous Progressive Conservative government's management of Ontario Power Generation and Hydro One, which broke in the winter of 2003–04. It was revealed that a number of key figures associated with Mike Harris's "Common Sense Revolution" had received lucrative, untendered multimillion-dollar consulting contracts from these institutions. Among the figures named in the scandal were Tom Long, former Harris campaign chairman, Leslie Noble, former Harris campaign manager and Paul Rhodes, former Harris communications director.

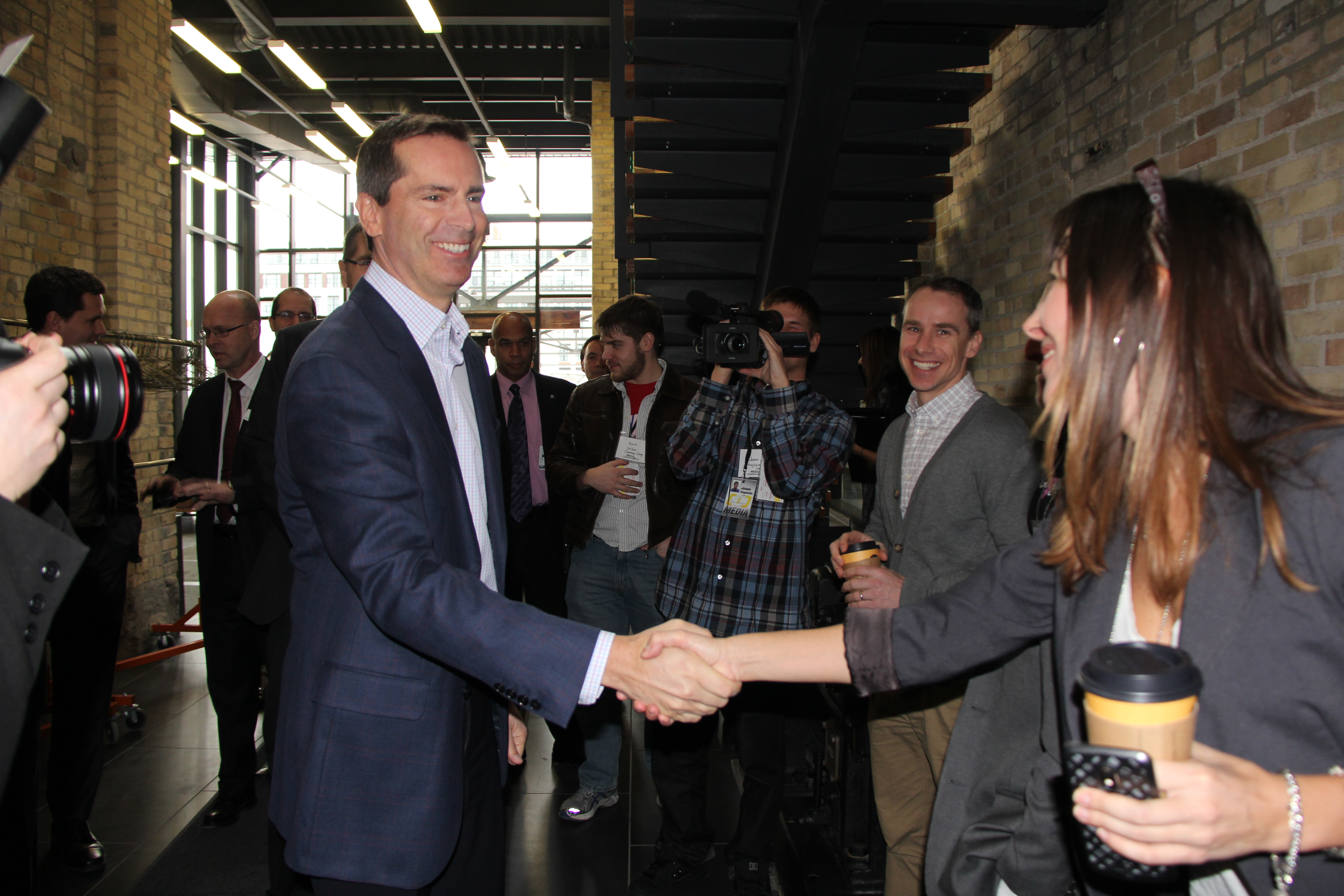
Dalton McGuinty, Leader 1996–2013

On May 18, 2004, Provincial Finance Minister Greg Sorbara released the McGuinty government's first budget. The centrepiece was a controversial new Health Premium of $300 to $900, staggered according to income. This violated a key Liberal campaign pledge not to raise taxes, and gave the government an early reputation for breaking promises. The Liberals defended the premium by pointing to the previous government's hidden deficit of $5.6 billion, and McGuinty claimed he needed to break his campaign pledge on taxation to fulfill his promises on other fronts.

The Ontario Health Premium also became a major issue in the early days of the 2004 federal election, called a week after the Ontario budget. Most believe that the controversy seriously hampered Liberal Prime Minister Paul Martin's bid for re-election.

Also controversial were the elimination of coverage for health services not covered by the Canada Health Act, including eye examinations and physical therapy. Other elements included a four-year plan to tackle the deficit left behind by the Progressive Conservatives, free immunization for children, investments in education and investments to lower waiting times for cancer care, cardiac care, joint replacement, MRI and CT scans.

Soon after the federal election, McGuinty hosted a federal-provincial summit on public health-care funding which resulted in a new agreement for a national health accord. This accord allowed the provincial Premiers and territorial leaders to draw more money from Ottawa for health services, and requires the federal government to take provincial concerns such as hospital waiting-lists into account. McGuinty's performance at the summit was generally applauded by the Canadian media.

The McGuinty government brought forward a number of regulatory initiatives in the fall of 2004. These included legislation allowing bring-your-own-wine in restaurants, banning junk food in public schools to promote healthier choices, outlawing smoking in public places and requiring students to stay in school until age 18. Following a series of high-profile maulings, the government also moved to ban pit bulls.

Logo of the Ontario Liberal Party from 2011 to 2013

During early 2005, McGuinty called the Legislature back for a rare winter session to debate and pass several high-profile bills. The government legislated a Greenbelt around Toronto. The size of Prince Edward Island, the Greenbelt protects a broad swath of land from development and preserves forests and farmland. In response to court decisions, the Liberals updated the definition of marriage to include homosexual couples.

McGuinty also launched a PR campaign to narrow the politically charged $23 billion gap between what Ontario contributes to the federal government and what is returned to Ontario in services. This came as a sharp turn after more than a year of cooperating with the federal government, but McGuinty pointed to the special deals worked out by the federal government with Newfoundland and Labrador and Nova Scotia as compromising the nature of equalization payments. In particular, McGuinty noted that immigrants in Ontario receive $800 in support from the federal government, while those in Quebec receive $3800.

In the 2003 campaign, the Liberals denounced public-private partnerships (also known as "3P" deals) for infrastructure projects such as the building of hospitals. Following the campaign, however, the McGuinty government allowed "3P" hospital construction deals arranged by the previous government to continue.

The Ontario Liberals won their second majority in a row on October 10, 2007, winning 71 of the province's 107 seats. Winning two majorities back to back is a feat that had not occurred for the party in 70 years.

In the next general election on October 6, 2011, McGuinty led the Liberals to win a historic third consecutive term and to once again form government, albeit with a minority of seats in the legislature. The Liberals won 53 of the 107 seats, just short of a 54-seat majority government. On October 15, 2012, McGuinty announced that he would resign as leader and Premier. At the end of January 2013, the party elected MPP Kathleen Wynne as leader, making her the 25th Premier of Ontario.

=== Majority under Wynne ===
Logo of the Ontario Liberal Party from 2013 to 2022

The June 12, 2014 election was triggered by the Ontario New Democratic Party's decision to reject the 2014 Ontario Budget. The Liberal Party under the leadership of Kathleen Wynne won 58 seats in the Legislature, and formed a majority government.

In 2015, the Liberals proposed to sell 60 per cent of the province's $16-billion share of the province's electricity distribution utility, Hydro One. Hydro One Brampton and Hydro One Networks' distribution arm would be spun off into a separate company and sold outright for up to $3 billion.

The government pivoted to the left in the lead up to the 2018 election by raising the minimum wage, introducing reforms to employment standards and labour law, bringing in a limited form of pharmacare and promising universal child care.

=== Losing government and official party status ===
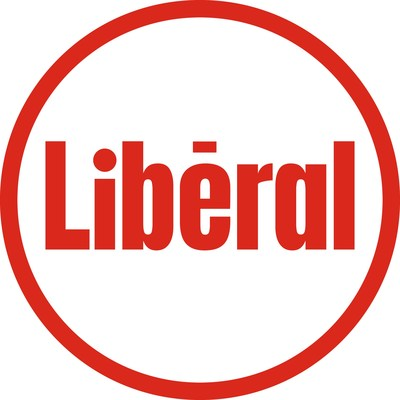
Logo of the Ontario Liberal Party from 2022 to 2024

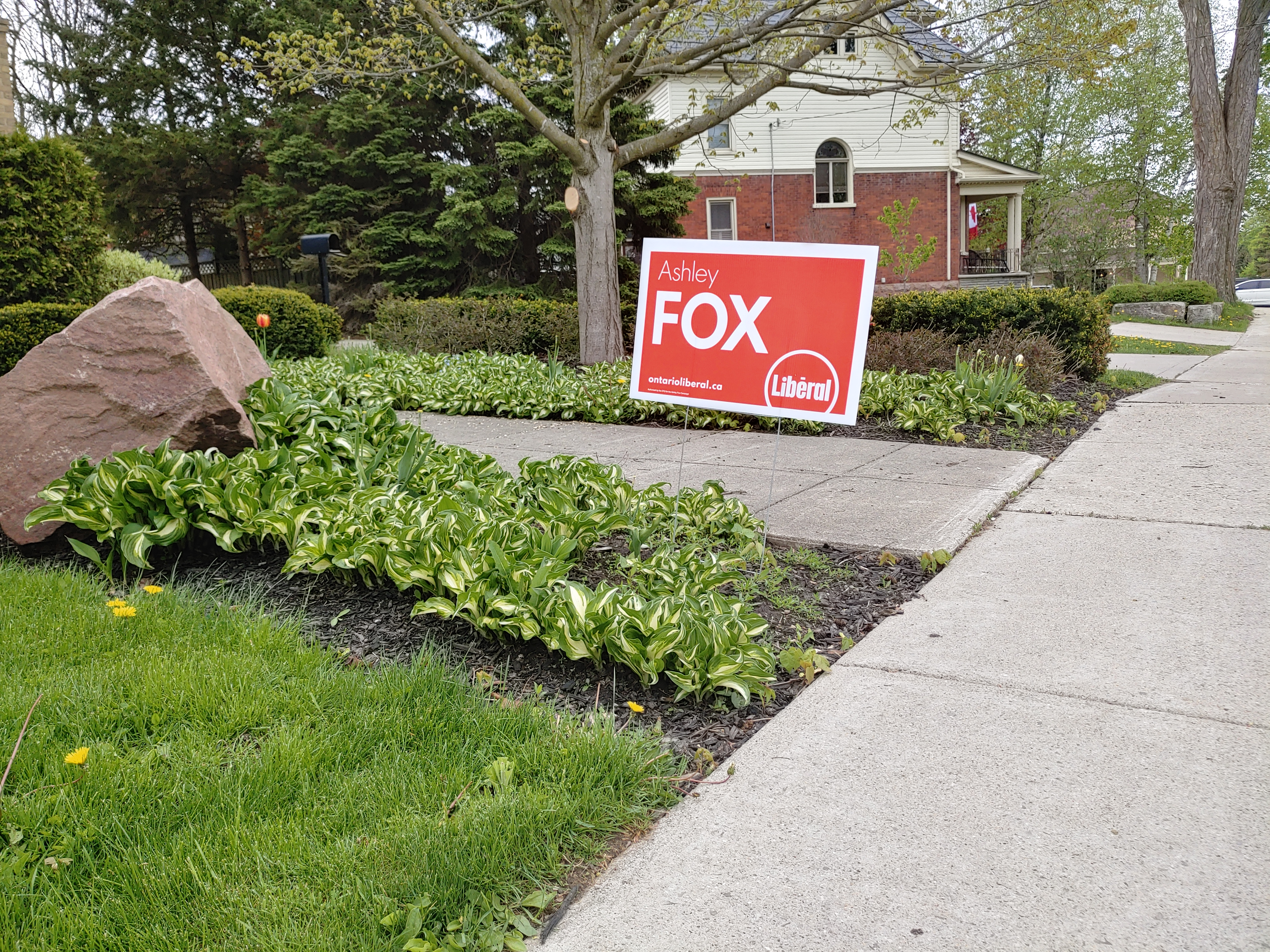
A sign advertising the Ontario Liberal Party in the 2022 election

In the 2018 general election, the Liberals were swept from power in a historic defeat that resulted in large gains for both the Progressive Conservatives and NDP. The Liberal popular vote fell to 19%, almost half their previous result; the party lost 51 seats and were reduced to a rump of only seven seats in a swing that elected a PC majority and made the NDP the official opposition.

Notably, the Liberals lost all but three of their 18 seats in Toronto, were completely shut out in the 905 region and won only one seat outside of Toronto and Ottawa. The seven-member rump caucus was one short of the requirement to retain official status in the Ontario legislature, and was also the only remnant of Wynne's cabinet. Wynne herself barely held onto her own seat by 181 votes. Accepting responsibility for the worst showing in the party's 161-year history and the worst defeat of a sitting government in Ontario, Wynne resigned as Liberal leader on election night.

On June 14, 2018, John Fraser was appointed as interim leader of the party following a vote by caucus members, riding association presidents, and party executives.

In the 2018 municipal election later in the year, six of the defeated Liberal MPPs — Bill Mauro, Kathryn McGarry, Jim Bradley, Mike Colle, Granville Anderson and Dipika Damerla — were elected to municipal office as mayors, city councillors or regional councillors.

In March 2020, the party elected former Cabinet Minister Steven Del Duca as leader, who defeated five other candidates on the first ballot at the leadership convention.

In the 2022 general election, the Liberals finished second in popular vote but gained only one seat, once again falling short of official status by four seats. After failing to win in his own riding, leader Steven Del Duca announced his resignation as party leader. John Fraser, who previously served as interim leader from 2018 until 2020, was unanimously selected to serve as interim leader until the new leader was chosen.

The Liberals increased their caucus on July 27, 2023, when they won a pair of by-elections, retaining the seat of Scarborough—Guildwood and gaining the seat of Kanata—Carleton, a seat which had not elected a Liberal in several decades.

On December 2, 2023, the Ontario Liberal Party elected Bonnie Crombie, the then-mayor of Mississauga, as the next leader of the party, defeating MP Nate Erskine-Smith, MP Yasir Naqvi, and MPP Ted Hsu.

Secondary logo of the Ontario Liberal Party since 2024

On September 21, 2024, the Ontario Liberal Party unveiled their new logo alongside their slogan, "More for You."

=== Regaining official party status ===
In the 2025 Ontario general election, the party, led by Bonnie Crombie, won 14 seats and regained official party status. However, Crombie did not win her own seat and the Liberals remained the third party in the Legislative Assembly of Ontario, despite winning a substantially larger share of the popular vote than the official opposition NDP (29.9% versus 18.6%). Following Crombie's resignation in January 2026, John Fraser served as interim leader until Navdeep Bains was elected party leader on November 21, 2026.

== Current Ontario Liberal caucus ==
Following the 2025 Ontario general election, the Liberal Party regained recognition as an opposition caucus in the 44th parliament with 14 members. The nine members who served in the 43rd parliament, all re-elected, were joined by five new members, three of whom contested their seats unsuccessfully in the 2022 election. Not among the 2025 returned members was party leader Bonnie Crombie, who subsequently resigned the leadership after a disappointing leadership review vote.

Five of the 14 members were first elected in by-elections. Caucus membership is currently heavily concentrated in Toronto and Ottawa, respectively, the provincial and national capitals. Only one member, Ted Hsu of Kingston and the Islands, represents an electoral district not in or immediately adjacent to those two cities. While lacking in regional representation, the caucus members better reflect the diversity of Ontario's population than the other two caucuses in the legislature, with seven women, four visible minority persons, two Franco-Ontarians, and one openly gay person among its ranks.

The party is currently led by Ottawa South MPP John Fraser, who is serving his third stint as interim leader of the party, and has been serving as parliamentary leader continuously since 2018. First elected in 2013, He is the most senior member of the Liberal caucus, and since 2023 the only opposition member remaining with experience on the government bench. (Note: Though Kanata—Carleton MPP Karen McCrimmon have served on the government bench in the House of Commons.) The party will elect its next permanent leader in November 2026.

=== Critic portfolios ===
Former party leader Bonnie Crombie announced assignments of critic roles for the 44th Parliament on March 21, 2025. The assignments in certain policy areas deviate substantially from the lineup of the ministry, leading to multiple members shadowing a single minister and some members shadowing many ministers. For example, four Liberal MPPs share responsibility for shadowing the economic development minister. One of them, Stephan Blais, also shadows four other ministers in addition to being caucus chair. All caucus members are assigned shadowing responsibility of at least two portfolio ministers, except Karen McCrimmon, who shadows the Solicitor General exclusively.

=== List of MPPs currently in office ===
Member	Elx	District	Region	Critic portfolio and notes
Rob Cerjanec	2025	Ajax	GTA (East)	Economic development and innovation; tourism, sport and culture
Mary-Margaret McMahon	2022	Beaches—East York	Toronto	Environment and climate; emergency management
Adil Shamji	2022	Don Valley East	Toronto (Metro)	Chief Whip; Housing; primary care, urgent care and public health; indigenous affairs
Jonathan Tsao	2025	Don Valley North	Toronto (Metro)	Citizenship and immigration; community and social services; children and youth services
Stephanie Bowman	2022	Don Valley West	Toronto (Metro)	Deputy House Leader; Finance; treasury board; interprovincial trade, tariffs and international trade
Lee Fairclough	2025	Etobicoke—Lakeshore	Toronto (Metro)	Hospitals, mental health, addictions and homelessness
Karen McCrimmon	2023 (Note: first elected via by-election)	Kanata—Carleton	East (Ottawa)	Public Safety, cybersecurity and crime prevention; solicitor general Previously served as MP 2015–21
Ted Hsu	2022	Kingston and the Islands	East	Energy; agriculture; rural issues; natural resources, mining and forestry Previously served as MP 2011–15
Tyler Watt	2025	Nepean	East (Ottawa)	Training, colleges and universities; long term care
Stephen Blais	2020	Orléans	East (Ottawa)	Caucus Chair; Infrastructure; municipalities; middle class prosperity; government services and procurement; red tape reduction
John Fraser	2013	Ottawa South	East (Ottawa)	Interim leader (2018–20, '22–23, since '26); Parliamentary leader (since 2018); Labour; education
Lucille Collard	2020	Ottawa—Vanier	East (Ottawa)	House leader Attorney General; francophone affairs; and French language education
Andrea Hazell	2023	Scarborough—Guildwood	Toronto (Metro)	Transportation; small business; women
Stephanie Smyth	2025	Toronto—St. Paul's	Toronto	Deputy Whip; Ethics, integrity and accountability; northern affairs; seniors and accessibility

== Ontario Liberal Executive Council ==
The executive of the Ontario Liberal Party is elected to a 12 to 18 month term at the Annual General Meeting.

2025–26 Party Executive
Position	Name
Leader	Navdeep Bains
President	Kathryn McGarry
Executive Vice President	David Farrow
Treasurer	Gabriel Sékaly
Secretary	Pankaj Sandhu
Vice President (Policy)	Fahim Khan
Vice President (Organization)	Meagan Trush
Vice President (Communications)	Hunter Knifton
Vice President (Engagement)	David Morris
Past President	Brian Johns
Regional Vice President for Central East	Zachary Hatton
Regional Vice President for Central North	Sam Azad
Regional Vice President for Central West	Sukhwant Theti
Regional Vice President for the East	Matthew Gagné
Regional Vice President for the North	Stephen Margarit
Regional Vice President South Central	Doug Varley
Regional Vice President South West	Bob Wright
Regional Vice President for Toronto (E/D/EY)	Noah Parker
Regional Vice President (Y/NY/S)	Lawrence Dawkins
OYL President	Palwashah Ali
OWLC President	Marilyn Raphael
OLRNC President	Roger Martin
OSC President	Sheila Bryan

== Leaders ==
No.	Photo	Leader	Time in Office	Note and office held
—		George Brown	1857–1867	Unofficial. Served as Premier of Canada West (August 2–6, 1858) as leader of the Clear Grits (a predecessor of both the Ontario Liberal Party and Liberal Party of Canada) prior to Confederation.
1		Archibald McKellar	1867 – 1870	Led the Reformers in opposition as one of George Brown's principal protégé and the most experienced Reformer during the 1st Parliament of Ontario, formally recognized as Ontario's first leader of the opposition. Later served in Blake and Mowat ministries.
2		Edward Blake	1870 – 1872 2nd Premier (December 20, 1871 – October 25, 1872) (Blake ministry)	First official leader. Won election held in March 1871 but did not become Premier until December due to Premier John Sandfield Macdonald's refusal to resign or call the assembly into session. Left provincial politics upon the abolition of dual mandate. Served as leader of the federal Liberal Party from 1880 to 1887.
3		Sir Oliver Mowat	1872 – 1896 3rd Premier (October 25, 1872 – July 21, 1896) (Mowat ministry)	Longest serving Premier of Ontario (third longest in Canada), won six consecutive majority electoral mandates. Offices held Member of the Legislative Assembly of the Province of Canada (1858–67) Member of the Liberal ministries led by George Brown and John Sandfield Macdonald and in the Great Coalition led by John A Macdonald (1858, 1863–64) Left provincial politics to be Ontario lieutenant of national Liberal leader Wilfrid Laurier during the 1896 dominion election Appointed a senator and served as federal Minister of Justice in the Laurier ministry Eighth Lieutenant Governor of Ontario
4		Arthur S. Hardy	1896 – 1899 4th Premier (July 21, 1896 – October 21, 1899) (Hardy ministry)	Previously served 19 years in the Mowat ministry.
5		Sir George William Ross	1899–1907 5th Premier (21 October 1899 – 8 February 1905) (Ross ministry)	Previously served as MP 1872–83, and as education minister in the Mowat and Hardy ministries. Appointed Senator 1910
6		George P. Graham	1907	Previously cabinet minister in the Ross ministry Resigned shortly after becoming leader to serve in the federal Laurier ministry. Later served in King ministry and as a Senator. Later a federal MP and Senator
7		Alexander Grant MacKay	1907–1911	Previously cabinet minister in the Ross ministry Later was elected MLA in Alberta and served in Alberta's Stewart ministry
8		Newton Rowell	1911–1917	Broke with party over conscription, resigned to join federal Unionist Borden ministry. Later appointed Chief Justice of Ontario
—		William Proudfoot	1918–1919 (interim)	Interim leader chosen by caucus, faced leadership challenge and lost. Later appointed to Senate
9		Hartley Dewart	1919–1921	First party leader elected by leadership convention. Leader of the Opposition
10		Wellington Hay	1922–1923	Party failed to win either government or 2nd most seats for the first time under Hay's leadership (but 2nd in popular vote), but remain Official Opposition as the governing Conservatives refused to recognize the second-place UFO as the Official Opposition. Later a federal Liberal MP.
—		W.E.N. Sinclair	1923–1930^{[A]}(interim)	Interim leader. Led party in two elections but failed to make significant gains either time. Remained Leader of the Opposition until 1934 as new Liberal leader Mitchell Hepburn didn't have a seat in the legislature.
11		Mitchell Hepburn	1930–1943^{[B]} 11th Premier of (10 July 1934 – 21 October 1942) (Hepburn ministry)	Previously federal MP from 1926 to 1934, remaining in the House of Commons while serving as provincial party leader. Continued as Treasurer in Conant ministry.
—		Gordon Daniel Conant	12th Premier (21 October 1942 – 18 May 1943) (Conant ministry)	Served as Attorney General in the Hepburn ministry and his own ministry. Installed by Hepburn as Premier, did not formally assume party leadership, withdrew from subsequent leadership contest due to health reasons.^{[B]}
12		Harry Nixon	1943–1944 13th Premier (18 May 1943 – 17 August 1943) (Nixon ministry)	Previously sat in the legislature as a United Farmers of Ontario MPP (1919–1923) and a Progressive (1923–1934). As a Liberal-Progressive (1934–1937) he joined the Hepburn cabinet in 1934 before formally becoming a Liberal MPP in 1937. Served as Provincial Secretary and Registrar in the Hepburn ministry. Led the governing Liberals to a third place defeat.
(11)		Mitchell Hepburn	1945 (second tenure)	Initially interim leader, assumed permanent leadership for the second time with imminent election call, lost his own seat in the 1945 election and retired from politics.
13		Farquhar Oliver	1945–1947 (interim) 1947–1950	Previously a United Farmers of Ontario MPP until 1941 when he joined the Hepburn ministry as Minister of Public Works, and served in role again in Nixon ministry. Selected by caucus as interim leader, won permanent leadership in 1947. Following 1948 election defeat, resigned in 1950 but remain parliamentary leader.
14		Walter Thomson	1950–1954	Previously federal MP. Led party in 1951 election but failed to win a seat, party became official opposition despite further lost 6 seats
(13)		Farquhar Oliver	1954–1958 (second tenure)	Parliamentary leader throughout Thomson's leadership, and Leader of the Opposition from 1951 onward. Elected permanent leader again in 1954.
15		John Wintermeyer	1958–1963	First party leader elected without leading on the first ballot. Party gain seats in both 1959 and 1963 elections under his leadership, but he lost his own seat in 1963.
—		Farquhar Oliver	1963–1964 (second interim tenure)	Interim party leader and Leader of the Opposition
16		Andy Thompson	1964–1966	Resigned due to health reason without having led the party in a general election. Later a federal Liberal Senator (1967-1998)
17		Robert Nixon	November 16, 1966 – January 25, 1976 (interim until January 6, 1967)	Elected interim leader by caucus, acclaimed as permanent leader on January 6, 1967. Resigned as leader in 1972 but remained as interim leader, changed mind about retirement, ran to succeed self and won in 1973. Resigned again after leading party to third place in 1975 despite gaining 15 seats.
18		Stuart Smith	January 25, 1976 – December 23, 1981	Leader of the Opposition from 1977 to 1981.
—		Robert Nixon	December 23, 1981 – February 22, 1982 (second interim tenure)	Interim leader for the second time.
19		David Peterson	February 22, 1982 – 1990 20th Premier (26 June 1985 – 1 October 1990) (Peterson ministry)	Led party to winning popular vote but second most seat in 1985 election, form government with an accord with NDP without forming coalition. Led party to majority victory in 1987 election.
—		Robert Nixon	1990–1991 (third interim tenure)	Interim leader for the third time, resigned in order to accept a federal appointment.
—		Murray Elston	1991 (interim)	Previously served in Peterson ministry Interim leader, resigned to seek permanent leadership
—		Jim Bradley	November 19, 1991 – February 9, 1992 (interim)	Interim leader Previously served as environment minister in the Peterson ministry, held portfolio again (and other portfolios) in McGuinty and Wynne ministries
20		Lyn McLeod	February 9, 1992 – December 1, 1996	First female leader and first female Leader of the Opposition. Previously served in Peterson ministry
21		Dalton McGuinty	December 1, 1996 – January 26, 2013 24th Premier (23 October 2003– 11 February 2013 (McGuinty ministry)	Led party to two majority and one minority victories
22		Kathleen Wynne	January 26, 2013 – June 7, 2018 25th Premier (11 February 2013 – 29 June 2018) (Wynne ministry)	Premier of Ontario. First openly LGBT leader, first female leader to win electoral mandate. First female and first LGBT premier of Ontario. Previously served in McGuinty ministry
—		John Fraser	June 14, 2018 — March 7, 2020 (interim)	Interim leader, continued to serve as parliamentary leader following the election of two leaders outside of caucus.
23		Steven Del Duca	March 7, 2020 – August 3, 2022	Previously served in Wynne ministry. Elected leader while not having a seat in the legislature, party led by him came in second in popular vote in 2022, but failed to win his seat
—		John Fraser	August 3, 2022 — December 2, 2023 (second interim tenure)	Interim leader, continued as parliamentary leader since 2018
24		Bonnie Crombie	December 2, 2023 – January 14, 2026	Previously a federal Liberal MP Elected leader while not having a seat in the legislature, party led by her regained official party status in 2025 but failed to win her seat.
—		John Fraser	January 22, 2026 – November 21, 2026 (third interim tenure)	Served as interim leader for the third time following Bonnie Crombie's resignation. Continued as parliamentary leader following the election of Navdeep Bains.
25		Navdeep Bains	November 21, 2026 – present	Previously served as a federal Liberal MP (2004–2011 and 2015–2021) and as Minister of Innovation, Science and Economic Development (2015–2021) in the federal Trudeau ministry.

^{A} Though Sinclair led the party through two elections, he was never formally elected as leader by the Ontario Liberal Association which, due to its state of disorganization, did not organize a leadership convention until 1930.

^{B} Hepburn resigned as Premier in October 1942 after designating Gordon Daniel Conant as his successor, and Conant was sworn in as Premier. The Ontario Liberal Association (particularly supporters of William Lyon Mackenzie King) demanded a leadership convention and one was finally held in May 1943 electing Harry Nixon. Technically, Hepburn did not resign as Liberal leader until the convention.

== Presidents ==
The party president is elected at each annual meeting of the party by delegates elected from electoral district associations and other affiliated associations such as campus clubs. The role of president is to head the party’s executive council, which oversees such things as policy development and proposed party constitutional changes.

The current president is Kathryn McGarry.

Name	Start	End	Notes
Joseph Cruden		April 1973	Presided over the formation of a provincial party separate from the Liberal Party of Canada.
Jeffrey King	April 1973	April 1976	Previously Ottawa Alderman (1970–72)
T. Patrick Reid	April 1976	1977	Elected while MPP for Rainy River
Wally Zimmerman	1977		
Jack Heath			
Jim Evans			
David Deacon	1983	1985	
Don Smith	1985	1987	Co-founder of construction company EllisDon with brother Ellis Smith. Husband of Joan Smith, MPP for London South and later Solicitor General (1987–89)
Brian Ducharme	1987	1988	
Kathy Robinson	1988	1990	
Allan Furlong	1990	1992	MPP for Durham Centre (1987–90)
Richard Mahoney	1992	1995	
Mike Eizenga	1995	1997	Later national president of Liberal Party of Canada (2003–06).
Ross Lamont	1997	1998	
Tim Murphy	1998	November 1999	Previously served as MPP for St. George—St. David (1993–95). Later served as Chief of Staff to Prime Minister Paul Martin (2003–06)
Greg Sorbara	November 1999	February 2004	Previously served as MPP for York North (1985–95) and in the Peterson ministry as Minister of Colleges and Universities and Minister of Skills Development (1985–87), Minister of Labour (1987–89), Minister of Consumer and Commercial Relations (1989–90). Contested party leadership in 1996. Return to the legislature as MPP for Vaughan—King—Aurora (2001–09) while president in a by-election. Served as Minister of Finance (2003–07) in the McGuinty Ministry.
Deb Matthews	February 2004	October 2006	Elected while MPP for London North Centre (2003–18). Resigned upon elevation to cabinet. Served as Minister of Children and Youth Services (2007–2009) and Minister of Health and Long-Term Care (2009–2014) in McGuinty Ministry, and as Deputy Premier of Ontario (2013-2018), Treasury Board President (2014-16) and Minister of Advanced Education and Skills Development (2016–18) in the Wynne ministry.
Gord Phaneuf	Oct 2006	October 2009	
Yasir Naqvi	November 2009	February 2013	Elected while MPP for Ottawa Centre (2007–18). Stepped down upon elevation to cabinet, served as Minister of Labour (2013–14), Minister of Community Safety and Correctional Services (2014-16), and Attorney General (2016–18) in the Wynne ministry. Contested party leadership in 2023.
Derek Teevan	February 2013	March 2014	
Siloni Waraich	April 2014	June 2015	
Vince Borg	June 2015	November 2016	Previously Principal Secretary to Premier David Peterson
Michael Spitale	November 2016	July 2017	
Brian Johns	August 2017	March 5, 2023	
Kathryn McGarry	March 5, 2023	Present	Previously served as MPP for Cambridge (2014–18), and as Minister of Natural Resources and Minister of Transportation in the Wynne ministry. Mayor of Cambridge 2018-22.

== Election results ==
=== Legislative Assembly ===
Election	Leader	Votes	%	Seats	+/−	Position	Status
1867	Edward Blake	77,689	48.8	41 / 82(50%)	▲41	▲2nd	Coalition
1871	Edward Blake	68,366	52.3	43 / 82(52%)	▲2	▲1st	Majority
1875	Oliver Mowat	90,809	47.6	50 / 88(57%)	▲7	1st	Majority
1879	Oliver Mowat	119,148	48.1	57 / 88(65%)	▲7	1st	Majority
1883	Oliver Mowat	125,017	48.2	48 / 88(55%)	▼9	1st	Majority
1886	Oliver Mowat	153,282	48.4	57 / 90(63%)	▲9	1st	Majority
1890	Oliver Mowat	162,118	49.6	53 / 91(58%)	▼4	1st	Majority
1894	Oliver Mowat	153,826	41.0	45 / 94(48%)	▼8	1st	Minority
1898	Arthur S. Hardy	202,332	47.3	51 / 94(54%)	▲6	1st	Majority
1902	George William Ross	206,709	47.5	50 / 98(51%)	▼1	1st	Majority
1905	George William Ross	198,595	44.6	28 / 98(29%)	▼22	▼2nd	Opposition
1908	Alexander Grant MacKay	177,719	39.5	19 / 106(18%)	▼9	2nd	Opposition
1911	Newton Rowell	142,245	38.5	22 / 106(21%)	▲3	2nd	Opposition
1914	Newton Rowell	186,168	37.5	25 / 111(23%)	▲3	2nd	Opposition
1919	Hartley Dewart	301,995	26.9	27 / 111(24%)	▲2	2nd	Opposition
1923	Wellington Hay	203,079	21.8	14 / 111(13%)	▼13	▼3rd	Opposition^{1}
1926	W.E.N. Sinclair	196,813	24.6	15 / 112(13%)	▲1	▲2nd	Opposition
1929	W.E.N. Sinclair	319,487	31.5	13 / 112(12%)	▼2	2nd	Opposition
1934	Mitchell Hepburn	790,419	50.6	69 / 90(77%)	▲51	▲1st	Majority
1937	Mitchell Hepburn	815,275	51.9	65 / 90(72%)	▼4	1st	Majority
1943	Harry Nixon	409,308	31.2	15 / 90(17%)	▼46	▼3rd	Third party
1945	Mitchell Hepburn	520,491	29.5	14 / 90(16%)	▼1	▲2nd	Opposition
1948	Farquhar Oliver	523,477	29.8	14 / 90(16%)	Steady	▼3rd	Third party
1951	Walter Thomson	559,692	31.5	8 / 90(9%)	▼6	▲2nd	Opposition
1955	Farquhar Oliver	585,720	33.3	11 / 98(11%)	▲3	2nd	Opposition
1959	John Wintermeyer	689,148	36.6	22 / 98(22%)	▲10	2nd	Opposition
1963	John Wintermeyer	760,806	35.1	24 / 108(22%)	▲2	2nd	Opposition
1967	Robert Nixon	767,391	31.7	28 / 117(24%)	▲4	2nd	Opposition
1971	Robert Nixon	913,742	27.8	20 / 117(17%)	▼8	2nd	Opposition
1975	Robert Nixon	1,134,681	34.3	36 / 125(29%)	▲16	▼3rd	Third party
1977	Stuart Smith	1,050,706	31.4	34 / 125(27%)	▼2	▲2nd	Opposition
1981	Stuart Smith	1,072,680	33.7	34 / 125(27%)	Steady	2nd	Opposition
1985	David Peterson	1,377,965	37.9	48 / 125(38%)	▲14	2nd	Opposition
1985	David Peterson	1,377,965	37.9	48 / 125(38%)	▲14	2nd	Minority
1987	David Peterson	1,788,214	47.3	95 / 130(73%)	▲47	▲1st	Majority
1990	David Peterson	1,302,134	32.4	36 / 130(28%)	▼59	▼2nd	Opposition
1995	Lyn McLeod	1,291,326	31.1	30 / 130(23%)	▼6	2nd	Opposition
1999	Dalton McGuinty	1,751,472	39.9	35 / 103(34%)	▲5	2nd	Opposition
2003	Dalton McGuinty	2,090,001	46.5	72 / 103(70%)	▲37	▲1st	Majority
2007	Dalton McGuinty	1,867,192	42.2	71 / 107(66%)	▼1	1st	Majority
2011	Dalton McGuinty	1,622,426	37.6	53 / 107(50%)	▼18	1st	Minority
2014	Kathleen Wynne	1,862,907	38.6	58 / 107(54%)	▲5	1st	Majority
2018	Kathleen Wynne	1,124,381	19.6	7 / 124(6%)	▼51	▼3rd	No status
2022	Steven Del Duca	1,116,961	23.8	8 / 124(6%)	▲1	3rd	No status
2025	Bonnie Crombie	1,504,688	29.9	14 / 124(11%)	▲6	3rd	Third party

^{1}The Liberals were recognized as the Official Opposition following the 1923 election by the governing Conservatives, despite the fact that the United Farmers of Ontario had more seats. According to historian Peter Oliver, this was an arbitrary decision without basis in precedent or law. Conservative Premier G. Howard Ferguson used as justification an announcement by UFO general secretary James J. Morrison that the UFO would be withdrawing from party politics, though Oliver argues that this was facetious logic. UFO parliamentary leader Manning Doherty protested the decision, but to no avail. (source: Peter Oliver, G. Howard Ferguson: Ontario Tory, (Toronto: University of Toronto Press, 1977), p. 158.)

== See also ==
- List of Ontario general elections
- List of Ontario Premiers
- List of political parties in Ontario
- Leader of the Opposition (Ontario)
- Liberal Party candidates, 2003 Ontario provincial election
- Liberal Party of Canada
