= 1947 Ontario Liberal Party leadership election =

1947 leadership election of the Ontario Liberal Party

- Date: 16 May 1947
- Convention: King Edward Hotel, Toronto, Ontario
- Resigning leader: Farquhar Oliver (interim)
- Won by: Farquhar Oliver
- Ballots: 1
- Candidates: 5

The 1947 Ontario Liberal Party leadership election was held on 16 May 1947 at the King Edward Hotel in Toronto to choose a permanent leader of the Ontario Liberal Party. Farquhar Oliver, who had served as the party's parliamentary leader since 1945, was elected leader on the first ballot.

Oliver defeated four other candidates: former cabinet minister Colin Campbell, former MPP and Toronto municipal politician Allan Lamport, Alvin P. Cadeau, and W. A. Gunn. Two other candidates, P. M. Dewan and W. A. Moore, withdrew before balloting. Complete vote totals for the defeated candidates were not reported, but Oliver received 492 of 661 votes cast.

== Background ==
The convention followed a turbulent period for the Ontario Liberals. The party had been defeated in the 1943 Ontario general election, ending the Liberal government first led by Mitchell Hepburn and then by Harry Nixon. Hepburn returned as leader for the 1945 Ontario general election, but lost his own seat. After the election, Oliver was chosen by the Liberal caucus as parliamentary leader.

Although the Liberals became the Official Opposition after the 1945 election, Oliver initially held the leadership on an interim or parliamentary basis. The 1947 convention was therefore held to choose a permanent leader before the next provincial election.

== Candidates ==
- Farquhar Oliver – Oliver was the Liberal parliamentary leader and MPP for Grey South. First elected in 1926 as a United Farmers of Ontario member, he later supported the Liberals and formally joined the party during the premiership of Mitchell Hepburn. He had served in provincial cabinet and became the Liberal house leader after Hepburn's defeat in 1945.
- Colin Campbell – Campbell was a mining engineer, military officer and former Liberal MPP. He represented Sault Ste. Marie in the Legislative Assembly and had served in the Hepburn government.
- Allan Lamport – Lamport was a former Liberal MPP for St. David and a Toronto municipal politician. He later served as mayor of Toronto and chairman of the Toronto Transit Commission.
- Alvin P. Cadeau – Cadeau was a Burlington Liberal organizer and businessman. He later served as president of the Ontario Liberal Association.
- W. A. Gunn – Gunn was a Toronto Liberal. He was one of the five candidates whose names remained before the convention when balloting began.

=== Withdrawn candidates ===
- P. M. Dewan – Dewan was the MPP for Oxford from 1934 to 1943. He withdrew before balloting.
- W. A. Moore – Moore withdrew before balloting.

== Results ==
Candidate	Votes	%
Farquhar Oliver	492	74.4
Colin Campbell	n/a	n/a
Allan A. Lamport	n/a	n/a
Alvin P. Cadeau	n/a	n/a
W.A. Gunn	n/a	n/a
Total	661	100.0

- P.M. Dewan and W.A. Moore both withdrew from the race before balloting.

(Note: Complete vote totals were not reported. Oliver received 492 of 661 votes cast)

== Aftermath ==
Oliver led the Liberals into the 1948 Ontario general election. The party increased its caucus but lost Official Opposition status to the Co-operative Commonwealth Federation while the Progressive Conservatives, under Premier Leslie Frost, won another majority government. Oliver resigned the leadership in 1950 and was succeeded by Walter Thomson at the 1950 Ontario Liberal Party leadership election. He later returned as leader at the 1954 Ontario Liberal Party leadership election.
