= 1950 Ontario Liberal Party leadership election =

1950 leadership election of the Ontario Liberal Party

- Date: 10 November 1950
- Convention: Royal York Hotel, Toronto, Ontario
- Resigning leader: Farquhar Oliver
- Won by: Walter Thomson
- Ballots: 3
- Candidates: 8

The 1950 Ontario Liberal Party leadership election was held on November 10, 1950, at the Royal York Hotel in Toronto to choose a new leader of the Ontario Liberal Party. The convention was called after the resignation of Farquhar Oliver, who had led the party since 1947. The election was won by Walter Thomson, a federal Liberal member of Parliament, on the third ballot.

Thomson defeated social reformer Harry Cassidy and John G. Brown on the final ballot. Eight candidates contested the first ballot, making the convention one of the larger Ontario Liberal leadership contests of the period.

== Background ==
The Ontario Liberal Party entered the leadership contest after several years of organizational and electoral difficulty. The party had been defeated in the 1948 Ontario general election, in which Premier Leslie Frost's Progressive Conservatives won a majority government and the Liberals were reduced to third-party status behind the Co-operative Commonwealth Federation.

Farquhar Oliver, who had been elected leader in 1947, resigned in 1950. Oliver remained an influential figure in the party and in the legislature, but the convention selected Walter Thomson, then the federal member of Parliament for Ontario, as his successor.

== Candidates ==
Eight candidates appeared on the first ballot:

- Walter Thomson – Thomson was a lawyer, veteran and federal Liberal member of Parliament for Ontario, elected in the 1949 Canadian federal election. He had previously sought the Ontario Liberal leadership in 1943, placing fourth, and was appointed Ontario solicitor for the Veterans' Land Act before entering federal politics.
- Harry Cassidy – Cassidy was an academic, social reformer and public servant. A specialist in social welfare policy, he held academic appointments in Canada and the United States and became dean of the School of Social Work at the University of Toronto. He had earlier been associated with the League for Social Reconstruction and the Co-operative Commonwealth Federation, but contested the Ontario Liberal leadership in 1950.
- John G. Brown – Brown was a Toronto lawyer and Liberal organizer. He was considered one of the principal contenders at the convention and placed third on the final ballot, behind Thomson and Cassidy.
- Campbell Calder – Calder was the Liberal MPP for London, first elected in the 1948 Ontario general election. He placed fourth on the first ballot and was eliminated after the second ballot.
- Henry Arnott Hicks – Hicks was a Hamilton lawyer and municipal politician. He had run federally as a Liberal candidate in the 1949 Canadian federal election and was serving as a member of the Board of Control for Hamilton at the time of the leadership convention.
- Charles Winnans Cox – Cox was a timber contractor, long-serving mayor of Port Arthur, and Liberal MPP. He had represented Port Arthur from 1934 to 1943 and Fort William from 1948 to 1951, and had served briefly as a minister without portfolio in the government of Mitchell Hepburn.
- Norman Hipel – Hipel was a former Liberal MPP for Waterloo South, former Speaker of the Legislative Assembly of Ontario, and former provincial cabinet minister under Mitchell Hepburn. He had served as minister of labour, minister of lands and forests, and provincial secretary and registrar.
- J. J. Sullivan – Sullivan was a Hamilton lawyer. He entered the race shortly before the convention and was eliminated after placing last on the first ballot.

== Ballot results ==
Delegate support by ballot
Candidate	1st ballot		2nd ballot		3rd ballot	
Name	Votes cast	%	Votes cast	%	Votes cast	%
Walter Thomson	296	40.1	334	44.9	365	52.1
Harry Cassidy	156	21.1	194	26.1	220	31.4
John G. Brown	149	20.2	166	22.3	116	16.5
Campbell Calder	69	9.3	50	6.7	Eliminated	
Henry Arnott Hicks	28	3.8	Withdrew			
Charles Winnans Cox	24	3.3	Withdrew			
Norman Hipel	12	1.6	Withdrew			
J. J. Sullivan	4	0.5	Eliminated			
Total	738	100.0	744	100.0	701	100.0

After the first ballot, J. J. Sullivan was eliminated. Henry Arnott Hicks, Charles Winnans Cox, and Norman Hipel withdrew before the second ballot. Campbell Calder was eliminated after the second ballot, leaving Thomson, Cassidy, and Brown on the third and final ballot.

== Aftermath ==
Thomson led the Liberals into the 1951 Ontario general election, but failed to win a seat in the legislature. The Progressive Conservatives were re-elected with a large majority under Leslie Frost, while the Liberals remained in opposition. Thomson continued as leader until 1954, when he was succeeded by Farquhar Oliver, who returned to the leadership at the 1954 Ontario Liberal Party leadership election.
