= Adam Beck =

Canadian politician (1857–1925)

Sir Adam Beck
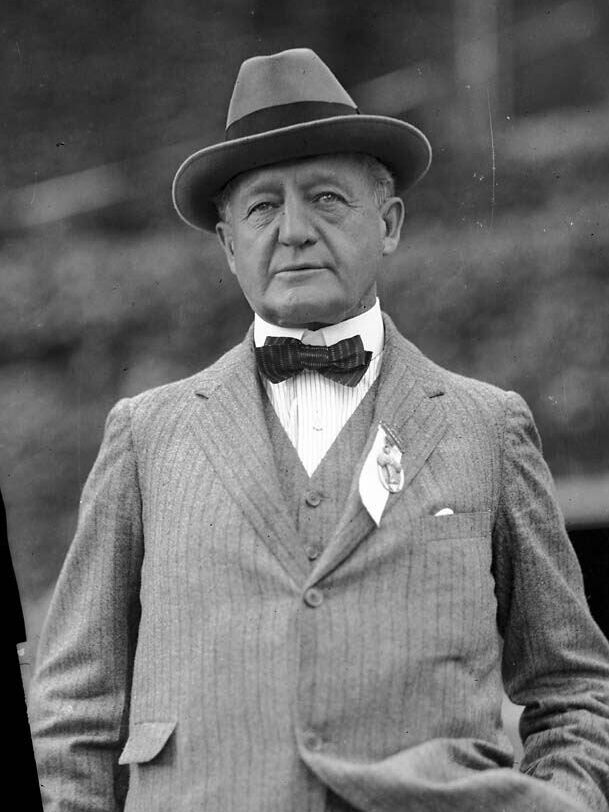

MPP
- In office 1923–1925
- Preceded by: Hugh Allan Stevenson
- Succeeded by: Riding abolished
- In office 1902–1919
- Preceded by: Francis Baxter Leys
- Succeeded by: Hugh Allan Stevenson
- Constituency: London

Chairman of Ontario Hydro
- In office 1906–1925
- Preceded by: none

Personal details
- Born: June 20, 1857 Baden, Canada West
- Died: August 15, 1925 (aged 68) London, Ontario
- Resting place: Hamilton Cemetery
- Party: Conservative
- Spouse: Lilian (Ottaway) Beck
- Relatives: Harry Crerar (brother-in-law)
- Cabinet: Minister Without Portfolio (1905–1914)

Sir Adam Beck (June 20, 1857 – August 15, 1925) was a Canadian politician and hydroelectricity advocate who founded the Hydro-Electric Power Commission of Ontario.

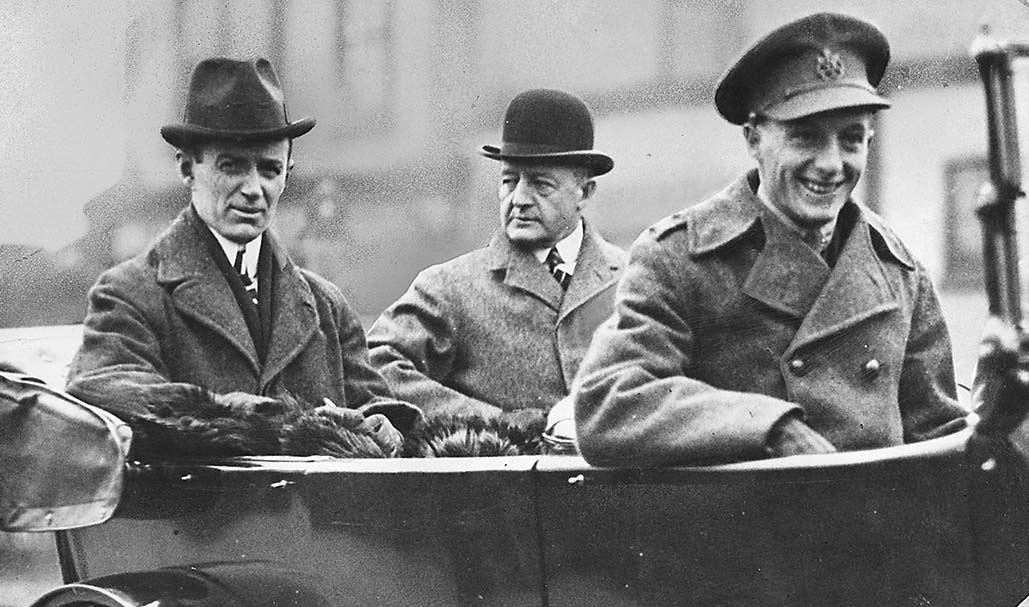
Mayor Thomas Langton Church and Sir Adam Beck (centre)

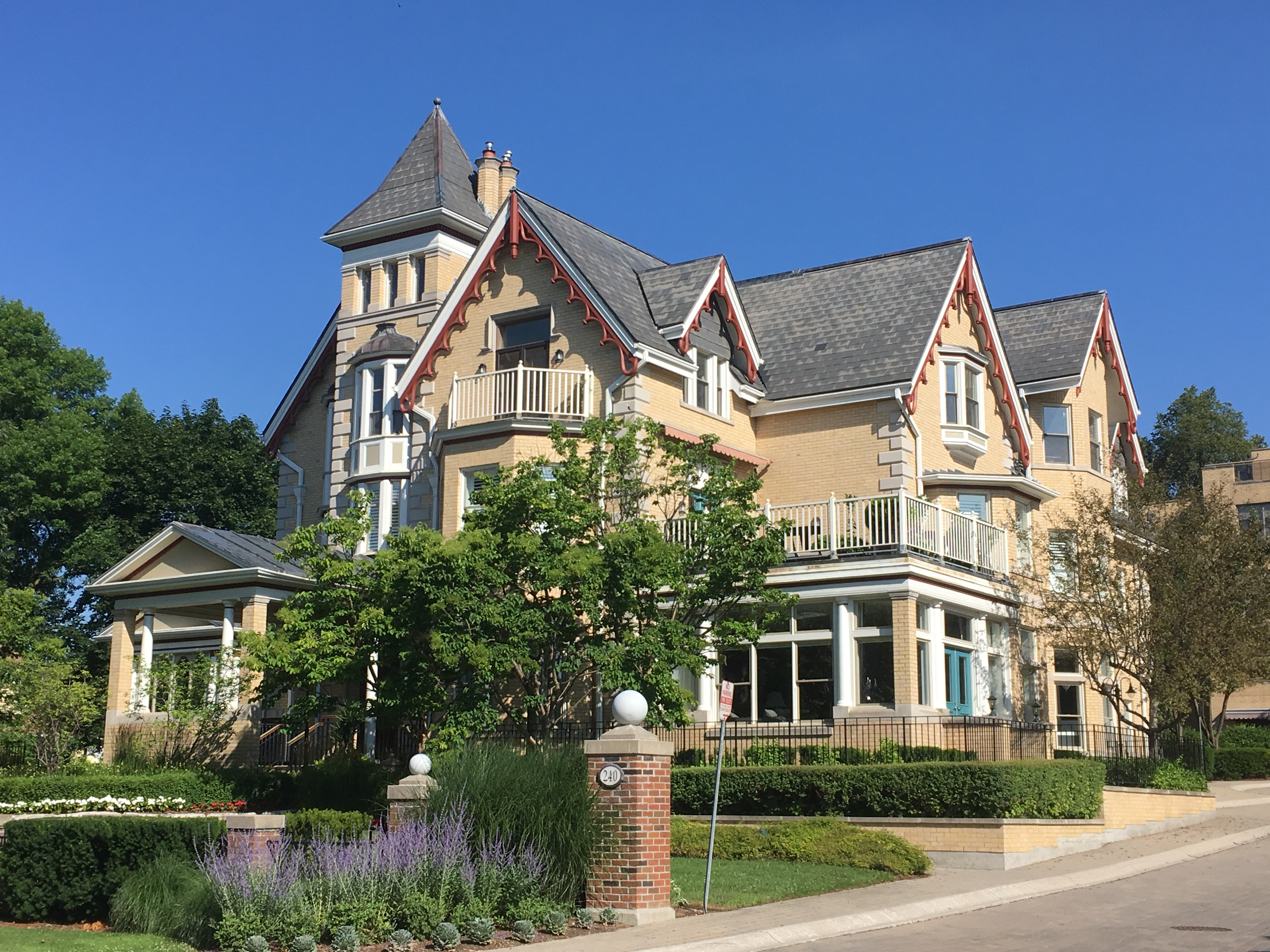
Sir Adam Beck Manor in London

== Biography ==
Beck was born in Baden, Canada West to German immigrants, Jacob Beck and Charlotte Hespeler (sister of William and Jacob Hespeler). He was the great-great-grandson of Count Károly Andrássy de Csíkszentkirály et Krasznahorka (1723–1795). He attended school at the Rockwood Academy in Rockwood, Ontario. As a teenager he worked in his father's foundry, and later established a cigar-box manufacturing company in Galt (now Cambridge, Ontario) with his brother William. In 1885, he moved the company to London, Ontario, where it quickly flourished and established Beck as a wealthy and influential civic leader.

He was also involved in horse breeding and racing, and at a horse show in 1897 he met Lilian Ottaway of Hamilton daughter of Cuthbert Ottaway and Marion Stinson. Lilian's mother, by then Marion Crerar, objected to their 21-year age difference – she was 19 and he 40 – as well as Beck's love of horse racing, which they felt would keep him away from home. Nevertheless, they were married on September 7, 1898. Beck named their London mansion Headley, after Lilian's parents' home in Surrey, England. In addition to horse breeding, for which he won numerous prizes, Beck was also associated with tennis and lawn bowling.

Also in 1898, Beck ran for provincial legislature for the first time, but lost. In 1900, Beck founded the London Health Association, which would later develop into the University and Victoria Hospitals. In 1902, he was elected mayor of London and a few months later was elected to the Ontario legislature as the Conservative member from the London riding. He was re-elected mayor in 1903 and 1904 while simultaneously serving as a member of the provincial legislature (which is no longer permitted). Already a wealthy man, he donated his salary to charity while serving as mayor. In 1905, he was appointed minister without portfolio in the government of premier Sir James P. Whitney.

Beck was an early and prominent advocate of publicly owned electricity grids, opposing the privately owned companies who he felt did not adequately serve the needs of the public. With the slogan "Power at Cost" and in Latin, "dona naturae pro populo sunt" ("the gifts of nature are for the public"), he convinced Premier Whitney to create a board of inquiry on the matter, with him as chairman. The inquiry suggested creating a municipally owned hydroelectric system, funded by the provincial government, and using water from Niagara Falls and other Ontario lakes and rivers. In 1906 Whitney appointed Beck the first chairman of the Hydro-Electric Power Commission. He was knighted by King George V in 1914 for his promotion of electricity and development of transmission lines.

In 1915, he tried to introduce a network of interurban railways, known provincially as radials (long-distance trolleys) in Ontario under public ownership, but this plan had to be put on hold during World War I. In the 1919 post-war election, Beck lost his seat to Hugh Stevenson as the United Farmers of Ontario swept the Conservatives out of power.

Beck continued to push his radial railways proposal after World War I, which pitted him against Premier Ernest Drury, with whom he had an antagonistic relationship. In 1920, Drury created a Royal Commission, chaired by Robert Franklin Sutherland, which concluded that the popularity of automobiles had rendered Beck's proposal obsolete.

During his time in the provincial legislature Beck remained active in London. His daughter Marion, born in 1904, suffered from tuberculosis, but with Beck's wealth and influence she had access to the best doctors and medicine. Realizing that not everyone could afford such care, in 1910 Beck founded a sanitorium, which was very advanced for its time. The Queen Alexandra Sanitorium, named after Alexandra of Denmark, wife of King Edward VII, was officially opened on April 5 of that year by Governor General Earl Grey. It was later renamed the Beck Memorial Sanitorium. Later still it was renamed the Children's Psychiatric Research Institute (CPRI). Today the building houses the London Child and Parent Resource Institute. In 1918 Beck also paid fellow Londoner Guy Lombardo to play at Marion's débutante party.

Lilian Beck died of cancer on October 17, 1921. In 1923 Beck was re-elected to the Ontario legislature, until his own death from anemia in 1925. Former Prime Minister of Canada Arthur Meighen, Ontario premier George Howard Ferguson, and London mayor George Wenige attended his funeral.

The Queenston Chippawa power station (now Sir Adam Beck Hydroelectric Power Stations), which he helped to create, was renamed after him in 1950. Also named for him were Sir Adam Beck Collegiate Institute, a public secondary school in London (closed 1982) which is now home to the Thames Valley District School Board headquarters, an elementary school in Upper Beaches, Toronto, Ontario, and a bilingual elementary school in Etobicoke. Sir Adam Beck Public School was built in his hometown of Baden. Sir Adam Beck Community Park in Baden is also named in his honour. In 1990, Headley, the Becks' mansion at Richmond and Sydenham streets, was demolished by Sifton Properties Ltd. and replaced with a condominium replica dubbed the Sir Adam Beck Manor. In Toronto, there is a statue of Beck (Adam Beck Memorial), sculpted by Emanuel Hahn, on University Avenue at Queen Street West. It was jointly erected by City of Toronto and the Toronto Hydro-Electric Commission in 1934.

== Sources ==
- Ontario Liberals blacking out Adam Beck's energy legacy, by Christina Blizzard, May 16, 2015
- Sir Adam Beck at The Canadian Encyclopedia, accessed September 1, 2019
