= Gordon Pittock =

Canadian politician (1909–1983)

Ontario MPP
- In office 1963–1967
- Preceded by: Gordon Innes
- Succeeded by: Gordon Innes
- Constituency: Oxford

Personal details
- Born: June 25, 1909; Ingersoll, Ontario
- Died: July 1, 1983 (aged 74); Ingersoll, Ontario
- Political party: Progressive Conservative
- Spouse: Louise Mary Giffen
- Children: 2

Gordon William Pittock (June 25, 1909 – 1983) was a Canadian politician, who represented Oxford in the Legislative Assembly of Ontario from 1963 to 1967 as a Progressive Conservative member.

== Background ==
Prior to serving at Queen's Park, Pittock was a charter member of the local land conservation authority, first being named as a Member of the Board of the Upper Thames River Conservation Authority representing his home community of Ingersoll, Ontario in 1947. In 1950, he was appointed the Second Vice-Chair of the Authority. The following year he was named Vice-Chair and, in 1955, he was named the Chair of the Authority, replacing its founding Chair, Dr. Wilson. He served as Chair for ten years and, for much of that time, he also chaired the "Ontario Conservation Authority Chairmen" group. In recognition of his public service, the Pittock Conservation Area, an 820 hectare preserve managed by the Upper Thames River Conservation Authority and situated just north of Woodstock, Ontario, was named after him. The Conservation Area includes the "Gordon Pittock Reservoir" a very popular venue for swimming and fishing. The reservoir was formed by the damming of the Thames River by the Pittock Dam, opened in 1967.

Pittock was married to Louise Martha Giffen (died 1987), in Meaford, Ontario, and had two children. He died in Ingersoll, Ontario in 1983.

== Provincial politics ==
First elected in the general election in 1963, Pittock served as a backbench member of the majority PC government led by Premier John Robarts. In 1965, he was named a Member of the Select Committee that reviewed the provisions of the "Conservation Authorities Act', in recognition of his experience in that field.
