= John Charles Alexander Cameron =

Canadian politician

Member of Parliament for Hastings South
- In office October 1935 – March 1940
- Preceded by: William Ernest Tummon
- Succeeded by: George Henry Stokes

Personal details
- Born: John Charles Alexander Cameron; 29 November 1891 Morrisburg, Ontario
- Died: 24 March 1976 (aged 84) Ottawa, Ontario
- Party: Liberal
- Spouse(s): Katherine Eileen Cook m. 3 July 1924
- Profession: Barrister

John Charles Alexander Cameron (29 November 1891 – 24 March 1976) was a Liberal party member of the House of Commons of Canada. He was born in Morrisburg, Ontario and became a barrister and judge.

Cameron attended public and secondary school at Morrisburg, then attended Queen's University, the law school at the University of Alberta and Osgoode Hall Law School, attaining a Bachelor of Arts degree.

Cameron was first elected to Parliament at the Hastings South riding in the 1935 general election and resigned on 26 March 1940 before the end of the 19th Canadian Parliament. That year, he was appointed a judge at Hastings County and frequently presided in an acting capacity at Ottawa's Exchequer Court. In 1946 he was formally appointed to the Exchequer Court.

Cameron died in Ottawa on 24 March 1976, survived by a wife, two sons and four daughters.
