= Robert Temple =

Robert Temple is the name of:

- Robert K. G. Temple (born 1945), American author
- Anthony Robert Temple (1926–1987), Canadian politician, Member of Parliament from 1963 to 1965
- Robbie Temple (born 1986), English squash player
