= Lee Grills =

Canadian politician

Lee Elgy Grills
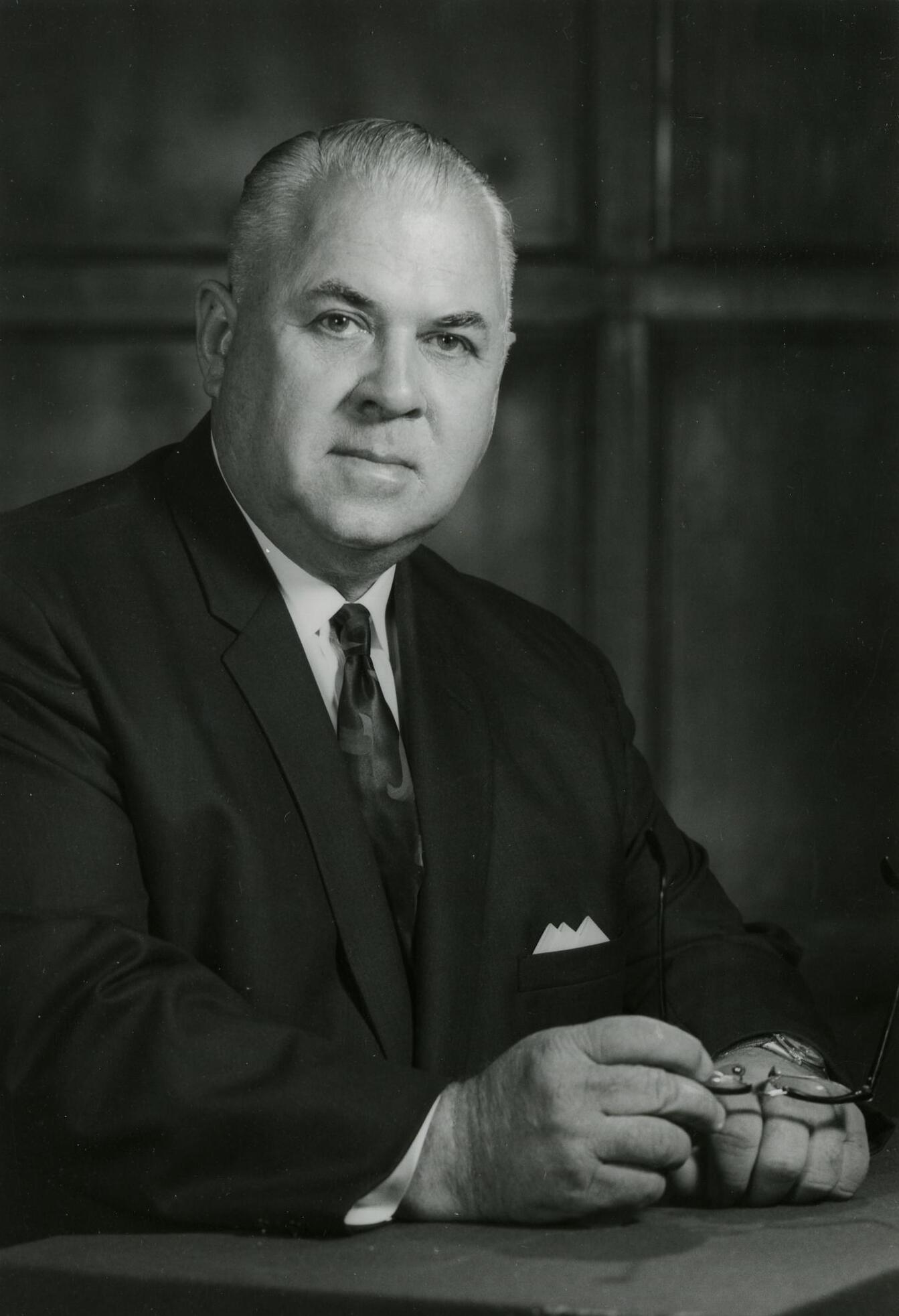

Member of Parliament for Hastings South
- In office June 1957 – April 1963
- In office November 1965 – June 1968

Member of Parliament for Hastings
- In office June 1968 – September 1972

Personal details
- Born: 20 April 1904 Belleville, Ontario
- Died: 3 November 1982 (aged 78)
- Party: Progressive Conservative
- Spouse(s): Bernice Elmy MacDonald m. 18 October 1930
- Profession: Dairy farmer/proprietor

Lee Elgy Grills (20 April 1904 – 3 November 1982) was a Progressive Conservative party member of the House of Commons of Canada. He was a dairy farmer and proprietor by career. He was born in Belleville, Ontario.

Grills was a member of Sidney Township council starting in 1946. He became deputy reeve of that municipality in 1949 and reeve in 1951. In 1952, he was warden of Hastings County, leaving municipal politics later that year.

He first campaigned for a seat in the House of Commons in the 1953 federal election at the Hastings South riding, but was unsuccessful then. He won the seat on his second attempt in the 1957 election, defeating incumbent Frank Follwell. Grills was re-elected in 1958 and 1962, defeated in 1963 by Liberal candidate Robert Temple, then returned to Parliament in the 1965 election. With new riding boundaries, Grills returned to Parliament for the Hastings riding in the 1968 election. After finishing his term in the 28th Canadian Parliament, Grills left federal politics and did not campaign in another election.
