= Francis Baxter Leys =

Canadian politician

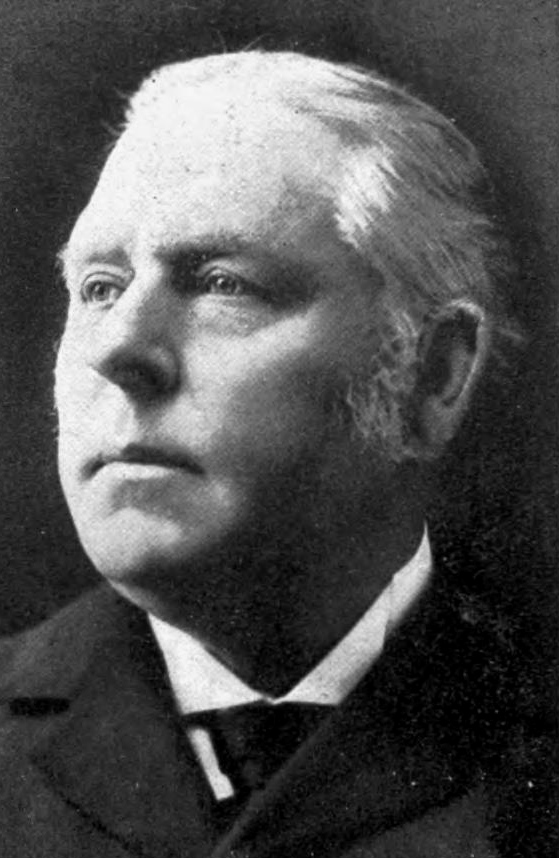

Ontario MPP
- In office 1898–1902
- Preceded by: Thomas Saunders Hobbs
- Succeeded by: Adam Beck
- Constituency: London

Personal details
- Born: March 14, 1839 Pickering Township, Upper Canada
- Died: September 11, 1905 (aged 66) Middlesex County, Ontario
- Party: Liberal
- Spouse: Carrie T. Thompson (m. 1866)
- Relations: John Leys, brother
- Occupation: Businessman

Francis Baxter Leys (March 14, 1839 – September 11, 1905) was a politician in Ontario, Canada. He represented London in the Legislative Assembly of Ontario from 1898 to 1901 and in 1902 as a Liberal.

The son of Francis Leys, a native of Scotland, he was born in Pickering township and was educated at the Toronto Academy. Leys spent four years in British Guiana; when he returned to Canada, he was named paymaster for the Western District. In 1866, he married Carrie T. Thompson. In 1872, Leys became manager of the Dominion Savings and Investment Society. He also served as a school trustee for London South.

Leys was elected in 1898; later that year, charges of numerous violations of election law were brought against him but the charges were dismissed and Leys retained his seat. He resigned his seat in 1901 and was reelected in a by-election held in 1902.

A normal school was built in London (London Normal School) in 1898 thanks to the efforts of Leys and Ontario premier George William Ross.

His brother John also served in the Ontario assembly.
