= William Ernest Tummon =

Canadian politician

Member of Parliament for Hastings South
- In office October 1925 – October 1935
- Preceded by: riding created
- Succeeded by: John Charles Alexander Cameron

Personal details
- Born: William Ernest Tummon; 6 February 1879 Huntingdon Township, Ontario, Canada
- Died: 14 December 1960 (aged 81)
- Party: Conservative
- Spouse(s): Ethel M. Finley m. 12 October 1915
- Profession: Contractor, farmer

William Ernest Tummon (6 February 1879 – 14 December 1960) was a Conservative member of the House of Commons of Canada. He was born in Huntingdon Township, Ontario in Hastings County and became a contractor and farmer.

Tummon attended public and secondary school in Hastings County. He was a councillor at Huntington Township for 14 years and a reeve there for five years.

He was first elected to Parliament at the Hastings South riding in the 1925 general election then re-elected in 1926 and 1930. Tummon was defeated by John Charles Alexander Cameron of the Liberal party in the 1935 election.
