= Norman Hipel =

Canadian politician

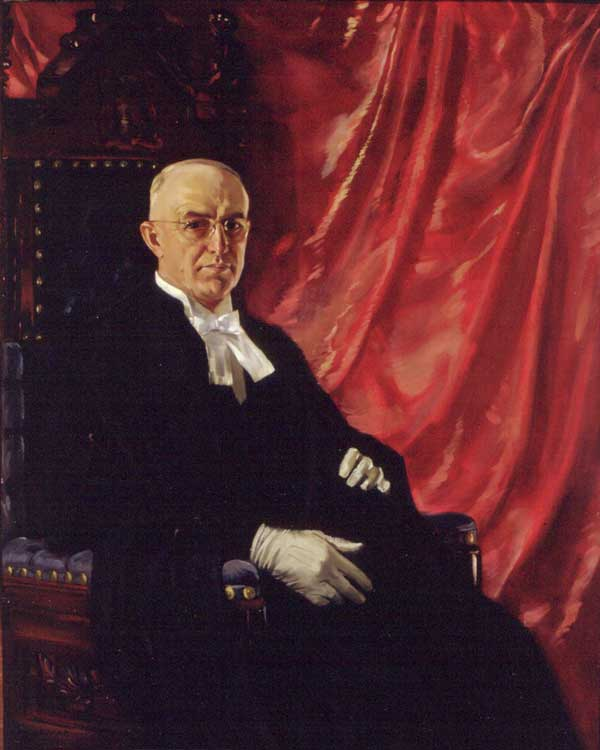
Norman Hipel

Norman Otto Hipel (March 21, 1890 – February 16, 1953) was a Canadian politician, noted for his service as Minister of Labour for Ontario in the cabinet of Mitchell Hepburn. He served as MLA for Waterloo South.

== Personal background and career ==
Kinsmen Memorial Arena in Tillsonburg, with a Hipel Truss roof

Hipel was born in rural Waterloo Township, Ontario near Breslau, Ontario on 21 March 1890, to parents Henry Hipel and Louisa Pelz. He received formal education at the Riverbank School and the Breslau Public School, but he left school early to help support his family, and began work as a store clerk in a Kitchener, Ontario dry goods store. He returned home in 1906 to learn carpentry from his father, and by 1911 had become a building contractor and, in 1913, he moved to Preston, Ontario, and in 1920 started his own construction company, N. O. Hipel Ltd, with ten employees, five horses and a portable sawmill. The company specialized in buildings that required large, uninterrupted floor space. In 1928 his company developed patents on barn and skating rink construction, and built a large number of arenas including the Hespeler Memorial Arena erected in 1947.

Hipel was a member of the Preston Board of Trade, the Ontario Club and was a president and director of the South Waterloo Agricultural Society. He was also a director on the Waterloo County Health Association board, and at the time of his death was also the Preston representative for the South Waterloo Memorial Hospital, now known as the Cambridge Memorial Hospital.

== Politics ==
Hipel began his political career in 1921 when he ran for and was elected to the Preston town council. In 1922 he became the town's reeve, and served as mayor in 1923 and 1924. In 1930 he ran successfully as the Ontario Liberal Party candidate to represent Waterloo South in the Ontario Legislature, and was re-elected in 1934. He served as Speaker of the House from 1935 to 1938, and was chosen to represent Ontario at the coronation of King George VI and Queen Elizabeth in 1937. In 1938 Hipel was appointed Minister of Labour for Ontario in the cabinet of Mitchell Hepburn. As Minister of Labour, he organized the Farm Service Force to help in the harvesting of crops during World War II, and in 1939 he opened the Aircraft Mechanics Training School in Galt, where thousands were trained in radio operation and aircraft maintenance for the war effort. With help from the federal government, he also organized the War Emergency Training Program, providing education in manufacturing skilled required in the production of war materials. Hipel also served as Ontario Minister of Lands and Forests in 1941 and 1943. In this position, Hipel set aside forest lands and established a school at Dorset for the training of forest rangers. He also authorized the first large scale conservation project, known as the Ganaraska watershed area. In 1942 and 1943 he served as Provincial Secretary and Registrar of Ontario, and was elected President of the Ontario Liberal Association in 1947. Hipel ran unsuccessfully in the 1948. He also ran, unsuccessfully, in the 1950 Ontario Liberal Party leadership convention, receiving only 12 votes on the first ballot.

== External links and references ==
- Ontario Legislative Assembly parliamentary history
- City of Cambridge Hall of Fame Norman O. Hipel.
