= Hastings South =

Former federal electoral district in Ontario, Canada

Ontario electoral district

Defunct federal electoral district
- Legislature: House of Commons
- District created: 1924
- District abolished: 1966
- First contested: 1925
- Last contested: 1965

Hastings South was a federal electoral district represented in the House of Commons of Canada from 1925 to 1968. It was located in the province of Ontario. This riding was created in 1924 from parts of Hastings East and Hastings West ridings.

It consisted of the townships of Hungerford, Tyendinaga, Thurlow and Sydney, and including the city of Belleville and towns of Trenton and Deseronto in the County of Hastings.

The electoral district was abolished in 1966 when it was redistributed between Hastings and Prince Edward—Hastings ridings.

== Members of Parliament ==
This riding elected the following members of the House of Commons of Canada:

Parliament	Years	Member	Party
Riding created from Hastings East and Hastings West
15th	1925–1926	William Ernest Tummon	Conservative
16th	1926–1930	William Ernest Tummon	Conservative
17th	1930–1935	William Ernest Tummon	Conservative
18th	1935–1940	John Charles Alexander Cameron	Liberal
19th	1940–1945	George Henry Stokes	National Government
20th	1945–1949	George Henry Stokes	Progressive Conservative
21st	1949–1953	Frank Follwell	Liberal
22nd	1953–1957	Frank Follwell	Liberal
23rd	1957–1958	Lee Grills	Progressive Conservative
24th	1958–1962	Lee Grills	Progressive Conservative
25th	1962–1963	Lee Grills	Progressive Conservative
26th	1963–1965	Anthony Robert Temple	Liberal
27th	1965–1968	Lee Grills	Progressive Conservative
Riding dissolved into Hastings and Prince Edward—Hastings

== Election results ==
1925 Canadian federal election
Party	Candidate	Votes
Conservative	William Ernest Tummon	10,448
Liberal	Charles Edward Hanna	7,837

1926 Canadian federal election
Party	Candidate	Votes
Conservative	William Ernest Tummon	9,704
Liberal	Roscoe Vanderwater	5,912

1930 Canadian federal election
Party	Candidate	Votes
Conservative	William Ernest Tummon	10,340
Liberal	Charles Edward Hanna	8,143

1935 Canadian federal election
Party	Candidate	Votes
Liberal	John Charles Alexander Cameron	9,982
Conservative	William Ernest Tummon	9,572
Reconstruction	Laurie Hamilton Lewis	879

1940 Canadian federal election
Party	Candidate	Votes
National Government	George Henry Stokes	9,001
Liberal	McLean Haig	6,330
Independent Liberal	Harry Raymond Cory	3,348

1945 Canadian federal election
Party	Candidate	Votes
Progressive Conservative	George Henry Stokes	10,546
Liberal	Alexander Mclean Haig	9,420
Co-operative Commonwealth	Douglas Waldron Bews	1,731

1949 Canadian federal election
Party	Candidate	Votes
Liberal	Frank Follwell	13,099
Progressive Conservative	Richard Duke Arnott	10,337
Co-operative Commonwealth	Arthur Clyde Cole	1,780

1953 Canadian federal election
Party	Candidate	Votes
Liberal	Frank Follwell	13,170
Progressive Conservative	Lee Grills	12,121
Co-operative Commonwealth	George Alford Elliott	702

1957 Canadian federal election
Party	Candidate	Votes
Progressive Conservative	Lee Grills	14,798
Liberal	Frank Follwell	12,624
Social Credit	Bazil Alton Kuglin	651

1958 Canadian federal election
Party	Candidate	Votes
Progressive Conservative	Lee Grills	17,849
Liberal	Daniel Clarence McVicker	10,069
Co-operative Commonwealth	Howard Weese	1,058

1962 Canadian federal election
Party	Candidate	Votes
Progressive Conservative	Lee Grills	15,527
Liberal	Anthony Robert Temple	13,873
New Democratic	Leslie W. Digby	1,737

1963 Canadian federal election
Party	Candidate	Votes
Liberal	Anthony Robert Temple	15,505
Progressive Conservative	Lee Grills	14,859
New Democratic	Leslie W. Digby	1,332
Social Credit	G. S. Mallory	265

1965 Canadian federal election
Party	Candidate	Votes
Progressive Conservative	Lee Grills	14,824
Liberal	Anthony Robert Temple	14,569
New Democratic	Thorld M. Hoskin	1,338

== See also ==
- List of Canadian electoral districts
- Historical federal electoral districts of Canada
