= Hastings (federal electoral district) =

Former federal electoral district in Ontario, Canada

Ontario electoral district

Defunct federal electoral district
- Legislature: House of Commons
- District created: 1966
- District abolished: 1976
- First contested: 1968
- Last contested: 1974

Hastings was a federal electoral district represented in the House of Commons of Canada from 1968 to 1979. It was located in the province of Ontario. This riding was created in 1966 from parts of Hastings South and Hastings—Frontenac ridings.

It consisted of the City of Belleville and the Townships of Cashel, Dungannon, Elzevir, Faraday, Grimsthorpe, Hungerford, Huntingdon, Lake, Limerick, Madoc, Marmora, Mayo, Thurlow, Tudor, Tyendinaga and Wollaston in the County of Hastings.

The electoral district was abolished in 1976 when it was redistributed between Prince Edward and Hastings—Frontenac ridings.

== Members of Parliament ==
This riding has elected the following members of Parliament:

Parliament	Years	Member	Party
Riding created from Hastings South and Hastings—Frontenac
28th	1968–1972	Lee Grills	Progressive Conservative
29th	1972–1974	Jack Ellis	Progressive Conservative
30th	1974–1979	Jack Ellis	Progressive Conservative
Riding dissolved into Prince Edward and Hastings—Frontenac

== Election results ==
1968 Canadian federal election
Party	Candidate	Votes
Progressive Conservative	Lee Grills	13,555
Liberal	Robert Temple	10,875
New Democratic	Donald G. Burshaw	3,195

1972 Canadian federal election
Party	Candidate	Votes
Progressive Conservative	Jack Ellis	16,591
Liberal	Frank Follwell	11,391
New Democratic	Elridge G. Brethour	3,378

1974 Canadian federal election
Party	Candidate	Votes
Progressive Conservative	Jack Ellis	14,893
Liberal	Marie Kurchak	12,474
New Democratic	Bob Sanders	3,382
Social Credit	Floyd Hawley	194

== See also ==
- List of Canadian electoral districts
- Historical federal electoral districts of Canada
