= Kimble Sutherland =

Canadian politician

Kim Sutherland

Ontario MPP
- In office 1990–1995
- Preceded by: Charlie Tatham
- Succeeded by: Ernie Hardeman
- Constituency: Oxford

Personal details
- Born: May 15, 1966 (age 60) London, Ontario
- Party: New Democratic Party
- Occupation: Executive Director

Kimble Sutherland (born May 15, 1966) is former politician in Ontario, Canada. He was a New Democratic Party member of the Legislative Assembly of Ontario from 1990 to 1995.

== Background ==
He first became active in politics in 1981, when he joined the local NDP riding executive during a provincial campaign. Sutherland also had a labour background, having served as a shop steward with United Food and Commercial Workers Local 1977 while working at the Zehrs grocery store in Ingersoll.

== Politics ==
Sutherland was elected to the Ontario legislature in the 1990 provincial election in the rural constituency of Oxford defeating both Liberal incumbent Charlie Tatham and a Progressive Conservative candidate by over 2,500 votes.

The NDP under Bob Rae won a majority government in this election, and elected many Member of Provincial Parliament (MPPs) who had little experience in politics and no expectation of winning. Sutherland was only 24 years old at the time, and was studying Political Science at the University of Western Ontario. Sutherland had been elected student council president at UWO prior to his provincial election, and actually served in that position in the 1989–1990 year. During the summer of 1990, his job had been as a vendor at London's Labatt Park, selling hot dogs at baseball games. He agreed to run for the NDP in 1990, after a riding association member broached the possibility with him during a ball game.

Sutherland served as a parliamentary assistant to three cabinet ministers from 1991–1995.

The NDP were defeated in the 1995 provincial election and Sutherland came in second against Progressive Conservative Ernie Hardeman.

== Later career ==
Sutherland served as the Executive Director of the United Way in Oxford and Brant from 1997 to 2007. As of 2016, Sutherland taught history, as well as Civics and Careers, at Central Elgin Collegiate Institute.
