= Harry Cassidy =

Canadian academic (1900–1951)

Harry Cassidy (1900–1951) was a Canadian academic, social reformer, civil servant and, briefly, a politician.

Cassidy was born on January 8, 1900, to parents Herbert Cassidy and Maria Morris Cassidy, transplanted Maritimers who ran a general store. In 1916 Cassidy enlisted underage in the army, spending the next three years in uniform and returning to Canada in the spring of 1919. Harry Cassidy was a pioneer in the field of social work. He was the founding dean of the School of Social Welfare at University of California, Berkeley in the early 1940s before resigning to work for the United Nations Relief and Rehabilitation Administration. He subsequently became dean of the School of Social Work at the University of Toronto. He went on to hold distinguished posts in public service, and in the 1930s and 1940s contributed to national debates about the role of the state in welfare and education.

In the 1930s he was involved with the League for Social Reconstruction and was a founding member of the Co-operative Commonwealth Federation, however, in 1950 he ran for the leadership of the Ontario Liberal Party coming in second in the party leadership convention.

Cassidy conducted studies of welfare services beginning in the 1930s and 1940s and influenced the creation of a Canadian welfare state and improved social services as a means of improving society and alleviating poverty. During the Great Depression he argued that the government of R.B. Bennett should create a broad system of social services such as Unemployment Insurance as a shock absorber against poverty. His research influenced Bennett's decision to try to emulate Franklin Delano Roosevelt's New Deal and some of his ideas were ultimately taken up by the Liberal government of William Lyon Mackenzie King in the 1940s, particularly after Cassidy published his 1943 study Social Security and Reconstruction in Canada. He continued to criticize Canada's social security system as inadequate, writing in 1947 that "The provisions for general assistance are limited, restrictive, mean, and antiquated ... .[T]hey are literally disgraceful and unworthy of a nation of Canada's status".

He also worked for a period in the civil service as deputy minister of welfare in British Columbia.

Cassidy's son, Michael Cassidy, was a New Democratic Party politician and also leader of the Ontario New Democratic Party in the 1980s and 1990s.

After Cassidy joined the army he began to keep a diary, perhaps inspired by recognition of a change in his social role and its familiar routines. These diaries have been published by the Champlain Society.
