= Jack Ellis (politician) =

Canadian politician

John Raymond Ellis MP
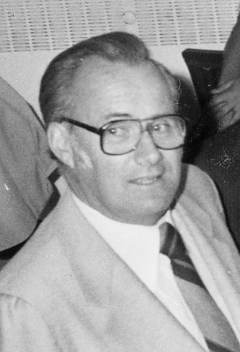

Member of Parliament for Prince Edward—Hastings
- In office 1972–1988
- Preceded by: George Hees
- Succeeded by: Lyle Vanclief

Personal details
- Born: October 31, 1929 Campbellford, Ontario
- Died: December 1, 1994 (aged 65)
- Party: Progressive Conservative
- Profession: Entrepreneur, manager

John Raymond (Jack) Ellis (31 October 1929 – 1 December 1994) was a Canadian politician. He served a term as Mayor of Belleville, Ontario from 1964 to 1967. As a Progressive Conservative, he served five terms as a Member of Parliament in the House of Commons representing the Ontario electoral districts of Hastings and Prince Edward—Hastings. He was first elected in the 1972 federal election, and was re-elected in the 1974, 1979, 1980, and 1984 elections.
