= Harry Craig Parrott =

Canadian politician (1925–2019)

Harry Parrott

Ontario MPP
- In office 1971–1981
- Preceded by: Gordon Innes
- Succeeded by: Dick Treleaven
- Constituency: Oxford

Personal details
- Born: November 30, 1925 Mitchell, Ontario, Canada
- Died: July 2, 2019 (aged 93) Clinton, Ontario, Canada
- Party: Progressive Conservative
- Occupation: Dentist

Harry Craig Parrott (November 30, 1925 – July 2, 2019) was a politician from Ontario, Canada. He was a Progressive Conservative member of the Legislative Assembly of Ontario from 1971 to 1981 who represented the riding Oxford. He served as a cabinet minister in the government of Bill Davis.

== Background ==
He was born in Mitchell, Ontario in 1925 and was educated in Mitchell and at the University of Toronto, receiving a D.D.S. in 1947. He was president of the Red Cross for Oxford County. He died at a hospital in Clinton, Ontario in 2019, aged 93.

== Politics ==
Parrott was a member of the Woodstock board of education, served on city council for Woodstock.

In 1971 he ran as the Progressive Conservative candidate in the riding of Oxford. He defeated Liberal incumbent Gordon Innes by 3,024 votes. He was re-elected in 1975 and 1977.

In October 1975 he was appointed as Minister of Colleges and Universities. In August 1978, he was appointed as Minister of Environment.

=== Cabinet positions ===
Davis ministry, Province of Ontario (1971–1985)
Cabinet posts (2)
Predecessor	Office	Successor
George McCague	Minister of Environment; 1978–1981	Keith Norton
James Auld	Minister of Colleges and Universities; 1975–1978	Bette Stephenson
