= Charlie Tatham =

Canadian politician

Ontario MPP
- In office 1987–1990
- Preceded by: Dick Treleaven
- Succeeded by: Kimble Sutherland
- Constituency: Oxford

Personal details
- Born: November 8, 1925 Woodstock, Ontario
- Died: February 3, 2016 (aged 90) Powell River, British Columbia
- Party: Liberal
- Occupation: Business executive

Military service
- Years of service: 1940-1945
- Unit: Oxford Rifles Reserve, 1940-1943; Royal Canadian Air Force, 1943-1945

Charles Murray Tatham (November 8, 1925 - February 3, 2016) was a former politician in Ontario, Canada. He served in the Legislative Assembly of Ontario as a Liberal from 1987 to 1990.

== Background ==
Tatham is a former shareholder and vice-president of Wood-Gen Supply Ltd. He served in the Oxford Rifles Reserve from 1940 to 1943, and was a Royal Canadian Air Force officer from 1943 to 1945.

== Politics ==
Tatham was an alderman in the city of Woodstock in 1956, served as mayor of the city from 1957 to 1958, and was an alderman again from 1979 to 1987.

He ran for the House of Commons of Canada as a candidate of the Liberal Party of Canada in the elections of 1968, 1972 and 1974, in the riding of Oxford. He was defeated on all three occasions. The closest he came to winning was in 1974, when he lost to Progressive Conservative Bruce Halliday by only 1,428 votes.

Tatham was elected to the Ontario legislature for the riding of Oxford in the 1987 provincial election, defeating incumbent Progressive Conservative Dick Treleaven by 2,874 votes. He served as a backbench supporter of David Peterson's government for the next three years.

The Liberals were defeated in the 1990 provincial election, and Tatham was reduced to a third-place finish in Oxford, losing to Kimble Sutherland of the New Democratic Party.

== After politics ==
Tatham was chair of the Collingwood Airport Services Board. The Charlie Tatham Peace Park is named in his honour in Woodstock, Ontario.
