= Patrick Michael Dewan =

Canadian politician (1890–1988)

Patrick Dewan

Ontario MPP
- In office 1934–1943
- Preceded by: New riding
- Succeeded by: Thomas Dent
- Constituency: Oxford

Personal details
- Born: December 23, 1890 Osgoode Township, Ontario
- Died: July 29, 1988 (aged 97)
- Party: Liberal
- Spouse: Margaret Olive Tierney (m. 1921)

Patrick Michael Dewan (December 23, 1890 – July 29, 1988) was a Canadian farmer and politician from Ontario. He represented the Oxford in the Legislative Assembly of Ontario from 1934 to 1943 as a Liberal member.

He was born in Osgoode Township, Ontario (now Ottawa, Ontario), the son of John Joseph Dewan, and was educated at Willis Business College in Ottawa, the University of Ottawa, St. Francis Xavier University in Nova Scotia and the Ontario Agricultural College in Guelph. In 1921, Dewan married Margaret Olive Tierney. He served as alderman for Woodstock and was also secretary-treasurer of the Woodstock Agricultural Society. Dewan served as Minister of Agriculture in the provincial cabinet from 1937 to 1943. He ran in the 1947 Ontario Liberal leadership convention but withdrew before balloting began.
