= John G. Brown =

Canadian politician (1900–1958)

John George Brown

Member of the Legislative Assembly of Ontario for Waterloo North
- In office June 7, 1948 – October 6, 1951
- Preceded by: Joseph Ignatino Meinzinger
- Succeeded by: Stanley Francis Leavine

Personal details
- Born: May 8, 1900 Paisley, Ontario
- Died: November 11, 1958 (aged 58) Kitchener-Waterloo, Ontario
- Party: Liberal

John George Brown (May 8, 1900 – November 11, 1958) was an Ontario politician. He was elected to the Ontario legislature as the Ontario Liberal Party Member of Provincial Parliament for Waterloo North in the 1948 provincial election.

Brown ran for his party's leadership in the 1950 Liberal leadership convention. He placed third in a field of eight candidates and remained until the third and final ballot.

He only served in the legislature for a single term, until the 1951 provincial election. He died suddenly in a hospital in 1958.
