= Archibald Stuart Duncan =

Canadian politician

Ontario MPP
- In office 1934–1943
- Preceded by: Riding re-established
- Succeeded by: William Gourlay Webster
- Constituency: London

Personal details
- Born: February 5, 1887 Dutton, Ontario, Canada
- Died: May 24, 1955 (aged 68) London, Ontario, Canada
- Party: Liberal
- Occupation: Doctor

Archibald Stuart Duncan (February 5, 1887 – May 24, 1955) was a doctor and politician in Ontario, Canada. He represented London in the Legislative Assembly of Ontario from 1934 to 1943 as a Liberal.

The son of George Duncan and Christina Campbell, he was born in Dutton and was educated in London and at the University of Western Ontario.
