= Ernie Hardeman =

Canadian politician

The Honourable Ernie Hardeman ECO MPP
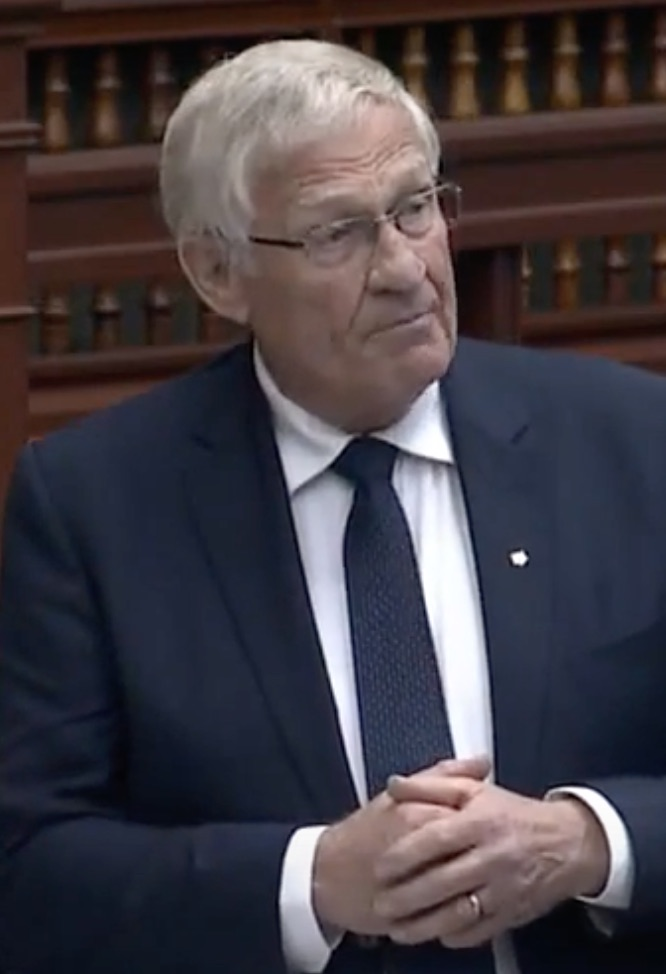
- Hardeman in 2018

Minister of Agriculture, Food and Rural Affairs
- In office June 29, 2018 – June 18, 2021
- Premier: Doug Ford
- Preceded by: Jeff Leal
- Succeeded by: Lisa Thompson

Dean of the Legislative Assembly of Ontario
- Incumbent
- Assumed office February 28, 2025
- Preceded by: Ted Arnott

Member of the Ontario Provincial Parliament for Oxford
- Incumbent
- Assumed office June 8, 1995
- Preceded by: Kim Sutherland

Personal details
- Born: December 4, 1947 (age 78)
- Party: Progressive Conservative Party
- Relations: John Vanthof (nephew)
- Occupation: Business owner

Ernie Hardeman ECO MPP (born December 4, 1947) is a Canadian politician who served as Ontario Minister of Agriculture, Food and Rural Affairs from 2018 to 2021 in the Doug Ford government and as Minister of Agriculture and Food from 1999 to 2001 in the Mike Harris government. He represents the rural riding of Oxford for the Progressive Conservative Party. Upon his re-election in 2025, with the retirement of Ted Arnott, he became the longest serving member of Ontario Provincial Parliament. He is currently the only sitting Progressive Conservative MPP to have served as a Progressive Conservative MPP when Mike Harris was premier.

== Background ==
Hardeman was the owner and operator of Hardeman Feed Limited, established in Salford, Ontario, from 1966 to 1995. Hardeman's nephew, John Vanthof, is a current sitting MPP for the New Democratic Party and behind his uncle in the legislature.

== Politics ==
He served as mayor of the Township of Southwest Oxford from 1988 to 1994. He was chair of the Wardens' Association of Ontario in 1990–91, and served as a board member on the Association of Municipalities of Ontario.

Hardeman was elected to the Ontario legislature in the provincial election of 1995, defeating incumbent New Democrat Kimble Sutherland by about 8000 votes. The Progressive Conservatives under Mike Harris won the election, and Hardeman was a government backbench supporter for the next four years. In 1996, he was commissioned by the government to conduct a survey on the possible amalgamation of Hamilton, Ontario into a united municipality.

He was easily re-elected in the 1999 provincial election. He was appointed to cabinet by Mike Harris as Minister of Agriculture, Food and Rural Affairs on June 17, 1999. As Minister, he replaced agricultural offices with the Agricultural Information Contact Centre. He was removed from cabinet on February 7, 2001. On February 25, 2003, he returned to cabinet under Ernie Eves in the new position of Associate Minister of Municipal Affairs and Housing, with Responsibility for Rural Affairs.

Hardeman was re-elected in the 2003 election. He supported Jim Flaherty's unsuccessful bid for the Progressive Conservative party's leadership in 2004. On June 13, 2005, Hardeman's private members bill, Farm Implements Amendment Act, received third reading and royal assent.

In 2007 Hardeman was re-elected for a fourth consecutive term. He served as Deputy House Leader and was then promoted to Chair of the Standing Committee on Government Agencies. He is also the PC critic for Agriculture, Food and Rural Affairs.

On June 16, 2008, Hardeman introduced a private member's bill which allows farmers to post seasonal, directional signage along provincial highways to advertise their Ontario grown produce and direct consumers to the farm. The bill was supported by many agricultural groups and unanimously passed first, second and third reading. On December 10, 2008, Signage to Promote Ontario Produced Agricultural Products Act received royal assent and became law.

=== Electoral record ===
2025 Ontario general election: Oxford
| Party | Candidate | Votes | % | ±% | Expenditures |
|---|---|---|---|---|---|
| Progressive Conservative | Ernie Hardeman | 27,061 | 55.3 | +5.3 | |
| Liberal | Bernia Martin | 11,348 | 23.2 | +10.9 | |
| New Democratic | Khadijah Haliru | 5,374 | 11.0 | –10.4 | |
| Green | Colton Kaufman | 2,182 | 4.5 | –0.2 | |
| Ontario Party | Grace Harper | 1,414 | 2.9 | –5.2 | |
| New Blue | Peter Beimers | 1,317 | 2.7 | –0.7 | |
| Libertarian | Henryk Szymczyszyn | 276 | 0.6 | N/A | |
| Total valid votes/expense limit | | | | | |
| Total rejected, unmarked, and declined ballots | | | | | |
| Turnout | | | 49.2 | +2.7 | |
| Eligible voters | | 99,543 | | | |
| Progressive Conservative hold | | Swing | | –2.8 | |
Source: Elections Ontario

2022 Ontario general election: Oxford
| Party | Candidate | Votes | % | ±% | Expenditures |
|---|---|---|---|---|---|
| Progressive Conservative | Ernie Hardeman | 22,166 | 50.01 | −5.72 | $47,286 |
| New Democratic | Lindsay Wilson | 9,504 | 21.44 | −8.98 | $37,217 |
| Liberal | Mary Holmes | 5,457 | 12.31 | +5.39 | $23,863 |
| Ontario Party | Karl Toews | 3,579 | 8.08 | +7.22 | $39,947 |
| Green | Cheryle Rose Baker | 2,097 | 4.73 | +0.42 | $570 |
| New Blue | Connie Oldenburger | 1,518 | 3.43 | | $7,700 |
| Total valid votes/expense limit | | 44,321 | 99.46 | +0.91 | $134,298 |
| Total rejected, unmarked, and declined ballots | | 240 | 0.54 | -0.91 | |
| Turnout | | 44,561 | 46.45 | -12.8 | |
| Eligible voters | | 94,368 | | | |
| Progressive Conservative hold | | Swing | | +1.63 | |
Source(s): "Summary of Valid Votes Cast for Each Candidate" (PDF). Elections Ontario. 2022. Archived from the original on May 18, 2023.; "Statistical Summary by Electoral District" (PDF). Elections Ontario. 2022. Archived from the original on May 21, 2023.

2018 Ontario general election: Oxford
| Party | Candidate | Votes | % | ±% |
|---|---|---|---|---|
| Progressive Conservative | Ernie Hardeman | 29,152 | 55.73 | +9.49 |
| New Democratic | Tara King | 15,917 | 30.43 | +4.66 |
| Liberal | James Howard | 3,620 | 6.92 | -14.41 |
| Green | Albert De Jong | 2,254 | 4.31 | -0.53 |
| Ontario Party | Robert Van Ryswyck | 447 | 0.85 | |
| Libertarian | Chris Swift | 370 | 0.71 | -0.18 |
| Independent | David Sikal | 335 | 0.64 | |
| Freedom | Tim Hodges | 216 | 0.41 | -0.53 |
| Total valid votes | | 52,311 | 100.0 | |
| Total rejected, unmarked and declined ballots | | | | |
| Turnout | | | 60.20 | |
| Eligible voters | | 86,877 | | |
| Progressive Conservative hold | | Swing | | +2.42 |
Source: Elections Ontario

2014 Ontario general election
| Party | Candidate | Votes | % | ±% |
|---|---|---|---|---|
| Progressive Conservative | Ernie Hardeman | 18,958 | 46.24 | -8.63 |
| New Democratic | Bryan Smith | 10,573 | 25.79 | +10.14 |
| Liberal | Dan Moulton | 8,736 | 21.31 | -3.66 |
| Green | Mike Farlow | 1,985 | 4.84 | +1.29 |
| Freedom | Tim Hodges | 384 | 0.94 | |
| Libertarian | Devin Wright | 365 | 0.89 | |
| Total valid votes | | 41001 | 100.00 | |
| Progressive Conservative hold | | Swing | | -9.39 |
Source: Elections Ontario

2011 Ontario general election
| Party | Candidate | Votes | % | ±% |
|---|---|---|---|---|
| Progressive Conservative | Ernie Hardeman | 20,658 | 54.87 | +7.60 |
| Liberal | David Hilderley | 9,410 | 24.99 | -4.34 |
| New Democratic | Dorothy Marie Eisen | 5,885 | 15.63 | +4.28 |
| Green | Catherine Stewart-Mott | 1,336 | 3.55 | -5.26 |
| Family Coalition | Leonard Vanderhoeven | 359 | 0.95 | -0.60 |
| Total valid votes | | 37,648 | 100.0 | |
| Total rejected, unmarked and declined ballots | | 123 | 0.33 | |
| Turnout | | 37,771 | 49.18 | |
| Eligible voters | | 76,804 | | |
| Progressive Conservative hold | | Swing | | +5.97 |
Source: Elections Ontario

2007 Ontario general election
| Party | Candidate | Votes | % | ±% |
|---|---|---|---|---|
| Progressive Conservative | Ernie Hardeman | 18,445 | 47.27 | +3.21 |
| Liberal | Brian Jackson | 11,455 | 29.36 | -8.77 |
| New Democratic | Mike Comeau | 4,421 | 11.33 | -1.21 |
| Green | Tom Mayberry | 3,441 | 8.82 | +6.83 |
| Independent | Jim Bender | 659 | 1.69 | |
| Family Coalition | Leonard Vanderhoeven | 601 | 1.54 | -0.08 |
| Total valid votes | | 39,022 | 100.0 | |

2003 Ontario general election
| Party | Candidate | Votes | % | ±% |
|---|---|---|---|---|
| Progressive Conservative | Ernie Hardeman | 18,656 | 44.06 | -9.19 |
| Liberal | Brian Brown | 16,135 | 38.10 | +2.57 |
| New Democratic | Shawn Rouse | 5,318 | 12.56 | +5.35 |
| Green | Tom Mayberry | 838 | 1.98 | |
| Family Coalition | Andre De Decker | 689 | 1.63 | -0.42 |
| Freedom | Paul Blair | 404 | 0.95 | +0.22 |
| Libertarian | Kaye Sargent | 306 | 0.72 | -0.03 |
| Total valid votes | | 42,346 | 100.0 | |

1999 Ontario general election
| Party | Candidate | Votes | % |
|---|---|---|---|
| Progressive Conservative | Ernie Hardeman | 22,726 | 53.25 |
| Liberal | Brian Brown | 15,160 | 35.53 |
| New Democratic | Martin Donlevy | 3,077 | 7.21 |
| Family Coalition | Andre De Decker | 875 | 2.05 |
| Libertarian | Kaye Sargent | 321 | 0.75 |
| Freedom | Paul Blair | 312 | 0.73 |
| Natural Law | Jim Morris | 203 | 0.48 |
| Total valid votes | | 42,674 | 100.0 |

=== Cabinet positions ===
Ford ministry, Province of Ontario (2018–present)
Cabinet post (1)
| Predecessor | Office | Successor |
|---|---|---|
| Jeff Leal | Minister of Agriculture, Food and Rural Affairs; June 29, 2018–2021 | Lisa Thompson |
Eves ministry, Province of Ontario (2002–2003)
Cabinet post (1)
| Predecessor | Office | Successor |
| Brian Coburn | Associate Minister of Municipal Affairs and Housing; 2003 (February–October); Also Responsible for Rural Affairs | Position eliminated |
Harris ministry, Province of Ontario (1995–2002)
Cabinet post (1)
| Predecessor | Office | Successor |
| Noble Villeneuve | Minister of Agriculture and Food; 1999-2001 Fired the first time from this position. | Brian Coburn |
