= Thomas Saunders Hobbs =

Canadian politician

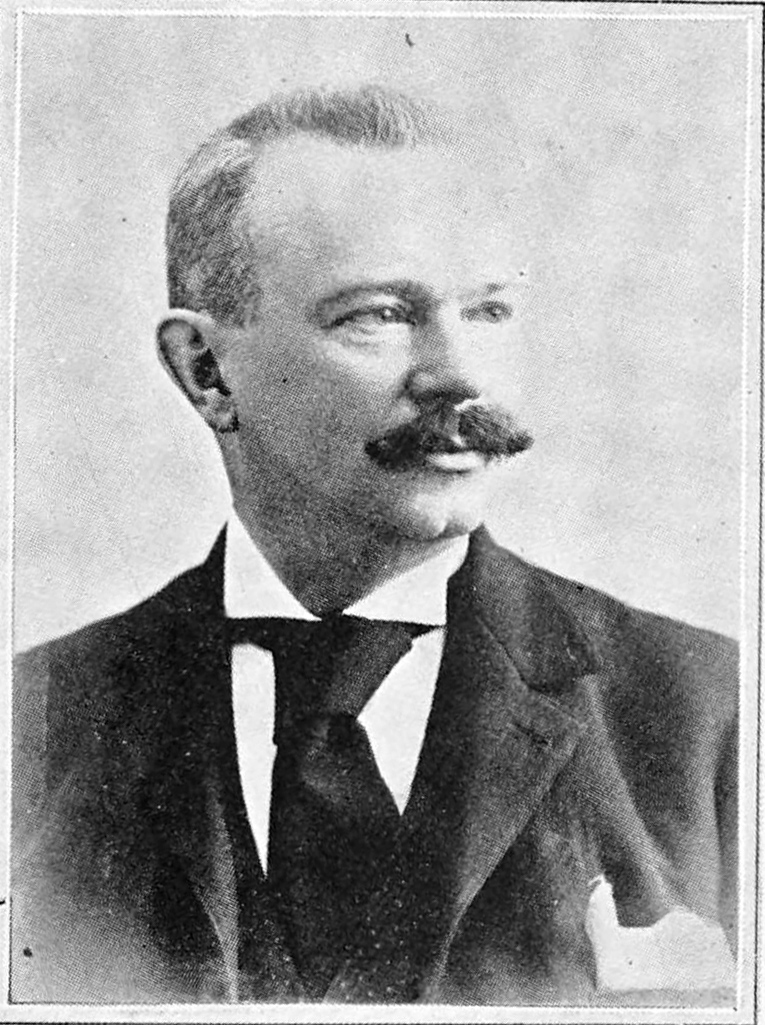

Ontario MPP
- In office 1894–1898
- Preceded by: William Ralph Meredith
- Succeeded by: Francis Baxter Leys
- Constituency: London

Personal details
- Born: April 15, 1856 Langtree, Devonshire, England
- Died: September 30, 1927 (aged 71) London, Ontario, Canada
- Party: Liberal
- Occupation: Businessman

Thomas Saunders Hobbs (15 April 1856 – 30 September 1927) was an English-born Ontario merchant and political figure. He represented London in the Legislative Assembly of Ontario from 1894 to 1898 as a Liberal member.

He was born in Devonshire in 1856, the son of Thomas S. Hobbs, was educated at the Methodist college in Shebbear and came to London, Ontario with his family. Hobbs was a manufacturer, owned a hardware store and was vice-president of the London Board of Trade.

Hobbs ran for provincial office. He was defeated by William Ralph Meredith in 1894 but elected in a by-election held later that year after Meredith was appointed judge. Hobbs was also a director of the Trusts and Guarantee Company and served as paymaster in the local militia. He died in 1927.
