= Gordon Innes (politician) =

Canadian politician

Gord Innes

Ontario MPP
- In office 1967–1971
- Preceded by: Gordon Pittock
- Succeeded by: Harry Parrott
- In office 1955–1963
- Preceded by: Thomas Dent
- Succeeded by: Gordon Pittock
- Constituency: Oxford

Personal details
- Born: February 6, 1917
- Died: June 30, 1981 (aged 64); Woodstock, Ontario
- Political party: Liberal
- Spouse: Vera
- Children: 4
- Occupation: Dairy farmer

Gordon William Innes (February 6, 1917 – June 30, 1981) was a politician in Ontario, Canada. He was a Liberal member of the Legislative Assembly of Ontario from 1955 to 1963 and then again from 1967 to 1971. He represented the riding of Oxford.

== Background ==
Prior to his election, Innes was a holstein cattle breeder and judge in Oxford County. In 1972, Innes and his Cityview Farm operation was recognized as a "Master Breeder" by the Holstein Canada.

Innes died in 1981 and is buried in the Oxford Memorial Park, just outside Woodstock, Ontario.

== Politics ==
In 1955, Innes ran as the Liberal candidate in the riding of Oxford. He defeated Progressive Conservative incumbent Thomas Dent by 555 votes. He was re-elected in the general election in 1959. In 1963, he was defeated by the PC candidate Gordon Pittock but turned around and defeated Pittock during the subsequent general election in 1967. In 1971, he was defeated by PC candidate Harry Parrott, and he retired from public life.
