= Thomas Dent (Ontario politician) =

Canadian politician (1891–1977)

Ontario MPP
- In office 1943–1955
- Preceded by: Patrick Dewan
- Succeeded by: Gord Innes
- Constituency: Oxford

Personal details
- Born: April 22, 1891 Woodstock, Ontario
- Died: July 18, 1977 (aged 86) Woodstock, Ontario
- Party: Conservative
- Spouse: Susan M. Griffin (m. 1920)
- Occupation: Farmer

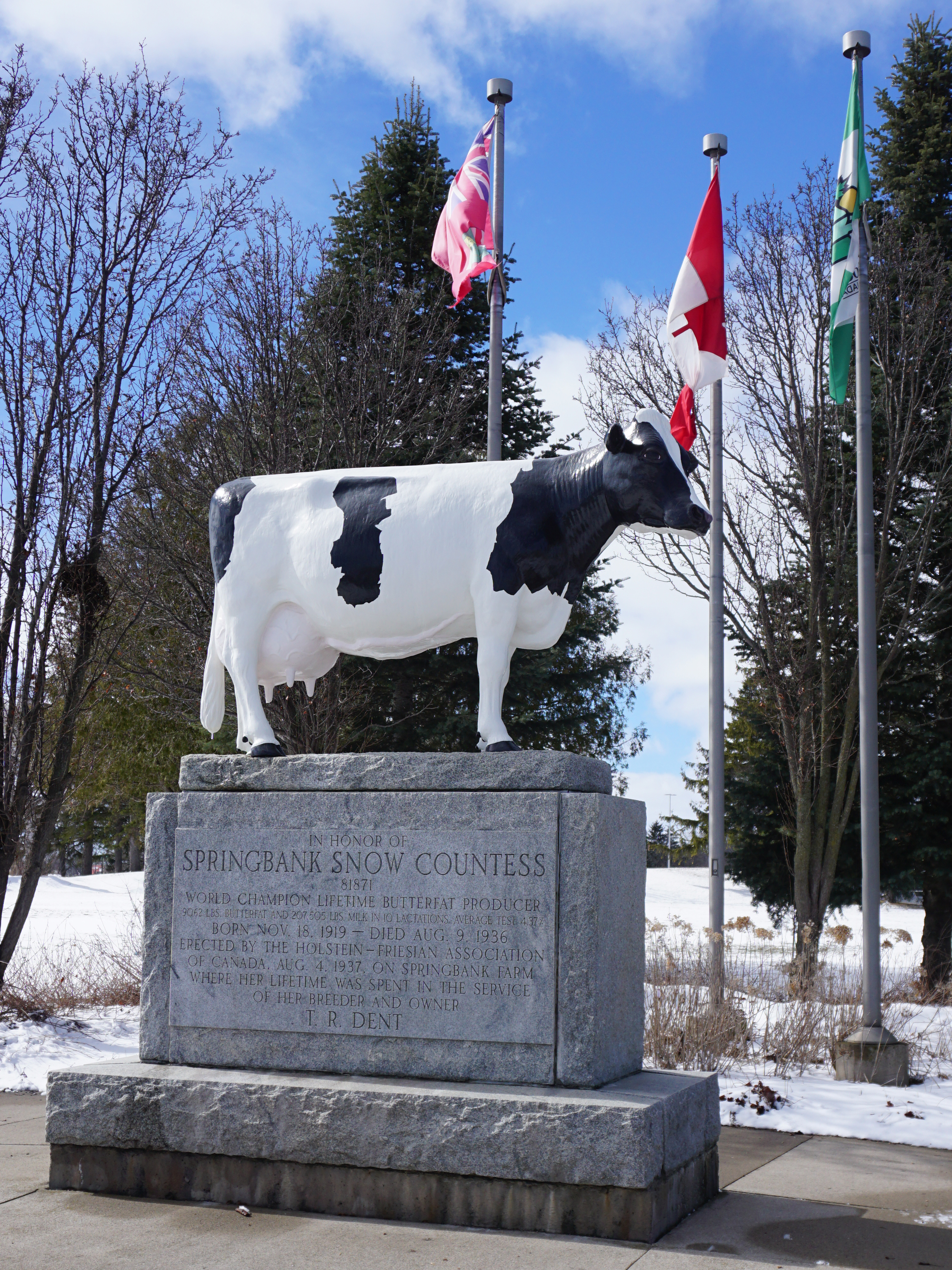
Monument to Springbank Snow Countess

Thomas Roy Dent (April 22, 1891 – July 18, 1977) was a farmer and politician in Ontario, Canada. He represented Oxford in the Legislative Assembly of Ontario from 1943 to 1955 as a Conservative.

The son of Thomas Harrison Dent and Elizabeth Paddon, he was born in Woodstock and was educated there and at the Ontario Agricultural College. In 1920, Dent married Susan M. Griffin. He was a judge and breeder of Holstein Friesian cattle and was president of the Holstein Friesian Association. He owned and bred Springbank Snow Countess, who was the world’s record lifetime producer of butterfat.

Dent ran unsuccessfully for a seat in the Ontario assembly in 1937 before being elected in 1943. He died in Woodstock at the age of 86.
