= William Gourlay Webster =

Canadian politician

Ontario MPP
- In office 1943–1948
- Preceded by: Archibald Stuart Duncan
- Succeeded by: Campbell Calder
- Constituency: London

Personal details
- Born: September 25, 1884 Toronto, Ontario
- Died: February 18, 1965 (aged 80) Ancaster, Ontario
- Party: Progressive Conservative
- Spouses: Marguerite Benton (m. 1929): Flora Coleman
- Occupation: Businessman

William Gourlay Webster (September 25, 1884 – February 18, 1965) was a civil engineer, land surveyor and politician in Ontario, Canada. He represented London in the Legislative Assembly of Ontario from 1943 to 1948 as a Progressive Conservative.

The son of Reverend Andrew F. Webster and Annie Gourlay, he was born in Toronto and was educated in Orillia and at the University of Toronto. Webster practised as a civil engineer in Dunnville and Brantford from 1907 to 1914. In 1912, Webster received his commission as an Ontario Land Surveyor. He served overseas as a lieutenant with the Canadian Engineers during World War I; then, from 1919 to 1927, he operated his own construction company. From 1927 to 1932, Webster worked on levees in Missouri. In 1933, he became the founder and president of the Webster Air Equipment Company in London. His son John B. Webster later became company president.

Webster served in the provincial cabinet as a minister without portfolio from 1944 to 1948.

In 1929, he married Marguerite Benton. He later married Flora Coleman.

Webster died in Ancaster at the age of 80.
