= Campbell Calder =

Canadian politician

Ontario MPP
- In office 1948–1951
- Preceded by: William Gourlay Webster
- Succeeded by: John Robarts
- Constituency: London

Personal details
- Born: November 6, 1910 London, Ontario, Canada
- Died: February 7, 1994 (aged 83) London, Ontario, Canada
- Party: Liberal
- Spouse: Winifred Margaret Ferguson

Campbell Carlyle Calder (November 6, 1910 – February 7, 1994) was a Canadian politician. He was elected to the Legislative Assembly of Ontario as the Liberal Member of Provincial Parliament (MPP) for London, Ontario in 1948. In 1950, he was a candidate in the Ontario Liberal leadership convention, placing fourth. He served only one term in the legislature leaving in 1951 when he was defeated by Progressive Conservative John Robarts.

He died at the University Hospital in London in 1994.
