= Prince Edward—Hastings (federal electoral district) =

Former federal electoral district in Ontario, Canada

Coordinates: 44.52°N 77.72°W

Ontario electoral district
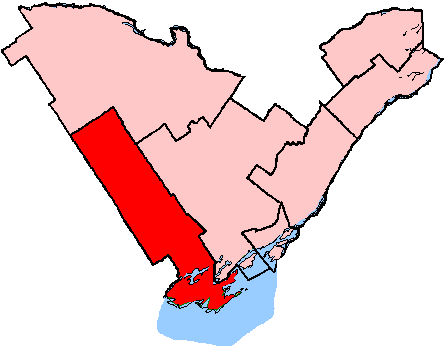
- Prince Edward—Hastings shown within the Eastern Ontario region

Defunct federal electoral district
- Legislature: House of Commons
- District created: 1966
- District abolished: 2013
- First contested: 1968
- Last contested: 2011
- District webpage: profile, map

Demographics
- Population (2011): 117,057
- Electors (2011): 88,198
- Area (km²): 6,654.82
- Census division(s): Hastings, Prince Edward
- Census subdivision(s): Bancroft, Belleville, Carlow/Mayo, Centre Hastings, Deseronto, Faraday, Hastings Highlands, Limerick, Madoc, Marmora and Lake, Prince Edward, Stirling-Rawdon, Tudor and Cashel, Tweed, Tyendinaga, Tyendinaga Mohawk Territory, Wollaston

Prince Edward—Hastings was a federal electoral district in Ontario, Canada, that existed in the House of Commons of Canada from 1968 to 2015. Its population in 2006 was 113,227. It was redistributed between Bay of Quinte electoral district and Hastings—Lennox and Addington electoral district as a result of the Canadian federal electoral redistribution, 2012.

== History ==
The electoral district was created in 1966 from parts of Hastings South, Hastings—Frontenac, Northumberland, and Prince Edward—Lennox ridings.

It consisted of the County of Prince Edward, the Townships of Rawdon and Sidney (excluding the City of Belleville) in the County of Hastings, and the Townships of Brighton, Cramahe, Murray and Seymour in the County of Northumberland.

The electoral district was abolished in 1976 when it was redistributed between Northumberland and Prince Edward ridings, but Prince Edward riding was renamed "Prince Edward—Hastings" in 1978 before an election was held.

In 1976, Prince Edward riding was defined to consist of the County of Prince Edward, and, in the County of Hastings, the Townships of Hungerford, Huntingdon, Thurlow and Tyendinaga, the City of Belleville, and the Town of Deseronto, the Village of Frankford, and Tyendinaga Indian Reserve No. 38.

In 1996, it was redefined to consist of the County of Prince Edward, and the part of the County of Hastings lying south of and including the townships of Hungerford, Huntingdon and Rawdon, south of but excluding the Village of Stirling, and excluding the City of Trenton.

In 2003, it was redefined to consist of the County of Prince Edward and the County of Hastings (except the City of Quinte West).

As part of the Canadian federal electoral redistribution, 2012, the southern portion of district forms the bulk of the new Bay of Quinte district, while the northern portion becomes part of Hastings—Lennox and Addington.

== Members of Parliament ==
This riding has elected the following members of Parliament:

Parliament	Years	Member	Party
Prince Edward—Hastings; Riding created from Hastings South, Hastings—Frontenac, Northumberland and Prince Edward—Lennox
28th	1968–1972	George Hees	Progressive Conservative
29th	1972–1974	George Hees	Progressive Conservative
30th	1974–1979	George Hees	Progressive Conservative
31st	1979–1980	Jack Ellis	Progressive Conservative
32nd	1980–1984	Jack Ellis	Progressive Conservative
33rd	1984–1988	Jack Ellis	Progressive Conservative
34th	1988–1993	Lyle Vanclief	Liberal
35th	1993–1997	Lyle Vanclief	Liberal
36th	1997–2000	Lyle Vanclief	Liberal
37th	2000–2004	Lyle Vanclief	Liberal
38th	2004–2006	Daryl Kramp	Conservative
39th	2006–2008	Daryl Kramp	Conservative
40th	2008–2011	Daryl Kramp	Conservative
41st	2011–2015	Daryl Kramp	Conservative
Riding dissolved into Bay of Quinte and Hastings—Lennox and Addington

== Election results ==
2011 Canadian federal election
Party	Candidate	Votes	%	±%	Expenditures
Conservative	Daryl Kramp	29,062	53.25	+3.06	–
New Democratic	Michael McMahon	12,940	23.71	+9.93	–
Liberal	Peter Tinsley	10,230	18.75	-8.31	–
Green	Patrick Larkin	1,887	3.46	-4.98	–
Progressive Canadian	Andrew Skinner	283	0.52	–	–
Independent	Tim Hickey	171	0.31	–	–
Total valid votes/Expense limit		54,573	99.63		–
Total rejected ballots		205	0.37	+0.04	
Turnout		54,778	61.40	+2.34	
Eligible voters		89,208	–	–	
Conservative hold		Swing		-3.43	

2008 Canadian federal election
Party	Candidate	Votes	%	±%	Expenditures
Conservative	Daryl Kramp	26,061	50.19	+1.53	$85,625
Liberal	Ken Cole	14,048	27.06	-4.53	$71,249
New Democratic	Michael McMahon	7,156	13.78	-1.06	$14,473
Green	Alan Coxwell	4,379	8.43	+4.26	$12,930
Independent	Paul Barnes	276	0.53	–	$0
Total valid votes/Expense limit		51,920	99.67		$90,734
Total rejected ballots		172	0.33	-0.05	
Turnout		52,092	59.06	-6.56	
Eligible voters		88,198			
Conservative hold		Swing		+3.03	

2006 Canadian federal election
Party	Candidate	Votes	%	±%
Conservative	Daryl Kramp	27,787	48.7	+6.3
Liberal	Bob Vaughan	18,034	31.6	-6.0
New Democratic	Michael McMahon	8,474	14.8	-0.4
Green	Joseph Sahadat	2,386	4.2	+0.2
Independent	Tim Hickey	416	0.7	–
Total valid votes		57,097	100.0	

2004 Canadian federal election
Party	Candidate	Votes	%	±%
Conservative	Daryl Kramp	22,598	42.4	-0.3
Liberal	Bruce Knutson	20,042	37.6	-14.0
New Democratic	Dan Douglas	8,105	15.2	+9.4
Green	Tom Lawson	2,130	4.0	
Independent	Joseph Sahadat	468	0.9	
Total valid votes		53,343	100.0	

Note: Conservative vote is compared to the total of the Canadian Alliance and Progressive Conservative votes in the 2000 election.

2000 Canadian federal election
Party	Candidate	Votes	%	±%
Liberal	Lyle Vanclief	20,055	50.5	-1.1
Alliance	Jim Graham	9,707	24.4	+3.2
Progressive Conservative	Dennis Timbrell	8,083	20.3	-1.1
New Democratic	Jason Gannon	1,897	4.8	-1.0
Total valid votes		39,742	100.0	

Note: Canadian Alliance vote is compared to the Reform Party vote in the 1997 election.

1997 Canadian federal election
Party	Candidate	Votes	%	±%
Liberal	Lyle Vanclief	22,415	51.6	-5.7
Progressive Conservative	Dennis Timbrell	9,305	21.4	+3.6
Reform	Lloyd Lewis	9,219	21.2	+1.7
New Democratic	Barb Dolan	2,512	5.8	+3.0
Total valid votes		43,451	100.0	

1993 Canadian federal election
Party	Candidate	Votes	%	±%
Liberal	Lyle Vanclief	26,483	57.3	+14.2
Reform	Marjorie Foster	9,019	19.5	
Progressive Conservative	Jim Hughes	8,245	17.8	-18.3
New Democratic	Jim Martin	1,275	2.8	-11.7
National	Christine Kosman	639	1.4	
Christian Heritage	Dave Switzer	556	1.2	-3.3
Total valid votes		46,217	100.0	

1988 Canadian federal election
Party	Candidate	Votes	%	±%
Liberal	Lyle Vanclief	19,559	43.1	+16.5
Progressive Conservative	Jack Arthur	16,408	36.2	-18.1
New Democratic	Don Wilson	6,564	14.5	-4.0
Christian Heritage	John B. Herring	2,063	4.5	
Confederation of Regions	Doug Grant	522	1.2	
Libertarian	Heather-Anne Lapsley	229	0.5	
Total valid votes		45,345	100.0	

1984 Canadian federal election
Party	Candidate	Votes	%	±%
Progressive Conservative	Jack Ellis	21,034	54.3	+8.4
Liberal	Robert Scott	10,321	26.7	-8.2
New Democratic	Don Wilson	7,162	18.5	-0.2
Independent	George Nip Casey	197	0.5	
Total valid votes		38,714	100.0	

1980 Canadian federal election
Party	Candidate	Votes	%	±%
Progressive Conservative	Jack Ellis	16,893	45.9	-7.4
Liberal	Ben Prinzen	12,821	34.8	+3.5
New Democratic	Donald Wilson	6,889	18.7	+4.0
Independent	Bill Hawthorne	211	0.6	-0.1
Total valid votes		36,814	100.0	

1979 Canadian federal election
Party	Candidate	Votes	%	±%
Progressive Conservative	Jack Ellis	21,088	53.3	-0.5
Liberal	Kay Manderville	12,394	31.3	-3.7
New Democratic	Don Wilson	5,833	14.7	+4.3
Independent	William R. Hawthorne	261	0.7	
Total valid votes		39,576	100.0	

1974 Canadian federal election
Party	Candidate	Votes	%	±%
Progressive Conservative	George Hees	19,219	53.8	-5.7
Liberal	George Cunningham	12,504	35.0	+4.0
New Democratic	Harvey Gottfried	3,727	10.4	+0.9
Independent	W. Bryan Burgess	277	0.8	
Total valid votes		35,727	100.0	

1972 Canadian federal election
Party	Candidate	Votes	%	±%
Progressive Conservative	George Hees	19,842	59.5	+8.7
Liberal	George W. Cunningham	10,353	31.0	-9.8
New Democratic	Richard Lunn	3,168	9.5	+1.2
Total valid votes		33,363	100.0	

1968 Canadian federal election
Party	Candidate	Votes	%
Progressive Conservative	George Hees	15,682	50.8
Liberal	George Wesley Cunningham	12,614	40.9
New Democratic	Peter P. Miedema	2,569	8.3
Total valid votes		30,865	100.0

== See also ==
- List of Canadian electoral districts
- Historical federal electoral districts of Canada
