= Dick Treleaven =

Canadian politician

Ontario MPP
- In office 1981–1987
- Preceded by: Harry Parrott
- Succeeded by: Charlie Tatham
- Constituency: Oxford

Personal details
- Born: July 11, 1934 (age 91) Goderich, Ontario
- Party: Progressive Conservative Party
- Occupation: Lawyer

Richard L. Treleaven (born July 11, 1934) is a former politician in Ontario, Canada. He served in the Legislative Assembly of Ontario from 1981 to 1987, as a member of the Progressive Conservative Party.

== Background ==
Treleaven was born in Goderich, Ontario, He was educated at the University of Western Ontario and the Osgoode Law School. He obtained a Bachelor of Laws degree, and worked as a barrister and solicitor. He was also a member of the Waterloo-Wellington Hunt Club, and coach of the Woodstock Y Swim Team.

== Politics ==
He was elected to the Ontario legislature in the 1981 provincial election, defeating Liberal Party candidate John Finlay by 4,082 votes in Oxford. For the next four years, he served as a backbench supporter of the Bill Davis and Frank Miller administrations.

The Progressive Conservatives were reduced to a tenuous minority government under Miller's leadership in the 1985 provincial election and Treleaven was re-elected in Oxford. He was named as Deputy Speaker of the Assembly on June 6, 1985. He retained his position after Miller's government was defeated in the house, and the Liberals formed government under David Peterson. In 1986, he was a prominent opponent of Peterson's plan to ban extra billing by Ontario doctors.

Treleaven was defeated in the 1987 provincial election, losing to Liberal candidate Charlie Tatham by 2,874 votes.
