= Frank Follwell =

Canadian politician

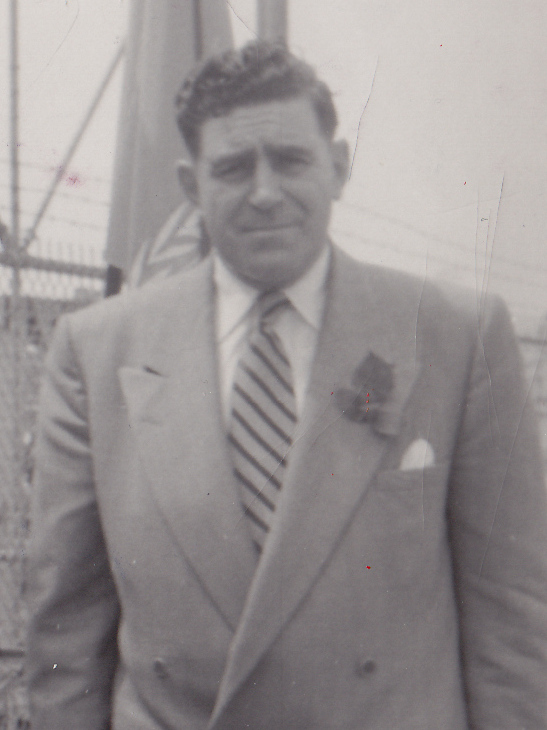
- Follwell, c. 1953

Member of Parliament for Hastings South
- In office June 1949 – June 1957
- Preceded by: George Henry Stokes
- Succeeded by: Lee Grills

Personal details
- Born: Frank Sidney Follwell; 6 May 1906 London, England
- Died: 3 December 1992 (aged 86)
- Party: Liberal
- Profession: merchant, realtor

Frank Sidney Follwell (6 May 1906 – 3 December 1992) was a Liberal party member of the House of Commons of Canada, merchant and realtor. He was born in London, England. He was the mayor of Belleville, Ontario from 1945 to 1947.

He was first elected to Parliament at the Hastings South riding in the 1949 general election then re-elected in 1953. Follwell was defeated by Lee Grills of the Progressive Conservative party in the 1957 election.
