= John Robarts =

Canadian politician, Premier of Ontario (1917–1982)

The Honourable John Robarts PC CC QC
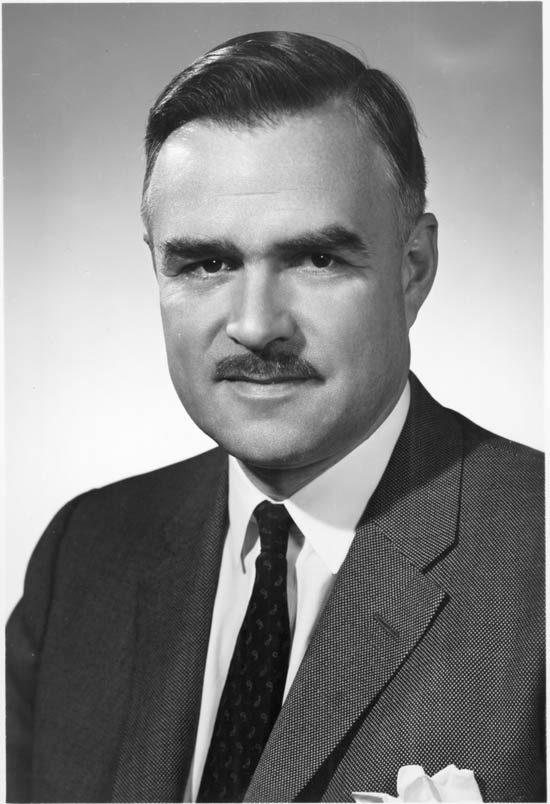
- Robarts in 1960

17th Premier of Ontario
- In office November 8, 1961 – March 1, 1971
- Monarch: Elizabeth II
- Lieutenant Governor: John Keiller MacKay; William Earl Rowe; William Ross Macdonald
- Preceded by: Leslie Frost
- Succeeded by: Bill Davis

Member of the Legislative Assembly of Ontario
- In office June 9, 1955 – October 21, 1971
- Preceded by: New riding
- Succeeded by: Gordon Walker
- Constituency: London North
- In office November 22, 1951 – June 9, 1955
- Preceded by: Campbell Calder
- Succeeded by: Riding abolished
- Constituency: London

Personal details
- Born: John Parmenter Robarts; January 11, 1917 Banff, Alberta, Canada
- Died: October 18, 1982 (aged 65) Toronto, Ontario, Canada
- Resting place: St. James Cemetery
- Party: Progressive Conservative
- Spouses: Norah McCormick (div. 1970s); Katherine Sickafuse (m. 1976)
- Children: Timothy (1956–1977), Robin Hollis Jeffrey (1953–2010)
- Education: University of Western Ontario; Osgoode Hall Law School
- Cabinet: Minister without portfolio (1958–1959)

Military service
- Allegiance: Canadian
- Branch/service: Royal Canadian Navy
- Years of service: 1942–1945
- Rank: Lieutenant
- Unit: HMCS Uganda
- Battles/wars: Pacific War

John Parmenter Robarts (January 11, 1917 – October 18, 1982) was a Canadian lawyer and politician who served as the 17th premier of Ontario from 1961 to 1971. He was a member of the Progressive Conservative Party of Ontario.

== Early life ==
Robarts was born in Banff, Alberta, to Herbert Roberts and Ellen Florence May Robarts, making him the only Ontario premier not to have been born in Ontario. As a young man, he moved to London, Ontario, with his family, where he studied at Central Collegiate (today, London Central Secondary School) and at the University of Western Ontario (UWO) in business administration. While attending UWO, he joined the Delta Upsilon fraternity. He played for Western Mustangs football, coached by John P. Metras.

Robarts enrolled to study law at Osgoode Hall Law School, but his education was interrupted by service with the Royal Canadian Navy during World War II. He served as an officer on HMCS Uganda. After the war, he returned to law school and graduated in 1948.

== Early political career ==
Robarts practiced law in London, Ontario, and was elected to city council in 1948. In 1951, he was elected as a member of provincial parliament (MPP) to the Legislative Assembly of Ontario, as a Progressive Conservative (PC) from the city. In that era, MPPs not in cabinet were essentially working part-time due to relatively light legislative duties. Robarts commuted by train from the Queen's Park legislature in Toronto, the provincial capital, to his family and law practice in London, effectively combining his legislative work with his legal career. His wife Norah disliked Toronto and remained at home in London for most of their marriage. The couple raised two children.

He entered the cabinet of Leslie Frost in 1958 as minister without portfolio, and was promoted to minister of education in 1959. The province was in the midst of a major building phase with its education system, to accommodate an enormous increase in enrollment following the Baby Boomer generation of the post-World War II era, and Robarts played an important role as education minister, with the establishment of new institutions such as York University.

== Premier of Ontario ==
In 1961, Robarts became the 17th premier of Ontario, and served in that capacity until 1971. He was an advocate of individual freedoms, and promoted the rights of the provinces against the centralizing initiatives of the federal government. He also promoted national unity against Quebec separatism, and hosted the 1967 "Confederation of Tomorrow" conference in Toronto. Although unsuccessful attempt to achieve an agreement for a new Constitution of Canada, Robarts has been praised for facilitating interprovincial dialogue with Quebec.

He initially opposed Canadian Medicare when it was proposed, but later endorsed it fully following New Democratic Party (NDP) candidate Kenneth Bolton's upset by-election victory on the issue in the London-area riding of Middlesex South.

As a civil libertarian, and a strong believer in the promotion of both official languages, Robarts opened the door to French language education in Ontario schools. In 1972 he was made a Companion of the Order of Canada.

Nicknamed "the Chairman of the Board" during his tenure, Robarts is remembered for his steps to promote and improve education. He was responsible for the construction of five new universities including York University, the establishment of the Ontario Science Centre and Ontario Place, the creation of numerous teacher's colleges, the creation of the community college system, the GO Transit commuter rail system, introducing nuclear power to Ontario's electricity grid, and launching the Ontario Scholar fund for high school students graduating with an A average. Throughout his premiership, Robarts had balanced budgets every year.

== Later life ==
After retiring from office, Robarts co-chaired the Task Force on Canadian Unity with Jean-Luc Pépin, and joined a Toronto law firm as well as the boards of directors of several major corporations.

He served as chancellor of the University of Western Ontario from 1971 to 1976. He served as chancellor of York University from 1977 to 1982.

Robarts and his wife divorced in the early seventies, and he remarried to a woman 28 years his junior.

Robarts died by suicide on October 18, 1982. He had been suffering from depression as a result of the 1977 suicide of his son, Timothy, and a series of debilitating strokes.

He was given a state funeral at St. Paul's Anglican Church in Toronto. He is buried in St. James Cemetery.

== Legacy ==
The Robarts Centre for Canadian Studies at York University was founded in 1984 in his name. The John P. Robarts Research Institute (renamed The Robarts Research Institute in 2005) at the University of Western Ontario was officially opened in 1986. Also in London is the Robarts School for the Deaf, and the John P. Robarts elementary school. The 16-storey John P. Robarts Research Library at the University of Toronto is also named in his honour.

== Biographies ==
University of Western Ontario professor Allan Kerr McDougall authored the first full-length biography: John P. Robarts: His Life and Government, in 1986, published the University of Toronto Press. TV Ontario journalist and host, Steve Paikin, wrote a biography in 2005, Public Triumph, Private Tragedy: The Double Life of John P. Robarts published by Viking Press.

Frost ministry, Province of Ontario (1949–1961)
Cabinet post (1)
Predecessor	Office	Successor
William James Dunlop	Minister of Education; 1959–1962	Bill Davis
Academic offices
Preceded by Albert Trueman	Chancellor of the University of Western Ontario; 1971–1976	Succeeded by J. Allyn Taylor
Preceded by Walter L. Gordon	Chancellor of York University; 1977–1982	Succeeded by John S. Proctor
