= London (provincial electoral district) =

Former provincial electoral district in Ontario, Canada

Ontario electoral district

Defunct provincial electoral district
- Legislature: Legislative Assembly of Ontario
- District created: 1867
- District abolished: 1953
- First contested: 1867
- Last contested: 1951

London was an electoral riding in Ontario, Canada. It was created in 1867 at the time of confederation and was abolished in 1925 before the 1926 election. It was re-established in 1934 and existed until 1955 when it was abolished again.

== Members of Provincial Parliament ==
London
Assembly	Years	Member	Party
1st	1867–1871	John Carling	Conservative
2nd	1871–1872	John Carling	Conservative
2nd	1872–1874	William Ralph Meredith	Conservative
3rd	1875–1879	William Ralph Meredith	Conservative
4th	1879–1883	William Ralph Meredith	Conservative
5th	1883–1886	William Ralph Meredith	Conservative
6th	1886–1890	William Ralph Meredith	Conservative
7th	1890–1894	William Ralph Meredith	Conservative
8th	1894–1898	Thomas Saunders Hobbs	Liberal
9th	1898–1902	Francis Baxter Leys	Liberal
10th	1902–1904	Adam Beck	Conservative
11th	1905–1908	Adam Beck	Conservative
12th	1908–1911	Adam Beck	Conservative
13th	1911–1914	Adam Beck	Conservative
14th	1914–1919	Adam Beck	Conservative
15th	1919–1923	Hugh Allan Stevenson	United Farmers
16th	1923–1925	Adam Beck	Conservative
Split into London North and London South before the 1926 election
19th	1934–1937	Archibald Stuart Duncan	Liberal
20th	1937–1943	Archibald Stuart Duncan	Liberal
21st	1943–1945	William Gourlay Webster	Progressive Conservative
22nd	1945–1948	William Gourlay Webster	Progressive Conservative
23rd	1948–1951	Campbell Calder	Liberal
24th	1951–1955	John Robarts	Progressive Conservative
Sourced from the Ontario Legislative Assembly
Split into London North and London South before the 1955 election

== Election results ==
1951 Ontario general election
Party	Candidate	Votes	%	±%
Progressive Conservative	John Robarts	13,926	47.38	+9.91
Liberal	Campbell Calder	10,814	36.79	–3.97
Co-operative Commonwealth	Patrick P. Daley	4,655	15.84	–5.94
Total valid votes		29,395	99.06	
Total rejected ballots		278	0.94	–0.08
Turnout		29,673	61.03	–3.20
Eligible voters		48,623		
Progressive Conservative gain from Liberal		Swing		+6.94
Source: Elections Ontario

1948 Ontario general election
Party	Candidate	Votes	%	±%
Liberal	Campbell Calder	12,730	40.75	+9.63
Progressive Conservative	William Gourlay Webster	11,703	37.47	–8.56
Co-operative Commonwealth	Oliver Hodges	6,803	21.78	+0.04
Total valid votes		31,236	98.98	
Total rejected ballots		321	1.02	–0.21
Turnout		31,557	64.23	–12.97
Eligible voters		49,134		
Liberal gain from Progressive Conservative		Swing		+9.09
Source: Elections Ontario

1945 Ontario general election
Party	Candidate	Votes	%	±%
Progressive Conservative	William Gourlay Webster	16,649	46.03	+5.37
Liberal	Alexander S. Ferguson	11,259	31.13	+3.12
Co-operative Commonwealth	Oliver Hodges	7,863	21.74	–9.61
Labor–Progressive	Thomas E. Dodd	402	1.11	–
Total valid votes		36,173	98.77	
Total rejected ballots		451	1.23	+0.29
Turnout		36,624	77.19	+16.23
Eligible voters		47,445		
Progressive Conservative hold		Swing		+1.13
Source: Elections Ontario

1943 Ontario general election
Party	Candidate	Votes	%	±%
Progressive Conservative	William Gourlay Webster	10,312	40.65	+3.54
Co-operative Commonwealth	Oliver Hodges	7,952	31.35	+24.09
Liberal	Archibald Stuart Duncan	7,103	28.00	–27.18
Total valid votes		25,367	99.06	
Total rejected ballots		241	0.94	+0.93
Turnout		25,608	60.96	–10.05
Eligible voters		42,007		
Progressive Conservative gain from Liberal		Swing		+15.36
Source: Elections Ontario

1937 Ontario general election
Party	Candidate	Votes	%	±%
Liberal	Archibald Stuart Duncan	16,144	55.19	+0.50
Conservative	W. A. Townshend	10,857	37.11	–7.20
Co-operative Commonwealth	Charles Goddard	2,124	7.26	–
Socialist-Labour	Harold Rowbottom	129	0.44	–0.56
Total valid votes		29,254	99.99	
Total rejected ballots		2	0.01	–1.16
Turnout		29,256	71.01	–3.95
Eligible voters		41,202		
Liberal hold		Swing		+3.85
Source: Elections Ontario

1934 Ontario general election
Party	Candidate	Votes	%	±%
Liberal	Archibald Stuart Duncan	16,442	54.69	–
Conservative	James Percy Moore	13,323	44.31	–
Socialist-Labour	Robert Smart	300	1.00	–
Total valid votes		30,065	98.84	
Total rejected ballots		354	1.16	–1.44
Turnout		30,419	74.95	+28.49
Eligible voters		40,585		
Liberal gain from Conservative		Swing		+0.00
Source: Elections Ontario

1923 Ontario general election
Party	Candidate	Votes	%	±%
Conservative	Adam Beck	9,865	64.85	+18.79
Labour	Hugh Allan Stevenson	2,254	14.82	–39.13
Liberal	Isabel C. Armstrong	1,851	12.17	–
Independent	James M. Donahue	1,243	8.17	–
Total valid votes		15,213	97.40	
Total rejected ballots		406	2.60	–0.17
Turnout		15,619	46.46	–30.88
Eligible voters		33,617		
Conservative gain from Labour		Swing		+9.39
Source: Elections Ontario

1919 Ontario general election
Party	Candidate	Votes	%	±%
Labour	Hugh Allan Stevenson	13,008	53.94	+48.44
Independent	Adam Beck	11,107	46.06	–10.71
Total valid votes		24,115	97.23	
Total rejected ballots		687	2.77	+1.84
Turnout		24,802	77.34	+14.41
Eligible voters		32,068		
Labour gain from Conservative		Swing		+29.57
Source: Elections Ontario

1914 Ontario general election
Party	Candidate	Votes	%	±%
Conservative	Adam Beck	4,300	56.77	–
Liberal	William John Stevenson	2,858	37.73	–
Labour	John David Jacobs	417	5.50	–
Total valid votes		7,575	99.07	
Total rejected ballots		71	0.93	–
Turnout		7,646	62.94	–
Eligible voters		12,149		
Conservative hold		Swing		–
Source: Elections Ontario

1911 Ontario general election
Party	Candidate	Votes
Conservative	Adam Beck	acclaimed
Source: Elections Ontario

1908 Ontario general election
Party	Candidate	Votes	%	±%
Conservative	Adam Beck	5,084	58.00	+5.73
Liberal	John Millar McEvoy	3,681	42.00	–4.09
Total valid votes		8,765	99.34	
Total rejected ballots		58	0.66	+0.14
Turnout		8,823	78.42	–7.77
Eligible voters		11,251		
Conservative hold		Swing		+4.91
Source: Elections Ontario

1905 Ontario general election
Party	Candidate	Votes	%	±%
Conservative	Adam Beck	4,783	52.27	+7.22
Liberal	Mr. Rumball	4,217	46.09	+2.74
Socialist	Mr. Pearse	150	1.64	+0.41
Total valid votes		9,150	99.48	
Total rejected ballots		48	0.52	–0.63
Turnout		9,198	86.19	+4.04
Eligible voters		10,672		
Conservative hold		Swing		+2.24
Source: Elections Ontario

1902 Ontario general election
Party	Candidate	Votes	%	±%
Conservative	Adam Beck	3,445	45.06	–
Liberal	Francis Baxter Leys	3,314	43.34	–37.14
Prohibitionist	F. Daley	793	10.37	–
Socialist	F. Haselgrove	94	1.23	–
Total valid votes		7,646	98.85	
Total rejected ballots		89	1.15	+0.13
Turnout		7,735	82.15	+53.40
Eligible voters		9,416		
Conservative gain from Liberal		Swing		+0.00
Source: Elections Ontario

Ontario provincial by-election, July 9, 1901 Francis Baxter Leys sought re-election in support of removing a dam on the Thames River
Party	Candidate	Votes	%	±%
Liberal	Francis Baxter Leys	2,182	80.49	+29.74
Unknown	J.J. Darch	529	19.51	–
Total valid votes		2,711	98.98	
Total rejected ballots		28	1.02	–0.63
Turnout		2,739	28.74	–57.20
Eligible voters		9,529		
Liberal hold		Swing		+14.87
Source: Elections Ontario

1898 Ontario general election
Party	Candidate	Votes	%	±%
Liberal	Francis Baxter Leys	3,994	50.75	–5.12
Conservative	Adam Beck	3,693	46.93	+2.80
Independent	Mr. Ashplant	126	1.60	–
Labour	C. H. Gould	57	0.72	–
Total valid votes		7,870	98.35	
Total rejected ballots		132	1.65	+1.65
Turnout		8,002	85.94	–
Eligible voters		9,311		
Liberal hold		Swing		–3.96
Source: Elections Ontario

Ontario provincial by-election, November 20, 1894 William Ralph Meredith appointed as a judge
Party	Candidate	Votes	%	±%
Liberal	Thomas Saunders Hobbs	3,820	55.87	+6.94
Conservative	E.T. Essery	3,017	44.13	–6.94
Total valid votes		6,837	100.00	
Total rejected ballots		–		
Turnout		6,837	–	–
Eligible voters				
Liberal gain from Conservative		Swing		+6.94
Source: Elections Ontario

1894 Ontario general election
Party	Candidate	Votes	%	±%
Conservative	William Ralph Meredith	3,273	51.07	–
Liberal	Thomas Saunders Hobbs	3,136	48.93	–
Total valid votes		6,409	98.89	
Total rejected ballots		72	1.11	–
Turnout		6,481	86.29	–
Eligible voters		7,511		
Conservative hold		Swing		–
Source: Elections Ontario

1890 Ontario general election
Party	Candidate	Votes
Conservative	William Ralph Meredith	acclaimed
Source: Elections Ontario

1886 Ontario general election
Party	Candidate	Votes	%	±%
Conservative	William Ralph Meredith	1,679	53.56	–
Labour	S. Peddle	1,456	46.44	–
Total valid votes		3,135	99.05	
Total rejected ballots		30	0.95	–
Turnout		3,165	40.48	–
Eligible voters		7,819		
Conservative hold		Swing		–
Source: Elections Ontario

1883 Ontario general election
Party	Candidate	Votes
Conservative	William Ralph Meredith	acclaimed
Source: Elections Ontario

1879 Ontario general election
Party	Candidate	Votes	%	±%
Conservative	William Ralph Meredith	1,578	58.25	+5.41
Liberal	Mr. Magee	1,131	41.75	−5.41
Total valid votes		2,709	55.24	−5.15
Eligible voters		4,904		
Conservative hold		Swing		+5.41
Source: Elections Ontario

1875 Ontario general election
Party	Candidate	Votes	%	±%
Conservative	William Ralph Meredith	1,311	52.84	+1.72
Liberal	J. Durand	1,170	47.16	−1.72
Turnout		2,481	60.39	
Eligible voters		4,108		
Conservative hold		Swing		+1.72
Source: Elections Ontario

Ontario provincial by-election, September 4, 1872 Resignation of John Carling
Party	Candidate	Votes	%	±%
Conservative	William Ralph Meredith	932	51.12	−12.71
Liberal	J. Durand	891	48.88	+12.71
Total valid votes		1,823	100.0	+18.15
Conservative hold		Swing		−12.71
Source: History of the Electoral Districts, Legislatures and Ministries of the Province of Ontario

1871 Ontario general election
Party	Candidate	Votes	%	±%
Conservative	John Carling	985	63.84	+2.83
Liberal	Mr. Cornish	558	36.16	−2.83
Turnout		1,543	57.06	+1.06
Eligible voters		2,704		
Conservative hold		Swing		+2.83
Source: Elections Ontario

1867 Ontario general election
Party	Candidate	Votes	%
Conservative	John Carling	948	61.00
Liberal	J. Durand	606	39.00
Total valid votes		1,554	56.00
Eligible voters		2,775	
Conservative pickup new district.			
Source: Elections Ontario
