= Oxford (provincial electoral district) =

Provincial electoral district in Ontario, Canada

Coordinates: 43.06°N 80.6°W

Ontario electoral district
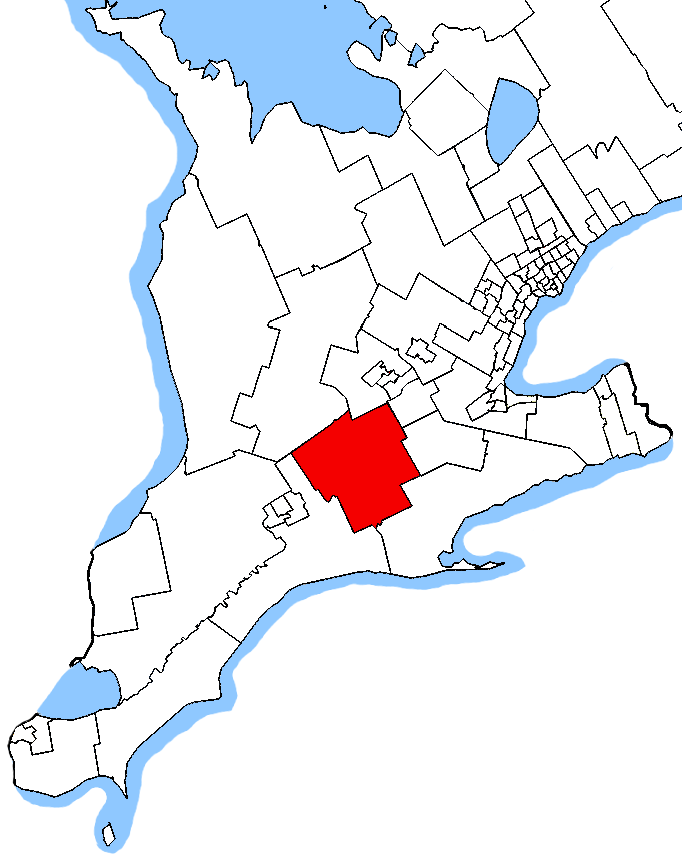
- Oxford in relation to the southern Ontario ridings

Provincial electoral district
- Legislature: Legislative Assembly of Ontario
MPP
Ernie Hardeman
Progressive Conservative
- District created: 1999
- First contested: 1999
- Last contested: 2025

Demographics
- Population (2016): 113,790
- Electors (2018): 89,597
- Area (km²): 2,270
- Pop. density (per km²): 50.1
- Census division: Oxford County
- Census subdivision(s): Woodstock, Tillsonburg, Ingersoll, Norwich, Zorra, South-West Oxford, East Zorra – Tavistock, Blandford-Blenheim

Oxford is a provincial electoral district in Ontario, Canada, that has been represented in the Legislative Assembly of Ontario since the 1999 provincial election.

It consists of the county of Oxford and a small portion of Brant.

== Members of Provincial Parliament ==
Oxford
Assembly	Years	Member	Party
Created from Oxford North and Oxford South ridings in 1934
19th	1934–1937	Patrick Dewan	Liberal
20th	1937–1943	Patrick Dewan	Liberal
21st	1943–1945	Thomas Roy Dent	Progressive Conservative
22nd	1945–1948	Thomas Roy Dent	Progressive Conservative
23rd	1948–1951	Thomas Roy Dent	Progressive Conservative
24th	1951–1955	Thomas Roy Dent	Progressive Conservative
25th	1955–1959	Gord Innes	Liberal
26th	1959–1963	Gord Innes	Liberal
27th	1963–1967	Gord Pittock	Progressive Conservative
28th	1967–1971	Gord Innes	Liberal
29th	1971–1975	Harry Parrott	Progressive Conservative
30th	1975–1977	Harry Parrott	Progressive Conservative
31st	1977–1981	Harry Parrott	Progressive Conservative
32nd	1981–1985	Dick Treleaven	Progressive Conservative
33rd	1985–1987	Dick Treleaven	Progressive Conservative
34th	1987–1990	Charlie Tatham	Liberal
35th	1990–1995	Kimble Sutherland	New Democratic
36th	1995–1999	Ernie Hardeman	Progressive Conservative
37th	1999–2003	Ernie Hardeman	Progressive Conservative
38th	2003–2007	Ernie Hardeman	Progressive Conservative
39th	2007–2011	Ernie Hardeman	Progressive Conservative
40th	2011–2014	Ernie Hardeman	Progressive Conservative
41st	2014–2018	Ernie Hardeman	Progressive Conservative
42nd	2018–2022	Ernie Hardeman	Progressive Conservative
43rd	2022–2025	Ernie Hardeman	Progressive Conservative
44th	2025–present	Ernie Hardeman	Progressive Conservative

== Election results ==
Winning party in each polling division of Oxford at the 2025 Ontario general election

2025 Ontario general election
Party	Candidate	Votes	%	±%
Progressive Conservative	Ernie Hardeman	27,061	55.26	+5.25
Liberal	Bernia Martin	11,348	23.17	+10.86
New Democratic	Khadijah Haliru	5,374	10.97	–10.47
Green	Colton Kaufman	2,182	4.46	–0.28
Ontario Party	Grace Harper	1,414	2.89	–5.19
New Blue	Peter Beimers	1,317	2.69	–0.74
Libertarian	Henryk Szymczyszyn	274	0.56	–
Total valid votes		48,970	99.34	
Total rejected, unmarked and declined ballots		326	0.66	+0.12
Turnout		49,296	48.62	+2.17
Eligible voters		101,383		
Progressive Conservative hold		Swing		–2.81
Source: Elections Ontario

Winning party in each polling division of Oxford at the 2022 Ontario general election

2022 Ontario general election
Party	Candidate	Votes	%	±%	Expenditures
Progressive Conservative	Ernie Hardeman	22,166	50.01	–5.72	$47,286
New Democratic	Lindsay Wilson	9,504	21.44	–8.98	$37,217
Liberal	Mary Holmes	5,457	12.31	+5.39	$23,863
Ontario Party	Karl Toews	3,579	8.08	+7.22	$39,947
Green	Cheryle Rose Baker	2,097	4.73	+0.42	$570
New Blue	Connie Oldenburger	1,518	3.43	–	$7,700
Total valid votes/expense limit		44,321	99.46	–	$134,298
Total rejected, unmarked and declined ballots		240	0.54	–0.91	
Turnout		44,561	46.45	–12.79	
Eligible voters		95,927			
Progressive Conservative hold		Swing		+1.63	
Source: Elections Ontario

2018 Ontario general election
Party	Candidate	Votes	%	±%
Progressive Conservative	Ernie Hardeman	29,152	55.73	+9.49
New Democratic	Tara King	15,917	30.43	+4.64
Liberal	James Howard	3,620	6.92	–14.39
Green	Albert de Jong	2,254	4.31	–0.53
Ontario Party	Robert van Ryswyck	447	0.85	–
Libertarian	Chris Swift	370	0.71	–0.18
Independent	David Sikal	335	0.64	–
Freedom	Tim Hodges	216	0.41	–0.52
Total valid votes		52,311	98.55	
Total rejected, unmarked and declined ballots		771	1.45	–0.33
Turnout		53,082	59.25	+7.32
Eligible voters		89,597		
Progressive Conservative hold		Swing		+2.42
Source: Elections Ontario

2014 Ontario general election
Party	Candidate	Votes	%	±%
Progressive Conservative	Ernie Hardeman	18,958	46.24	–8.63
New Democratic	Bryan Smith	10,573	25.79	+10.16
Liberal	Daniel Moulton	8,736	21.31	–3.69
Green	Mike Farlow	1,985	4.84	+1.29
Freedom	Tim Hodges	384	0.94	–
Libertarian	Devin Wright	365	0.89	–
Total valid votes		41,001	98.22	
Total rejected, unmarked and declined ballots		743	1.78	+1.45
Turnout		41,744	51.92	+2.74
Eligible voters		80,398		
Progressive Conservative hold		Swing		–9.39
Source: Elections Ontario

2011 Ontario general election
Party	Candidate	Votes	%	±%
Progressive Conservative	Ernie Hardeman	20,658	54.87	+7.60
Liberal	David Hilderley	9,410	24.99	–4.36
New Democratic	Dorothy Marie Eisen	5,885	15.63	+4.30
Green	Catherine Stewart-Mott	1,336	3.55	–5.27
Family Coalition	Leonard Vanderhoeven	359	0.95	–0.59
Total valid votes		37,648	99.67	
Total rejected, unmarked and declined ballots		123	0.33	–0.22
Turnout		37,771	49.18	–4.54
Eligible voters		76,804		
Progressive Conservative hold		Swing		+5.98
Source: Elections Ontario

2007 Ontario general election
Party	Candidate	Votes	%	±%
Progressive Conservative	Ernie Hardeman	18,445	47.27	+3.21
Liberal	Brian Jackson	11,455	29.36	–8.75
New Democratic	Mike Comeau	4,421	11.33	–1.23
Green	Tom Mayberry	3,441	8.82	+6.84
Independent	James Bender	659	1.69	–
Family Coalition	Leonard Vanderhoeven	601	1.54	–0.09
Total valid votes		39,022	99.46	
Total rejected, unmarked and declined ballots		213	0.54	–0.17
Turnout		39,235	53.72	–6.50
Eligible voters		73,040		
Progressive Conservative hold		Swing		+5.98
Source: Elections Ontario

2003 Ontario general election
Party	Candidate	Votes	%	±%
Progressive Conservative	Ernie Hardeman	18,656	44.06	–9.20
Liberal	Brian Brown	16,135	38.10	+2.58
New Democratic	Shawn Rouse	5,318	12.56	+5.35
Green	Tom Mayberry	838	1.98	–
Family Coalition	Andre De Decker	689	1.63	–0.42
Freedom	Paul Blair	404	0.95	+0.22
Libertarian	Kaye Sargent	306	0.72	–0.03
Total valid votes		42,346	99.28	
Total rejected, unmarked and declined ballots		306	0.72	–0.22
Turnout		42,652	60.22	–0.74
Eligible voters		70,827		
Progressive Conservative hold		Swing		–5.89
Source: Elections Ontario

1999 Ontario general election
Party	Candidate	Votes	%	±%
Progressive Conservative	Ernie Hardeman	22,726	53.25	+3.77
Liberal	Brian Brown	15,160	35.53	+17.04
New Democratic	Martin Donlevy	3,077	7.21	–19.55
Family Coalition	Andre De Decker	875	2.05	–0.94
Libertarian	Kaye Sargent	321	0.75	–0.34
Freedom	Paul Blair	312	0.73	+0.31
Natural Law	Jim Morris	203	0.48	–0.30
Total valid votes		42,674	99.06	
Total rejected, unmarked and declined ballots		405	0.94	+0.12
Turnout		43,079	60.96	–3.07
Eligible voters		70,670		
Progressive Conservative hold		Swing		–6.63
Source: Elections Ontario

1995 Ontario general election
Party	Candidate	Votes	%	±%
Progressive Conservative	Ernie Hardeman	17,568	49.48	+22.47
New Democratic	Kimble Sutherland	9,501	26.76	–7.99
Liberal	Bruce Sibbick	6,564	18.49	–8.36
Family Coalition	Case Van Blyderveen	1,061	2.99	–5.73
Libertarian	Kaye Sargent	386	1.09	–0.65
Natural Law	Jim Morris	275	0.77	–
Freedom	Jim Montag	148	0.42	–0.52
Total valid votes		35,503	99.18	
Total rejected, unmarked and declined ballots		295	0.82	–0.43
Turnout		35,798	64.02	–3.63
Eligible voters		55,914		
Progressive Conservative gain from New Democratic		Swing		+15.23
Source: Elections Ontario

1990 Ontario general election
Party	Candidate	Votes	%	±%
New Democratic	Kimble Sutherland	12,684	34.75	+16.13
Progressive Conservative	Jim Wilkins	9,860	27.01	–6.99
Liberal	Charlie Tatham	9,802	26.85	–15.25
Family Coalition	John L. Joosse	3,182	8.72	+4.74
Libertarian	Kaye Sargent	635	1.74	+0.43
Freedom	Joe Byway	341	0.93	–
Total valid votes		36,504	98.74	
Total rejected, unmarked and declined ballots		465	1.26	+0.79
Turnout		36,969	67.65	–0.53
Eligible voters		54,647		
New Democratic gain from Liberal		Swing		+15.69
Source: Elections Ontario

1987 Ontario general election
Party	Candidate	Votes	%	±%
Liberal	Charlie Tatham	14,939	42.10	+9.93
Progressive Conservative	Dick Treleaven	12,065	34.00	–12.81
New Democratic	Wayne Colbran	6,606	18.62	+1.53
Family Coalition	K. Margaret De Boer	1,410	3.97	–
Libertarian	Kaye Sargent	466	1.31	–0.89
Total valid votes		35,486	99.53	
Total rejected ballots		168	0.47	–0.22
Turnout		35,654	68.18	+7.56
Eligible voters		52,294		
Liberal gain from Progressive Conservative		Swing		+11.37
Source: Elections Ontario

1985 Ontario general election
Party	Candidate	Votes	%	±%
Progressive Conservative	Dick Treleaven	15,507	46.81	–3.06
Liberal	Charlotte Sutherland	10,656	32.17	–4.94
New Democratic	Wayne Colbran	5,660	17.08	+5.60
Libertarian	Kaye Sargent	729	2.20	+0.66
Independent	Rick Spurgeon	577	1.74	–
Total valid votes		33,129	99.31	
Total rejected ballots		231	0.69	+0.38
Turnout		33,360	60.62	–0.85
Eligible voters		55,035		
Progressive Conservative hold		Swing		+0.94
Source: Elections Ontario

1981 Ontario general election
Party	Candidate	Votes	%	±%
Progressive Conservative	Dick Treleaven	15,948	49.87	–1.11
Liberal	John Baird Finlay	11,866	37.10	+0.77
New Democratic	Wayne Colbran	3,673	11.49	–1.20
Libertarian	Kaye Sargent	493	1.54	–
Total valid votes		31,980	99.69	
Total rejected ballots		99	0.31	+0.03
Turnout		32,079	61.46	–7.71
Eligible voters		52,193		
Progressive Conservative hold		Swing		–0.94
Source: Elections Ontario

1977 Ontario general election
Party	Candidate	Votes	%	±%
Progressive Conservative	Harry Craig Parrott	17,758	50.98	+0.26
Liberal	John MacDonald	12,657	36.33	+0.40
New Democratic	Mike Casselman	4,420	12.69	–0.65
Total valid votes		34,835	99.72	
Total rejected ballots		97	0.28	–0.06
Turnout		34,932	69.17	–2.51
Eligible voters		50,501		
Progressive Conservative hold		Swing		–0.07
Source: Elections Ontario

1975 Ontario general election
Party	Candidate	Votes	%	±%
Progressive Conservative	Harry Craig Parrott	17,776	50.72	+4.71
Liberal	Alice Garner	12,595	35.94	–1.55
New Democratic	Peter Klynstra	4,676	13.34	–3.16
Total valid votes		35,047	99.66	
Total rejected ballots		118	0.34	+0.00
Turnout		35,165	71.68	–5.84
Eligible voters		49,055		
Progressive Conservative hold		Swing		+3.13
Source: Elections Ontario

1971 Ontario general election
Party	Candidate	Votes	%	±%
Progressive Conservative	Harry Craig Parrott	16,322	46.01	+6.58
Liberal	Gordon Innes	13,298	37.48	–6.87
New Democratic	George Knezic	5,856	16.51	+0.29
Total valid votes		35,476	99.67	
Total rejected ballots		118	0.33	–0.54
Turnout		35,594	77.52	+4.93
Eligible voters		45,916		
Progressive Conservative gain from Liberal		Swing		+6.72
Source: Elections Ontario

1967 Ontario general election
Party	Candidate	Votes	%	±%
Liberal	Gordon Innes	12,323	44.35	–0.47
Progressive Conservative	Gordon Pittock	10,955	39.43	–11.22
New Democratic	Stan Down	4,507	16.22	+11.69
Total valid votes		27,785	99.13	
Total rejected ballots		243	0.87	+0.12
Turnout		28,028	72.59	+2.72
Eligible voters		38,609		
Liberal gain from Progressive Conservative		Swing		+5.38
Source: Elections Ontario

1963 Ontario general election
Party	Candidate	Votes	%	±%
Progressive Conservative	Gordon Pittock	12,972	50.65	+4.16
Liberal	Gordon Innes	11,479	44.82	–2.57
New Democratic	Donald Morton	1,161	4.53	–1.59
Total valid votes		25,612	99.25	
Total rejected ballots		193	0.75	–0.19
Turnout		25,805	69.88	+1.23
Eligible voters		36,928		
Progressive Conservative gain from Liberal		Swing		+3.36
Source: Elections Ontario

1959 Ontario general election
Party	Candidate	Votes	%	±%
Liberal	Gordon Innes	11,414	47.39	–0.65
Progressive Conservative	Thomas Dent	11,198	46.49	+2.75
Co-operative Commonwealth	Charles Neve	1,475	6.12	–2.10
Total valid votes		24,087	99.06	
Total rejected ballots		228	0.94	–0.22
Turnout		24,315	68.65	–4.04
Eligible voters		35,421		
Liberal hold		Swing		–1.70
Source: Elections Ontario

1955 Ontario general election
Party	Candidate	Votes	%	±%
Liberal	Gordon Innes	11,781	48.03	+3.74
Progressive Conservative	Thomas Dent	10,728	43.74	–1.43
Co-operative Commonwealth	Lewis Watts	2,017	8.22	–2.31
Total valid votes		24,526	98.84	
Total rejected ballots		288	1.16	+0.33
Turnout		24,814	72.69	+4.53
Eligible voters		34,138		
Liberal gain from Progressive Conservative		Swing		+2.59
Source: Elections Ontario

1951 Ontario general election
Party	Candidate	Votes	%	±%
Progressive Conservative	Thomas Dent	10,026	45.17	–0.63
Liberal	Robert Rudy	9,830	44.29	+3.07
Co-operative Commonwealth	William F. Elsey	2,338	10.53	–2.43
Total valid votes		22,194	99.17	
Total rejected ballots		186	0.83	+0.07
Turnout		22,380	68.16	+6.45
Eligible voters		32,834		
Progressive Conservative hold		Swing		–1.85
Source: Elections Ontario

1948 Ontario general election
Party	Candidate	Votes	%	±%
Progressive Conservative	Thomas Dent	9,404	45.81	–4.24
Liberal	Frederick Lowes	8,463	41.22	+6.14
Co-operative Commonwealth	William Gordon Goodwin	2,662	12.97	–1.90
Total valid votes		20,529	99.24	
Total rejected ballots		158	0.76	+0.08
Turnout		20,687	61.71	–10.33
Eligible voters		33,522		
Progressive Conservative hold		Swing		–5.19
Source: Elections Ontario

1945 Ontario general election
Party	Candidate	Votes	%	±%
Progressive Conservative	Thomas Dent	11,402	50.05	+8.32
Liberal	E. G. McKenzie	7,994	35.09	+1.82
Co-operative Commonwealth	Frank E. Coburn	3,386	14.86	–10.14
Total valid votes		22,782	99.32	
Total rejected ballots		157	0.68	+0.02
Turnout		22,939	72.04	+14.13
Eligible voters		31,843		
Progressive Conservative hold		Swing		+3.25
Source: Elections Ontario

1943 Ontario general election
Party	Candidate	Votes	%	±%
Progressive Conservative	Thomas Dent	7,207	41.73	+0.25
Liberal	Patrick Michael Dewan	5,746	33.27	–20.57
Co-operative Commonwealth	Samuel Anson Innis	4,319	25.01	–
Total valid votes		17,272	99.34	
Total rejected ballots		115	0.66	–0.15
Turnout		17,387	57.91	–16.96
Eligible voters		30,025		
Progressive Conservative gain from Liberal		Swing		+10.41
Source: Elections Ontario

1937 Ontario general election
Party	Candidate	Votes	%	±%
Liberal	Patrick Michael Dewan	11,812	53.84	+3.73
Conservative	Thomas Dent	9,100	41.47	+1.89
Independent	William McNabb MacArthur	1,029	4.69	–
Total valid votes		21,941	99.19	
Total rejected ballots		179	0.81	+0.16
Turnout		22,120	74.87	–4.63
Eligible voters		29,544		
Liberal hold		Swing		+0.92
Source: Elections Ontario

1934 Ontario general election
Party	Candidate	Votes	%
Liberal	Patrick Michael Dewan	11,767	50.11
Conservative	John William Sales	9,295	39.58
Co-operative Commonwealth	Samuel Anson Innis	2,422	10.31
Total valid votes		23,484	99.35
Total rejected ballots		154	0.65
Turnout		23,638	79.50
Eligible voters		29,732	
Liberal pickup new district.			
Source: Elections Ontario

== 2007 electoral reform referendum ==
2007 Ontario electoral reform referendum
Side	Votes	
First Past the Post	25,059	66
Mixed member proportional	12,917	34
Total valid votes	37,976	100.0

== See also ==
- List of Ontario provincial electoral districts
- Canadian provincial electoral districts
