= Child and Parent Resource Institute =

Ontario children's mental health centre

- Abbreviation: CPRI
- Headquarters: 600 Sanatorium Road; London, Ontario, Canada
- Coordinates: 42.971685°N 81.334362°W
- Formerly called: Children's Psychiatric Research Institute

Child and Parent Resource Institute (CPRI) is a provincially operated, regional resource centre located in London, Ontario, Canada, providing services for children with special needs, including self-development and mental health disorders. CPRI is serviced and run by, the province of Ontario.

== Controversy ==
A class action lawsuit was brought against the Province of Ontario on behalf of individuals formerly admitted as inpatients to CPRI in London, Ontario. The action was certified as a class proceeding on December 22, 2016. The lawsuit included children admitted to CPRI as inpatients between September 1, 1963, and July 1, 2011, and was alive as of 2014, but excluded any time for which an individual was an inpatient and resided in the Glenhurst or Pratten 1 units.

The lawsuit alleged that between 1963 and 2011, the inpatients at CPRI suffered various harms, including physical and sexual abuse, which are covered under the settlement. Many youth said they were sexually abused in the bathrooms or in bed by staff or other patients. Of the settlement, CPRI states on its website, "The lawsuit alleged that between 1963 and 2011, the inpatients at CPRI suffered various harms, including injuries resulting from the wrongful acts of their peers, and that the Province owed a duty to supervise and failed to adequately ensure the safety of those individuals admitted. The Province denies these claims and a Court has not decided whether the Class or the Province is right. Instead, both sides have agreed to a settlement."

The Ontario government denied the allegations but agreed to settle out of court with the plaintiff at a last-minute mediation in March, just before a 12-week trial was set to begin. A Settlement Agreement was approved by the Ontario Superior Court of Justice on July 22, 2021. A copy of the Settlement Agreement can be viewed here.
