= George Henry Stokes (politician) =

Canadian politician

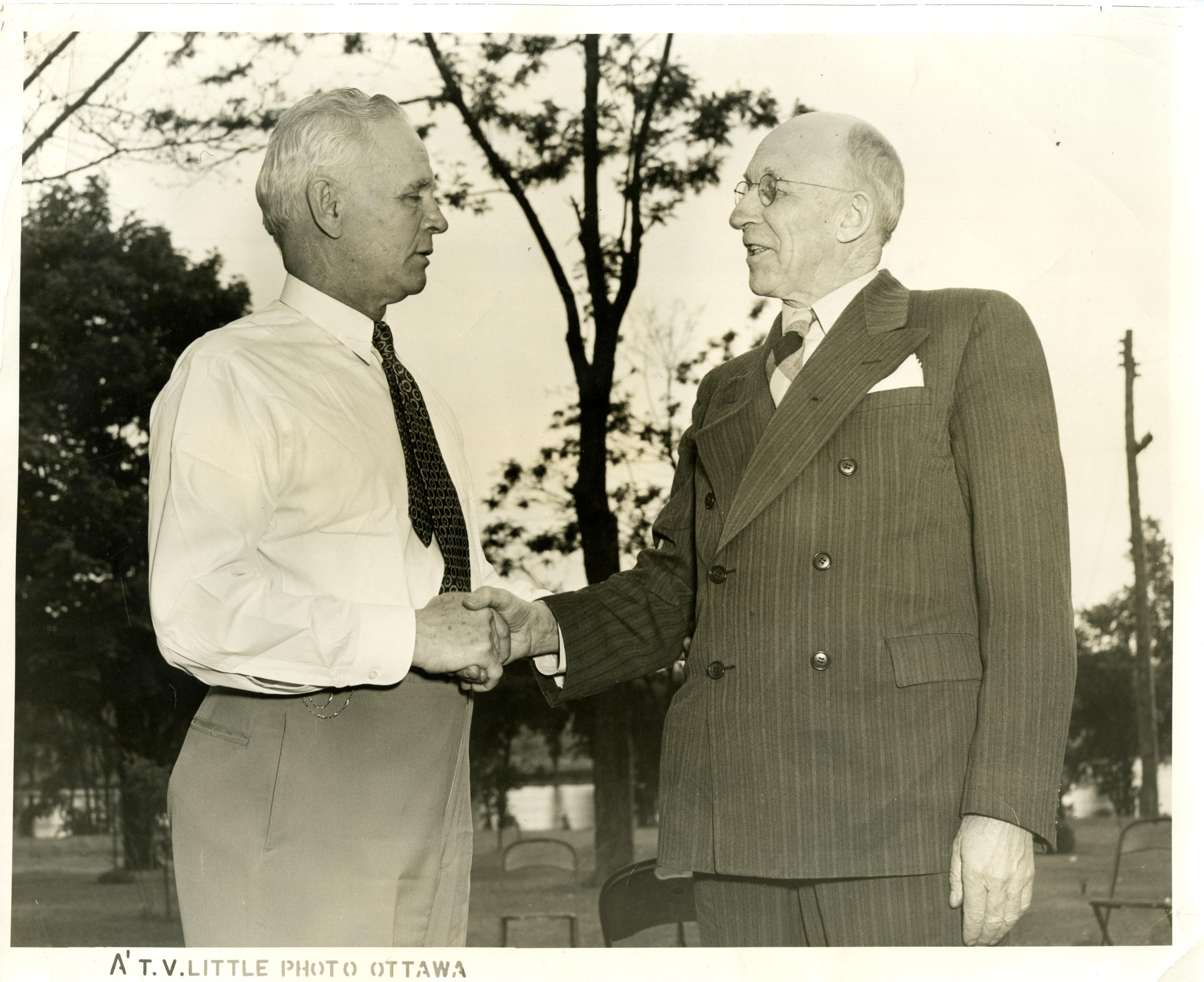
- Stokes (right) shaking hands with John Bracken in 1945

Member of Parliament for Hastings South
- In office March 1940 – April 1949
- Preceded by: Charles Alexander Cameron
- Succeeded by: Frank Follwell

Personal details
- Born: George Henry Stokes; 22 June 1876 Rawdon Township, Ontario, Canada
- Died: 19 April 1959 (aged 82)
- Party: National Government; Progressive Conservative
- Spouse(s): Florence Craig m. 22 February 1905
- Profession: breeder, farmer

George Henry Stokes (22 June 1876 – 19 April 1959) was a Canadian politician, breeder of Ayrshire cattle and a farmer by career. Stokes served as a National Government and Progressive Conservative party member of the House of Commons of Canada. He was born in Rawdon Township, Ontario.

He became the clerk for Hungerford Township from 1901 to 1915, then became the township's reeve from 1927 to 1931. He served as sheriff for Hastings County from 1931 until 1935.

He was first elected to Parliament at the Hastings South riding in the 1940 general election under the National Government party banner, then re-elected in 1945 general election as a Progressive Conservative. Stokes did not seek re-election in 1949 general election.
