= Grey South =

Grey South may refer to:

- Grey South (federal electoral district)
- Grey South (provincial electoral district)
