= Bob Temple =

Canadian politician (1926–1987)

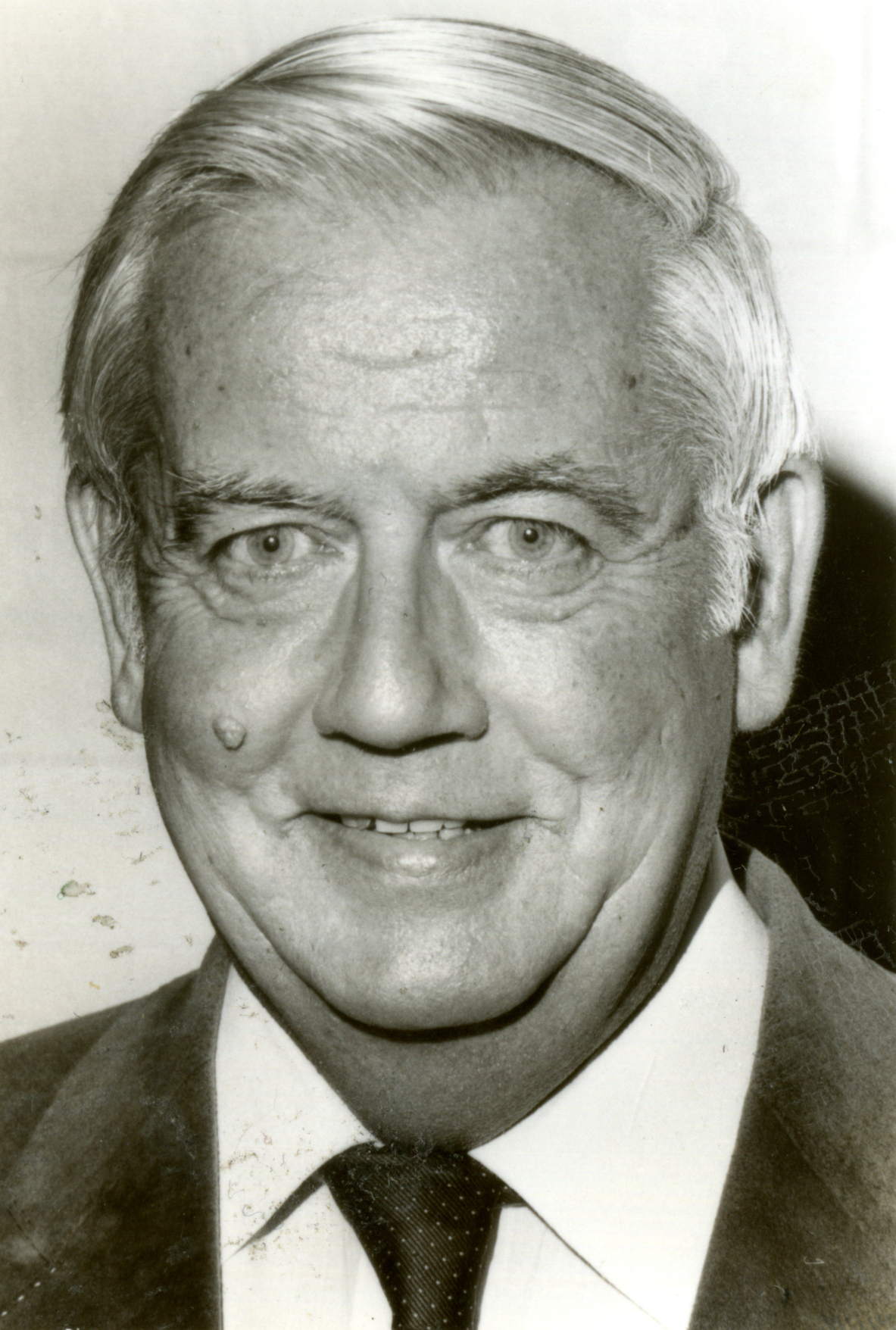
- Temple in 1985

Member of Parliament for Hastings South
- In office April 8, 1963 – November 7, 1965
- Preceded by: Lee Grills
- Succeeded by: Lee Grills

Personal details
- Born: Anthony Robert Temple; 8 October 1926 Belleville, Ontario, Canada
- Died: 7 July 1987 (aged 60)
- Party: Liberal
- Occupation: politician; lawyer

Anthony Robert Temple (8 October 1926 – 7 July 1987) was a Canadian lawyer and politician.

== Life and career ==
Temple was born in Belleville, Ontario on 8 October 1926. He was a lawyer by profession and an alderman in Belleville in the 1950s. Temple was the Liberal Party of Canada's candidate for the House of Commons of Canada in Hastings South throughout the 1960s. His first attempt to win a seat was in the 1962 federal election but he was elected in the 1963 federal election and served as a Member of Parliament for two years before being defeated in 1965. He attempted to regain his seat in the 1968 federal election but was unsuccessful.

Temple was also active in the Ontario Liberal Party and was a candidate in the 1954 Ontario Liberal leadership convention placing third of three candidates with 46 votes.

Temple died on 7 July 1987, at the age of 60.
