= 1954 Ontario Liberal Party leadership election =

Leadership election of the Ontario Liberal Party

- Date: 9 April 1954
- Convention: Royal York Hotel, Toronto, Ontario
- Resigning leader: Walter Thomson
- Won by: Farquhar Oliver
- Ballots: 1
- Candidates: 3

The 1954 Ontario Liberal leadership convention was held on 9 April 1954 at the Royal York Hotel in Toronto, Ontario, to elect a leader of the Ontario Liberal Party. Former party leader and Opposition leader Farquhar Oliver defeated Albert Wren and Bob Temple on the first ballot to succeed Walter Thomson as leader of the party.

== Background ==
The Ontario Liberal Party lost seats in both the 1948 and 1951 provincial elections, reducing its representation in the Legislative Assembly.

Walter Thomson succeeded Farquhar Oliver as party leader in 1950, but failed to win a seat in the 1951 Ontario general election. As a result, Oliver remained the party's parliamentary leader and principal spokesman in the Legislative Assembly despite no longer formally holding the party leadership.

As preparations began for the 1954 convention, Oliver and Liberal-Labour MPP Albert Wren emerged as the principal contenders for the leadership. Wren gained support in the days immediately preceding the convention, although Oliver remained the favourite because of his experience and prominence within the party.

== Candidates ==
=== Farquhar Oliver ===
Farquhar Oliver, Member of Provincial Parliament for Grey South, had previously served as Ontario Liberal leader from 1945 to 1950 and remained the party's parliamentary leader at the time of the convention.

Oliver had first been elected to the Legislative Assembly in 1926 as a member of the United Farmers of Ontario at the age of twenty-two. He was the last remaining UFO representative in the legislature when he formally joined the Ontario Liberal Party in 1941. He subsequently served in the governments of Mitchell Hepburn and Harry Nixon, including a term as Deputy Premier of Ontario.

=== Albert Wren ===
Albert Wren was the Liberal-Labour Member of Provincial Parliament for Kenora and represented a younger generation of Ontario Liberals.

Born in Fort William and raised in Ignace, Ontario, Wren served overseas as an officer in the Royal Canadian Air Force during the Second World War. Following the war, he worked as town clerk of Sioux Lookout before entering provincial politics. He was elected to the Legislative Assembly in 1951 after narrowly winning the Kenora constituency.

=== Bob Temple ===
Bob Temple was a Belleville lawyer and municipal politician. At thirty years of age, he was the youngest candidate in the contest. He was an outsider candidate who advocated a broad organizational rebuilding of the Ontario Liberal Party.

== Convention ==
The convention was held at Toronto's Royal York Hotel on 9 April 1954. Approximately 620 delegates participated.

The press described the gathering as subdued compared with earlier Ontario Liberal leadership conventions. Delegates heard speeches from all three candidates before proceeding to a single ballot.

Oliver won the leadership on the first ballot, receiving 412 votes to Wren's 162 and Temple's 46.

== Results ==
Candidate	Votes	%
Farquhar Oliver	412	66.5
Albert Wren	162	26.1
Bob Temple	46	7.4
Total	620	100.0

== Aftermath ==
Under Oliver's leadership, the Liberals contested the 1955 Ontario general election. Although the party modestly improved its representation, it remained far behind Frost's ruling Progressive Conservatives.

In 1957, Albert Wren and fellow Liberal MPP Arthur Reaume criticized Oliver's leadership and called for a new leadership convention. Both were expelled from the Liberal caucus. Oliver subsequently resigned, and the party held the 1958 leadership convention.
