= 1958 Ontario Liberal Party leadership election =

Canadian political party leadership election

- Date: April 20, 1958
- Convention: King Edward Hotel, Toronto, Ontario
- Resigning leader: Farquhar Oliver
- Won by: John Wintermeyer
- Ballots: 3
- Candidates: 7

The 1958 Ontario Liberal Party leadership convention was held on April 20, 1958, at the King Edward Hotel in Toronto to elect a successor to Farquhar Oliver as leader of the Ontario Liberal Party. John Wintermeyer, the Member of Provincial Parliament for Waterloo North, was elected on the third ballot, defeating former federal finance minister Walter Harris, who had led on the first ballot.

== Background ==
The Ontario Liberal Party had been out of government since the 1943 Ontario general election. Oliver, who had returned to the party leadership in 1954, resigned before the 1958 convention.

Seven candidates contested the leadership: Walter Harris, a former federal Minister of Finance in the government of Louis St. Laurent; John Wintermeyer, a Kitchener lawyer and MPP for Waterloo North since 1955; former federal MP Joe Greene; Vernon Singer, Reeve of North York; Ross Whicher, MPP for Bruce since 1955; Arthur Reaume, MPP for Essex North since 1951 and previously mayor of Windsor, Ontario; and Albert Wren, Liberal-Labour MPP for Kenora since 1951.

== Campaign ==
Harris entered the convention as the leading candidate. His principal rival was Wintermeyer.

Following the convention, an editorial in The Glengarry News criticized the influence of party insiders and expressed support for the role delegates had played in choosing the leader.

== Convention ==
The convention was held at Toronto's King Edward Hotel on April 20, 1958. Harris led the first ballot with 304 votes, followed by Wintermeyer with 264 and Greene with 88.

Following the first ballot, Wren was eliminated and endorsed Wintermeyer. Whicher and Reaume withdrew and directed their delegates to support Wintermeyer. Wintermeyer moved ahead of Harris on the second ballot.

Contemporary reporting described the movement of delegates from other candidates to Wintermeyer as a "Stop Walter Harris" effort among delegates opposed to Harris's candidacy.

Wintermeyer increased his lead on the third ballot and was elected leader. Contemporary reports described the convention as having a record turnout of 761 voting delegates.

== Results ==
Delegate support by ballot
Candidate	1st ballot		2nd ballot		3rd ballot	
Candidate	Votes	%	Votes	%	Votes	%
John Wintermeyer	264	34.2	369	46.8	398	53.3
Walter Harris	304	39.3	354	44.9	349	46.7
Joe Greene	88	11.4	45	5.7	14	1.9
Vernon Singer	43	5.6	21	2.7		
Ross Whicher	39	5.0				
Arthur Reaume	32	4.1				
Albert Wren	7	0.9				
Total	777	100.0	789	100.0	747	100.0

== Aftermath ==
Following his election, Wintermeyer called a caucus meeting to prepare for upcoming provincial by-elections and begin developing the party's platform.

In the 1959 Ontario general election, the Liberals increased their representation from 10 to 21 seats. Premier Leslie Frost's Progressive Conservatives retained their majority government.

The convention was subsequently discussed in Maclean's as an example of a delegated leadership election in which the candidate leading on the first ballot did not win the leadership.
