= Walter Edward Harris =

Canadian politician

The Honourable Walter Harris PC QC DCL
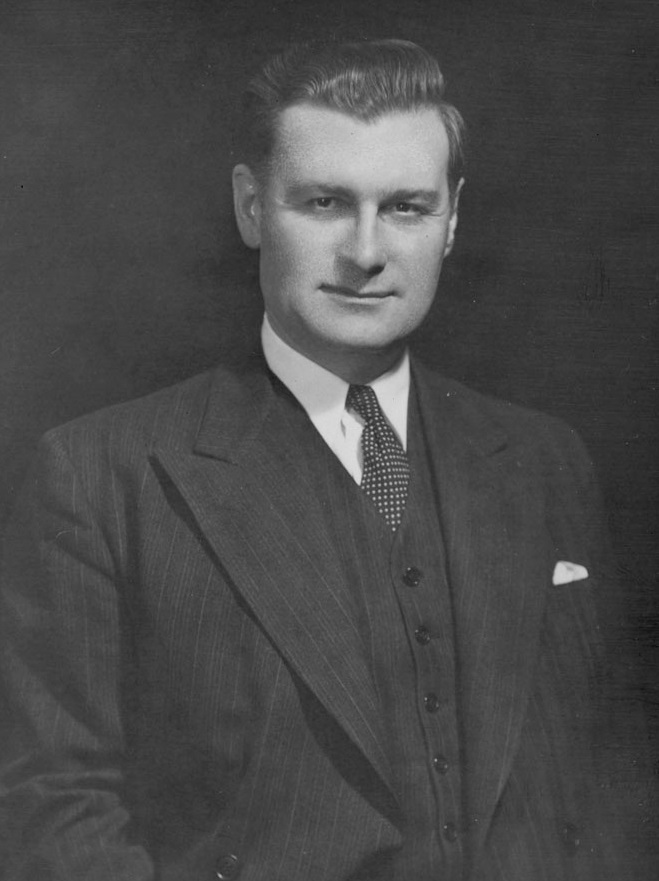

Minister of Finance
- In office 1 July 1954 – 20 June 1957
- Prime Minister: Louis St. Laurent
- Preceded by: Douglas Abbott
- Succeeded by: Donald Fleming

Leader of the Government in the House of Commons
- In office 9 May 1953 – 12 April 1957
- Prime Minister: Louis St. Laurent
- Preceded by: Alphonse Fournier
- Succeeded by: Howard Charles Green

Minister of Citizenship and Immigration
- In office 18 January 1950 – 30 June 1954
- Prime Minister: Louis St. Laurent
- Preceded by: Position created
- Succeeded by: Jack Pickersgill

Minister of Public Works
- Acting; 12 June 1953 – 16 September 1953
- Prime Minister: Louis St. Laurent
- Preceded by: Alphonse Fournier
- Succeeded by: Robert Winters

Member of Parliament for Grey—Bruce
- In office 26 March 1940 – 9 June 1957
- Preceded by: Agnes Macphail
- Succeeded by: Eric Winkler

Personal details
- Born: Walter Edward Harris; 14 January 1904 Kimberley, Ontario, Canada
- Died: 10 January 1999 (aged 94)
- Party: Liberal
- Spouse: Grace Elma Morrison
- Children: 3
- Profession: Barrister; Lawyer

Walter Edward Harris PC QC DCL (14 January 1904 – 10 January 1999) was a Canadian politician and lawyer.

Harris was first elected to the House of Commons of Canada as the Liberal Member of Parliament (MP) for the Ontario riding of Grey-Bruce in the 1940 election by defeating Agnes MacPhail. Despite being a newly-elected MP, he enlisted in the military, served for four years, and saw action in France during World War II.

He served as parliamentary secretary to Louis St. Laurent when he was Secretary of State for External Affairs in the Mackenzie King cabinet. He continued as parliamentary secretary to St. Laurent when he became Prime Minister of Canada in 1948 to 1950, when St. Laurent brought Harris into the Canadian Cabinet.

Harris served as Minister of Citizenship and Immigration until 1954, when he was promoted to Minister of Finance. He was Finance Minister during a period of great economic growth. During his term of office, he introduced the regulations permitting Registered Retirement Savings Plans, which have become a staple of the financial planning of millions of Canadians.

Before his 1956 budget speech, a journalist from the Montreal Gazette played a joke on a colleague from La Presse by pretending that he had received an advance copy of the budget by mistake. Harris was informed of that and began to draft a letter of resignation until he was informed that the whole story was a prank.

Harris also served as Government House Leader from 1953 to 1957 and thus had to try to manage the government's dealings on the floor of the House of Commons during the 1956 Pipeline Debate. The government imposed closure on debate resulting in an outraged parliamentary opposition that complained of "tyranny" and public complaints that the government was acting in an arrogant manner. Harris became a casualty and lost his seat in the 1957 election that brought John Diefenbaker to power.

In 1958, he attempted a move to provincial politics and ran for the leadership of the Ontario Liberal Party. He led on the first ballot of the 1958 Ontario Liberal Party leadership convention but was defeated by fewer than fifty votes by John Wintermeyer on the third ballot. Following his defeat, Harris retired from politics and returned to his law practice. He was also president and later chairman of Victoria and Grey Trust.

== Heritage ==
The public library in Markdale, Ontario, is named after Walter Harris. There is also a school named after him in Oshawa, Ontario that is part of the Durham District School Board and offers French Immersion.

There is a Walter Harris fonds at Library and Archives Canada.

Parliament of Canada
Preceded by Agnes MacPhail	MP for Grey—Bruce, ON; 1940–1957	Succeeded by Eric Alfred Winkler
