= Grey East (provincial electoral district) =

Ontario electoral district

Defunct provincial electoral district
- Legislature: Legislative Assembly of Ontario
- District created: 1874
- District abolished: 1925
- First contested: 1875
- Last contested: 1923

Grey East was an electoral riding in Ontario, Canada. It was created in 1875 for eastern portions of Grey North and Grey South. It was renamed and redistributed in 1886 as the riding of Grey Centre before being abolished in 1925 before the 1926 election.

== Members of Provincial Parliament ==
Grey East
Assembly	Years	Member	Party
3rd	1875–1879	Abram William Lauder	Conservative
4th	1879–1883	Abram William Lauder	Conservative
5th	1883–1884	Abram William Lauder	Conservative
5th	1884–1886	Neil McColman	Conservative
Riding renamed to Grey Centre in 1886
6th	1886–1890	Joseph Rorke	Conservative
7th	1890–1894	Joseph Rorke	Conservative
8th	1894–1898	Thomas Gamey	Patron-PPA
9th	1898–1919	Isaac Benson Lucas	Conservative
10th	1902–1905	Isaac Benson Lucas	Conservative
11th	1905–1908	Isaac Benson Lucas	Conservative
12th	1908–1911	Isaac Benson Lucas	Conservative
13th	1911–1914	Isaac Benson Lucas	Conservative
14th	1914–1919	Isaac Benson Lucas	Conservative
15th	1919–1923	Dougall Carmichael	United Farmers
16th	1923–1926	Dougall Carmichael	United Farmers
Sourced from the Ontario Legislative Assembly
Merged into Grey North and Grey South ridings after 1925

== Election results ==
1923 Ontario general election: Grey Centre
Party	Candidate	Votes	%	±%
United Farmers	Dougall Carmichael	3,636	50.52	–2.35
Conservative	Angus Ego	3,561	49.48	+2.35
Total valid votes		7,197	99.45	
Total rejected ballots		40	0.55	–1.57
Turnout		7,237	65.32	–15.25
Eligible voters		11,079		
United Farmers hold		Swing		–2.35
Source: Elections Ontario

1919 Ontario general election: Grey Centre
Party	Candidate	Votes	%	±%
United Farmers	Dougall Carmichael	4,363	52.87	–
Conservative	Isaac Benson Lucas	3,889	47.13	–14.34
Total valid votes		8,252	97.88	
Total rejected ballots		179	2.12	+1.79
Turnout		8,431	80.57	+7.46
Eligible voters		10,464		
United Farmers gain from Conservative		Swing		–
Source: Elections Ontario

1914 Ontario general election: Grey Centre
Party	Candidate	Votes	%	±%
Conservative	Isaac Benson Lucas	2,404	61.47	–6.43
Liberal	George G. Albery	1,507	38.53	+6.43
Total valid votes		3,911	99.67	
Total rejected ballots		13	0.33	–
Turnout		3,924	73.11	–
Eligible voters		5,367		
Conservative hold		Swing		–6.43
Source: Elections Ontario

Ontario provincial by-election, June 2, 1913: Grey Centre Ministerial By-election
Party	Candidate	Votes
Conservative	Isaac Benson Lucas	acclaimed
Source: Elections Ontario

1911 Ontario general election: Grey Centre
Party	Candidate	Votes	%	±%
Conservative	Isaac Benson Lucas	2,223	67.90	+3.36
Liberal	Patrick McCullough	1,051	32.10	–3.36
Total valid votes		3,274	99.63	
Total rejected ballots		12	0.37	–0.03
Turnout		3,286	54.31	–8.24
Eligible voters		6,051		
Conservative hold		Swing		+3.36
Source: Elections Ontario

1908 Ontario general election: Grey Centre
Party	Candidate	Votes	%	±%
Conservative	Isaac Benson Lucas	2,253	64.54	–5.57
Liberal	Patrick McCullough	1,238	35.46	+5.57
Total valid votes		3,491	99.60	
Total rejected ballots		14	0.40	+0.27
Turnout		3,505	62.54	+11.92
Eligible voters		5,604		
Conservative hold		Swing		–5.57
Source: Elections Ontario

1905 Ontario general election: Grey Centre
Party	Candidate	Votes	%	±%
Conservative	Isaac Benson Lucas	2,160	70.11	+12.23
Liberal	D. Gillies	921	29.89	–12.23
Total valid votes		3,081	99.87	
Total rejected ballots		4	0.13	–
Turnout		3,085	50.62	–
Eligible voters		6,094		
Conservative hold		Swing		+12.23
Source: Elections Ontario

1902 Ontario general election: Grey Centre
Party	Candidate	Votes
Conservative	Isaac Benson Lucas	acclaimed
Source: Elections Ontario

1898 Ontario general election: Grey Centre
Party	Candidate	Votes	%	±%
Conservative	Isaac Benson Lucas	2,813	58.58	–
Liberal	J. Boland	1,722	35.86	+7.87
Independent	John B. Davis	267	5.56	–
Total valid votes		4,802	99.34	
Total rejected ballots		32	0.66	+0.39
Turnout		4,834	73.97	+6.64
Eligible voters		6,535		
Conservative gain from Protestant Protective		Swing		–
Source: Elections Ontario

1894 Ontario general election: Grey Centre
Party	Candidate	Votes	%	±%
Protestant Protective	Thomas Gamey	1,735	42.67	–
Conservative-Protestant Protective	Joseph Rorke	1,193	29.34	–23.14
Liberal	Clayton Webb Hartman	1,138	27.99	–19.53
Total valid votes		4,066	99.73	
Total rejected ballots		11	0.27	–0.14
Turnout		4,077	67.33	+18.57
Eligible voters		6,055		
Protestant Protective gain from Conservative		Swing		+11.57
Source: Elections Ontario

1890 Ontario general election: Grey Centre
Party	Candidate	Votes	%	±%
Conservative	Joseph Rorke	1,513	52.48	–6.57
Liberal	Mr. Hunt	1,370	47.52	+6.57
Total valid votes		2,883	99.59	
Total rejected ballots		12	0.41	–0.24
Turnout		2,895	48.76	–10.30
Eligible voters		5,937		
Conservative hold		Swing		–6.57
Source: Elections Ontario

1886 Ontario general election: Grey Centre
Party	Candidate	Votes	%	±%
Conservative	Joseph Rorke	1,485	44.29	–
Liberal	W. Brown	1,373	40.95	–
Conservative	Neil McColman	495	14.76	–
Total valid votes		3,353	99.35	
Total rejected ballots		22	0.65	–
Turnout		3,375	59.07	–
Eligible voters		5,714		
Conservative hold		Swing		–
Source: Elections Ontario

Ontario provincial by-election, March 18, 1884 Death of Abram William Lauder
Party	Candidate	Votes	%	±%
Conservative	Neil McColman	1,540	62.47	+9.62
Independent	Mr. Myles	925	37.53	–9.62
Total valid votes		2,465	100.00	
Total rejected ballots		–		
Turnout		2,465	–	–
Eligible voters				
Conservative hold		Swing		+9.62
Source: Elections Ontario

1883 Ontario general election
Party	Candidate	Votes	%	±%
Conservative	Abram William Lauder	1,548	52.85	–15.81
Independent	Mr. Myles	1,381	47.15	+15.81
Total valid votes		2,929	98.95	
Total rejected ballots		31	1.05	+1.05
Turnout		2,960	62.00	+12.37
Eligible voters		4,774		
Conservative hold		Swing		–15.81
Source: Elections Ontario

1879 Ontario general election
Party	Candidate	Votes	%	±%
Conservative	Abram William Lauder	1,294	55.70	−11.85
Independent	Mr. Myles	728	31.34	
Conservative	Joseph Rorke	301	12.96	
Total valid votes		2,323	49.64	−3.79
Eligible voters		4,680		
Conservative hold		Swing		−11.85
Source: Elections Ontario

1875 Ontario general election
Party	Candidate	Votes	%
Conservative	Abram William Lauder	1,297	67.55
Liberal	W. Brown	623	32.45
Turnout		1,920	53.42
Eligible voters		3,594	
Conservative pickup new district.			
Source: Elections Ontario
