= Maria Elise Turner Lauder =

Canadian author (1833–1922)

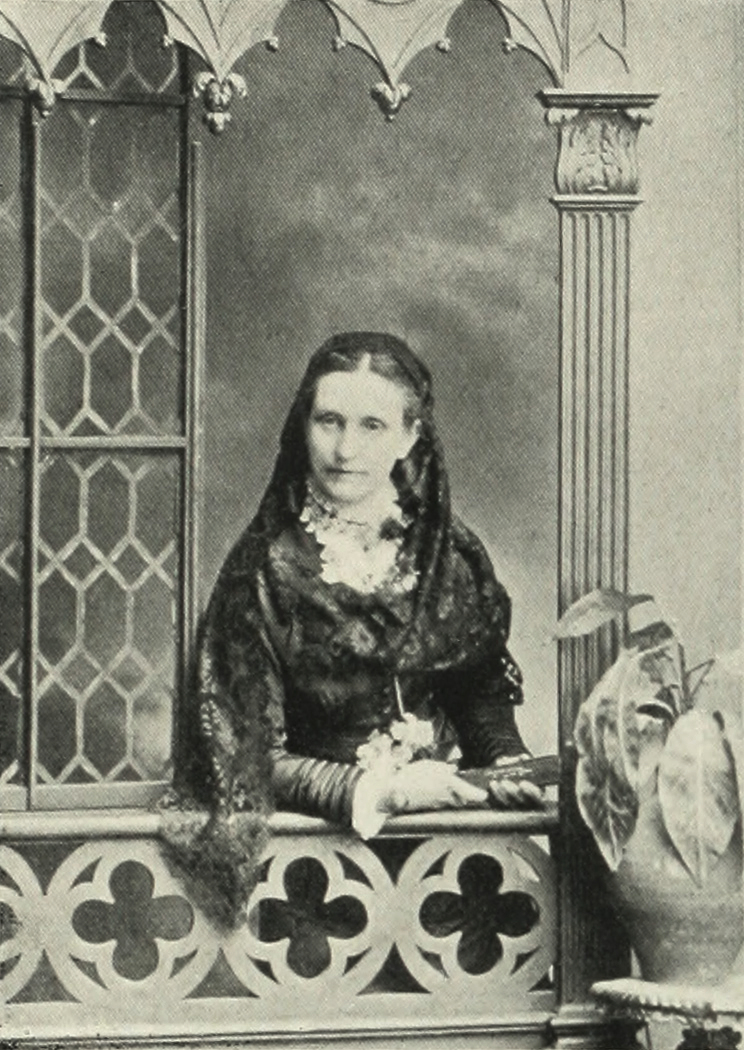
- Lauder c. 1893
- Born: Maria Elise Turner Toof; 20 February 1833; Saint-Armand, Lower Canada (Note: According to Simon Fraser University, Lauder may have been born in Vermont, United States.)
- Died: 1 June 1922 (aged 89); Toronto, Ontario, Canada
- Education: Oberlin College
- Occupations: Teacher; linguist; writer; philanthropist
- Spouse: Abram William Lauder (m. 1856; died 1884)
- Children: William Waugh Lauder
- Writing career
- Pen name: Toofie Lauder
- Language: English
- Genre: Travel writer

Maria Elise Turner Lauder (known by the pen name Toofie Lauder, also known as Maria Elise Turner de Touffe Lauder and Maria Elise T. T. Lauder; 20 February 1833 – 1 June 1922) was a Canadian teacher, linguist, and author who travelled extensively in Europe. She published novels and poetry, but mostly was known for writing about her travels. Lauder was also a philanthropist, involved in the temperance movement.

She was the author of My First Visit to England, 1865; In Europe, 1877; Evergreen Leaves: Being Notes from My Travel Book. Belford, 1877; Evergreen Leaves: Or, "Toofie" in Europe, 1884; Legends and Tales of the Harz Mountains, North Germany, 1885; and At Last, 1894. She also wrote song lyrics including, "Britain, We Stand by You", 1899; "The Last Night and its Vision", 1901; "Birdie's Reply : To a Wee Bird Trying to Fly", 1907; and "Alone - The Queen's Lament", 1908.

== Early life and education ==
Maria (or, "Marie") Elise Turner Toof (or, "de Touffe") (nickname "Toofie"), was born in Saint-Armand, Lower Canada (now Quebec), on 20 February 1833. Lauder was of Norman and Huguenot descent, her ancestors having escaped from France to Germany at the time of the Revocation of the Edict of Nantes. Her father was Whitcomb Powers Toof (or Whitcombe de Touffe) (d. 1836), and her mother was Phoebe Harriet Perry (1807–1875), who descended from United Empire Loyalists family of Vermont.

Lauder's father died in 1836. Two years later, her mother married Rodolphus Fuller Grote (1809–1888). There were five half-siblings from this marriage: George Whitfield Grote (1843–1920), lawyer and poet who authored "Ode on the coronation of King Edward VII" (1901); Phoebe Agnes Robina (Grote) Copeland (1849–1932), poet; Gorham Whitcombe Grote, a doctor; John Wesley Grote (1845-1898), an insurance agent; and Lorenzo Perry Grote (1852–1869).

Lauder studied in Oberlin College, Ohio, as women were not then admitted to the University of Toronto. She studied theology there for two years under Charles Grandison Finney, graduating with honours.

== Career ==
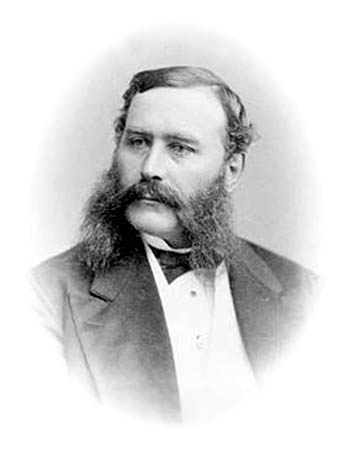
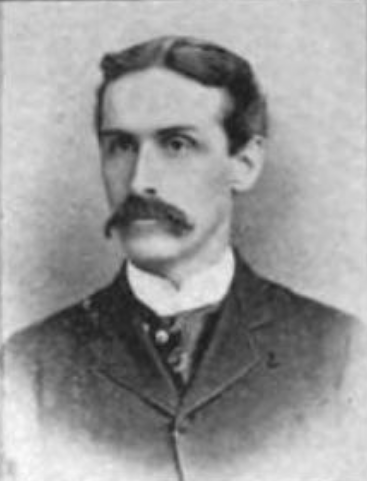
Her husband, Abram Lauder, and son, William Lauder

Lauder was a fair linguist, as she added a knowledge of Latin and Greek in addition to several modern languages, the latter of which she spoke fluently. After completing her education, she worked as a linguist, and taught at Whitby Ladies' College, in Whitby, Ontario.

She married Abram William Lauder, a teacher, in 1856 and they moved to Toronto where he studied law. He became a prominent barrister in that city, affiliating with the Conservative Party, and serving for several years as a member of the Ontario Legislature. During this time, she became a philanthropist and member of the Woman's Christian Temperance Union (WCTU) movement.

The Lauders had one child, the pianist, William Waugh Lauder, for whom she was the sole teacher until he was eleven years old in 1869. She became obliged to assume the entire direction of her child's musical education. For this, she travelled extensively, residing in Great Britain, Germany, France and Italy, and visiting many parts of Europe, accompanied by her husband and son. During her residence abroad, she formed the friendship of several musical celebrities and authors, and, armed with an introductory letter from the widely-known author and musical critic, Oscar Paul, of the Royal Conservatorium der Musik in Leipzig, she took William to Sachse-Weimar, where he studied with Franz Liszt. According to Pauline Pocknell, William was the only Canadian pupil of Liszt. At the invitation of Liszt, Lauder took William to perform in Rome. There, she was presented at the royal court to Umberto I and Queen Margherita, and was honoured with private audiences with the queen, and invitations, both in the Quirinal Palace and the Palace of Capodimonte in Naples. Lauder was also presented, with her son, at the papal court to Pope Leo XIII. Extensive travel was the inspiration for Lauder to publish various books, including My First Visit to England (1865) and In Europe (Toronto, 1877).

Enthused after spending time in the Harz in summer, she collected material on local folk tales with the help of German novelist Gustav Freytag and wrote Legends and Tales of the Harz Mountains in Germany, published by Hodder & Stoughton. The 1881 work was dedicated to Queen Margherita, who presented Lauder with her royal autographed portrait. Of this book, The Westminster Review stated:

Lovers of old German stories will thank 'Toofie Lauder' heartily for having collected together so charming a volume of Legends and Tales of the Hartz Mountains. Whether the name 'Toofie Lauder' signifies a lady or a gentleman we have no means of guessing, but we should fancy that the graceful style of the book comes from a woman’s pen.

"Toofie" was Lauder's pen name; she published many literary articles and poems using it, as well as a number of volumes of poetry. "Toofie" was also a fictional character in at least one of Lauder's works.

She wrote a tribute poem upon the death of Empress Elisabeth of Austria, as well as poems honoring Queen Victoria, King Edward, and King George. She also wrote lyrics for several songs, including "Britain, We Stand by You", "The Last Night and its Vision, "Birdie's Reply : To a Wee Bird Trying to Fly", music by Arthur Uvedale, and "Alone - The Queen's Lament".

== Personal life ==
Lauder was an amateur musician. A Methodist in religious affiliation, she was a co-founder of the Metropolitan Methodist Church, a historic Neo-Gothic style building in downtown Toronto; it is one of the largest and most prominent churches of the United Church of Canada.

She died in Toronto, on 1 June 1922 at age 89, after a brief illness.

== Selected works ==
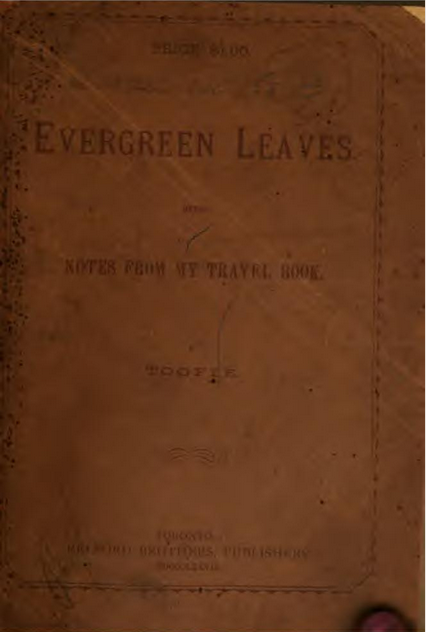
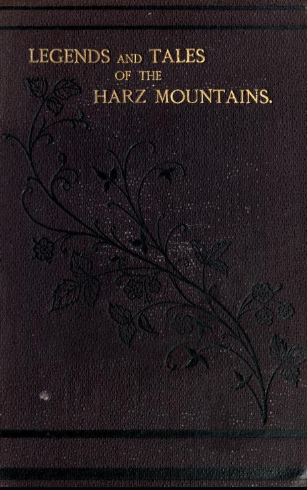
Covers of Evergreen Leaves: Being Notes from My Travel Book and Legends and tales of the Harz Mountains, North Germany

=== Books ===
- My First Visit to England. 1865.
- In Europe. 1877.
- Evergreen Leaves: Being Notes from My Travel Book. Belford. 1877. OCLC 681417843.
- Evergreen Leaves: Or, "Toofie" in Europe. 1884. OCLC 271435912.
- Legends and Tales of the Harz Mountains, North Germany. 1885. ISBN 9780665586132. OCLC 890752616.
- At Last. 1894. ISBN 9780665088926. OCLC 890754209.

=== Song lyrics ===
- "Britain, We Stand by You", 1899.
- "The Last Night and its Vision". Methodist Magazine and Review'. 53 (3): 244. March 1901.
- "Birdie's Reply : To a Wee Bird Trying to Fly", music by Arthur Uvedale, 1907. OCLC 1007594208
- "Alone - The Queen's Lament", 1908. OCLC 1007622708
