= David McNicol =

David McNicol may refer to:

- David McNicol (diplomat) (1913–2001), Australian diplomat
- David McNicol (politician) (1833–?), Canadian politician
