= Isaac Benson Lucas =

Canadian politician

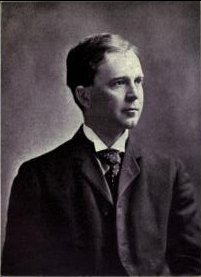

Ontario MPP
- In office 1898–1919
- Preceded by: Thomas Gamey
- Succeeded by: Dougall Carmichael
- Constituency: Grey Centre

Personal details
- Born: September 19, 1867 Warwick Township, Lambton County, Ontario, Canada
- Died: March 8, 1940 (aged 72) Toronto, Ontario, Canada
- Party: Conservative
- Spouse(s): Elizabeth E. Richardson, Edith Jane Trees
- Children: 1
- Occupation: Lawyer

Isaac Benson Lucas, KC (September 19, 1867 – March 8, 1940) was a Canadian lawyer and politician. He served as a Conservative Member of the Legislative Assembly of Ontario for Grey Centre from 1898 to 1919.

Lucas was born in Warwick Township, Lambton County, the son of George Lucas, who had come to Canada from Ireland. He was educated in Strathroy and at the University of Toronto. He graduated from Osgoode Hall in 1899 and entered practice in Owen Sound, later moving to Markdale. He married Elizabeth E. Richardson, the daughter of Matthew Kendal Richardson. In 1908, he was named King's Counsel. He served one of the shortest terms as provincial treasurer, serving from 1913 to 1914. Lucas was Attorney General from 1914 to 1919. During his time in office, Lucas was responsible for steering the Workmen's Compensation Act through the provincial legislature. He also served as government representative on the Hydro-Electric Commission and helped promote the development of a park in the area surrounding the Horseshoe Falls at Niagara.

He died in Toronto, Ontario in 1940.

Political offices
Preceded by Arthur Matheson	Treasurer of Ontario; 1913-1914	Succeeded by Thomas McGarry
