= Oscar Paul =

German musicologist, music writer, critic and teacher (1836–1898)

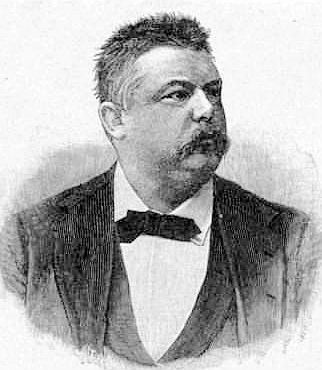
Oscar Paul

Oscar Paul (8 April 1836 – 18 April 1898) was a German musicologist and a music writer, critic, and teacher.

== Biography ==
Oscar Paul was born in Freiwaldau in Silesia (now Gozdnica in the Województwo lubuskie of the Poland). He went to school in Görlitz, and studied under Louis Plaidy, Ernst Richter and Moritz Hauptmann at the University of Music and Theatre Leipzig. He commenced a career as a pianist, but soon found himself unsuited to it.

After spending time in different German towns, he returned to Leipzig in 1866 to give private lessons in harmony. In 1869 he became a teacher at the Leipzig Conservatory, and in 1872 a professor at the university. His students included: Felix Weingartner, Leoš Janáček, Fanny Davies, Cornelis Dopper, Alfred Hill, Hans Huber, Ferdinand Pfohl, Anna Diller Starbuck, Theodore Baker, W. Waugh Lauder (the only Canadian student of Franz Liszt), Rudolf Breithaupt, Johannes Gelbker, Emil Kronke, Heinrich Ordenstein, Albert Ross Parsons, and Otto Schweizer.

He died in 1898 at the age of 62.

== Writing ==
In 1866 Paul published Die absolute Harmonik der Griechen. He edited Hauptmann's Lehre von der Harmonik (1868), and wrote Geschichte des Klaviers (1869) and Handlexikon der Tonkunst (1871–72). In 1872, he produced his magnum opus, his translation and elucidation of the five-volume work De institutione musica by Boethius. His Lehrbuch der Harmonik came out in 1880.

Paul was a contributor to the Niederrheinische Musik-Zeitung (1853–1867). He founded and edited the periodical Tonhalle which was merged into Musikalisches Wochenblatt, which he also edited. He was the music critic of the Leipziger Tagblatt for many years.
