= Thomas Gamey =

Ontario politician and farmer

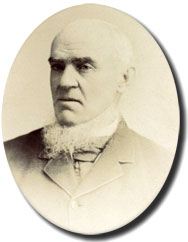

Ontario MPP
- In office 1894–1898
- Preceded by: Joseph Rorke
- Succeeded by: Isaac Benson Lucas
- Constituency: Grey Centre

Personal details
- Born: c. 1825 County Tyrone, Ireland
- Died: 1898 (aged 72–73)
- Party: Patrons of Industry-Protestant Protective Association

Thomas Gamey (c. 1825 – February 20, 1898) was an Irish-born Ontario farmer and political figure. He represented Grey Centre in the Legislative Assembly of Ontario from 1894 to 1898 as a Patrons of Industry-Protestant Protective Association member.

He was born in County Tyrone, Ireland, the son of Thomas Gamey, and came to Upper Canada with his family in 1834. He served thirty-three years as reeve for Osprey Township (1857–1859, 1861–1869, 1871–1875, 1879–1880, 1884–1885, 1889-1894) and was also warden for Grey County (1866). Gamey was a justice of the peace.
