= Ron Lipsett =

Canadian politician

Ontario MPP
- In office 1987–1990
- Preceded by: Bob McKessock
- Succeeded by: Bill Murdoch
- Constituency: Grey

Personal details
- Born: January 19, 1944 (age 82) Meaford, Ontario
- Party: Liberal
- Occupation: Business executive, farmer

Ronald F. Lipsett (born January 19, 1944) is a former politician in Ontario, Canada. He was a Liberal member of the Legislative Assembly of Ontario from 1987 to 1990 who represented the central Ontario riding of Grey.

== Background ==
Lipsett was educated at the University of Western Ontario. He is a fifth-generation cattle farmer in Silcote Corner, near Owen Sound, Ontario. He served as a trustee on the Grey County Board of Education, and a director of Formosa Mutual Insurance Company.

== Politics ==
He was elected to the Ontario legislature in the 1987 provincial election, defeating Progressive Conservative Bill Murdoch by about 2,000 votes in the riding of Grey. Lipsett was a backbench supporter of David Peterson's government during his time in the legislature. He was a parliamentary assistant to the Minister of Energy in 1989–90.

The Liberals were defeated in the 1990 election, and Lipsett placed third against Murdoch and NDP candidate Peggy Hutchinson in his bid for re-election.

== Later life ==
Lipsett returned to the Formosa Mutual Insurance Company (later renamed Trillium Mutual Insurance) after his defeat, and has been marketing manager since 1991. He oversees advertising and sponsorship programs in the company.
