= Joseph Rorke =

Canadian politician

Ontario MPP
- In office 1886–1894
- Preceded by: New riding
- Succeeded by: Thomas Gamey
- Constituency: Grey Centre

Personal details
- Born: April 26, 1832 Tecumseh Township, Simcoe County, Upper Canada
- Died: April 11, 1907 (aged 74) Collingwood, Ontario
- Party: Conservative
- Spouse: Jennie Morton (m. 1888)
- Occupation: Businessman

Joseph Rorke (April 26, 1832 – April 11, 1907) was an Ontario businessman and political figure. He represented Grey Centre in the Legislative Assembly of Ontario as a Conservative member from 1886 to 1894.

He was born in Tecumseh Township, Simcoe County, Upper Canada in 1832, the son of Richard Rorke, an immigrant from Ireland. He moved with his family to Collingwood Township in 1848. Rorke worked on his father's farm and taught school. In 1859, he was appointed a justice of the peace. From 1860 to 1864, he worked as an accountant for merchants in Clarksburg. Rorke married Susan Donaldson in 1867 and was named a notary public that same year. He served in the local militia, first as captain and then lieutenant. Rorke was reeve for Collingwood Township from 1873 to 1878 and served as warden for Grey County in 1876. He was a member of the board of directors for the North Grey and Northern Extension Railways. He was a district and county master for the Orange Lodge and a member of the Freemasons. He ran unsuccessfully for a seat in the provincial legislature in 1879. In 1888, he married Jennie Morton after the death of his first wife. He died at Collingwood, Ontario in 1907.
