= Bob McKessock =

Canadian politician

Ontario MPP
- In office 1975–1987
- Preceded by: Eric Winkler
- Succeeded by: Ron Lipsett
- Constituency: Grey

Personal details
- Born: February 2, 1933 (age 93) Chatsworth, Ontario
- Party: Liberal
- Occupation: Church deacon, farmer

Robert Carson McKessock (born February 2, 1933) is a former politician in Ontario, Canada. He served in the Legislative Assembly of Ontario from 1975 to 1987, as a member of the Liberal Party.

== Background ==
McKessock was born in Chatsworth, Ontario and educated at Georgian College. He worked as a farmer, and was a deacon in the Strathaven Baptist Church.

== Politics ==
He was elected to the Ontario legislature in the 1975 provincial election defeating Progressive Conservative incumbent Eric Winkler by 277 votes in Grey. The Progressive Conservatives won a minority government in this election, and McKessock served in opposition. He was re-elected in the elections of 1977 and 1981.

McKessock won a landslide re-election victory in the 1985 campaign. The Liberals formed a minority government after the election, and McKessock served as Parliamentary Assistant to the Minister of Correctional Services and Solicitor General. He did not seek re-election in 1987 and returned to his farming career.
