= Abram William Lauder =

Canadian lawyer and political figure

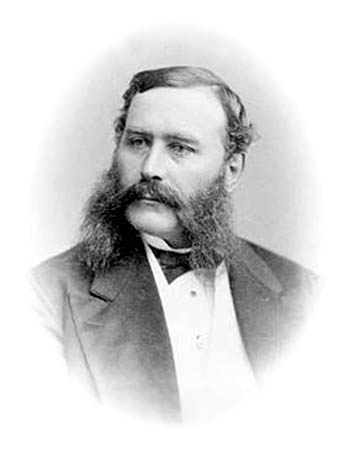

Ontario MPP
- In office 1875–1884
- Preceded by: Riding established
- Succeeded by: Neil McColman
- Constituency: Grey East
- In office 1867–1874
- Preceded by: Riding established
- Succeeded by: James Hill Hunter
- Constituency: Grey South

Personal details
- Born: June 6, 1834 Bewcastle, England
- Died: February 20, 1884 (aged 49) Toronto, Ontario
- Party: Conservative
- Spouse: Maria Elise Turner Lauder (m. 1856)
- Children: William Waugh Lauder
- Occupation: Lawyer

Abram William Lauder (June 6, 1834 – February 20, 1884) was a Canadian lawyer and political figure. He represented Grey South in the Legislative Assembly of Ontario from 1867 to 1874 and Grey East from 1875 to 1884.

== Biography ==
Lauder was born at Bewcastle in England in 1834, studied in Scotland and later came to Canada West. He taught school for a while, then moved to Toronto, articled in law and was called to the bar in 1864.

In 1856, he and writer Maria Elise Turner Lauder were married. They had one child, the pianist William Waugh Lauder.

In 1871, it was found that one of Lauder's supporters had used bribery to obtain votes. Lauder himself was not implicated, but was unseated as a result and then was reelected in the by-election that followed. Lauder later proved that a government land valuator, John L. Lewis had influenced voters in Proton by promising benefits from a Liberal government; also implicated were Archibald McKellar, Adam Oliver and James Kirkpatrick Kerr, the law partner of Ontario Premier Edward Blake. In 1872, Lauder defended the strike committee of the Toronto Typographical Union against charges brought forward by the Master Printers' Association; Canadian law at the time was not clear on the status of labour organizations.

In 1881, Lauder Township was named in his honor. He died in Toronto in 1884.

== Electoral history ==
1867 Ontario general election: Grey South
Party	Candidate	Votes	%
Conservative	Abram William Lauder	1,675	53.23
Liberal	W.K. Flesher	1,472	46.77
Total valid votes		3,147	80.86
Eligible voters		3,892	
Conservative pickup new district.			
Source: Elections Ontario

1871 Ontario general election: Grey South
Party	Candidate	Votes	%
Conservative	Abram William Lauder	1,625	59.92
Liberal	Mr. McFayden	1,087	40.08
Turnout		2,712	61.83
Eligible voters		4,386	
Election voided
Source: Elections Ontario

Ontario provincial by-election, January 1872: Grey South Previous election voided
Party	Candidate	Votes	%	±%
Conservative	Abram William Lauder	1,670	52.37	−0.86
Independent	Mr. Dickey	1,519	47.63	
Total valid votes		3,189	100.0	+1.33
Conservative hold		Swing		−0.86
Source: History of the Electoral Districts, Legislatures and Ministries of the Province of Ontario

1875 Ontario general election: Grey East
Party	Candidate	Votes	%
Conservative	Abram William Lauder	1,297	67.55
Liberal	W. Brown	623	32.45
Turnout		1,920	53.42
Eligible voters		3,594	
Conservative pickup new district.			
Source: Elections Ontario

1879 Ontario general election: Grey East
Party	Candidate	Votes	%	±%
Conservative	Abram William Lauder	1,294	55.70	−11.85
Independent	Mr. Myles	728	31.34	
Conservative	Joseph Rorke	301	12.96	
Total valid votes		2,323	49.64	−3.79
Eligible voters		4,680		
Conservative hold		Swing		−11.85
Source: Elections Ontario
