= Bill Murdoch =

Canadian politician

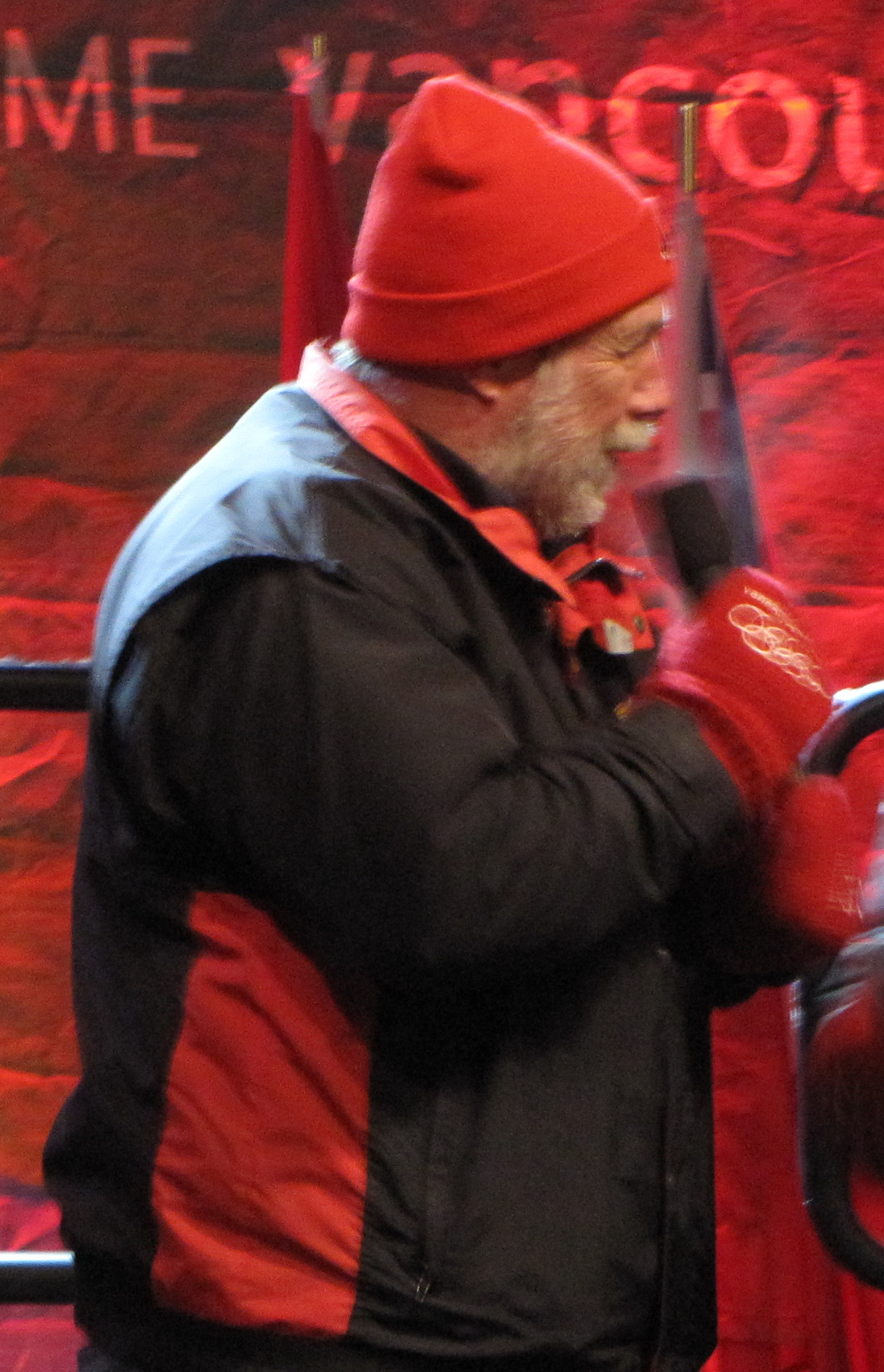
- Murdoch in December 2009

Member of the Ontario Provincial Parliament for Bruce—Grey—Owen Sound (Grey—Owen Sound 1995—1999) (Grey 1990—1995)
- In office September 6, 1990 – October 6, 2011
- Preceded by: Ron Lipsett
- Succeeded by: Bill Walker

Personal details
- Born: William Richard Murdoch; January 10, 1945 Meaford, Ontario
- Died: August 16, 2022 (aged 77) Owen Sound, Ontario
- Party: Progressive Conservative
- Occupation: Farmer

Bill Murdoch (January 10, 1945 – August 16, 2022) was a former politician in Ontario, Canada. He was a Progressive Conservative member of the Legislative Assembly of Ontario from 1990 to 2011, representing the riding of Bruce—Grey—Owen Sound.

== Background ==
Murdoch was educated at the Owen Sound Collegiate and Vocational Institute, and worked as a farmer, electrical draftsman, film stripper and salesman. He was also a Freemason and a member of the Royal Canadian Legion. He served as chair of the Grey Sauble Conservation Authority for five years.

== Politics ==
=== Municipal ===
Murdoch began his political career at the municipal level by serving in for four years as a councillor in Sydenham Township and as reeve for a further eight years. He was elected as warden of Grey County in 1987. Murdoch served as vice-president of the Association of Municipalities of Ontario for two years and was a member of the board of directors for five years.

=== Provincial ===
Murdoch's first bid to enter the Ontario legislature was unsuccessful. He ran as a Progressive Conservative for the riding of Grey in the 1987 Ontario election, in which the Liberals under David Peterson won a landslide majority. Murdoch lost to the Liberal Ron Lipsett, candidate, by about 2000 votes. The Liberals saw their support base decline during the 1990 election, however, and Murdoch was able to win the seat on his second attempt, defeating the New Democrat, candidate Peggy Hutchinson, by about 2500 votes (Lipsett finished third).

Murdoch was easily re-elected in the provincial elections of 1995 and 1999, both of which were won by the Progressive Conservatives under Mike Harris. He developed a reputation as a party maverick, and was never seriously considered for a cabinet appointment.

Murdoch's political philosophy was somewhat eccentric and defies easy summarization. He has never been afraid to criticize his own party, whether in government or opposition. He opposed the Harris government's decision to cancel the province's spring bear hunt and claims that he was fired from a parliamentary assistant position after calling for more free votes in the house. He once demanded a recorded vote on a same-sex benefits bill brought forward by the McGuinty government. Only 3 of the required 5 members stood to request a recorded vote and the Bill passed on an unrecorded voice vote.

Murdoch's riding included the town of Walkerton (since the provincial riding re-organization, it is in Huron-Bruce), which suffered from a deadly outbreak of E. coli in 2000 as a result of polluted water. Some criticized Murdoch for rejecting the possibility that his government's cutbacks were partly responsible for the outbreak.

The Progressive Conservatives lost the 2003 election though Murdoch was re-elected in his own riding. After the election, he considered sitting as a member of the New Democratic Party; not for ideological reasons, but in order to give the NDP official party status in the legislature after it fell one short of the required eight seats. Though Murdoch's beliefs are far removed from NDP policy, he claimed he was willing to cross the floor because the party deserved a voice in the legislature. The plan was seriously considered by NDP leader Howard Hampton, but came to nothing. The NDP subsequently won a by-election, and regained party status on their own.

During the 2007 Ontario election, Murdoch sparked controversy by being the first PC caucus member to publicly oppose the party leader John Tory's proposal for public funding of all private religious schools in the province. Murdoch stated that although he initially supported the plan, the widespread opposition by his constituents convinced him to reconsider his position. He has stated that if the issue came before the legislature, he would vote against it. Tory, commenting on Murdoch's position, stated, "When you look up maverick in the dictionary you find his picture there — in colour...."

On September 12, 2008, he was suspended from the Progressive Conservative caucus for openly calling for Tory's resignation. On September 18, 2008, he was permanently expelled from the Progressive Conservative caucus and sat as an Independent member of the legislature.

On April 23, 2009, Progressive Conservative interim leader Bob Runciman announced Murdoch would be returning to the PC caucus effective immediately.

On July 5, 2010, Murdoch announced that he would retire after the 2011 provincial election, which saw the Progressive Conservatives maintain their hold on the Bruce-Grey-Owen Sound riding under first-time MPP Bill Walker.

== After politics ==
After retiring from politics, Murdoch hosted an open-line radio talk show on CFOS 560 AM (Owen Sound, Ontario) on Monday, Wednesday and Friday mornings (9-10 AM Eastern Time) which, dependent upon the day of the week, was identified on air as "Murdoch Mondays", "Mid-week with Murdoch" and/or "Rock and Talk with Murdoch". In addition to talk, the program also showcased the music of local (mainly Grey and Bruce counties) recording artists. In July 2022 he was admitted to the Chapman house hospice at 77 years old for cancer. He was awarded a Platinum Jubilee medal by MP Alex Ruff for his community service. He died on August 16, 2022. A funeral was held for Murdoch in Owen Sound and was interred in the McLean's Cemetery in Bognor, Ontario.
