= Stanley Francis Leavine =

Canadian politician

Ontario MPP
- In office 1951–1955
- Preceded by: John Brown
- Succeeded by: John J. Wintermeyer
- Constituency: Waterloo North

Personal details
- Born: 1896; Elgin, Leeds County, Ontario
- Died: July 27, 1958 (aged 62); Kitchener, Ontario
- Political party: Progressive Conservative
- Occupation: Doctor

Stanley Francis Leavine (1896 – July 27, 1958) was an Ontario physician and political figure. He represented Waterloo North in the Legislative Assembly of Ontario from 1951 to 1955 as a Progressive Conservative member.

He was born in Elgin, Leeds County, Ontario, the son of Francis Leavine. He was educated in Elgin and Athens, Ontario and went on to study medicine at Queen's University. Leavine interned in Kingston and New York state before setting up practice in Kitchener in 1923. In 1921, he married Desta Buse. He served on the local board of health and was president of the North Waterloo Academy of Medicine. He joined a field ambulance unit during World War II. Leavine served on Kitchener city council and was mayor in 1950, 1951 and 1958. He was defeated in the 1955 provincial election.

Leavine died July 27, 1958 at hospital in Kitchener following a heart attack. He was buried at Kitchener's Woodland Cemetery.
