= David Jamieson (Canadian politician) =

Canadian politician

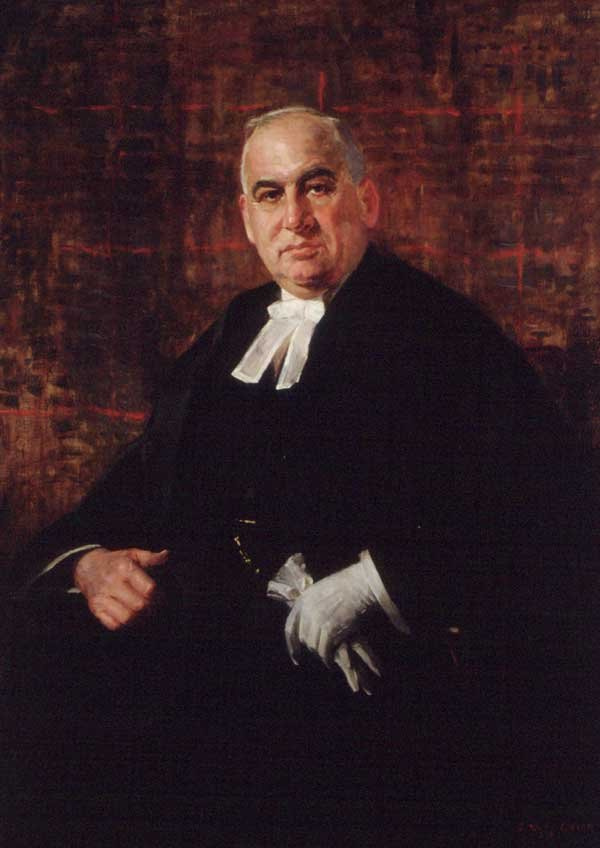

Ontario MPP
- In office 1923–1926
- Preceded by: George Mansfield Leeson
- Succeeded by: Farquhar Oliver
- In office 1898–1919
- Preceded by: David McNicol
- Succeeded by: George Mansfield Leeson
- Constituency: Grey South

Speaker of the Legislative Assembly of Ontario
- In office 1915–1919
- Preceded by: William Hoyle
- Succeeded by: Nelson Parliament

Personal details
- Born: February 3, 1856 Puslinch Township, Canada West
- Died: September 12, 1942 (aged 86) Durham, Ontario
- Party: Conservative
- Spouse: Isabelle Bradshaw (m. 1883)
- Children: 1
- Occupation: Physician

David Edgar Jamieson (February 3, 1856 – September 12, 1942) was a physician and politician in Ontario, Canada. He was speaker of the Legislature of Ontario from 1915 to 1919 and served as Conservative MLA for Grey South from 1898 to 1919 and from 1923 to 1926.

He was born to a Scottish immigrant, William Jamieson, in Puslinch Township, Canada West. Jamieson was educated in local schools and went on to study medicine at the University of Toronto. Upon graduation in 1878, he moved to Durham and set up practice there. He was also president of the Durham Furniture Company. He was elected to the Durham town council in 1883 and was elected reeve in 1884 and 1885. Jamieson was an unsuccessful candidate for the Grey South seat in the Canadian House of Commons in 1887, losing to Liberal George Landerkin. He was first elected to the provincial assembly in 1898. He was defeated by a United Farmers of Ontario candidate in 1919 but was reelected in 1923.

Jamieson served as Minister Without Portfolio in 1926. He was defeated when he ran for reelection later that year. Soon afterwards, he was named chairman of the Mother's Allowance Commission. He was also named chairman of the commission created by the Old Age Pensions Act of 1929. Jamieson retired from these two appointments in 1935 and returned to the practice of medicine and his other business interests in Durham.
