= 1963 Ontario general election =

Canadian provincial election

- September 25, 1963

108 seats in the 27th Legislative Assembly of Ontario 55 seats were needed for a majority
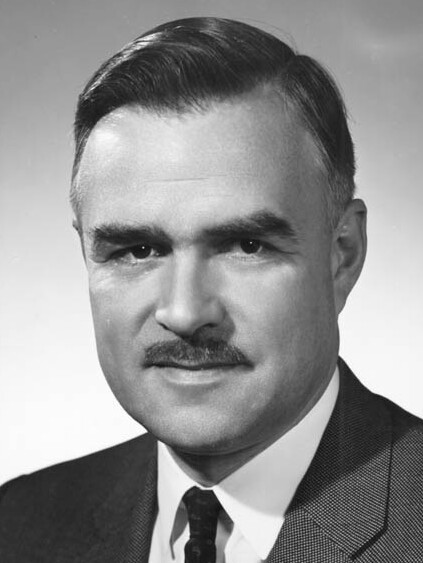

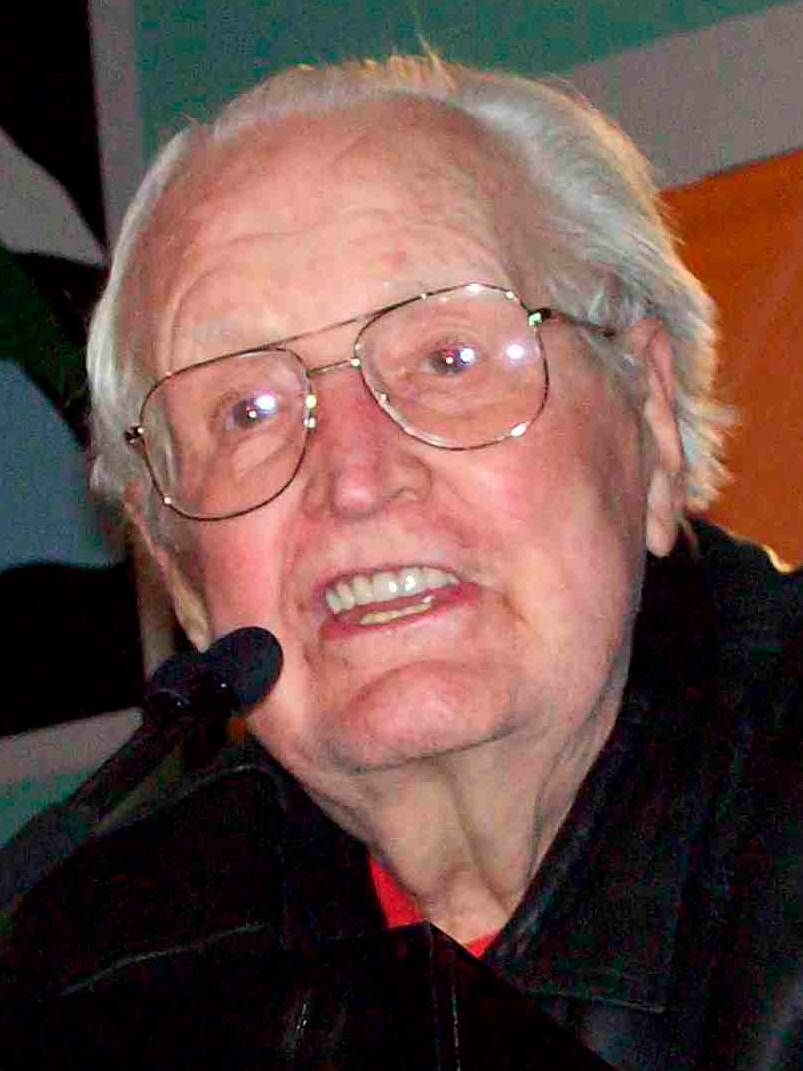
| | First party | Second party | Third party |
|---|---|---|---|
| | | LIB |
| Leader | John Robarts | John Wintermeyer | Donald C. MacDonald |
| Party | Progressive Conservative | Liberal | New Democratic |
| Leader since | October 25, 1961 | April 20, 1958 | November 21, 1953 |
| Leader's seat | London North | Waterloo North (lost re-election) | York South |
| Last election | 71 | 22 | 5 |
| Seats won | 77 | 24 | 7 |
| Seat change | ▲6 | ▲2 | ▲2 |
| Percentage | 48.9% | 35.3% | 15.5% |
| Swing | ▲2.6pp | ▼1.3pp | ▼1.2pp |
Premier before election
John Robarts
Progressive Conservative
Premier after election
John Robarts
Progressive Conservative

The 1963 Ontario general election was held on September 25, 1963, to elect the 108 members of the 27th Legislative Assembly of Ontario (Members of Provincial Parliament, or "MPPs") of the province of Ontario.

The Ontario Progressive Conservative Party, led by John Robarts, who had replaced Leslie Frost as PC leader and premier in 1961, won a seventh consecutive term in office, and maintained its majority in the legislature, increasing its caucus from the 71 members elected in the previous election to 77 members in an enlarged legislature.

The Ontario Liberal Party, led by John Wintermeyer, increased its caucus from 22 to 24 members, although Wintermeyer lost his seat of Waterloo North. He resigned as party leader but the Liberals continued in their role of official opposition. Robert Gibson of Kenora was re-elected as a Liberal-Labour MPP sitting with the Liberal caucus.

The social democratic Co-operative Commonwealth Federation was formally dissolved and succeeded by the Ontario New Democratic Party in 1961. The newly conglomerated party was still led by Donald C. MacDonald, and won two additional seats, for a total of seven.

The Social Credit Party of Ontario split into two factions mirroring the split in the federal party. The official Social Credit party ran candidates in three rural ridings while the more radical Social Credit Action faction ran candidates in six ridings in Toronto.

== Expansion of Legislative Assembly ==
The size of the Legislative Assembly was increased from 98 to 108 members, through the reorganization of Toronto's suburban ridings:

| Abolished ridings | New ridings |
|---|---|
| York Centre | Armourdale; Downsview; Yorkview |
| York East | Don Mills; York East; York Mills |
| York—Humber (Note: The Town of Weston was withdrawn from York-Humber, and transferred to York South.) | Humber |
| York—Scarborough | Scarborough Centre; Scarborough East; Scarborough North; Scarborough West |
| York South | Forest Hill; York South |
| York West | Etobicoke; Lakeshore; York West |

== Results ==
Elections to the 27th Parliament of Ontario (1963)
| Political party | Party leader | MPPs | | | | | Votes | | |
| Political party | Party leader | Candidates | 1959 | Dissol. | 1963 | ± | # | % | ± (pp) |
|---|---|---|---|---|---|---|---|---|---|
| Progressive Conservative | John Robarts | 108 | 71 | | 77 | 6▲ | 1,052,740 | 48.61% | 2.46▲ |
| Liberal | John Wintermeyer | 107 | 21 | | 23 | 2▲ | 754,032 | 34.82% | 1.44▼ |
| New Democratic (Note: Successor to the CCF) | Donald C. MacDonald | 97 | 5 | | 7 | 2▲ | 340,208 | 15.71% | 0.96▼ |
| Liberal–Labour | | 1 | 1 | | 1 | Steady | 6,774 | 0.31% | 0.04▼ |
| Independent PC | | 1 | – | – | – | | 5,190 | 0.24% | 0.13▲ |
| Independent | | 7 | – | – | – | | 2,759 | 0.13% | 0.09▲ |
| Social Credit | | 9 | – | – | – | | 2,313 | 0.11% | 0.02▲ |
| Communist (Note: Successor to Labor-Progressive) | Bruce Magnuson | 6 | – | – | – | | 1,654 | 0.08% | 0.15▼ |
| Socialist Labor | | 1 | – | – | – | | 103 | – | New |
| Labour-CCF | | | – | – | – | | did not campaign | | |
| White Canada | | | – | – | – | | did not campaign | | |
| Vacant | | | | | | | | | |
| Total | | 337 | 98 | 98 | 108 | | 2,165,773 | 100.00% | |
| Blank and invalid ballots | | | | | | | 18,028 | | |
| Registered voters / turnout | | | | | | | 3,435,745 | 59.72% | 3.84▲ |

=== Vote and seat summaries ===
Ternary plots - shift of electoral support (1959-1963)
1959

1963
Electoral districts identified by colours of winning parties

Seats and popular vote by party
| Party | Seats | Votes | Change (pp) |
|---|---|---|---|
| █ Progressive Conservative | 77 / 108 | 48.61% | 2.46 |
| █ Liberal | 23 / 108 | 34.82% | -1.44 |
| █ New Democratic | 7 / 108 | 15.71% | -0.96 |
| █ Other | 1 / 108 | 0.86% | -0.06 |

=== Synopsis of results ===
Results by riding - 1963 Ontario general election
| Riding | Winning party | | | | | | Turnout (Note: including spoilt ballots) | Votes | | | | | | |
| Name (Note: order is as given in EO reports) | 1959 | Party | Votes | Share | Margin # | Margin % | Turnout | PC | Lib/LL | NDP | Ind-PC | Ind | Oth | Total |
|---|---|---|---|---|---|---|---|---|---|---|---|---|---|---|
| Algoma—Manitoulin | PC | Lib | 7,951 | 49.89% | 1,522 | 9.55% | 66.25% | 6,429 | 7,951 | 1,557 | – | – | – | 15,937 |
| Brant | Lib | Lib | 10,771 | 55.31% | 3,792 | 19.47% | 60.75% | 6,979 | 10,771 | 1,725 | – | – | – | 19,475 |
| Brantford | Lib | Lib | 7,572 | 43.55% | 23 | 0.13% | 71.17% | 7,549 | 7,572 | 2,136 | – | 131 | – | 17,388 |
| Bruce | Lib | Lib | 7,997 | 53.61% | 1,076 | 7.21% | 76.56% | 6,921 | 7,997 | – | – | – | – | 14,918 |
| Carleton | PC | PC | 12,999 | 57.13% | 4,496 | 19.76% | 60.96% | 12,999 | 8,503 | 1,251 | – | – | – | 22,753 |
| Cochrane North | PC | PC | 6,443 | 50.28% | 2,556 | 19.95% | 64.37% | 6,443 | 3,887 | 1,975 | – | 509 | – | 12,814 |
| Cochrane South | PC | PC | 12,983 | 51.40% | 4,874 | 19.29% | 62.93% | 12,983 | 4,169 | 8,109 | – | – | – | 25,261 |
| Dufferin—Simcoe | PC | PC | 8,875 | 66.29% | 5,260 | 39.29% | 55.36% | 8,875 | 3,615 | 898 | – | – | – | 13,388 |
| Durham | PC | PC | 7,914 | 51.18% | 1,501 | 9.71% | 70.75% | 7,914 | 6,413 | 1,135 | – | – | – | 15,462 |
| Elgin | PC | PC | 11,382 | 62.81% | 4,643 | 25.62% | 62.89% | 11,382 | 6,739 | – | – | – | – | 18,121 |
| Essex North | Lib | Lib | 14,453 | 45.73% | 3,806 | 12.04% | 68.26% | 10,647 | 14,453 | 6,505 | – | – | – | 31,605 |
| Essex South | PC | Lib | 9,572 | 49.85% | 715 | 3.72% | 73.30% | 8,857 | 9,572 | 773 | – | – | – | 19,202 |
| Fort William | Lib | NDP | 8,427 | 37.45% | 1,172 | 5.21% | 71.10% | 7,255 | 6,820 | 8,427 | – | – | – | 22,502 |
| Frontenac—Addington | PC | PC | 6,746 | 55.11% | 2,019 | 16.49% | 61.20% | 6,746 | 4,727 | 769 | – | – | – | 12,242 |
| Glengarry | PC | PC | 5,361 | 56.25% | 1,363 | 14.30% | 74.96% | 5,361 | 3,998 | 172 | – | – | – | 9,531 |
| Grenville—Dundas | PC | PC | 9,518 | 68.30% | 5,100 | 36.60% | 64.88% | 9,518 | 4,418 | – | – | – | – | 13,936 |
| Grey North | PC | Lib | 6,862 | 44.75% | 31 | 0.20% | 73.20% | 6,831 | 6,862 | 1,642 | – | – | – | 15,335 |
| Grey South | Lib | Lib | 5,459 | 52.06% | 885 | 8.44% | 67.21% | 4,574 | 5,459 | – | – | – | 452 | 10,485 |
| Haldimand—Norfolk | PC | PC | 14,307 | 57.17% | 4,425 | 17.68% | 70.39% | 14,307 | 9,882 | 640 | – | – | 195 | 25,024 |
| Halton | PC | PC | 19,947 | 51.53% | 6,372 | 16.46% | 65.06% | 19,947 | 13,575 | 5,188 | – | – | – | 38,710 |
| Hamilton Centre | PC | PC | 7,533 | 36.29% | 578 | 2.78% | 55.55% | 7,533 | 5,890 | 6,955 | – | – | 382 | 20,760 |
| Hamilton East | CCF | NDP | 8,097 | 36.71% | 952 | 4.32% | 65.26% | 6,812 | 7,145 | 8,097 | – | – | – | 22,054 |
| Hamilton—Wentworth | PC | PC | 13,642 | 63.20% | 9,211 | 42.68% | 61.37% | 13,642 | 4,431 | 3,511 | – | – | – | 21,584 |
| Hastings East | PC | PC | 7,815 | 64.37% | 3,909 | 32.20% | 70.93% | 7,815 | 3,906 | 419 | – | – | – | 12,140 |
| Hastings West | PC | PC | 11,146 | 53.85% | 2,298 | 11.10% | 67.36% | 11,146 | 8,848 | 704 | – | – | – | 20,698 |
| Huron | PC | PC | 8,931 | 67.72% | 4,674 | 35.44% | 69.43% | 8,931 | 4,257 | – | – | – | – | 13,188 |
| Huron—Bruce | PC | Lib | 6,359 | 50.11% | 28 | 0.22% | 81.69% | 6,331 | 6,359 | – | – | – | – | 12,690 |
| Kenora | LL | LL | 6,774 | 45.48% | 840 | 5.64% | 63.66% | 5,934 | 6,774 (Note: Robert Wayne Gibson was elected in a 1962 byelection, succeeding Albert Wren) | 2,187 | – | – | – | 14,895 |
| Kent East | Lib | Lib | 7,365 | 55.49% | 1,458 | 10.99% | 75.51% | 5,907 | 7,365 | – | – | – | – | 13,272 |
| Kent West | PC | PC | 12,205 | 53.69% | 1,676 | 7.37% | 64.99% | 12,205 | 10,529 | – | – | – | – | 22,734 |
| Kingston | PC | PC | 10,092 | 49.11% | 1,024 | 4.98% | 68.40% | 10,092 | 9,068 | 1,389 | – | – | – | 20,549 |
| Lambton East | PC | PC | 7,131 | 52.24% | 864 | 6.33% | 75.93% | 7,131 | 6,267 | 252 | – | – | – | 13,650 |
| Lambton West | PC | PC | 10,813 | 44.69% | 638 | 2.64% | 63.23% | 10,813 | 10,175 | 3,207 | – | – | – | 24,195 |
| Lanark | PC | PC | 8,757 | 72.15% | 6,255 | 51.53% | 54.19% | 8,757 | 2,502 | 879 | – | – | – | 12,138 |
| Leeds | PC | PC | 12,711 | 75.68% | 9,280 | 55.25% | 63.03% | 12,711 | 3,431 | 654 | – | – | – | 16,796 |
| Lincoln | PC | PC | 23,229 | 53.99% | 8,422 | 19.58% | 61.19% | 23,229 | 14,807 | 4,235 | – | – | 753 | 43,024 |
| London North | PC | PC | 12,531 | 68.61% | 8,279 | 45.33% | 57.57% | 12,531 | 4,252 | 1,480 | – | – | – | 18,263 |
| London South | PC | PC | 13,982 | 62.54% | 7,970 | 35.65% | 55.47% | 13,982 | 6,012 | 2,364 | – | – | – | 22,358 |
| Middlesex North | PC | PC | 9,960 | 71.79% | 6,772 | 48.81% | 68.58% | 9,960 | 3,188 | 726 | – | – | – | 13,874 |
| Middlesex South | PC | PC | 12,532 | 60.72% | 5,909 | 28.63% | 62.57% | 12,532 | 6,623 | 1,483 | – | – | – | 20,638 |
| Muskoka | PC | PC | 6,639 | 63.13% | 3,776 | 35.90% | 68.44% | 6,639 | 2,863 | 1,015 | – | – | – | 10,517 |
| Niagara Falls | Lib | Lib | 13,864 | 52.80% | 4,040 | 15.39% | 62.39% | 9,824 | 13,864 | 2,568 | – | – | – | 26,256 |
| Nickel Belt | PC | PC | 9,155 | 36.49% | 956 | 3.81% | 67.48% | 9,155 | 8,199 | 6,898 | – | 835 | – | 25,087 |
| Nipissing | Lib | Lib | 11,424 | 47.52% | 929 | 3.86% | 67.40% | 10,495 | 11,424 | 2,119 | – | – | – | 24,038 |
| Northumberland | PC | PC | 10,219 | 55.12% | 1,897 | 10.23% | 76.36% | 10,219 | 8,322 | – | – | – | – | 18,541 |
| Ontario | PC | PC | 9,903 | 60.29% | 5,605 | 34.12% | 62.17% | 9,903 | 4,298 | 2,224 | – | – | – | 16,425 |
| Oshawa | CCF | PC | 12,077 | 41.45% | 682 | 2.34% | 59.07% | 12,077 | 5,662 | 11,395 | – | – | – | 29,134 |
| Ottawa East | PC | Lib | 8,814 | 51.45% | 1,353 | 7.90% | 58.02% | 7,461 | 8,814 | 857 | – | – | – | 17,132 |
| Ottawa South | PC | PC | 12,671 | 54.50% | 3,333 | 14.34% | 56.68% | 12,671 | 9,338 | 1,241 | – | – | – | 23,250 |
| Ottawa West | PC | PC | 11,048 | 55.76% | 3,049 | 15.39% | 63.32% | 11,048 | 7,999 | 768 | – | – | – | 19,815 |
| Oxford | Lib | PC | 12,972 | 50.65% | 1,493 | 5.83% | 69.88% | 12,972 | 11,479 | 1,161 | – | – | – | 25,612 |
| Parry Sound | PC | PC | 6,414 | 53.81% | 1,696 | 14.23% | 73.06% | 6,414 | 4,718 | 787 | – | – | – | 11,919 |
| Peel | PC | PC | 24,969 | 61.58% | 14,569 | 35.93% | 61.62% | 24,969 | 10,400 | 5,177 | – | – | – | 40,546 |
| Perth | PC | PC | 13,324 | 61.79% | 5,084 | 23.58% | 63.44% | 13,324 | 8,240 | – | – | – | – | 21,564 |
| Peterborough | PC | PC | 16,972 | 58.05% | 9,195 | 31.45% | 67.85% | 16,972 | 7,777 | 4,490 | – | – | – | 29,239 |
| Port Arthur | PC | PC | 13,580 | 50.56% | 6,849 | 25.50% | 66.68% | 13,580 | 6,143 | 6,731 | – | – | 407 | 26,861 |
| Prescott | PC | PC | 6,700 | 55.46% | 1,320 | 10.93% | 71.93% | 6,700 | 5,380 | – | – | – | – | 12,080 |
| Prince Edward—Lennox | PC | PC | 7,645 | 61.96% | 3,883 | 31.47% | 59.64% | 7,645 | 3,762 | 931 | – | – | – | 12,338 |
| Rainy River | PC | PC | 4,568 | 54.06% | 1,955 | 23.14% | 67.05% | 4,568 | 2,613 | 1,269 | – | – | – | 8,450 |
| Renfrew North | PC | PC | 10,664 | 57.80% | 3,740 | 20.27% | 70.53% | 10,664 | 6,924 | 861 | – | – | – | 18,449 |
| Renfrew South | PC | PC | 7,736 | 51.78% | 889 | 5.95% | 79.52% | 7,736 | 6,847 | 358 | – | – | – | 14,941 |
| Russell | PC | PC | 13,661 | 40.42% | 344 | 1.02% | 55.67% | 13,661 | 13,317 | 1,632 | 5,190 | – | – | 33,800 |
| Sault Ste. Marie | PC | PC | 11,559 | 42.24% | 2,200 | 8.04% | 69.12% | 11,559 | 9,359 | 6,446 | – | – | – | 27,364 |
| Simcoe Centre | PC | PC | 10,825 | 62.70% | 5,655 | 32.75% | 59.62% | 10,825 | 5,170 | 1,271 | – | – | – | 17,266 |
| Simcoe East | PC | PC | 9,646 | 57.65% | 3,494 | 20.88% | 64.84% | 9,646 | 6,152 | 935 | – | – | – | 16,733 |
| Stormont | Lib | PC | 11,101 | 52.74% | 1,827 | 8.68% | 69.27% | 11,101 | 9,274 | 675 | – | – | – | 21,050 |
| Sudbury | Lib | Lib | 10,176 | 41.60% | 914 | 3.74% | 65.96% | 9,262 | 10,176 | 5,022 | – | – | – | 24,460 |
| Temiskaming | PC | Lib | 4,124 | 40.41% | 270 | 2.65% | 69.45% | 3,854 | 4,124 | 2,227 | – | – | – | 10,205 |
| Victoria | PC | PC | 9,091 | 56.90% | 2,976 | 18.63% | 70.00% | 9,091 | 6,115 | 771 | – | – | – | 15,977 |
| Waterloo North | Lib | PC | 18,760 | 47.30% | 2,813 | 7.09% | 73.99% | 18,760 | 15,947 | 4,951 | – | – | – | 39,658 |
| Waterloo South | PC | PC | 10,436 | 43.88% | 3,700 | 15.56% | 68.39% | 10,436 | 6,736 | 6,610 | – | – | – | 23,782 |
| Welland | PC | PC | 16,142 | 52.15% | 3,437 | 11.10% | 66.20% | 16,142 | 12,705 | 2,108 | – | – | – | 30,955 |
| Wellington—Dufferin | PC | PC | 7,666 | 66.33% | 4,445 | 38.46% | 63.22% | 7,666 | 3,221 | 671 | – | – | – | 11,558 |
| Wellington South | Lib | Lib | 10,829 | 47.36% | 2,146 | 9.39% | 70.87% | 8,683 | 10,829 | 3,351 | – | – | – | 22,863 |
| Wentworth | Lib | PC | 12,089 | 37.61% | 943 | 2.93% | 60.10% | 12,089 | 11,146 | 8,909 | – | – | – | 32,144 |
| Wentworth East | CCF | NDP | 8,634 | 41.71% | 1,970 | 9.52% | 56.76% | 6,664 | 5,400 | 8,634 | – | – | – | 20,698 |
| Windsor—Sandwich | Lib | Lib | 10,739 | 42.29% | 1,121 | 4.41% | 61.52% | 9,618 | 10,739 | 5,035 | – | – | – | 25,392 |
| Windsor—Walkerville | Lib | Lib | 7,781 | 49.74% | 2,393 | 15.30% | 65.96% | 5,388 | 7,781 | 2,473 | – | – | – | 15,642 |
| York North | PC | PC | 18,233 | 49.22% | 6,233 | 16.83% | 57.35% | 18,233 | 12,000 | 5,959 | – | 850 | – | 37,042 |
| Armourdale | New | PC | 10,218 | 50.09% | 4,176 | 20.47% | 63.90% | 10,218 | 6,042 | 4,140 | – | – | – | 20,400 |
| Beaches | PC | PC | 7,277 | 40.67% | 820 | 4.58% | 68.00% | 7,277 | 4,158 | 6,457 | – | – | – | 17,892 |
| Bellwoods | PC | PC | 6,039 | 50.98% | 2,026 | 17.10% | 61.98% | 6,039 | 4,013 | 1,793 | – | – | – | 11,845 |
| Bracondale | Lib | Lib | 4,271 | 38.31% | 69 | 0.62% | 61.33% | 4,202 | 4,271 | 2,675 | – | – | – | 11,148 |
| Don Mills | New | PC | 9,708 | 51.64% | 4,456 | 23.70% | 60.12% | 9,708 | 3,841 | 5,252 | – | – | – | 18,801 |
| Dovercourt | Lib | Lib | 6,938 | 45.72% | 2,120 | 13.97% | 58.53% | 4,818 | 6,938 | 3,418 | – | – | – | 15,174 |
| Downsview | New | Lib | 7,335 | 38.13% | 528 | 2.74% | 51.02% | 5,097 | 7,335 | 6,807 | – | – | – | 19,239 |
| Eglinton | PC | PC | 18,371 | 55.22% | 6,389 | 19.20% | 67.53% | 18,371 | 11,982 | 2,916 | – | – | – | 33,269 |
| Etobicoke | New | Lib | 8,193 | 42.73% | 446 | 2.33% | 62.61% | 7,747 | 8,193 | 3,232 | – | – | – | 19,172 |
| Forest Hill | New | PC | 10,001 | 40.87% | 2,253 | 9.21% | 59.01% | 10,001 | 6,509 | 7,748 | – | – | 210 | 24,468 |
| High Park | PC | PC | 7,676 | 42.66% | 891 | 4.95% | 64.53% | 7,676 | 6,785 | 3,420 | – | – | 114 | 17,995 |
| Humber (Note: formerly known as York—Humber) | PC | PC | 10,144 | 45.76% | 3,288 | 14.83% | 60.32% | 10,144 | 6,856 | 5,170 | – | – | – | 22,170 |
| Lakeshore | New | PC | 8,598 | 43.32% | 2,735 | 13.78% | 62.15% | 8,598 | 5,863 | 5,024 | – | – | 364 | 19,849 |
| Parkdale | Lib | Lib | 9,100 | 44.95% | 2,259 | 11.16% | 58.51% | 6,841 | 9,100 | 4,304 | – | – | – | 20,245 |
| Riverdale | PC | PC | 8,047 | 49.45% | 3,736 | 22.96% | 56.26% | 8,047 | 4,311 | 3,676 | – | 137 | 103 | 16,274 |
| St. Andrew | PC | PC | 4,310 | 43.86% | 833 | 8.48% | 58.04% | 4,310 | 3,477 | 1,640 | – | 297 | 102 | 9,826 |
| St. David | PC | PC | 6,051 | 42.98% | 518 | 3.68% | 58.91% | 6,051 | 5,533 | 2,139 | – | – | 355 | 14,078 |
| St. George | PC | PC | 9,134 | 53.86% | 3,547 | 20.91% | 57.56% | 9,134 | 5,587 | 1,941 | – | – | 298 | 16,960 |
| St. Patrick | PC | PC | 4,821 | 47.75% | 777 | 7.70% | 60.58% | 4,821 | 4,044 | 1,025 | – | – | 207 | 10,097 |
| Scarborough Centre | New | PC | 7,264 | 37.37% | 404 | 2.08% | 60.00% | 7,264 | 5,314 | 6,860 | – | – | – | 19,438 |
| Scarborough East | New | PC | 5,623 | 44.35% | 1,704 | 13.44% | 57.14% | 5,623 | 3,919 | 3,137 | – | – | – | 12,679 |
| Scarborough North | New | PC | 9,918 | 50.73% | 5,069 | 25.93% | 57.45% | 9,918 | 4,849 | 4,785 | – | – | – | 19,552 |
| Scarborough West | New | NDP | 10,641 | 43.47% | 2,471 | 10.10% | 63.21% | 8,170 | 5,538 | 10,641 | – | – | 128 | 24,477 |
| Woodbine | CCF | NDP | 9,020 | 45.89% | 1,281 | 6.52% | 48.85% | 7,739 | 2,898 | 9,020 | – | – | – | 19,657 |
| York East | PC | PC | 12,930 | 52.35% | 5,926 | 23.99% | 61.70% | 12,930 | 7,004 | 4,765 | – | – | – | 24,699 |
| York Mills | New | PC | 16,391 | 57.41% | 8,351 | 29.25% | 63.43% | 16,391 | 4,122 | 8,040 | – | – | – | 28,553 |
| York South | CCF | NDP | 10,538 | 47.58% | 3,575 | 16.14% | 60.25% | 6,963 | 4,646 | 10,538 | – | – | – | 22,147 |
| Yorkview | New | NDP | 7,607 | 38.38% | 703 | 3.55% | 56.03% | 5,310 | 6,904 | 7,607 | – | – | – | 19,821 |
| York West | PC | PC | 15,107 | 64.35% | 8,802 | 37.49% | 60.66% | 15,107 | 6,305 | 2,064 | – | – | – | 23,476 |

= open seat
= turnout is above provincial average
= winning candidate was in previous Legislature
= incumbent had switched allegiance
= incumbency arose from byelection gain
= previously incumbent in another riding
= other incumbents renominated
= Liberal-Labour candidate
= multiple candidates

=== Analysis ===
Party candidates in 2nd place
| Party in 1st place | Party in 2nd place | | | Total |
| Party in 1st place | PC | Lib | NDP | Total |
|---|---|---|---|---|
| Progressive Conservative | | 68 | 9 | 77 |
| Liberal | 22 | | 1 | 23 |
| Liberal–Labour | 1 | | | 1 |
| New Democratic | 5 | 2 | | 7 |
| Total | 28 | 70 | 10 | 108 |

Candidates ranked 1st to 5th place, by party
| Parties | 1st | 2nd | 3rd | 4th | 5th |
|---|---|---|---|---|---|
| █ Progressive Conservative | 77 | 28 | 3 | | |
| █ Liberal | 23 | 70 | 14 | | |
| █ New Democratic | 7 | 10 | 79 | 1 | |
| █ Liberal–Labour | 1 | | | | |
| █ Social Credit | | | 1 | 5 | 3 |
| █ Independent PC | | | 1 | | |
| █ Communist | | | | 6 | |
| █ Independent | | | | 6 | |
| █ Socialist Labor | | | | | 1 |

Resulting composition of the 27th Legislative Assembly
| Source | | Party | | | | |
|---|---|---|---|---|---|---|
| Source | | PC | Lib | Lib-Lab | NDP | Total |
| Seats retained | Incumbents returned | 48 | 15 | 1 | 4 | 68 |
| Seats retained | Open seats held | 14 | | | | 14 |
| Seats retained | Byelection loss reversed | 1 | | | | 1 |
| Seats retained | Ouster of incumbent changing allegiance | 1 | | | | 1 |
| Seats changing hands | Incumbents defeated | 4 | 4 | | 1 | 10 |
| Seats changing hands | Incumbent defeated by previous incumbent from another riding | 1 | | | | 1 |
| Seats changing hands | Open seats gained | | 1 | | | 1 |
| Seats changing hands | Byelection gains held | | 1 | | | 1 |
| New ridings | New MPPs | 8 | 1 | | 2 | 11 |
| New ridings | Won by previous incumbent from another riding | | 1 | | | 1 |
| Total | | 77 | 23 | 1 | 7 | 108 |

=== Reorganization of ridings ===
The reorganized ridings returned the following MPPs:

| 1959 | | 1963 | |
| Riding | Party | Riding | Party |
|---|---|---|---|
| York Centre | █ Liberal | Armourdale | █ Progressive Conservative |
| York Centre | █ Liberal | Downsview | █ Liberal |
| York Centre | █ Liberal | Yorkview | █ New Democratic |
| York East | █ Progressive Conservative | Don Mills | █ Progressive Conservative |
| York East | █ Progressive Conservative | York East | █ Progressive Conservative |
| York East | █ Progressive Conservative | York Mills | █ Progressive Conservative |
| York—Humber | █ Progressive Conservative | Humber | █ Progressive Conservative |
| York—Scarborough | █ Progressive Conservative | Scarborough Centre | █ Progressive Conservative |
| York—Scarborough | █ Progressive Conservative | Scarborough East | █ Progressive Conservative |
| York—Scarborough | █ Progressive Conservative | Scarborough North | █ Progressive Conservative |
| York—Scarborough | █ Progressive Conservative | Scarborough West | █ New Democratic |
| York South | █ Co-operative Commonwealth | Forest Hill | █ Progressive Conservative |
| York South | █ Co-operative Commonwealth | York South | █ New Democratic |
| York West | █ Progressive Conservative | Etobicoke | █ Liberal |
| York West | █ Progressive Conservative | Lakeshore | █ Progressive Conservative |
| York West | █ Progressive Conservative | York West | █ Progressive Conservative |

=== Seats that changed hands ===
Elections to the 27th Parliament of Ontario – unaltered seats won/lost by party, 1959–1963
| Party | 1959 | Gain from (loss to) | | | | | | | | 1963 |
| Party | 1959 | PC | | Lib | | NDP | | L-L | | 1963 |
|---|---|---|---|---|---|---|---|---|---|---|
| Progressive Conservative | 67 | | | 4 | (6) | 1 | | | | 66 |
| Liberal | 20 | 6 | (4) | | | | (1) | | | 21 |
| New Democratic | 4 | | (1) | 1 | | | | | | 4 |
| Liberal–Labour | 1 | | | | | | | | | 1 |
| Total | 92 | 6 | (5) | 5 | (6) | 1 | 1 | – | – | 92 |

There were 12 seats that changed allegiance in the election.

PC to Liberal

- Algoma—Manitoulin
- Essex South
- Grey North
- Huron—Bruce
- Ottawa East
- Timiskaming

Liberal to PC

- Oxford
- Stormont
- Waterloo North
- Wentworth

Liberal to NDP

- Fort William

NDP to PC

- Oshawa

== See also ==
- Politics of Ontario
- List of Ontario political parties
- Premier of Ontario
- Leader of the Opposition (Ontario)
