= John Blythe (Canadian politician) =

Canadian politician

Ontario MPP
- In office 1883–1890
- Preceded by: James Hill Hunter
- Succeeded by: James Hill Hunter
- Constituency: Grey South

Personal details
- Born: October 4, 1849 Guelph, Canada West
- Died: June 30, 1895 (aged 45) Normanby Township, Ontario, Canada
- Party: Conservative
- Spouse: Jane Peteo (m. 1871)
- Occupation: Farmer

John Blythe (October 4, 1849 – June 30, 1895) was an Ontario farmer and political figure. He represented Grey South in the Legislative Assembly of Ontario from 1883 to 1890 as a Conservative member.

He was born in Guelph, Canada West in 1849, the son of Alexander Wright Blythe, a Scottish immigrant. In 1871, he married Jane Peteo.

Blythe served as reeve for Normanby Township. He died on June 30, 1895 after a brief illness.
