= Neil McColman =

Canadian politician

Ontario MPP
- In office 1875–1884
- Preceded by: Abram William Lauder
- Succeeded by: Riding abolished
- Constituency: Grey East

Personal details
- Born: February 13, 1834 Islay, Argyll, Scotland
- Died: December 11, 1907 (aged 73) Thornbury, Ontario
- Party: Conservative
- Spouse: Martha Green (m. 1857)
- Occupation: Farmer

Neil McColman (February 13, 1834 – December 11, 1907) was an Ontario political figure. He represented Grey East in the Legislative Assembly of Ontario from 1884 to 1886 as a Conservative member.

He was born on the island of Islay, Argyll, Scotland in 1834, the son of Peter McColman, and came with his family to Caledon West, Canada West in 1845. The family later moved to a farm near Collingwood. McColman was a farmer until 1882, when he moved to Thornbury. In 1857, he married Martha Green. He was elected to the township council for Collingwood, also serving as reeve. He was elected to the Ontario assembly in an 1884 by-election held after the death of Abram William Lauder. McColman was a master in the local Orange lodge.
