= Gilbert McKechnie =

Canadian politician

Ontario MPP
- In office 1891–1894
- Preceded by: James Hill Hunter
- Succeeded by: David McNicol
- Constituency: Grey South

Personal details
- Born: 1842 Campbeltown, Argyleshire
- Died: December 21, 1930 (aged 87–88) Durham, Grey, Ontario
- Party: Liberal
- Occupation: Businessman

Gilbert McKechnie (1842 – December 21, 1930) was a Scottish-born Ontario merchant and political figure. He represented Grey South in the Legislative Assembly of Ontario from 1891 to 1894 as a Liberal member.

He was born in Campbeltown, Argyleshire in 1845 and came to Canada West in 1855.

He owned a general store and was also president of the G. B. & W. Railway. McKechnie represented Durham Township on the council for Grey County from 1877 to 1884 and in 1887. He was elected to the provincial assembly in an 1891 by-election held after the death of James Hill Hunter. McKechnie was unsuccessful in a bid for reelection in 1894.

He died on December 21, 1930.
