= Leader of the Official Opposition (Ontario) =

Position in the Legislative Assembly of Ontario

- Chef de l'Opposition officielle
- Incumbent; Marit Stiles since February 4, 2023
- Official Opposition; Legislative Assembly of Ontario
- Member of: Legislative Assembly of Ontario
- Term length: While leader of the largest party not in government
- Inaugural holder: Edward Blake
- Formation: 1869; 157 years ago
- Salary: $253,403 (2026)

The leader of the Official Opposition (French: chef de l'Opposition officielle) is the leader of the largest political party in the Legislative Assembly of Ontario that is not in government and is typically the second-largest party. The position is formally titled the leader of His Majesty's Loyal Opposition (French: chef de la loyale opposition de Sa Majesté); under the Westminster system, while the parliamentary opposition opposes the incumbent government, it remains loyal to the Crown and thus to Canada.

Marit Stiles has served as the leader of the Official Opposition since February 4, 2023. She leads the New Democratic Party (NDP), which has held the second largest number of seats in the Legislative Assembly since the 2018 provincial election.

== History ==
Ontario's first Leader of the Official Opposition was Edward Blake of the Ontario Liberal Party who held the position from 1869 until 1871 when he became Premier of Ontario (Archibald McKellar had previously led the Liberal Party in the legislature for two years, but was not formally recognized as opposition leader). Ten leaders were Premier before after they served this post.

- Archibald McKellar (Liberal) 1867-1869 was not formally recognized as opposition leader, but led the Liberal Party in the legislature.

== List of official opposition leaders ==
Leader	Party	Took office	Left office
Edward Blake	Liberal	December 1869	December 1871
Matthew Crooks Cameron	Conservative	December 1871	1878
William Ralph Meredith	Conservative	October 1878	October 1894
George Marter	Conservative	October 1894	April 1896
James Whitney	Conservative	April 1896	January 1905
George William Ross	Liberal	February 1905	January 1907
George Graham	Liberal	January 1907	August 1907
Alexander Grant MacKay	Liberal	August 1907	1911
Newton Rowell	Liberal	December 1911	1917
William Proudfoot	Liberal	February 1918	June 1919
Hartley Dewart	Liberal	June 1919	October 1921
Wellington Hay	Liberal	March 1922	June 1923
William Sinclair ^{1} ^{2}	Liberal	August 1923	June 1934
George Henry	Conservative	July 1935	December 1938
George Drew	Conservative/Progressive Conservative	1939	1943
Ted Jolliffe	Co-operative Commonwealth Federation	August 1943	June 1945
Farquhar Oliver	Liberal	July 1945	June 1948
Ted Jolliffe (second time)	Co-operative Commonwealth Federation	July 1948	November 1951
Farquhar Oliver^{3} (second time)	Liberal	1951	April 1958
John Wintermeyer	Liberal	April 1958	August 1963
Farquhar Oliver ^{4} (third time)	Liberal	October 1963	September 1964
Andy Thompson	Liberal	September 1964	November 1966
Robert Nixon	Liberal	February 1967	September 18, 1975
Stephen Lewis	New Democratic	October 28, 1975	April 29, 1977
Stuart Smith	Liberal	June 1977	September 1981
Robert Nixon^{5} (second time)	Liberal	January 25, 1982	February 21, 1982
David Peterson	Liberal	February 1982	June 1985
Frank Miller	Progressive Conservative	1985	1985
Larry Grossman	Progressive Conservative	1985	1987
Bob Rae	New Democratic	1987	1990
Robert Nixon ^{6} (third time)	Liberal	November 20, 1990	July 31, 1991
Murray Elston ^{7}	Liberal	1991	1991
Jim Bradley ^{8}	Liberal	1991	1992
Lyn McLeod	Liberal	1992	1996
Dalton McGuinty	Liberal	1996	2003
Ernie Eves	Progressive Conservative	2003	2004
Bob Runciman ^{9}	Progressive Conservative	2004	2005
John Tory	Progressive Conservative	2005	2007
Bob Runciman^{10} (second time)	Progressive Conservative	2007	2009
Tim Hudak	Progressive Conservative	2009	2014
Jim Wilson^{11}	Progressive Conservative	2014	2015
Patrick Brown	Progressive Conservative	2015	2018
Vic Fedeli^{12}	Progressive Conservative	2018	2018
Andrea Horwath	New Democratic	2018	2022
Peter Tabuns^{13}	New Democratic	2022	2023
Marit Stiles	New Democratic	2023	present

^{1} The Liberals were recognized as the Official Opposition following the 1923 election by the governing Conservatives, despite the fact that the United Farmers of Ontario had more seats. According to historian Peter Oliver, this was an arbitrary decision without basis in precedent or law. Conservative Premier G. Howard Ferguson used as justification an announcement by UFO general secretary James J. Morrison that the UFO would be withdrawing from party politics, though Oliver argues that this was facetious logic. UFO parliamentary leader Manning Doherty protested the decision, but to no avail. (source: Peter Oliver, G. Howard Ferguson: Ontario Tory, (Toronto: University of Toronto Press, 1977), p. 158.)

^{2} From 1930, the Liberal Party was led by Mitchell Hepburn, but Sinclair continued as Leader of the Opposition as Hepburn did not seek a seat in the legislature until the 1934 general election which made him Premier.

^{3} Until 1954, the Liberals were led from outside the legislature by Walter Thomson with Oliver as acting Leader of the Opposition. Oliver led the party in his own right (for a second time) from 1954 until 1958.

^{4} Interim Liberal leader following the personal defeat of Wintermeyer in the 1963 provincial election until Thompson's election as leader.

^{5} Interim Liberal leader of the party following the resignation of Stuart Smith.

^{6} Interim Liberal leader of the party following the personal defeat of Premier David Peterson in the 1990 election.

^{7} Elston became interim Liberal leader when Nixon resigned from the legislature to accept a federal appointment. Elston stepped down in November when he decided to be a candidate at the Liberal leadership convention.

^{8} Interim Liberal leader between resignation of Elston and election of McLeod.

^{9} John Tory was chosen as leader of the Ontario Progressive Conservative Party on September 18, 2004, but did not hold a seat in the legislature. On September 28 the party announced that Bob Runciman would act as interim PC leader until Tory entered the legislature. Tory was elected to represent Dufferin—Peel—Wellington—Grey on March 17, 2005, and was sworn in as an MPP and leader of the opposition on March 29, 2005.

^{10} As Ontario PC leader John Tory did not win a seat in the 2007 election, Runciman served as Leader of the Opposition in the legislature. (Tory had been running in the Don Valley West riding.) After spending more than a year outside the legislature, Tory sought a seat in the March 5, 2009 by-election in Haliburton—Kawartha Lakes—Brock. He lost this by-election, and thereafter resigned as party leader. Runciman served as interim party leader as well as opposition leader until Hudak was chosen as the party leadership convention.

^{11} Wilson served as interim leader of the Progressive Conservative party following the resignation of Tim Hudak and continued to serve as Leader of the Opposition after Patrick Brown became party leader on May 9, 2015, until September when Brown won a seat in the legislature through a by-election.

^{12} Vic Fedeli was chosen interim leader of the PC Party by caucus on January 26, 2018, one day after Patrick Brown resigned due to allegations of sexual misconduct. He continued to serve as Leader of the Opposition after Doug Ford became party leader on March 10, 2018, as Ford did not have a seat in the legislature.

^{13} Peter Tabuns was chosen as interim leader by the NDP caucus on June 28, 2022, following the resignation of Andrea Horwath.

== List of deputy opposition leaders ==
Deputy leader	Electoral district	Term Start	Term End	Opposition leader	Notes
Donald Deacon	York Centre	1973	September 1975	Robert Nixon	
		1975	1977	Stephen Lewis	
No deputy named		1977	March 1982	Stuart Smith	
Sean Conway	Renfrew North	March 1982	June 1985	David Peterson	
		1985	1987	Larry Grossman	
		1987	1990	Bob Rae	
Sean Conway	Renfrew North	September 1991	December 1996	Lyn McLeod	
Joseph Cordiano	Lawrence	December 1996	1998	Dalton McGuinty	
Gerry Phillips	Scarborough—Agincourt	1998	June 1999	Dalton McGuinty	
Sandra Pupatello	Windsor West	June 1999	September 2003	Dalton McGuinty	
Elizabeth Witmer	Kitchener—Waterloo	October 23, 2003	July 27, 2009	John Tory	
Christine Elliott	Whitby–Ajax	July 27, 2009	August 28, 2015	Tim Hudak	
Steve Clark	Leeds–Grenville	September 11, 2015	May 8, 2018	Patrick Brown	Serving together
Sylvia Jones	Dufferin—Caledon	September 11, 2015	May 8, 2018	Patrick Brown	Serving together
Sara Singh	Brampton Centre	August 23, 2018	July 13, 2022	Andrea Howarth	Serving together
John Vanthof	Timiskaming—Cochrane	August 23, 2018	July 13, 2022	Andrea Howarth	Serving together
Doly Begum	Scarborough Southwest	July 13, 2022	February 3, 2026	Marit Stiles	Served with Sol Mamakwa
Sol Mamakwa	Kiiwetinoong	July 13, 2022	Incumbent	Marit Stiles	Served with Doly Begum until February 3, 2026
