= Dougall Carmichael =

Canadian politician

Dougall Carmichael DSO MC VD

Ontario MPP
- In office 1919–1926
- Preceded by: Isaac Benson Lucas
- Succeeded by: Riding abolished
- Constituency: Grey Centre

Personal details
- Born: 8 November 1885 Collingwood, Ontario
- Died: 15 September 1945 (aged 59) Ottawa, Ontario
- Resting place: Collingwood Presbyterian Cemetery
- Party: United Farmers
- Spouse: Bessie Devereaux
- Occupation: Farmer
- Portfolio: Minister without portfolio, 1919-1923

Military service
- Allegiance: Canadian
- Branch/service: Canadian Expeditionary Force
- Years of service: 1915–1919
- Rank: Lieutenant-colonel
- Unit: 58th Battalion; 116th Battalion
- Battles/wars: World War I
- Awards: DSO and bar MC and bar Mentioned in dispatches

Dougall Carmichael, DSO MC VD (8 November 1885 – 15 September 1945), was a Canadian farmer, war hero, politician and public servant.

== Personal life ==
Born Dougald Carmichael to John and Mary Carmichael in 1885 in Collingwood Township, Grey County, Ontario. He was the older brother of Capt. John Carmichael, who died of injuries incurred as a field ambulance driver in France on April 20, 1918, and Nursing Sister Rachel Carmichael. Dougall grew up to become a farmer. He married Bessie Devereaux in Collingwood in 1920, after returning home from World War I.

Together, they had one child, Mary Devereaux Carmichael, six grandchildren, and numerous great-grandchildren. In 1928, Bessie was injured and remained bedridden, leading Dougall to sell his farm and move their family to Ottawa, where he became a civil servant, and later a Colonel in a military training facility in Brockville.

== World War I ==
Carmichael served in the Canadian Militia for ten years in 35th Simcoe Foresters, before enlisting into the 58th Battalion, Canadian Expeditionary Force, in 1915. He attained the rank of Major, and became second in command of the 58th. He had many raids to his credit, and showed up well in all battles. When Colonel George Pearkes was wounded in September 1918, Carmichael took over his command of the 116th Battalion and faced violent opposition at Cambrai.

He received numerous honours for his service:

- Distinguished Service Order and bar in 1919
- Military Cross and bar in 1917 and 1918
- Mentioned in dispatches in 1918 and 1919

== Political career ==
Shortly after his discharge from service in 1919, he stood in the Ontario general election, and was elected in Grey Centre. He became Minister without portfolio in the United Farmers of Ontario – Labour coalition government which was in office from 1919 to 1923.

He was given the responsibility of being the government representative on the Hydro-Electric Power Commission of Ontario, and specifically with keeping its chairman Adam Beck in line. He also promoted the cause of rural electrification.

In 1922, Carmichael announced to the Legislature that he was resigning as Commissioner because Hydro "was either inefficient or dishonest." He was forced to retract the allegation of dishonesty. He also continued to be Commissioner until the following year.

Hydro's plans for the promotion of interurban railways were significantly scaled back after the Sutherland Commission's report on the subject recommended it in 1921, and its affairs in general were the subject of the Gregory Commission appointed in 1922.

Carmichael retained his seat in the 1923 general election, in contrast to the fortunes of many of his UFO colleagues, and returned to his farm. He contested the federal 1925 election in Grey North as a Progressive candidate, but lost to the incumbent Matthew Robert Duncan. Grey Centre was abolished before the 1926 general election, and he did not campaign elsewhere.

== Public service ==
In 1930, Carmichael was appointed as a member of the War Veterans Allowance Board. At the beginning of World War II, he returned to military service as a colonel in charge of a training centre in Brockville for a year, but returned to Ottawa to become Acting chairman of the board in 1942 and chairman in 1944. He died in 1945. He is buried in Collingwood Presbyterian Cemetery.
