= Eric Winkler =

Canadian politician (1920–1995)

- Official 1966 portrait

Ontario MPP
- In office 1967–1975
- Preceded by: Farquhar Oliver
- Succeeded by: Bob McKessock
- Constituency: Grey South (Note: Riding renamed to Grey in 1974.)

Member of Parliament for Grey—Bruce
- In office 1957–1967
- Preceded by: Walter Harris
- Succeeded by: Riding abolished

Personal details
- Born: February 13, 1920 Hanover, Ontario
- Died: March 18, 1995 (aged 75) Hanover, Ontario
- Party: Progressive Conservative
- Spouse: Frances Winkler
- Children: 4
- Occupation: Retail merchant

Military service
- Allegiance: Canadian
- Branch/service: RCAF
- Years of service: 1940-1946
- Rank: Flying officer
- Unit: Bomber Command

Eric Alfred Winkler (February 13, 1920 – March 18, 1995) was a politician in Ontario, Canada. He was a Progressive Conservative member of the House of Commons of Canada from 1957 to 1967 who represented the riding of Grey—Bruce. He was also a member of provincial parliament from 1967 to 1975 who represented the riding of Grey South. He served as a cabinet minister in the government of Bill Davis.

== Background ==
Born in Hanover, Ontario, he worked in a local furniture factory before joining the RCAF. He served as a flying officer during World War II, flying missions over Europe when he was shot down in 1942. He survived but was held as a prisoner of war until his release in 1945. When the war ended, he came home and opened Winkler Brothers Menswear. He and his wife Frances raised two sons and two daughters.

== Municipal politics ==
In 1946, he was elected as an alderman for the city of Hanover and was elected mayor in 1948.

== Federal politics ==
He was elected to the House of Commons of Canada in the riding of Grey—Bruce in the 1957 federal election. A Progressive Conservative, he was re-elected in 1958, 1962, 1963, and 1965. From 1963 to 1967, he was the Chief Opposition Whip.

== Provincial politics ==
In 1967, he was elected to the Legislative Assembly of Ontario in the riding of Grey South. When Bill Davis became Premier in March 1971 he named Winkler as Minister of Revenue to his new cabinet.

He was re-elected during the fall election in 1971. Early in 1972, he was named Minister of Financial and Commercial Affairs. In the fall of 1972 a minor cabinet shuffle saw Winkler moved to Chair of Management Board where he stayed for the next three years.

In the fall election in 1975 he was defeated for by Liberal candidate Bob McKessock by 298 votes.

=== Cabinet posts ===
Davis ministry, Province of Ontario (1971–1985)
Cabinet posts (3)
Predecessor	Office	Successor
Charles MacNaughton	Chair of the Management Board of Cabinet; 1972–1975	James Auld
Gordon Carton	Minister of Financial and Commercial Affairs (Note: The ministry was renamed as Consumer and Commercial Relations in April 1972.); 1972 (February–September)	John Clement
John White	Minister of Revenue; 1971–1972	Arthur Meen

== Later life ==
He served as a member of the Ontario Racing Commission in the 1980s. He died at home after a long illness. He was 75.
