= Grey—Bruce =

Former federal electoral district in Ontario, Canada

Ontario electoral district

Defunct federal electoral district
- Legislature: House of Commons
- District created: 1933
- District abolished: 1966
- First contested: 1935
- Last contested: 1965

Grey—Bruce was a federal electoral district represented in the House of Commons of Canada from 1935 to 1968. It was located in the province of Ontario. This riding was created in 1933 from parts of Bruce South and Grey Southeast ridings.

It consisted of the townships of Artemesia, Bentinck, Egremont, Glenelg, Normanby, Proton and Sullivan in the county of Grey; and the townships of Brant, Carrick and Elderslie in the county of Bruce.

The electoral district was abolished in 1966 when it was redistributed between Bruce, Grey—Simcoe and Wellington—Grey ridings.

== Members of Parliament ==
This riding elected the following members of the House of Commons of Canada:

Parliament	Years	Member	Party
Riding created from Bruce South and Grey Southeast
18th	1935–1940	Agnes Macphail	United Farmers of Ontario–Labour
19th	1940–1945	Walter Edward Harris	Liberal
20th	1945–1949	Walter Edward Harris	Liberal
21st	1949–1953	Walter Edward Harris	Liberal
22nd	1953–1957	Walter Edward Harris	Liberal
23rd	1957–1958	Eric Winkler	Progressive Conservative
24th	1958–1962	Eric Winkler	Progressive Conservative
25th	1962–1963	Eric Winkler	Progressive Conservative
26th	1963–1965	Eric Winkler	Progressive Conservative
27th	1965–1968	Eric Winkler	Progressive Conservative
Riding dissolved into Bruce, Grey—Simcoe and Wellington—Grey

== Election results ==
1935 Canadian federal election
Party	Candidate	Votes
United Farmers of Ontario–Labour	Agnes Macphail	7,210
Liberal	Walter Allan Hall	5,727
Conservative	Lewis G. Campbell	5,100

1940 Canadian federal election
Party	Candidate	Votes
Liberal	Walter Edward Harris	6,389
National Government	Karl Daniel Knechtel	4,944
United Farmers of Ontario–Labour	Agnes Macphail	4,761

1945 Canadian federal election
Party	Candidate	Votes
Liberal	Walter Edward Harris	8,912
Progressive Conservative	John Grierson	7,582
Co-operative Commonwealth	Alfred Sachs	1,127

1949 Canadian federal election
Party	Candidate	Votes
Liberal	Walter Edward Harris	10,528
Progressive Conservative	Frank D. Sawyer	6,051
Co-operative Commonwealth	Rudolph Baltruweit	1,137

1953 Canadian federal election
Party	Candidate	Votes
Liberal	Walter Edward Harris	9,236
Progressive Conservative	Rankin Lorne Carefoot	6,279

1957 Canadian federal election
Party	Candidate	Votes
Progressive Conservative	Eric Winkler	10,707
Liberal	Walter Edward Harris	7,606

1958 Canadian federal election
Party	Candidate	Votes
Progressive Conservative	Eric Winkler	11,878
Liberal	Thomas Stevenson	6,248

1962 Canadian federal election
Party	Candidate	Votes
Progressive Conservative	Eric Winkler	10,514
Liberal	William P. Oswald	7,009
New Democratic	Elzard J. McAsey	763

1963 Canadian federal election
Party	Candidate	Votes
Progressive Conservative	Eric Winkler	10,535
Liberal	Duncan Melvin McCallum	6,981
Social Credit	George D. Watson	566
New Democratic	Elzard Joseph McAsey	399

1965 Canadian federal election
Party	Candidate	Votes
Progressive Conservative	Eric Winkler	10,138
Liberal	William R. Mathseon	5,639
New Democratic	Melvin L. Tebbutt	1,706

== See also ==
- List of Canadian electoral districts
- Historical federal electoral districts of Canada
