= James Hill Hunter =

Canadian politician

Ontario MPP
- In office 1890–1891
- Preceded by: John Blythe
- Succeeded by: Gilbert McKechnie
- In office 1875–1883
- Preceded by: Abram William Lauder
- Succeeded by: John Blythe
- Constituency: Grey South

Personal details
- Born: July 26, 1839 Kilbarchan, Renfrewshire, Scotland
- Died: February 2, 1891 (aged 51) Toronto, Ontario
- Party: Liberal
- Spouse: Kate McDonald (m. 1863)
- Occupation: Merchant

James Hill Hunter (July 26, 1839 – February 2, 1891) was an Ontario merchant and political figure. He represented Grey South in the Legislative Assembly of Ontario as a Liberal from 1875 to 1883 and from 1890 to 1891.

He was born in Kilbarchan, Renfrewshire, Scotland in 1839, the son of Archibald Hunter and Elizabeth Hill, came to Canada West with his family in 1842 and was educated at Goderich and Upper Canada College. He became a merchant at Durham and also served as reeve for Glenelg Township. In 1863, he married Kate McDonald. Hunter died in office in 1891.

== Electoral history ==
1875 Ontario general election: Grey South
Party	Candidate	Votes	%	±%
Liberal	James Hill Hunter	1,017	46.27	+6.19
Independent	J. Nasmith	724	32.94	
Conservative	J. Hopkins	457	20.79	−39.13
Turnout		2,198	69.29	+7.46
Eligible voters		3,172		
Liberal gain from Conservative		Swing		+6.19
Source: Elections Ontario

1879 Ontario general election: Grey South
Party	Candidate	Votes	%	±%
Liberal	James Hill Hunter	1,694	61.49	+15.22
Conservative	J.H. Fahey	1,061	38.51	+17.72
Total valid votes		2,755	73.72	+4.43
Eligible voters		3,737		
Liberal hold		Swing		−1.25
Source: Elections Ontario
