= William Waugh Lauder =

Canadian pianist, music critic, teacher and virtuoso (1858–1931)

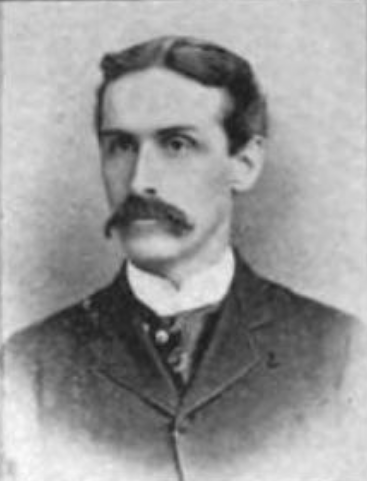
William Waugh Lauder

William Waugh Lauder (1858 – 1931) was a Canadian pianist, music critic, teacher, virtuoso, essayist, and lecturer.

== Early life and education ==
William Waugh Lauder was born in Oshawa, United Province of Canada, in 1858. (Note: According to Liszt, Saffle, & Street-Klindworth, Lauder was born in 1856.) He was of Scotch, Huguenot and German descent— Armstrong ("Belted Will") and Brechleugh, Scotch; the historian Grotius, German; the Huguenot noble De Toof, French. His parents were, Abram William Lauder a parliamentarian and barrister; and Maria Elise Turner Lauder, a travel writer.

His mother was Lauder's sole teacher until he was eleven years old. After traveling in Europe with his parents, he became a pupil of Franz Liszt.

== Career ==
Lauder was pianist of the Toronto, Canada, "Philharmonic Society"; leader of the Anglican Choir of Leipzig, Saxony; member of the "Riedel Verein" of Leipzig; of the St. Caecilia Society of Rome, Italy. He trained choruses in Bloomington, Cincinnati, and London. He served as director of music of Helmuth College, Canada; of Eureka College, Illinois; of Cincinnati Wesleyan College, and Ohio Conservatory of Music, Cincinnati; and Professor of the New England Conservatory of Boston. He was a leading critic, teacher and virtuoso of Chicago; special critical correspondent to the Musical Courier from Chicago for the World's Columbian Exposition, and organist and choirmaster of the Central Church of Christ, Chicago.
