= John Wintermeyer =

Canadian politician (1916–1993)

Ontario MPP
- In office 1955–1963
- Preceded by: Stanley Francis Leavine
- Succeeded by: Keith Butler
- Constituency: Waterloo North

Ontario Liberal Party Leader
- In office 1958–1963
- Preceded by: Farquhar Oliver
- Succeeded by: Andrew Thompson (Note: Farquhar Oliver was interim leader from 1963 to 1964 until a leadership convention was held to elect Thompson.)

Leader of the Official Opposition
- In office 1958–1963
- Preceded by: Farquhar Oliver
- Succeeded by: Farquhar Oliver

Personal details
- Born: December 4, 1916 Kitchener, Ontario
- Died: December 20, 1993 (aged 77) Kitchener, Ontario
- Party: Liberal
- Spouse(s): Helen Delaney (m. 1944-1972); Elizabeth Ann Lang Greene (m. 1980)
- Children: 7
- Occupation: Lawyer

John Joseph Wintermeyer (December 4, 1916 – December 20, 1993) was a politician in Ontario, Canada. He was a Liberal member of the Legislative Assembly of Ontario from 1955 to 1963 who represented the riding of Waterloo North. From 1958 to 1963 he served as leader of the Liberal party.

== Background ==
Wintermeyer was born and raised in Kitchener, Ontario. His parents were Alfred and Caroline Wintermeyer. He attended University of Notre Dame in South Bend, Indiana and graduated with a degree in Commerce and Philosophy in 1939. He then went to Harvard Law School and later Dalhousie Law School. He became a lawyer and returned to his home town to begin his practice. In 1949 he established his own firm which became known as Wintermeyer Askin Casey Smith. In 1944, he marry Helen Delaney and together they raised seven children. After Helen died in 1972, he married Elizabeth Ann Lang Greene in 1980.

== Politics ==
Wintermeyer enter politics as a municipal alderman for Kitchener City Council. He served three terms before moving to provincial politics.

In the 1955 provincial election, Wintermeyer ran as the Liberal candidate in the riding of Waterloo North. He defeated Progressive Conservative incumbent Stanley Francis Leavine by 2,264 votes. and was chosen leader of the Ontario Liberal Party at the 1958 Ontario Liberal Party leadership convention.

In the 1959 election, the Liberals under Wintermeyer's leadership increased their legislative caucus from 10 to 21, but were unable to prevent the ruling Ontario Progressive Conservative Party of Premier Leslie Frost from winning another majority. In the campaign, Wintermeyer promoted policies such as universal medicare, improvements to general welfare assistance, amalgamation of the various municipalities that made up Metropolitan Toronto, and full funding of Catholic schools. Wintermeyer had long been an advocate of a provincial sales tax, which put him in a difficult position when the Frost government introduced a 3% retail sales tax in 1961. While Wintermeyer personally supported the tax, his caucus did not, and he was forced to publicly renounce his support.

In the 1963 election, the Liberals increased their total seats by two, but Wintermeyer lost his seat of Waterloo North, and he resigned as party leader. He was succeeded as party leader by Andy Thompson.

== Later life ==
After leaving politics, He served as director of television station CKCO in Kitchener and was also a director at Kent Trust until it merged with Metropolitan Trust. He served as chairman of the board of Bauer Industries and director of York Centre Corporation. He also served as chair of the Metro Toronto Roman Catholic high schools and the Canadian Olympic Association. He died in 1993 after suffering from Lou Gehrig's disease.
