= David McNicol (politician) =

Canadian politician (1833–1927)

Ontario MPP
- In office 1894–1898
- Preceded by: Gilbert McKechnie
- Succeeded by: David Jamieson
- Constituency: Grey South

Personal details
- Born: 1833 Lamlash, Isle of Arran, Scotland
- Died: 1927 Grey County, Ontario
- Party: Patron

David McNicol (1833 – 1927) was a Scottish-born Ontario farmer and political figure. He represented Grey South in the Legislative Assembly of Ontario from 1894 to 1898 as a Patrons of Industry member.

He was born in Lamlash on the Isle of Arran, the son of John McNicol, and was educated there. McNicol served as reeve of Bentinck Township, near Hanover, Ontario from 1876 to 1886 and was warden for Grey County in 1883.
