= Grey South (provincial electoral district) =

Electoral riding in Ontario, Canada

Ontario electoral district

Defunct provincial electoral district
- Legislature: Legislative Assembly of Ontario
- District created: 1867
- District abolished: 1996
- First contested: 1867
- Last contested: 1995

Grey South was an electoral riding in Ontario, Canada. It was created in 1867 at the time of confederation and was abolished in 1996 before the 1999 election.

The riding was known as Grey from 1974 to 1987, and Grey—Owen Sound from 1987 to 1999.

== Members of Provincial Parliament ==
Grey South
Assembly	Years	Member	Party
1st	1867–1871	Abram William Lauder	Conservative
2nd	1871–1875	Abram William Lauder	Conservative
3rd	1875–1879	James Hill Hunter	Liberal
4th	1879–1883	James Hill Hunter	Liberal
5th	1883–1886	John Blythe	Conservative
6th	1886–1890	John Blythe	Conservative
7th	1890–1891	James Hill Hunter	Liberal
7th	1891–1894	Gilbert McKechnie	Liberal
8th	1894–1898	David McNicol	Patrons of Industry
9th	1898–1902	David Jamieson	Conservative
10th	1902–1905	David Jamieson	Conservative
11th	1905–1908	David Jamieson	Conservative
12th	1908–1911	David Jamieson	Conservative
13th	1911–1914	David Jamieson	Conservative
14th	1914–1919	David Jamieson	Conservative
15th	1919–1923	George Mansfield Leeson	United Farmers
16th	1923–1926	David Jamieson	Conservative
17th	1926–1929	Farquhar Oliver (Note: Oliver switched to the Liberal Party on February 24, 1941.)	United Farmers
18th	1929–1934	Farquhar Oliver	United Farmers
19th	1934–1937	Farquhar Oliver	United Farmers
20th	1937–1943	Farquhar Oliver	United Farmers
21st	1943–1945	Farquhar Oliver	Liberal
22nd	1945–1948	Farquhar Oliver	Liberal
23rd	1948–1951	Farquhar Oliver	Liberal
24th	1951–1955	Farquhar Oliver	Liberal
25th	1955–1959	Farquhar Oliver	Liberal
26th	1959–1963	Farquhar Oliver	Liberal
27th	1963–1967	Farquhar Oliver	Liberal
28th	1967–1971	Eric Winkler	Progressive Conservative
29th	1971–1975	Eric Winkler	Progressive Conservative
Grey
30th	1975–1977	Bob McKessock	Liberal
31st	1977–1981	Bob McKessock	Liberal
32nd	1981–1985	Bob McKessock	Liberal
33rd	1985–1987	Bob McKessock	Liberal
Grey—Owen Sound
34th	1987–1990	Ron Lipsett	Liberal
35th	1990–1995	Bill Murdoch	Progressive Conservative
36th	1995–1999	Bill Murdoch	Progressive Conservative
Sourced from the Ontario Legislative Assembly
Merged into Bruce—Grey—Owen Sound and Dufferin—Peel—Wellington—Grey

== Election results ==
=== Grey—Owen Sound (1987–1999) ===
1995 Ontario general election: Grey—Owen Sound
Party	Candidate	Votes	%	±%
Progressive Conservative	Bill Murdoch	25,138	63.21	+27.10
Liberal	Everett Hall	8,262	20.78	–6.18
New Democratic	Greg Cooper	3,413	8.58	–21.06
Family Coalition	David Black	2,082	5.24	–0.43
Independent	Michael Schmidt	703	1.77	–
Natural Law	Ian Roberts	170	0.43	–
Total valid votes		39,768	99.33	
Total rejected, unmarked and declined ballots		267	0.67	–0.13
Turnout		40,035	65.58	+0.38
Eligible voters		61,048		
Progressive Conservative hold		Swing		+16.64
Source: Elections Ontario

1990 Ontario general election: Grey—Owen Sound
Party	Candidate	Votes	%	±%
Progressive Conservative	Bill Murdoch	13,742	36.11	+0.31
New Democratic	Peggy Hutchison	11,280	29.64	+12.49
Liberal	Ron Lipsett	10,257	26.95	–14.45
Family Coalition	John Ross	2,157	5.67	+0.03
Green	Don Cianci	476	1.25	–
Libertarian	Oleh Stebelskyj	144	0.38	–
Total valid votes		38,056	99.21	
Total rejected, unmarked and declined ballots		304	0.79	+0.36
Turnout		38,360	65.20	+1.03
Eligible voters		58,837		
Progressive Conservative gain from Liberal		Swing		–6.09
Source: Elections Ontario

1987 Ontario general election: Grey—Owen Sound
Party	Candidate	Votes	%	±%
Liberal	Ron Lipsett	14,298	41.41	–
Progressive Conservative	Bill Murdoch	12,364	35.80	–
New Democratic	Cathy Hird	5,924	17.16	–
Family Coalition	Tom Clark	1,946	5.64	–
Total valid votes		34,532	99.56	
Total rejected ballots		151	0.44	–
Turnout		34,683	64.16	–
Eligible voters		54,053		
Liberal hold		Swing		–
Source: Elections Ontario

=== Grey (1975–1987) ===
1985 Ontario general election: Grey
Party	Candidate	Votes	%	±%
Liberal	Bob McKessock	16,061	65.17	+9.71
Progressive Conservative	Case Vanderham	5,875	23.84	–12.74
New Democratic	Rhonda Green	2,402	9.75	+2.97
Libertarian	Eric Biggins	306	1.24	+0.06
Total valid votes		24,644	99.66	
Total rejected ballots		85	0.34	+0.03
Turnout		24,729	63.44	–1.26
Eligible voters		38,981		
Liberal hold		Swing		+11.22
Source: Elections Ontario

1981 Ontario general election: Grey
Party	Candidate	Votes	%	±%
Liberal	Bob McKessock	13,334	55.47	+0.07
Progressive Conservative	John Young	8,793	36.58	+7.88
New Democratic	Joan Stone	1,629	6.78	–9.14
Libertarian	Eric Biggins	284	1.18	–
Total valid votes		24,040	99.68	
Total rejected ballots		76	0.32	+0.09
Turnout		24,116	64.70	–8.02
Eligible voters		37,273		
Liberal hold		Swing		–3.91
Source: Elections Ontario

1977 Ontario general election: Grey
Party	Candidate	Votes	%	±%
Liberal	Bob McKessock	14,651	55.39	+10.37
Progressive Conservative	Fred Taylor	7,589	28.69	–15.26
New Democratic	Walter Miller	4,210	15.92	+4.89
Total valid votes		26,450	99.78	
Total rejected ballots		59	0.22	–0.00
Turnout		26,509	72.72	–1.03
Eligible voters		36,455		
Liberal hold		Swing		+12.82
Source: Elections Ontario

1975 Ontario general election: Grey
Party	Candidate	Votes	%	±%
Liberal	Bob McKessock	11,686	45.02	–
Progressive Conservative	Eric Winkler	11,409	43.95	–
New Democratic	Colin L. Swan	2,863	11.03	–
Total valid votes		25,958	99.78	
Total rejected ballots		58	0.22	–
Turnout		26,016	73.75	–
Eligible voters		35,278		
Liberal gain from Progressive Conservative		Swing		–
Source: Elections Ontario

=== Grey South (1867–1975) ===
1971 Ontario general election
Party	Candidate	Votes	%	±%
Progressive Conservative	Eric Winkler	10,285	54.91	–4.77
Liberal	Curt Greenleaf	5,415	28.91	–3.08
New Democratic	James E. Stevenson	3,029	16.17	+8.60
Total valid votes		18,729	99.66	
Total rejected ballots		64	0.34	–0.23
Turnout		18,793	77.15	+6.13
Eligible voters		24,358		
Progressive Conservative hold		Swing		–0.84
Source: Elections Ontario

1967 Ontario general election
Party	Candidate	Votes	%	±%
Progressive Conservative	Eric Winkler	8,872	59.68	+16.06
Liberal	Lindsay Inglis	4,756	31.99	–20.07
New Democratic	Walter Aiken	1,126	7.57	–
Independent	Charles Giles	111	0.75	–
Total valid votes		14,865	99.43	
Total rejected ballots		85	0.57	–0.26
Turnout		14,950	71.02	+3.82
Eligible voters		21,049		
Progressive Conservative gain from Liberal		Swing		+18.06
Source: Elections Ontario

1963 Ontario general election
Party	Candidate	Votes	%	±%
Liberal	Farquhar Oliver	5,459	52.06	–0.36
Progressive Conservative	Fred T. O'Brecht	4,574	43.62	–3.95
Social Credit	William Nixon	452	4.31	–
Total valid votes		10,485	99.17	
Total rejected ballots		88	0.83	+0.20
Turnout		10,573	67.21	–7.80
Eligible voters		15,732		
Liberal hold		Swing		+1.79
Source: Elections Ontario

1959 Ontario general election
Party	Candidate	Votes	%	±%
Liberal	Farquhar Oliver	6,106	52.43	+0.84
Progressive Conservative	William Harry Kress	5,541	47.57	+8.29
Total valid votes		11,647	99.37	
Total rejected ballots		74	0.63	+0.30
Turnout		11,721	75.01	–6.47
Eligible voters		15,626		
Liberal hold		Swing		–3.72
Source: Elections Ontario

1955 Ontario general election
Party	Candidate	Votes	%	±%
Liberal	Farquhar Oliver	6,800	51.58	+2.14
Progressive Conservative	William Harry Kress	5,179	39.29	–2.74
Co-operative Commonwealth	Elgin McCutcheon	1,204	9.13	+0.60
Total valid votes		13,183	99.67	
Total rejected ballots		44	0.33	+0.03
Turnout		13,227	81.48	+4.64
Eligible voters		16,233		
Liberal hold		Swing		+2.44
Source: Elections Ontario

1951 Ontario general election
Party	Candidate	Votes	%	±%
Liberal	Farquhar Oliver	6,256	49.44	–11.83
Progressive Conservative	William Harry Kress	5,317	42.02	+11.23
Co-operative Commonwealth	Earl Roy Patterson	1,080	8.54	+2.55
Total valid votes		12,653	99.69	
Total rejected ballots		39	0.31	–0.17
Turnout		12,692	76.84	+4.93
Eligible voters		16,517		
Liberal hold		Swing		–11.53
Source: Elections Ontario

1948 Ontario general election
Party	Candidate	Votes	%	±%
Liberal	Farquhar Oliver	7,822	61.28	+8.62
Progressive Conservative	Howard A. McCauley	3,930	30.79	–9.55
Co-operative Commonwealth	Alice Katool	764	5.99	–1.02
Union of Electors	Arnold E. Russell	249	1.95	–
Total valid votes		12,765	99.52	
Total rejected ballots		61	0.48	+0.04
Turnout		12,826	71.91	+0.75
Eligible voters		17,835		
Liberal hold		Swing		+9.08
Source: Elections Ontario

1945 Ontario general election
Party	Candidate	Votes	%	±%
Liberal	Farquhar Oliver	6,584	52.66	+2.20
Progressive Conservative	Howard A. McCauley	5,043	40.33	+10.23
Co-operative Commonwealth	Alice Katool	876	7.01	–12.43
Total valid votes		12,503	99.56	
Total rejected ballots		55	0.44	–0.01
Turnout		12,558	71.16	+7.79
Eligible voters		17,647		
Liberal hold		Swing		–4.02
Source: Elections Ontario

1943 Ontario general election
Party	Candidate	Votes	%	±%
Liberal	Farquhar Oliver	5,617	50.46	–
Progressive Conservative	Albert Edward Calgan	3,351	30.10	–
Co-operative Commonwealth	Helen Martha Carefoot	2,164	19.44	–
Total valid votes		11,132	99.55	
Total rejected ballots		50	0.45	–
Turnout		11,182	63.37	–
Eligible voters		17,646		
Liberal hold		Swing		–
Source: Elections Ontario

Ontario provincial by-election, February 24, 1941 Ministerial By-election
Party	Candidate	Votes
Liberal	Farquhar Oliver	acclaimed
Source: Elections Ontario

1937 Ontario general election
Party	Candidate	Votes	%	±%
United Farmers	Farquhar Oliver	7,296	54.95	–4.72
Conservative	David B. Jamieson	5,982	45.05	+4.72
Total valid votes		13,278	99.53	
Total rejected ballots		63	0.47	–0.22
Turnout		13,341	71.71	–1.74
Eligible voters		18,603		
United Farmers hold		Swing		–4.72
Source: Elections Ontario

1934 Ontario general election
Party	Candidate	Votes	%	±%
United Farmers	Farquhar Oliver	8,301	59.66	+6.60
Conservative	H. Winslow Kernahan	5,612	40.34	–6.60
Total valid votes		13,913	99.31	
Total rejected ballots		97	0.69	+0.16
Turnout		14,010	73.46	+2.38
Eligible voters		19,072		
United Farmers hold		Swing		+6.60
Source: Elections Ontario

1929 Ontario general election
Party	Candidate	Votes	%	±%
United Farmers	Farquhar Oliver	6,607	53.07	–1.38
Conservative	John Nelson Perdue	5,843	46.93	+1.38
Total valid votes		12,450	99.46	
Total rejected ballots		67	0.54	+0.16
Turnout		12,517	71.08	–1.08
Eligible voters		17,610		
United Farmers hold		Swing		–1.38
Source: Elections Ontario

1926 Ontario general election
Party	Candidate	Votes	%	±%
United Farmers	Farquhar Oliver	7,100	54.45	+6.22
Conservative	David Jamieson	5,940	45.55	–6.22
Total valid votes		13,040	99.63	
Total rejected ballots		49	0.37	–0.21
Turnout		13,089	72.16	+6.23
Eligible voters		18,140		
United Farmers gain from Conservative		Swing		+6.22
Source: Elections Ontario

1923 Ontario general election
Party	Candidate	Votes	%	±%
Conservative	David Jamieson	4,553	51.77	+6.76
United Farmers	George Mansfield Leeson	4,241	48.23	–6.76
Total valid votes		8,794	99.41	
Total rejected ballots		52	0.59	–0.25
Turnout		8,846	65.93	–9.94
Eligible voters		13,418		
Conservative gain from United Farmers		Swing		+6.76
Source: Elections Ontario

1919 Ontario general election
Party	Candidate	Votes	%	±%
United Farmers	George Mansfield Leeson	5,252	54.99	–
Conservative	David Jamieson	4,299	45.01	–15.77
Total valid votes		9,551	99.16	
Total rejected ballots		81	0.84	+0.42
Turnout		9,632	75.87	–0.79
Eligible voters		12,696		
United Farmers gain from Conservative		Swing		–
Source: Elections Ontario

1914 Ontario general election
Party	Candidate	Votes	%	±%
Conservative	David Jamieson	2,866	60.78	+6.46
Liberal	Charles Ramage	1,849	39.22	–6.46
Total valid votes		4,715	99.58	
Total rejected ballots		20	0.42	–0.12
Turnout		4,735	76.66	+6.70
Eligible voters		6,177		
Conservative hold		Swing		+6.46
Source: Elections Ontario

1911 Ontario general election
Party	Candidate	Votes	%	±%
Conservative	David Jamieson	2,281	54.32	+1.28
Liberal	William Calder	1,918	45.68	–1.28
Total valid votes		4,199	99.46	
Total rejected ballots		23	0.54	+0.13
Turnout		4,222	69.96	–3.20
Eligible voters		6,035		
Conservative hold		Swing		+1.28
Source: Elections Ontario

1908 Ontario general election
Party	Candidate	Votes	%	±%
Conservative	David Jamieson	2,187	53.04	–1.69
Liberal	Neil McCannell	1,936	46.96	+1.69
Total valid votes		4,123	99.59	
Total rejected ballots		17	0.41	+0.04
Turnout		4,140	73.16	+1.59
Eligible voters		5,659		
Conservative hold		Swing		–1.69
Source: Elections Ontario

1905 Ontario general election
Party	Candidate	Votes	%	±%
Conservative	David Jamieson	2,372	54.73	–0.06
Liberal	J. McKechnie	1,962	45.27	+0.06
Total valid votes		4,334	99.63	
Total rejected ballots		16	0.37	–0.37
Turnout		4,350	71.57	–1.80
Eligible voters		6,078		
Conservative hold		Swing		–0.06
Source: Elections Ontario

1902 Ontario general election
Party	Candidate	Votes	%	±%
Conservative	David Jamieson	2,503	54.79	+7.45
Liberal	George Binnie	2,065	45.21	+9.06
Total valid votes		4,568	99.26	
Total rejected ballots		34	0.74	+0.59
Turnout		4,602	73.37	–2.10
Eligible voters		6,272		
Conservative hold		Swing		+8.25
Source: Elections Ontario

1898 Ontario general election
Party	Candidate	Votes	%	±%
Conservative	David Jamieson	2,249	47.35	–
Liberal	J. D. Morgan	1,717	36.15	–4.02
Independent	David McNicol	784	16.51	–43.33
Total valid votes		4,750	99.85	
Total rejected ballots		7	0.15	–0.64
Turnout		4,757	75.47	+6.18
Eligible voters		6,303		
Conservative gain from Patrons of Industry		Swing		+2.01
Source: Elections Ontario

1894 Ontario general election
Party	Candidate	Votes	%	±%
Patrons of Industry	David McNicol	2,401	59.83	–
Liberal	Gilbert McKechnie	1,612	40.17	–
Total valid votes		4,013	99.21	
Total rejected ballots		32	0.79	–
Turnout		4,045	69.29	–
Eligible voters		5,838		
Patrons of Industry gain from Liberal		Swing		–
Source: Elections Ontario

Ontario provincial by-election, 1891 Death of James Hill Hunter
Party	Candidate	Votes
Liberal	Gilbert McKechnie	acclaimed
Source: Elections Ontario

1890 Ontario general election
Party	Candidate	Votes	%	±%
Liberal	James Hill Hunter	2,156	51.73	+4.95
Conservative	John Blythe	2,012	48.27	–4.95
Total valid votes		4,168	99.45	
Total rejected ballots		23	0.55	–0.24
Turnout		4,191	72.98	+1.81
Eligible voters		5,743		
Liberal gain from Conservative		Swing		+4.95
Source: Elections Ontario

1886 Ontario general election
Party	Candidate	Votes	%	±%
Conservative	John Blythe	2,087	53.23	+0.26
Liberal	Mr. Irvin	1,834	46.77	–0.26
Total valid votes		3,921	99.22	
Total rejected ballots		31	0.78	+0.19
Turnout		3,952	71.17	–3.45
Eligible voters		5,553		
Conservative hold		Swing		+0.26
Source: Elections Ontario

1883 Ontario general election
Party	Candidate	Votes	%	±%
Conservative	John Blythe	1,596	52.97	+14.46
Liberal	James Hill Hunter	1,417	47.03	–14.46
Total valid votes		3,013	99.41	
Total rejected ballots		18	0.59	+0.59
Turnout		3,031	74.62	+0.90
Eligible voters		4,062		
Conservative gain from Liberal		Swing		+14.46
Source: Elections Ontario

1879 Ontario general election
Party	Candidate	Votes	%	±%
Liberal	James Hill Hunter	1,694	61.49	+15.22
Conservative	J.H. Fahey	1,061	38.51	+17.72
Total valid votes		2,755	73.72	+4.43
Eligible voters		3,737		
Liberal hold		Swing		−1.25
Source: Elections Ontario

1875 Ontario general election
Party	Candidate	Votes	%	±%
Liberal	James Hill Hunter	1,017	46.27	+6.19
Independent	J. Nasmith	724	32.94	
Conservative	J. Hopkins	457	20.79	−39.13
Turnout		2,198	69.29	+7.46
Eligible voters		3,172		
Liberal gain from Conservative		Swing		+6.19
Source: Elections Ontario

Ontario provincial by-election, January 1872 Previous election voided
Party	Candidate	Votes	%	±%
Conservative	Abram William Lauder	1,670	52.37	−0.86
Independent	Mr. Dickey	1,519	47.63	
Total valid votes		3,189	100.0	+1.33
Conservative hold		Swing		−0.86
Source: History of the Electoral Districts, Legislatures and Ministries of the Province of Ontario

1871 Ontario general election
Party	Candidate	Votes	%
Conservative	Abram William Lauder	1,625	59.92
Liberal	Mr. McFayden	1,087	40.08
Turnout		2,712	61.83
Eligible voters		4,386	
Election voided
Source: Elections Ontario

1867 Ontario general election
Party	Candidate	Votes	%
Conservative	Abram William Lauder	1,675	53.23
Liberal	William Kingston Flesher	1,472	46.77
Total valid votes		3,147	80.86
Eligible voters		3,892	
Conservative pickup new district.			
Source: Elections Ontario
