= Farquhar Oliver =

Canadian politician

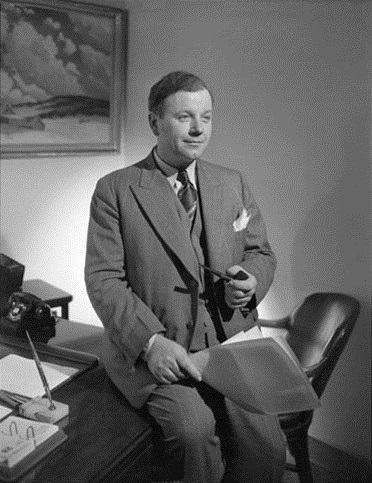
- Farquhar Oliver, 1948

Leader of the Official Opposition
- In office October 1963 – September 1964
- Preceded by: John Wintermeyer
- Succeeded by: Andy Thompson
- In office 1951 – April 1958
- Preceded by: Ted Jolliffe
- Succeeded by: John Wintermeyer
- In office July 1945 – June 1948
- Preceded by: Ted Jolliffe
- Succeeded by: Ted Jolliffe

Leader of the Ontario Liberal Party
- In office April 9, 1954 – April 20, 1958
- Preceded by: Walter Thomson
- Succeeded by: John Wintermeyer
- In office July 4, 1945 – November 10, 1950
- Preceded by: Mitchell Hepburn
- Succeeded by: Walter Thomson

Member of the Legislative Assembly of Ontario for Grey South
- In office 1926–1967
- Preceded by: David Jamieson
- Succeeded by: Eric Winkler

Personal details
- Born: Farquhar Robert Oliver; March 6, 1904 Priceville, Ontario
- Died: January 22, 1989 (aged 84) Owen Sound, Ontario
- Party: Ontario Liberal Party (1941–1967)
- Other political affiliations: United Farmers of Ontario (1926–1941)
- Cabinet: Deputy Premier (1942-1943), Minister of Public Works (1941–1942 & 1943); Minister of Public Welfare (1941–1942 & 1943)

Farquhar Robert Oliver (March 6, 1904 – January 22, 1989) was a politician in Ontario, Canada.

Oliver was elected to the Legislative Assembly of Ontario as a United Farmers of Ontario Member of the Legislative Assembly in the 1926 provincial election at the age of 22.

Oliver was re-elected as a UFO MLA in the 1929 election and was the sole (and last) United Farmers member in the legislature until 1941. In that year, he formally joined the Ontario Liberal Party and the cabinet of Premier Mitchell Hepburn as Minister of Public Works and Welfare after informally supporting the Liberals and attending their caucus meetings since 1934. Oliver quit the cabinet in late October 1942, in protest against Hepburn's leadership of the Liberal Party. Hepburn had quit as Premier of Ontario but refused to resign as leader, and appointed Gordon Daniel Conant as the new Premier without consulting the party. Oliver's resignation contributed to a crisis that eventually led to both Hepburn and Conant's resignations and a leadership convention in May 1943. Harry Nixon was elected the party's new leader. Oliver rejoined the cabinet under new Premier Harry Nixon as Deputy Premier, but Nixon's government was short-lived, going down to defeat in the October 1943 election placing third behind the victorious Progressive Conservatives and the Co-operative Commonwealth Federation which became the Official Opposition.

Oliver became the party's acting leader in the legislature in 1945, after Hepburn, who had regained the leadership of the party, lost his seat in the 1945 provincial election. The Liberals, nevertheless, displaced the CCF and Oliver became Leader of the Opposition and then permanent leader of the party in 1947 by defeating four other candidates to win the 1947 Ontario Liberal leadership convention with 492 of 661 votes cast. He led the party through the 1948 election that again reduced the Liberals to third place behind the Tories and CCF. Oliver resigned the leadership in 1950 and was replaced by Walter Thomson. However, Thomson was unable to win election to the legislature, so Oliver remained house leader. Oliver became party leader again from 1954 until 1958, including the 1955 election, but resigned due to caucus feuding. MPPs Albert Wren, who had placed second behind Oliver in the 1954 leadership convention, and Arthur Reaume attacked Oliver's leadership of the party as ineffectual and were expelled from caucus in 1957, shortly before Oliver resigned so that a new leadership convention could be held. Despite his experience, he was never able to lead his party to victory. Farquhar Oliver retired from the legislature in 1967 and died in 1989 at the age of 84.

Farquhar Oliver was the nephew of British Columbia Premier John Oliver.
