= 1967 Ontario Liberal Party leadership election =

1967 leadership convention of the Ontario Liberal Party

- Date: 6 January 1967
- Convention: Royal York Hotel, Toronto, Ontario
- Resigning leader: Andy Thompson
- Won by: Robert Nixon
- Ballots: 0
- Candidates: 1

The 1967 Ontario Liberal Party leadership convention was held on 6 January 1967 at the Royal York Hotel in Toronto to choose a permanent leader of the Ontario Liberal Party. Robert Nixon, who had been selected as interim leader by the Liberal caucus in November 1966 following the resignation of Andy Thompson, was acclaimed as party leader.

The convention confirmed Nixon's leadership ahead of the 1967 Ontario general election, which was held later that year. Nixon led the Liberals through three provincial elections and remained leader until 1976.

== Background ==
The Ontario Liberal Party had chosen Andy Thompson as leader at the 1964 leadership convention. Thompson, the MPP for Dovercourt, had defeated Charles Templeton on the sixth ballot and was expected to lead the party into the next provincial election.

In 1966, Thompson resigned the leadership on medical advice after a period of ill health.

The Liberal caucus chose Robert Nixon, the MPP for Brant, as interim leader on 16 November 1966. Nixon suggested Templeton could become permanent leader. Liberal MPP Elmer Sopha, who had supported Templeton in 1964 but had become disillusioned with him, reacted furiously against the suggestion and Templeton announced he would not be a candidate the next day. Hamilton East MP John Munro was also named as a possible candidate but responded saying he was only interested in federal politics.

Nixon was then confirmed as permanent leader at the party's January 1967 convention after the deadline for nominations closed with no other name being submitted.

== Candidate ==
- Robert Nixon – Nixon was the Liberal MPP for Brant and the son of former Ontario premier Harry Nixon. He had first been elected to the legislature in a 1962 by-election following his father's death, and was re-elected in the 1963 Ontario general election. At the time of the 1967 convention, he had already served as interim leader of the party for several weeks. Nixon later served as Leader of the Opposition, and, after the Liberals formed government in 1985, as provincial treasurer and deputy premier in the government of David Peterson.

== Other potential candidates ==
Charles Templeton, who had placed second to Thompson at the 1964 leadership convention, was discussed as a possible candidate but did not run. With no other candidate entering the race, Nixon was acclaimed.

== Ballot results ==
Candidate	Votes	%
Robert Nixon	acclaimed	n/a

== Aftermath ==
Nixon led the Ontario Liberals into the 1967 Ontario general election. The party remained the Official Opposition, winning 27 seats while the Progressive Conservatives under Premier John Robarts were re-elected with a majority government. Nixon continued as leader through the 1971 election. He announced his retirement in 1972, but changed his mind and won the 1973 leadership convention defeating three challengers. He led the party through the 1975 election, which resulted in the Liberals falling to third place with Stephen Lewis's Ontario New Democratic Party becoming Official Opposition. Nixon resigned as party leader and was succeeded by Stuart Smith at the 1976 Ontario Liberal Party leadership election.

Nixon remained an influential Liberal MPP after leaving the leadership. He served in cabinet after the Liberals formed government under David Peterson in 1985, including as treasurer and deputy premier.
