= Charles Templeton =

Canadian writer, editor, and former Christian evangelist (1915–2001)

- Born: Charles Bradley Templeton; October 7, 1915; Toronto, Ontario, Canada
- Died: June 7, 2001 (aged 85); Toronto, Ontario, Canada
- Resting place: Prospect Cemetery, Toronto
- Other name: Chuck
- Education: Parkdale Collegiate Institute; Princeton Theological Seminary
- Occupations: Evangelist, journalist, radio commentator, author, politician, inventor, cartoonist
- Notable work: Farewell to God
- Spouses: Constance Orozco (m. 1939; div. 1957) Sylvia Murphy (m. 1959; div. 1976) Madeleine Helen Stevens Leger (m. 1980)
- Children: Michael, Deborah, Bradley, and Tyrone

Charles Bradley Templeton (October 7, 1915 – June 7, 2001) was a Canadian broadcaster, journalist, novelist, politician, and former Christian evangelist. Known in the 1940s and 1950s as a prominent preacher and an early associate of Billy Graham, he later left evangelism, became an agnostic and then an atheist, and wrote about his rejection of Christianity in Farewell to God. Some Christian writers have cited late-life comments attributed to Templeton about missing Jesus, but these claims have been interpreted in different ways, particularly because Templeton was elderly and suffering from Alzheimer's disease near the end of his life.

== Early life ==
Charles Templeton was born on October 7, 1915, in Toronto, Canada, to Irish immigrants William Loftus Templeton (1889–1972) and Elizabeth Marion Poyntz (1890–1956). After living in Regina, Saskatchewan for more than a decade his family returned to Toronto when he was 12 and he attended high school at Parkdale Collegiate Institute. Templeton's father left Toronto and his family in 1929, onstensibly in search of work, when Charles was 14, and he rarely saw him afterwards. His mother made ends meet during the Depression by taking in boarders to support Charles, his three sisters and younger brother.

== Cartoonist ==
In 1932, at age 17, Charles Templeton was hired to create Chuck Templeton's Sportraits, a daily sports cartoon, for The Toronto Globe (now The Globe and Mail), leaving high school to pursue the job. His work became syndicated and earned him a comfortable living. He converted to Christianity while working as a cartoonist, and in 1936, left his job to become a preacher.

== Christian evangelist ==
After he quit his first job, Templeton became a mass evangelist. From 1936 to 1938, he toured the United States, preaching in 44 states and gaining international recognition as a leading evangelist. In 1941, Templeton started the Nazarene Avenue Road Church where he served as its preacher, renting a building that once housed a Presbyterian church. In 1955, he became the Presbyterian Church in the United States's secretary of evangelism.

Eager to deepen his understanding about Christianity, Templeton attended Princeton Theological Seminary in the 1940s. He later received an honorary doctorate from Lafayette College.

He hosted the religious television show Look Up and Live on CBS.

Templeton began to struggle with doubts about his religion eventually becoming an agnostic. This caused a wide backlash from Christian communities.

Templeton was a close friend of fellow evangelist Billy Graham, and the two shared billing as they co-founded (along with Torrey Johnson) Youth for Christ International. After Templeton became an agnostic, and later an atheist, they remained friends, but became more distant.

Templeton's friendship with Graham and their debate over Templeton's skepticism, is dramatized in the 2008 movie Billy: The Early Years.

=== Religious views ===
Templeton was raised outside formal church life, but converted to Christianity as a young adult and became a prominent evangelist in Canada and the United States. During the 1940s he was associated with Youth for Christ International and was a close friend and preaching colleague of Billy Graham. He later studied at Princeton Theological Seminary and in 1955 became secretary of evangelism for the Presbyterian Church in the United States.

Templeton gradually became troubled by religious doubt, including questions about the problem of suffering and the reliability of Christian doctrine. He left full-time evangelism in 1957 and later described himself first as an agnostic and then as an atheist. In his 1996 book Farewell to God: My Reasons for Rejecting the Christian Faith, Templeton set out the reasons for his rejection of Christianity, while continuing to write about Jesus in admiring terms.

Templeton's attitude toward Jesus became a subject of later discussion among Christian writers. In The Case for Faith, Christian apologist Lee Strobel described interviewing Templeton near the end of Templeton's life. Strobel wrote that Templeton rejected Christian doctrine but spoke emotionally and admiringly about Jesus, saying that he "missed" him. Christian commentators have sometimes cited this passage as suggesting that Templeton retained affection for Jesus or may have had late-life second thoughts about his atheism.

Other accounts caution against treating the anecdote as evidence of a formal return to Christian belief. Templeton's published work remained explicitly skeptical of Christianity, and his son Brad Templeton later wrote that Farewell to God was completed while the first symptoms of Alzheimer's disease were already affecting him. Contemporary obituaries also reported that Templeton died from Alzheimer's disease. For that reason, later claims about his final religious views are generally based on interpretation of reminiscences and interviews rather than on any public recantation of his atheism.

== Media ==
=== Journalism ===
Templeton quit evangelism in 1957 and transitioned into a media career. In 1957, he became an interviewer, alongside Pierre Berton, for the CBC Television show Close-Up in and also appeared on CBC Radio public affairs programmes such as Assignment. He left the CBC in 1959 but continue to work on various CBC programs. From 1959 to 1962 he hosted the historical quiz show Live a Borrowed Life. In 1963, he was an interviewer on the Question Mark, a CBC public affairs show exploring spirituality.

Templeton left the CBC in 1959 when he was hired as executive managing editor of the Toronto Star, a position he held until 1964, when he entered politics.

In 1958, Templeton also worked for syndication service All-Canada Radio, producing ten one-minute news commentaries a week.

He collaborated with Berton again on the radio show Dialogue from 1966 to 1970 on CFRB, and from 1970 to 1983 on CKEY, where Templeton also served as the morning news reader.

In 1965, Templeton was appointed president of the advertising company Technamation Canada, working there until CTV hired him as director of public affairs in 1967. In 1969, he briefly served as editor of Maclean's magazine for seven months.

He won two ACTRA Awards for broadcasting and in 1992, he was awarded the 125th Anniversary of the Confederation of Canada Medal.

=== Author ===
In the late 1950s, Templeton wrote two plays that were performed on CBC Television and were also sold for broadcast on the BBC and the Australian Broadcasting Company. Templeton's first novel, The Kidnapping of the President (1974), became a bestseller and was adapted into a 1980 film. He wrote several other novels. In Farewell to God (1995 or 1996), he described his conversion to agnosticism and explained his reasons for doing so. Templeton also won the B'nai B'rith book award.

== Politics ==
Templeton was the runner-up of the 1964 Ontario Liberal Party leadership election, and was Ontario Liberal Party vice-president in 1964 and 1965.

As a journalist, Templeton had little previous involvement with partisan politics, and faced much criticism from party insiders for being an interloper. In the midst of the leadership campaign, economic development minister Robert Macaulay, a former leadership rival of Premier John Robarts, announced his retirement from politics and vacated his Riverdale seat. Hoping to address the criticism of not having a seat in the legislature and demonstrate to the party that he could deliver electoral success where other Liberals couldn't, Templeton entered the by-election contest. He won the nomination easily by a 90 to 18 vote margin against the Liberal candidate from the 1963 general election. The move however backfired. As Templeton acknowledged in his memoir, Liberal activists from other Toronto ridings, who might in other circumstances have helped, refrained from doing so in order to deny Templeton the momentum boost that would have came with a byelection win.

NDP candidate Jim Renwick's campaign was managed by Gerald Caplan, Stephen Lewis, and Marjorie Pinney who developed what became known as "the Riverdale model" that the NDP would use for decades in which campaign volunteers canvassed every household three or four times, identified all their supporters, and then got out the vote on election day. This system maximized the NDP's vote on election day and increased the overall turnout to over 60%, about one-third higher than the usual turnout for a by-election. The result was an upset victory for Renwick. This campaign system was adopted by the NDP throughout Ontario, and was later copied by other parties.

While the NDP was applying innovation campaign techniques that would later become standard political practice, Templeton was conducting two-front warfare. Running two election campaigns simultaneously proved challenging and Templeton came in third in Riverdale.

Riverdale by-election September 10, 1964
Party	Candidate	Votes	Vote %
New Democrat	Jim Renwick	7,326	38.7
Progressive Conservative	Kenneth Waters	5,782	30.5
Liberal	Charles Templeton	5,738	30.3
Independent	Fred Graham	92	0.5
	Total	18,938	

Having lost the byelection and incurred significant debt from the campaign, Templeton initially announced his withdrawal from the leadership contest but reversed his decision later on his supporters' urging. He surprised most observers with a strong second-place finish on the first ballot. As the outsider candidate, he had little room for growth however. While he gained a proportionate share in the two subsequent ballots, his lack of subsequent ballot support became evident when the more established candidates were eliminated. Between the third and fifth ballots Templeton gained only twenty-three votes, while the frontrunner Andy Thompson gained seventy-seven. He was defeated in the sixth ballot by Andy Thompson by a significant margin.

Results of the 1964 Ontario Liberal Party leadership convention

Candidate	1st ballot		2nd ballot		3rd ballot		4th ballot		5th ballot		6th ballot	
Candidate	Votes	%	Votes	%	Votes	%	Votes	%	Votes	%	Votes	%
Andy Thompson	379	27.7	408	29.7	462	33.6	520	38.1	539	39.9	772	58.8
Charles Templeton	317	23.1	356	25.9	396	28.8	422	30.9	419	31.0	540	41.2
Robert Nixon	313	22.8	351	25.6	356	25.9	387	28.3	392	29.0		
Joe Greene	236	17.2	211	15.4	149	10.9	37	2.7				
Victor Copps	61	4.5	27	2.0	10	0.7						
Eddie Sargent	51	3.7	20	1.5								
Joseph Gould	13	0.9										
Total	1,370	100.0	1,373	100.0	1,373	100.0	1,366	100.0	1,350	100.0	1,312	100.0

Thompson would resign as leader two years later due to health problems. Interim Liberal leader Robert Nixon suggested that Templeton could become the party's permanent leader, but Liberal MPP Elmer Sopha, who had been the only MPP who had supported Templeton in 1964 but had become disillusioned with him, reacted furiously against the suggestion and Templeton declined to run in the 1967 leadership convention due to caucus opposition. It has been suggested that Sopha's ire was a result of Templeton never acknowledging Sopha for having raised money for Templeton's 1964 campaign.

== Inventor ==
Templeton made his own unsuccessful designs of a child-resistant medicine cap, a cigarette filter and a pipeline. However, his design for a teddy bear that could stay warm for many hours was widely manufactured.

== Personal life ==
While he was an evangelist, Templeton married fellow evangelist and singer Constance Orozco in 1939. In 1957, they divorced. In 1959, he married singer Sylvia Murphy, whom he met while acting alongside her in a television play A Face to Remember; they divorced in 1976. Templeton and Murphy had two children, internet entrepreneur Brad Templeton, and cartoonist Ty Templeton. Templeton became stepfather to Murphy's two children from an earlier marriage, lawyer Michael Templeton, and broadcaster and producer Deborah Burgess.

In 1980, he married author Madeleine Helen Stevens Leger, and they remained married until his death.

== Death ==
Templeton died in Toronto on June 7, 2001, at the age of 85. Contemporary reports stated that he died from Alzheimer's disease. In later Christian writing, Templeton's final years have sometimes been discussed because of Lee Strobel's account that Templeton became emotional when speaking about Jesus and said that he missed him. The anecdote has been cited by some Christian commentators as evidence of unresolved attachment to Christianity, but no public statement by Templeton recanting his atheism is known, and family accounts emphasize that he was experiencing the effects of Alzheimer's disease during his final years.

== Books ==
=== Novels ===
- The Kidnapping of the President, McClelland & Stewart (Canada) / Simon & Schuster (US) (1974) - adapted into a movie in 1980
- Act of God, McClelland & Stewart (Canada) / Little, Brown (US) (1977)
- The Third Temptation, McClelland & Stewart (1980)
- The Queen's Secret, McClelland & Stewart (1986)
- World of One, McClelland & Stewart (1988)

=== Non-fiction ===
- Evangelism for Tomorrow, Harper & Brothers (1955)
- Life Looks Up, Harper & Brothers (1957)
- Jesus (also titled Jesus: A Bible in Modern English), Simon & Schuster (1973)
- Templeton, Charles (1983). Charles Templeton - An anecdotal memoir. McClelland and Stewart. ISBN 0771085451. (Online version)
- Succeeding: Mastering the Art of Getting Ahead, Stoddart (1989)
- The Winning Edge (later edition of Succeeding), Stoddart (1990)
- End Back Attacks, written with Charles Godfrey, M.D., Key Porter Books (1992)
- Farewell to God: My Reasons for Rejecting the Christian Faith, McClelland & Stewart (1996)
