= 1964 Ontario Liberal Party leadership election =

Canadian provincial party election

- Date: September 17–19, 1964
- Convention: Royal York Hotel, Toronto, Ontario
- Resigning leader: John Wintermeyer
- Won by: Andy Thompson
- Ballots: 6
- Candidates: 7

The 1964 Ontario Liberal Party leadership election, held from September 17 to 19, 1964, elected Andy Thompson as leader of the Ontario Liberal Party. Thompson replaced John Wintermeyer, who had resigned after losing his seat in the 1963 Ontario general election. Thompson won the leadership on the sixth ballot, defeating Charles Templeton in the final round.

== Background ==
The convention was held after the resignation of John Wintermeyer, who had led the party since 1958. In the 1959 Ontario general election, the Liberals under Wintermeyer had increased their caucus, but the party remained well behind the governing Progressive Conservatives. In the 1963 Ontario general election, the Liberals won more seats, but Wintermeyer lost his own riding of Waterloo North and subsequently resigned as leader.

The leadership race attracted seven candidates. Four were members of the Liberal caucus in the Legislative Assembly of Ontario: Thompson, Robert Nixon, Eddie Sargent, and Joseph Gould. The other candidates were Victor Copps, mayor of Hamilton, Ontario; Joe Greene, a federal Liberal member of Parliament; and Templeton, a Toronto journalist, broadcaster, novelist, and former evangelist.

Templeton, who did not hold a seat in the legislature, attempted to improve his position by contesting a provincial by-election in Riverdale on September 10, 1964, one week before the convention. He finished third behind New Democratic candidate Jim Renwick and Progressive Conservative candidate Kenneth Waters in what was considered an upset. The result hurt Templeton's chances at the convention, though he remained one of the main contenders and reached the final ballot.

Thompson had recently become prominent for his opposition to Attorney General Fred Cass's proposed amendments to the Police Act, which critics described as a "police bill" or "police state bill". The convention was held at the Royal York Hotel in Toronto from September 17 to 19, 1964. Thompson led on every ballot and defeated Templeton on the sixth ballot.

== Aftermath ==
Despite interest in the leadership race, the party faced difficult political circumstances. The Progressive Conservatives had governed Ontario continuously since 1943, and the Liberals had not formed government since the defeat of Harry Nixon's short-lived administration. Thompson remained leader for only two years before resigning because of health problems. He was succeeded first on an interim basis, and then permanently, by Robert Nixon. Templeton was suggested as a possible permanent replacement for Thompson but declined to run in the 1967 leadership convention due to opposition by some in the Liberal caucus.

== Candidates ==
- Andy Thompson was the MPP for Dovercourt, first elected in the 1959 Ontario general election. Born in Belfast, Northern Ireland, he worked as a social worker before entering politics. Thompson became known in the legislature for opposing Fred Cass's Police Act amendments and entered the convention as one of the leading caucus candidates. After winning the leadership, he served as leader of the Ontario Liberal Party and Leader of the Opposition until 1966. He was appointed to the Senate of Canada in 1967. He was the focus of controversy in the 1990s due to his continuing to collect his Senate salary while being absent for long periods and living in Mexico.
- Charles Templeton was a journalist, broadcaster, author, former Christian evangelist, and former executive managing editor of the Toronto Star. Earlier in his career, he had been a prominent evangelist and an associate of Billy Graham, but later left evangelism and became known for his work in journalism, radio, television, and writing. Templeton did not hold a legislative seat and ran in the Riverdale by-election shortly before the leadership convention, placing third. He finished second to Thompson on the final leadership ballot.
- Robert Nixon was the MPP for Brant and the son of former premier Harry Nixon. He was first elected to the legislature in a 1962 by-election following his father's death and was re-elected in the 1963 general election. Nixon remained a major contender throughout the balloting and placed third before withdrawing after the fifth ballot. He later served as leader of the Ontario Liberal Party, Treasurer of Ontario, and deputy premier in the government of David Peterson.
- Joe Greene was the federal Liberal MP for Renfrew South, first elected in the 1963 Canadian federal election. A lawyer and veteran of the Royal Canadian Air Force, Greene later served as federal Minister of Agriculture and Minister of Energy, Mines and Resources, and was appointed to the Senate in 1972. Greene had also been a candidate at the 1958 Ontario Liberal Party leadership election and entered the 1964 race as the only sitting federal MP among the candidates.
- Victor Copps was mayor of Hamilton, Ontario. A former broadcaster, he had been elected to Hamilton's Board of Control before becoming mayor in 1962. He served as mayor until 1976 and later became the namesake of the former Copps Coliseum. Copps was eliminated after the third ballot. He is the father of Sheila Copps who was a Liberal MP in the 1980s and 1990s.
- Eddie Sargent was the Liberal MPP for Grey North, elected in the 1963 general election after previously serving for many years as mayor of Owen Sound. Sargent had also been a publisher and businessman. He placed sixth on the first ballot and was eliminated after the second ballot.
- Joseph Gould was the Liberal MPP for Bracondale, first elected in 1959. A Toronto lawyer and former municipal alderman, Gould was supported in the leadership race by federal Liberal politician Paul Hellyer, who represented part of Gould's riding in the House of Commons. Gould finished last on the first ballot and was eliminated.

== Results ==
=== Ballot results ===
Candidate	1st ballot		2nd ballot		3rd ballot		4th ballot		5th ballot		6th ballot	
Candidate	Votes	%	Votes	%	Votes	%	Votes	%	Votes	%	Votes	%
Andy Thompson	379	27.7	408	29.7	462	33.6	520	38.1	539	39.9	772	58.8
Charles Templeton	317	23.1	356	25.9	396	28.8	422	30.9	419	31.0	540	41.2
Robert Nixon	313	22.8	351	25.6	356	25.9	387	28.3	392	29.0		
Joe Greene	236	17.2	211	15.4	149	10.9	37	2.7				
Victor Copps	61	4.5	27	2.0	10	0.7						
Eddie Sargent	51	3.7	20	1.5								
Joseph Gould	13	0.9										
Total	1,370	100.0	1,373	100.0	1,373	100.0	1,366	100.0	1,350	100.0	1,312	100.0
