= A Second Look =

A Second Look may refer to:

- A Second Look (1964 TV program), a 1964 Canadian current affairs television program
- A Second Look (1969 TV series), a 1969 Canadian satirical comedy television series
