= Dante De Monte =

Canadian politician

Dante Matthew De Monte

Ontario MPP
- In office 1967–1971
- Preceded by: Andy Thompson
- Succeeded by: George Adam Nixon
- Constituency: Dovercourt

Personal details
- Born: May 6, 1926 Toronto, Ontario
- Died: October 23, 2009 (aged 83) Toronto, Ontario
- Party: Liberal
- Spouse: Elvira de Monte
- Children: 7
- Occupation: Lawyer

Dante Matthew De Monte QC (May 6, 1926 – October 23, 2009) was a politician in Ontario, Canada. He was a Liberal member in the Legislative Assembly of Ontario from 1967 to 1971 who represented the downtown Toronto riding of Dovercourt.

== Background ==
Born in Toronto, to parents who had emigrated from the Friuli district in Italy, De Monte served in the Royal Canadian Navy during the Second World War and then earned his Bachelor of Arts degree at the University of Toronto and a law degree from the Osgoode Law School in 1955. He opened a law practice in North York and practiced law for over 40 years. An active supporter of a wide variety of social charities, he was particularly closely associated with the Friuli Centre, in Toronto. Married to the late Elvira De Monte, they had seven children. Prior to his election, he had served as the Vice-President of the Toronto and District Liberal Association.

== Politics ==
In the 1967 provincial election, De Monte ran as the Liberal in the riding of Dovercourt. He defeated New Democrat Otto Bressan by 1,586 votes. During the next four years he sat as an opposition supporter for Liberal leader Robert Nixon. In the 1971 election, he was defeated by Progressive Conservative candidate George Nixon, placing a poor third behind New Democrat candidate Steve Penner.
