= Horizon (Canadian TV program) =

- Genre: Current affairs
- Country of origin: Canada
- Original language: English
- No. of seasons: 1

Production
- Executive producer: Jim Guthro

Original release
- Network: CBC Television
- Release: 13 October 1963 – 30 August 1964

Related
- Close-Up

Horizon is a Canadian current affairs television program that aired on CBC Television from 1963 to 1964.

== Premise ==
Most episodes of the program featured documentaries from various producers on various topics, with the notable exception of the fictional treatment in "The Open Grave" which was broadcast during Easter 1964.

== Scheduling ==
This hour-long program was broadcast on alternate Sundays at 10:00 p.m. from 13 October 1963 to 30 August 1964. Let's Face It (1963), A Second Look (1964) and Question Mark (1963–1964) appeared in the time slot on the other Sundays. The program schedule was interrupted for the 1964 National Hockey League playoffs.

== Episodes ==
The broadcasts included these features:

- "The Age of Renewal" (Michael Jacot writer; Tom Koch producer), regarding worldwide renewal of the Christian faith
- "The Age Of Wonder" (Tom Koch director and writer), concerning how youth transition to adulthood.
- "And Then There Were None" (Jim Murray), concerning endangered species
- "Another Canada" (J. Frank Willis host, George Ronald director, Richard Nielsen writer), which examined Canadian poverty. Aired in 1963 and broadcast again in January 1964.
- "Clown Of A Thousand Years" (Jim Guthro producer; Bernard Rothman writer), regarding how modern comedy performers relate to the traditional concept of the clown. Jack Creley, Ron Hartman, Don Francks and Nancy Wickwire appeared in this documentary.
- "Corridors Of Power" (Norman Ward interviewer), on the Parliament of Canada
- "D-Day: The Canadians" (George Ronald producer, director and writer), featuring recollections of the Normandy landings by Canadian World War II veterans
- "Denizens Of Outer Space" (Lister Sinclair), a study of the universe
- "Down From The Trees" (James Murray producer; John R. Napier writer; Lister Sinclair narrator), regarding evolution of mankind. Paleontologist Alfred Romer and Napier himself were among those scientists featured in this documentary.
- "The Many Faces Of Gambling" (John Kennedy producer and writer)
- "The Measure Of Morality", comparing modern and historic morality. Aired 7 June 1964.
- "The Open Grave" (Ron Kelly producer and director; Charles Israel writer), which aired during Easter, a dramatic work regarding a radical leader's death and the disappearance of his body from the grave. Aired on Easter 1964.
- "Picasso", covering the first 65 years of the artist's life
- "The Presumption Of Innocence" (Frank McGee narrator), regarding criminal law administration in Canada
- "Price Of A Future" (Jim Carney director), regarding problems in post-secondary education including the crowding of universities
- "Speed: The Only New Thrill" (James Murray producer; Lister Sinclair writer and narrator), concerning transportation and its modern developments of speed
- "This Time, This Place" (Vincent Tovell producer, Alex Trebek host, Lucio Agostini musical director), featuring chansonniers of Quebec
- "This Was A Man" (Vincent Tovell producer; Lister Sinclair writer; William McCauley music director), regarding William Shakespeare
- "Whither The Party?" (John Kennedy producer; J. Frank Willis host), a historical overview of the Communist Party of Canada
