= Let's Face It (disambiguation) =

Let's Face It is an album by the Mighty Mighty Bosstones.

Let's Face It may also refer to:

- Let's Face It!, a 1941 musical with music and lyrics by Cole Porter and a book by Herbert and Dorothy Fields
- Let's Face It! (film), a 1943 film based on the musical, starring Bob Hope, Betty Hutton, ZaSu Pitts and Eve Arden
- Let's Face It (TV series), a 1963 Canadian TV series
