= George Adam Nixon =

Canadian politician

George Nixon

Ontario MPP
- In office 1971–1975
- Preceded by: Dante De Monte
- Succeeded by: Tony Lupusella
- Constituency: Dovercourt

Personal details
- Born: May 8, 1923 Toronto, Ontario
- Died: September 19, 1998 (aged 75) Toronto, Ontario
- Party: Progressive Conservative
- Spouse: Norma
- Children: 4
- Occupation: Factory foreman

George Adam Nixon (May 8, 1923 – September 19, 1998) was a politician in Ontario, Canada. He was a Progressive Conservative member of the Legislative Assembly of Ontario from 1971 to 1975 who represented the downtown Toronto riding of Dovercourt.

== Background ==
Nixon was born and raised in the Dovercourt neighbourhood in the west end of Toronto, the son of Irish immigrants. He attended Dovercourt Junior Public School and later Central Technical School. Nixon worked for 25 years at Continental Can Company, first as a stock keeper and then as a foreman. He was active in a wide variety of community service activities, including the Baptist Church, the United Appeal, the Cerebral Palsy Association and he was one of the founders of Camp Kwasind for underprivileged children. He and his wife Norma raised four children, one son and three daughters. He died September 19, 1998, of complications of a stroke suffered in May of that same year. He was predeceased by his wife and son.

== Politics ==
Nixon ran in the 1971 provincial election as the Progressive Conservative candidate in the riding of Dovercourt. He defeated NDP candidate Steve Penner by a narrow margin of 55 votes. A recount reduced the margin to 38 votes. The NDP challenged the election but the result held. In 1975 he was defeated by New Democrat candidate Tony Lupusella by 1,465 votes.
