= David Kerr (Ontario politician) =

Canadian politician

David M. Kerr

Ontario MPP
- In office 1951–1959
- Preceded by: George Eamon Park
- Succeeded by: Andy Thompson
- Constituency: Dovercourt

Personal details
- Born: 15 May 1900; Ballyclare, Ireland
- Died: 19 April 1978 (aged 77); Toronto, Ontario, Canada
- Political party: Progressive Conservative
- Spouse: Helen
- Children: 5
- Occupation: Presbyterian minister

David McMaster Kerr (15 May 1900 – 19 April 1978) was a politician in Ontario, Canada. He was a Progressive Conservative member of the Legislative Assembly of Ontario from 1951 to 1959 who represented the downtown Toronto riding of Dovercourt.

== Background ==
Kerr was born in Ballyclare, Ireland on 15 May 1900. He emigrated to Canada in 1925. He graduated from McGill University in 1926 and went on to study at Presbyterian Theological College where he graduated in 1936. He became a Presbyterian minister and worked in small Ontario towns of Shakespeare and Waterloo. He became the pastor of Royce Presbyterian Church in west Toronto in 1941. In 1950 he was appointed as the moderator of the West Toronto Presbytery. He and his wife raised five children.

== Politics ==
McMaster served as a school trustee from 1947 to 1951.

He was elected in the 1951 provincial election in the riding of Dovercourt. He defeated CCF incumbent George Eamon Park by 256 votes. He was re-elected in 1955. He was defeated in the 1959 election by Liberal candidate Andy Thompson by 360 votes. During his time in the legislature he served as a backbench supporter to Premier Leslie Frost. He died in 1978.
