= A Second Look (1964 TV program) =

- Presented by: Gary Lautens
- Country of origin: Canada
- Original language: English
- No. of seasons: 1

Production
- Producer: Barry Harris
- Running time: 30 minutes

Original release
- Network: CBC Television
- Release: 26 January – 9 August 1964

A Second Look is a Canadian current affairs television program that aired on CBC Television in 1964.

== Premise ==
This program, a successor to Let's Face It, reviewed up to three news stories per episode. It was hosted by Gary Lautens, a humour columnist of the Toronto Star.

Guests included British Labour Party parliamentarian Anthony Wedgewood-Benn and American political author Richard Rovere.

== Scheduling ==
The half-hour program aired on alternate Sundays at 10:00 p.m. (Eastern) from 26 January to 9 August 1964, with Horizon broadcast on other weeks. This show was distinct from a 1969 CBC series of the same name.

Lautens, however, lacked television experience while having little say in the production. That, combined with a vague program concept made A Second Look unsuccessful.
