= William Duckworth (Canadian politician) =

Canadian politician

Ontario MPP
- In office 1934–1948
- Preceded by: Samuel Wright
- Succeeded by: George Park
- Constituency: Dovercourt

Personal details
- Born: October 25, 1884 Garafraxa Township, Dufferin County, Ontario
- Died: November 8, 1951 (aged 67)
- Party: Conservative
- Occupation: Farmer, grocery wholesaler

William Duckworth (October 25, 1884 – November 8, 1951) was an Ontario merchant and political figure. He represented Dovercourt in the Legislative Assembly of Ontario from 1934 to 1948 as a Conservative and then Progressive Conservative member.

He was born in Garafraxa Township, Dufferin County, Ontario, the son of Samuel Duckworth, and was educated in Orangeville. He was a farmer in Luther Township for some time before moving to Toronto where he established a wholesale produce business. In 1908, he married a Miss Taylor. Duckworth served on the city council for several years and was a member of the Orange Order.
