= Ty Templeton =

Canadian comic book artist and writer (born 1962)

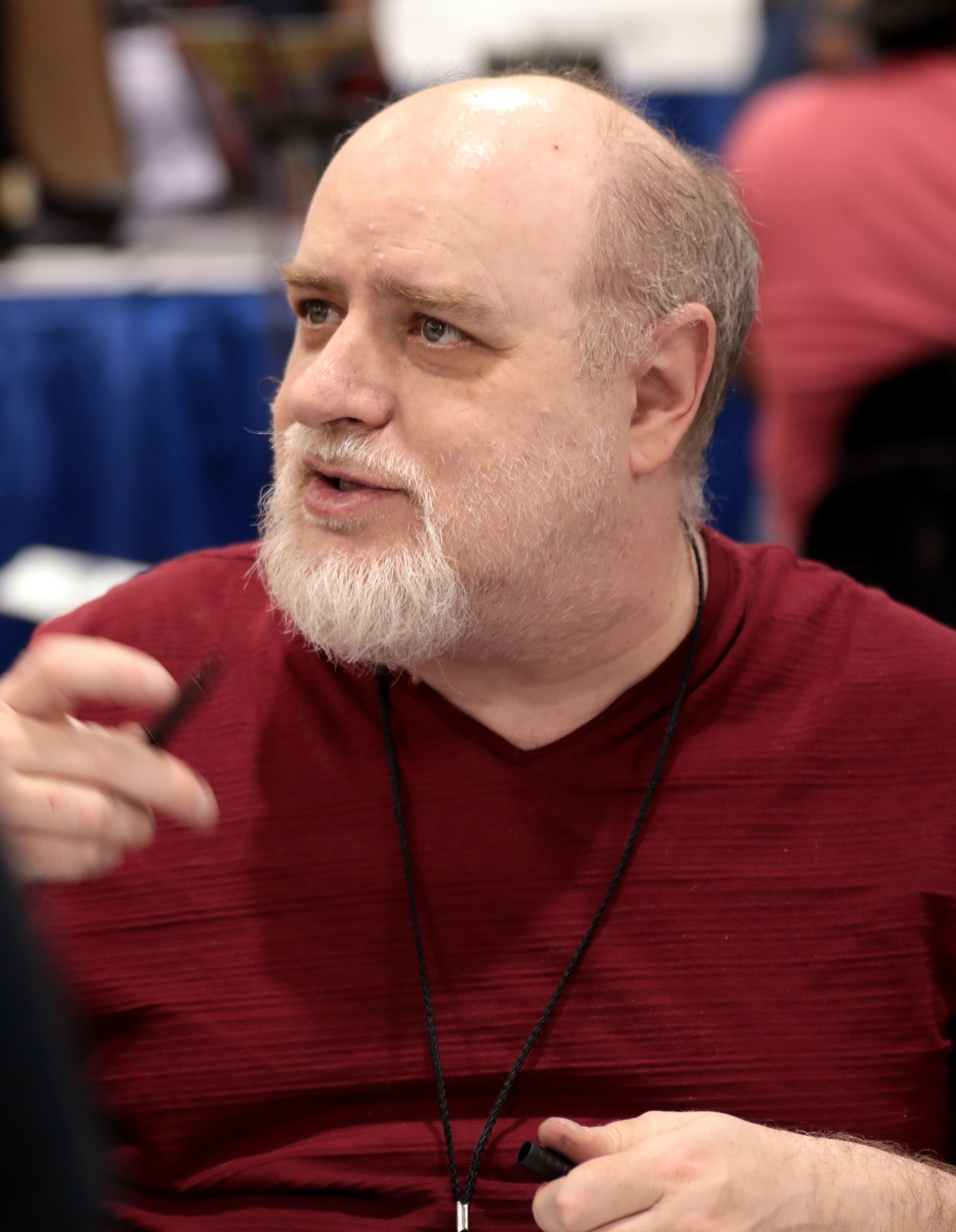
- Templeton in May 2019
- Born: May 9, 1962 (age 64)
- Areas: Cartoonist, Writer, Artist, Letterer

Tyrone Templeton is a Canadian comic book artist and writer who has drawn a number of mainstream titles, TV-associated titles, and his own series.

== Career ==
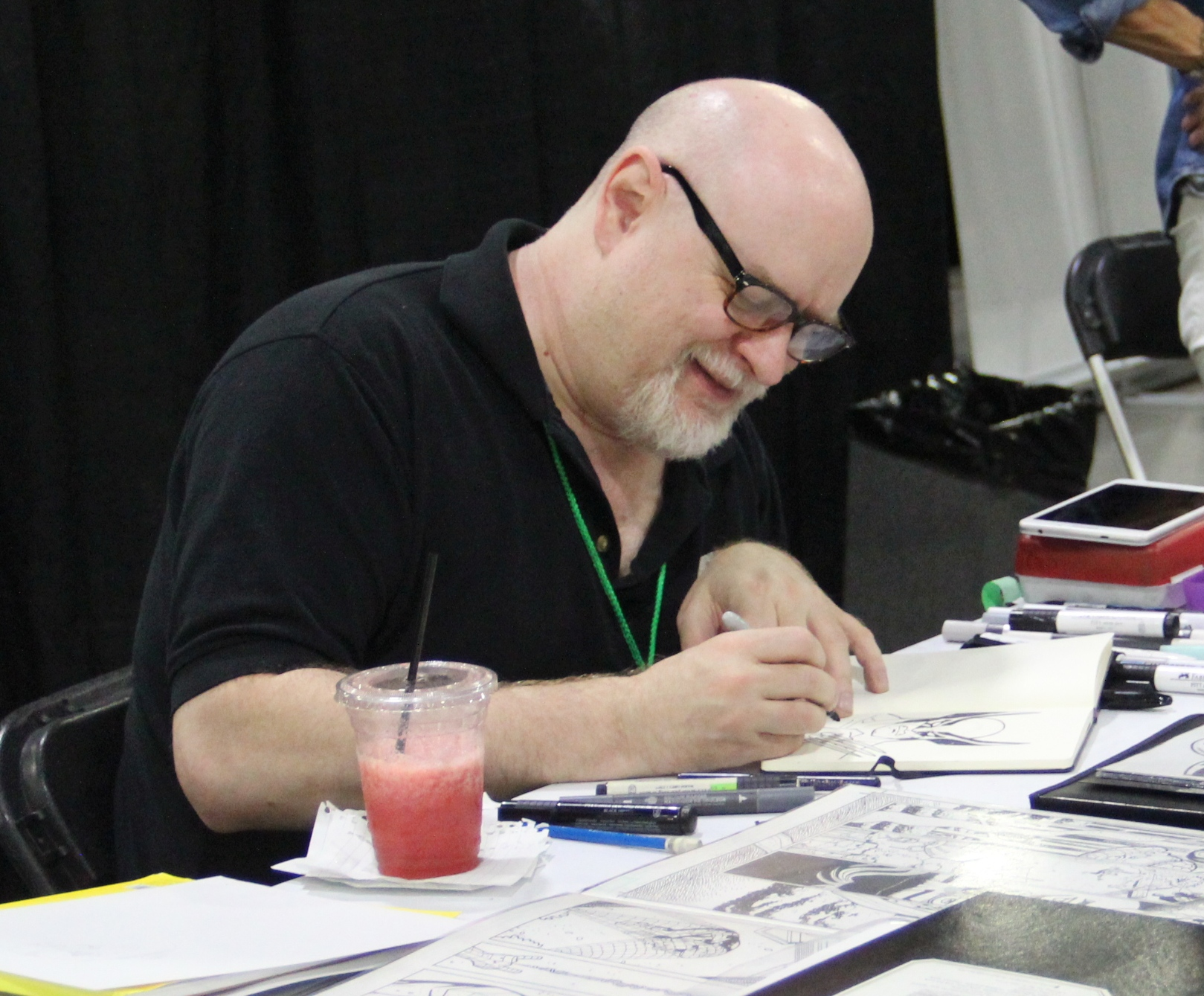
Templeton at the 2018 Atlanta Comic Con

Templeton first received attention for Stig's Inferno (Vortex Comics), now a cult favourite, which detailed the journey of its lead character into Hell in a parody of Dante's The Divine Comedy. Templeton recalled that after reading the three books of The Divine Comedy, "I fell in love with them as stories. It took a bit to get past the language translations, but for a year or so, I was reading different versions, off and on, as my reading on subways and buses, getting to and from school." Templeton first transferred this inspiration into comic book form with the intent of making it a strip in his campus newspaper, but ended up shelving the project until Vortex publisher William P. Marks suggested that he make it into a series. According to Marks, of the five series that Vortex was publishing at the time, Stig's Inferno was the most consistently produced on schedule.

He has gone on to do titles for Marvel Comics, DC Comics, Bongo Comics, and Moonstone Books, including Batman Adventures, The Simpsons and many others. He also created his own graphic novel, Bigg Time, published by DC Comics' mature readers imprint, Vertigo. He was recently editor of an independent Canadian comic company, Mr. Comics. Recent work includes writing and drawing stories for DC's Batman 66, based on the 1960s television series. He teaches classes in comic book writing and drawing, known as "Ty Templeton's Comic Book Boot Camp".

== Personal life ==
Templeton was born on May 9, 1962. He is the brother of internet pioneer and entrepreneur Brad Templeton, and son of Canadian celebrities Charles Templeton and Sylvia Murphy. He lives in Ontario, Canada.

On June 14, 2021, Templeton announced that he had been diagnosed with stage-three colorectal cancer; on October 13, 2022, he announced that he was cancer-free.

== Awards ==
- 1996: Eisner Award winner for Batman and Robin Adventures, by Paul Dini, Ty Templeton, and Rick Burchett (DC)
- 1998: Eisner Award winner for Batman and Robin Adventures, Ty Templeton, Brandon Kruse, Rick Burchett, and others (DC)
- 1998: Nominated for "Best Cover Artist" Eisner Award, for Batman and Robin Adventures
- 1999: Eisner Award winner for Batman: The Gotham Adventures, by Ty Templeton, Rick Burchett, and Terry Beatty (DC)
- 2005: Won "Outstanding Writer" Joe Shuster Award for The Batman Adventures
- 2014: Inducted into Canadian Comic Book Hall of Fame
- 2017: Won "Outstanding Webcomic Creator" Joe Shuster Award for Bun Toons.
