= Sylvia Murphy =

Canadian singer (1931–2021)

- Born: September 24, 1931; Montreal, Quebec, Canada
- Died: February 24, 2021 (aged 89); Mississauga, Ontario, Canada
- Occupation: Singer
- Years active: 1949–1964

Sylvia Murphy (September 24, 1931 – February 24, 2021) was a Canadian singer who was popular on radio and television programs on the CBC from 1949 to 1964.

== Biography ==
She was the oldest child of Celia (née Zoddickson) and John Murphy. Her mother was from a Belarusian Jewish family and her father was of Irish Catholic descent, but both were natives of Liverpool, England. They met in Montreal after both emigrated there separately.

Murphy got her start in nightclubs, and then was the featured singer on the radio programs Coca-Cola Refreshment Time and Club O'Connor with Billy O'Connor. She moved to television with a break on Cross-Canada Hit Parade and later became the singer for Jack Kane's Orchestra on the Jack Kane Show, Music Makers and Music '60. She was also a regular performer on the Wayne and Shuster Hour.

She was married first to Mark Simon, son of a Montreal cigar manufacturer, and then to broadcaster and author Charles Templeton. Her children with Templeton were comic-book artist Ty Templeton and internet entrepreneur Brad Templeton. Templeton also became stepfather to her children with Simon, TV host and director Deborah Burgess; and prominent tax attorney Michael Templeton, a partner at McMillan LLP. She later married William C. Tate, GM of Garrett Manufacturing Limited, a leading aerospace manufacturer. They had a son, Bruce Tate.

Murphy died on February 24, 2021, after contracting COVID-19 during the COVID-19 pandemic in Ontario. She was 89.
