= Samuel Thomas Wright =

Canadian politician

Ontario MPP
- In office 1926–1934
- Preceded by: Riding established
- Succeeded by: William Duckworth
- Constituency: Dovercourt

Personal details
- Born: December 19, 1887 Toronto, Ontario
- Died: January 28, 1948 (aged 60) Toronto, Ontario
- Party: Conservative
- Spouse: Edith L. Horner

Samuel Thomas Wright (December 19, 1887 – January 28, 1948) was a wholesale merchant and political figure in Ontario. He represented Dovercourt in the Legislative Assembly of Ontario from 1926 to 1934 as a Conservative member.

He was born in Toronto in 1887, the son of Samuel Wright and Dorothy Chapman, both Irish. Wright was educated in Toronto. In 1907, he married Edith L. Horner. He served as a member of the Canadian Expeditionary Force during World War I. Wright also served on Toronto city council and on the Toronto Harbour Commission. After serving on Toronto council, he served as reeve of the Toronto suburb of Long Branch from 1938 to 1941 and again in 1944. He died after an illness at Toronto in 1948.
