= Question Mark (TV program) =

- Genre: Current affairs
- Presented by: J. Frank Willis
- Country of origin: Canada
- Original language: English
- No. of seasons: 1

Production
- Producer: Del MacKenzie
- Running time: 30 minutes

Original release
- Network: CBC Television
- Release: 20 October 1963 – 26 July 1964

Question Mark is a Canadian current affairs television program that aired on CBC Television from 1963 to 1964.

== Premise ==
The program featured a series of conversations that explored beliefs and morals, sometimes of a religious nature. Charles Templeton featured segments on Moral Re-Armament and Malcolm Boyd, a film producer who became an Episcopal clergyman. Other topics included French Canadian culture, the potential for a Canadian motion picture industry, the National Hockey League, and suicide.

== Scheduling ==
This half-hour program was broadcast alternate Sundays at 10:30 p.m. (Eastern) from 20 October 1963 to 26 July 1964. Horizon aired on the other Sundays.

== Reception ==
NHL referee Red Story, an interview subject on Question Mark, later complained that his statements were omitted from the broadcast to such an extent as to provide a distorted impression of his employers.
