= Eamon Park =

Irish-born Canadian politician

George Eamon Park

Member of Provincial Parliament
- In office 1948–1951
- Preceded by: William Duckworth
- Succeeded by: David Kerr
- Constituency: Dovercourt

President of the New Democratic Party
- In office 1965–1967
- Preceded by: Merv Johnson
- Succeeded by: James Renwick

Personal details
- Born: 26 November 1916 Monkstown, County Cork, Ireland
- Died: 28 April 1975 (aged 58) London, England
- Party: Ontario CCF
- Spouse: Anne Clare
- Children: 2
- Education: De La Salle Academy
- Occupation: Labour organizer

George Eamon Park (26 November 1916 – 28 April 1975) was a Canadian politician and political organizer for the Co-operative Commonwealth Federation and the New Democratic Party. He was elected in the Toronto riding of Dovercourt in 1948.

== Background ==
Park was born in Monkstown, County Cork, Ireland in 1916. His father, Robert Park Sr., was in the Royal Navy and on manoeuvers at the time of his son's birth. Catherine Mary Park left Portsmouth, England to be with her family in Ireland to have the baby.

George was the eldest of four children; Catherine (called Kae), Thomas and Robert Jr. followed. In 1925 the family moved to Wales where Robert Park was working as a foreman at a mine. A long strike led the Parks to decide to move to Canada. They arrived in Toronto, Ontario in 1927.

George attended high school in Toronto and graduated from De La Salle Academy. Upon graduation he got involved with the labour movement, becoming a staff member at the United Steel Workers and an activist with the Cooperative Commonwealth Federation. It was during this time he dropped his first name and began to use the name Eamon instead.

During World War II, Park was living in Ottawa and met and married Anne Clare, a social worker originally from Winnipeg Manitoba. They had two children; Patricia Anne and Kevin Robert.

His wife Anne returned to Canada and remained an NDP activist until her death in January 1991. Both of their children followed in the Park family footsteps. Patty is a social worker, who also worked for the NDP government in Ontario in the 1990s. Her first husband, Dick Proctor, later became federal secretary of the NDP and a Member of Parliament for Saskatchewan. Her second husband, Murray Weppler, was executive assistant to federal NDP leader Ed Broadbent and Ontario leaders Michael Cassidy and Bob Rae.

Kevin Park became a union activist, working for the United Food and Commercial Workers and the Canadian Auto Workers union. He worked on staff at the British Columbia Government Employees Union in Vancouver. He died in Vancouver in 2007.

Kevin's twin children are carrying on the family tradition. Gareth Robert is a social worker in Ottawa, currently working with the Canadian Mental Health Association. He was a delegate to the 1989 NDP convention, making him the third generation of Parks to vote at an NDP gathering, and worked for Howard Hampton when he was an Ontario cabinet minister. Megan Kathleen is on staff at the Ontario Public Service Employees Union in Toronto and also worked for an NDP cabinet minister in the 1990s.

== Politics ==
In 1948 Park was elected as the Co-operative Commonwealth Federation (Ontario Section) (CCF) member of the Ontario legislature for the Toronto riding of Dovercourt. He ran in the 1951 election and was defeated. He ran in the federal election of 1968 as the NDP candidate for York East in Toronto but was defeated, coming in third with 27.47% of the vote.

== CCF/NDP organizer ==
Park continued his work with the union and the party, holding many roles within the provincial and national CCF infrastructure. Following the federal party's crushing defeat in the 1958 federal election, it was decided that the Canadian Labour Congress would align itself with the CCF to form a new political party. Park was a CLC representative on the Political Action Committee. The reborn group was first called The New Party, adopting a suggestion made by Park, later to become the New Democratic Party. At the NDP founding convention in 1961, Park was elected as secretary of the NDP executive. From 1965 to 1967 he served as president of the federal party.

In 1972, the Canadian government appointed Park as labour attaché to the High Commission of Canada in the United Kingdom. He also had responsibility for labour relations with Sweden. He died in London on 28 April 1975. His ashes were interred alongside his wife's in Mount Pleasant Cemetery, Toronto.
