= Tony Lupusella =

Canadian politician

Ontario MPP
- In office 1975–1990
- Preceded by: George Nixon
- Succeeded by: Tony Silipo
- Constituency: Dovercourt

Personal details
- Born: June 12, 1944 (age 81) Cardinale, Italy
- Party: New Democratic Party; Liberal Party
- Occupation: Community organizer

Antonio (Tony) Lupusella (born June 12, 1944) is a former politician in Ontario, Canada. He was a member of the Legislative Assembly of Ontario from 1975 to 1990. Originally a New Democrat, he later crossed the floor to the Liberal Party.

== Background ==
Before entering politics, Lupusella worked with Centro an Italian organization that grew out of the Union of Injured Workers.

== Politics ==
He was elected to the Ontario legislature in the 1975 provincial election, defeating Progressive Conservative incumbent George Nixon by 1,465 votes in the west-Toronto riding of Dovercourt. The NDP won several Italian ridings in Toronto during this election. He was re-elected over Nixon by a greater margin in the 1977 election. In the 1981 provincial election, he was re-elected over Liberal Gil Gillespie by only 294 votes, as the Liberal Party increased its presence in the city.

Lupusella defeated Gillespie a second time, by only 77 votes in the 1985 provincial election. Following this election, the Liberals and NDP formed a two-year parliamentary alliance, and defeated the Progressive Conservative government in the legislature (the PCs had previously governed Ontario since 1943).

Redistribution of electoral boundaries forced Lupusella to run against fellow NDP Member of Provincial Parliament (MPP) Ross McClellan for the party's nomination in Dovercourt after McClellan's Bellwoods riding was eliminated. McClellan defeated Lupusella and, on December 17, 1986, Lupusella crossed the floor to join the Liberal caucus of Premier David Peterson as a backbencher.

In the 1987 provincial election, Lupusella defeated McClellan by 907 votes. He served as a Parliamentary Assistant to the Minister of Transportation and the Minister of Government Services from 1987 to 1990.

The Liberals were defeated by the NDP in the 1990 provincial election, and Lupusella lost his seat to NDP candidate Tony Silipo.
