= ClariNet =

Online newspaper service

ClariNet Communications Corp
- Company type: Private
- Industry: Online publishing, Internet services
- Founded: 1989
- Founder: Brad Templeton
- Fate: Acquired by Individual, Inc. in 1997
- Headquarters: Waterloo, Ontario, Canada
- Area served: Internet (global)
- Key people: Brad Templeton (founder, CEO)
- Products: Online news, eBooks, subscription services

ClariNet Communications Corp was an online newspaper service delivered over the internet. It was founded in 1989 in Waterloo, Ontario, by Brad Templeton.

ClariNet delivered traditional newspaper and magazine content using Usenet newsgroup technology, existing as a proprietary newsgroup hierarchy independent to the Big 8 hierarchies. News was delivered over the internet using NNTP as well as UUCP.

== Founding ==
In the late 1980s, the Internet in the United States consisted of a variety of regional hubs connected by the NSFNet. Overtly commercial traffic was not permitted due to the Acceptable Use Policy. Templeton reports convincing Stephen Wolff, director of NSFNet, that a news service sold to universities and research labs on the internet for use in research and education would not violate the AUP, even though it was a for-profit effort.

It has some claim to being the earliest company created to use the internet as a business platform, commonly known as a dot-com company.

The initial announcement of a for-profit internet-based business was announced in June 1989 and generated significant controversy with some expressing fear of a destruction of the non-profit culture of the network. The first subscribing customer was Stanford University.

== Business ==
ClariNet began publishing the news of UPI and Newsbytes and other typical newspaper wire sources. It also included material form newspaper syndicates, such as the Dave Barry column and the first internet based comic strips, including Dilbert

The 'Street Price Report' published a database of advertised prices for computer products in magazines, predating the creation of Comparison shopping websites.

In 1994 ClariNet switched from UPI to the Associated Press and Reuters. Other services added included the Commerce Business Daily, PR Newswire and Business Wire

ClariNet was the highest ranked dot-com company in the 1996 Inc. Magazine 500.

ClariNet sold site-wide subscriptions. At the time of its acquisition by Individual, Inc. in 1997 it reported 1.5 million paying subscribers.

== Free speech ==
ClariNet was a plaintiff/appellant in the United States Supreme Court case Reno v. American Civil Liberties Union. ClariNet's CEO testified that the Communications Decency Act created a chilling effect for online publishers. The appellants prevailed 9-0 and the decency sections were struck down.

== Science fiction eBooks ==
In 1992 ClariNet announced a subscription "all you can read" book service for Science Fiction readers called the "Library of Tomorrow." In 1993, it published, in coordination with the Science Fiction Hugo Awards an E-book anthology containing all the nominees for the 1993 Hugo Award, presented at the 51st World Science Fiction Convention in San Francisco. The anthology also contained all Nebula Award short fiction nominees for that year. With 5 full novels (most still only available in hardcover) ClariNet claimed this was the largest anthology or e-Book of current fiction published under one cover. It also featured a hypertext version of A Fire Upon the Deep, the to-be-Hugo-winning novel by Vernor Vinge. The anthology was available for download over the internet, and on CD-ROM. In particular, it was made available to voters in the Hugo awards to allow them to read the works in time to vote on them for the award. The publication of such a "Hugo Packet" became a common practice in later years.

== Alumni ==
- Brad Templeton
- Don Woods (programmer)
- David H. Brandin

== See also ==
- History of the Internet
- dot-com company
- USENET
- UUNET
