= The Silhouette (newspaper) =

Student newspaper at McMaster University

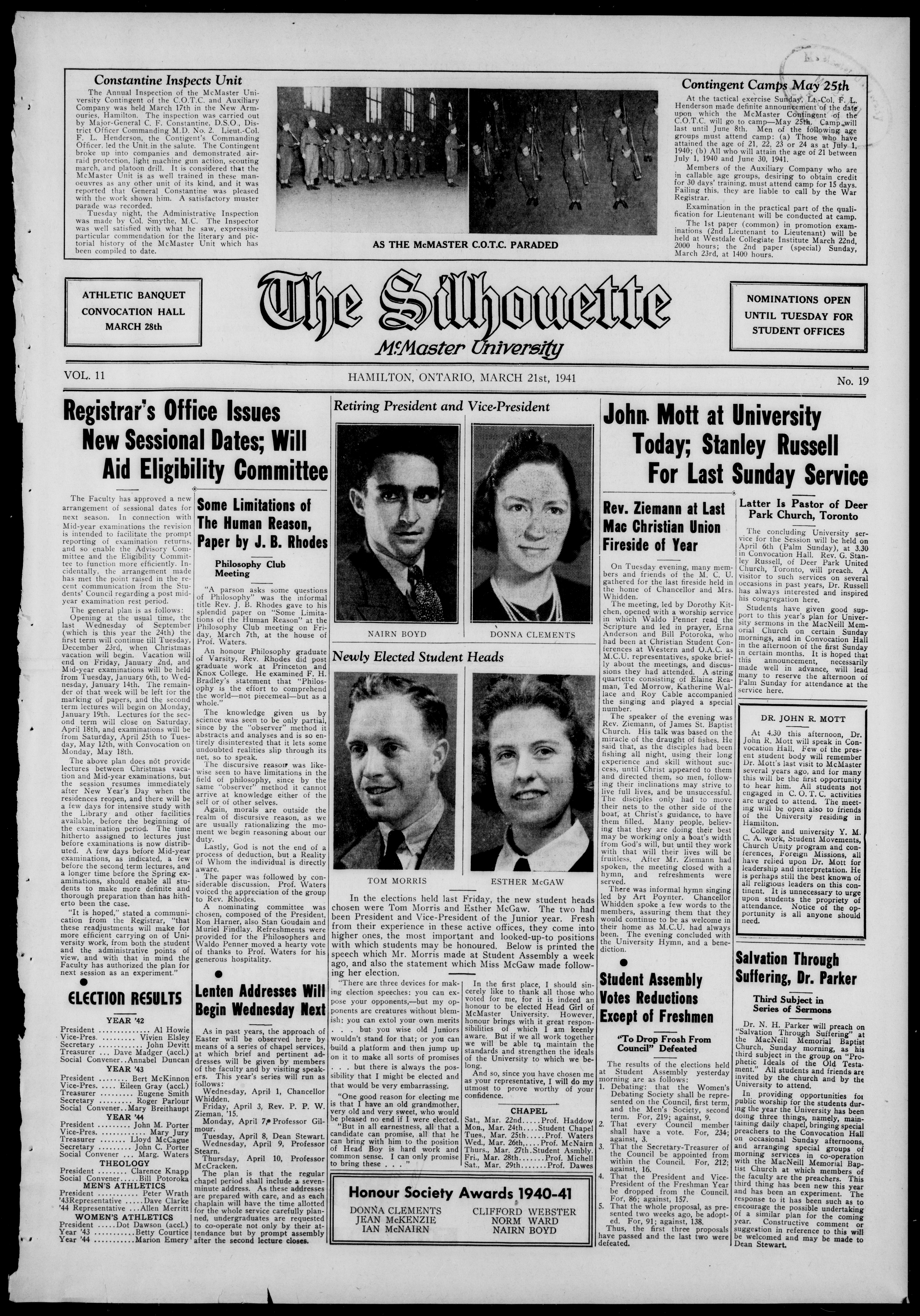
- The Silhouette print edition March 21, 1941.
- Type: Student newspaper
- Owner: McMaster Students Union
- Editor-in-chief: Andrew Mrozowski (2021–2022)
- Managing editor: Adrian Salopek (2021–2022)
- Founded: 1930
- Headquarters: McMaster University Campus
- Circulation: 3,000 Print
- Website: thesil.ca

The Silhouette (founded circa 1930) is a student newspaper at McMaster University, located in Hamilton, Ontario, Canada. The masthead staff consists of the Editor-in-Chief, a recently graduated student from McMaster, and approximately 15 paid full-time students. The newspaper is published every Thursday during the academic year, and once during each summer month. The circulation is 3,000 copies per week. The paper contains six major sections; news, opinions, sports, features, arts and culture, and Humans of McMaster.

The paper switched from broadsheet quarter fold to tabloid in August, 2014. In September, 2021, the paper switched from tabloid to 8.5x11" in order to focus on rebranding the Sil in an accessible format. Among the student population at McMaster, the paper is known as the Sil.

The newspaper has placed a grater emphasis on digital publishing.

== Notable alumni ==
- Peter Calamai (June 23, 1943 – January 22, 2019), a science journalist who served as editor-in-chief of The Silhouette during his time at McMaster.
- Gary Lautens (November 3, 1928 – February 1, 1992), a Canadian humorist and newspaper columnist who wrote for the Toronto Star.
- Eugene Levy (born December 17, 1946), a Canadian actor, comedian and writer.
- Dave Thomas (born May 20, 1949), a Canadian comedian and actor.
- Keiko Margaret Lyons (born Nov 21, 1923), a former Vice President of CBC.

== Topics ==
The Silhouette primarily features news related to McMaster University, with topics such as athletics, clubs, the student council, and school-sponsored events.

== See also ==
- List of student newspapers in Canada
- List of newspapers in Canada
