= William Stewart (Ontario politician) =

Canadian trade unionist and communist politician

William E. Stewart (born 19 October 1919 and died 30 January 2008) was a trade unionist and leader of the Communist Party of Ontario in the 1970s. Stewart was born and raised in Hamilton, Ontario and was a union organizer in the textile and electrical industries. During World War II he served with the Canadian Armoured Corps.

He lived in British Columbia in the 1950s and 1960s where he worked as a dockworker and was a Communist candidate in Vancouver South in the 1962 federal election and again in 1965.

Stewart led the party's coterie of five candidates in the 1971 provincial election. In 1975, the party ran 33 candidates and received 9,500 votes.

Stewart ran in Dovercourt in the 1971, 1975 and 1977 provincial elections. He was also the Communist Party of Canada's candidate in St. Catharines for the 1974 federal election.

He was succeeded as party leader by Mel Doig for the 1981 provincial election. Stewart served as the party's labour secretary in the 1980s.

He died on 30 January 2008 in the hospital of Kelowna.
