= Brad Templeton =

Canadian businessman

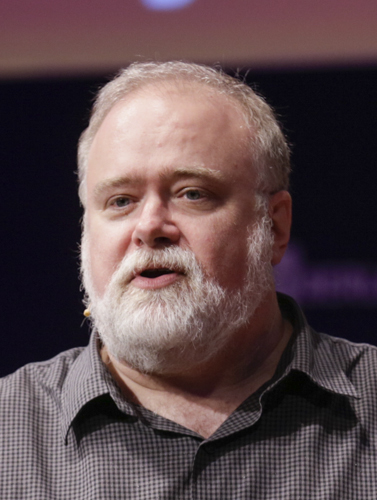
- Brad Templeton in 2014
- Born: June 1960 (age 66) near Toronto, Ontario, Canada
- Occupations: Software architect, entrepreneur
- Parent(s): Charles Templeton, Sylvia Murphy

Brad Templeton (born June 1960 near Toronto) is a Canadian software developer, internet entrepreneur, online community pioneer, publisher of news, comedy, science fiction and e-books, writer, photographer, civil rights advocate, futurist, public speaker, educator and self-driving car consultant. He graduated from the University of Waterloo.

== Notable projects ==
=== ClariNet ===
Most notably, Templeton was founder and CEO in 1989 of ClariNet Communications, the first company founded to engage in commercial activity over the early Internet.

=== Electronic Frontier Foundation ===
Templeton has been involved with the Electronic Frontier Foundation since 1997, including being chairman from 2000 to 2010. His involvement in online civil rights also includes being the subject of one of the first major internet bans and being a plaintiff before the Supreme Court of the United States in Reno v. ACLU Templeton's strongest efforts have been in the areas of free speech, computer security, privacy and intellectual property.

=== rec.humor.funny and USENET ===
Templeton played an active role over the life of Usenet, including the development of software tools for it. His most notable activities involved the creation and moderation of the newsgroup "rec.humor.funny", a moderated newsgroup devoted to comedy. USENET statistics reported by Brian Reid reported rec.humor.funny as the most widely read online publication starting in 1989, continuing in that position into the mid-1990s, with an estimated 440,000 readers.

=== e-Books ===
Templeton was editor and publisher for ClariNet's Hugo and Nebula Anthology 1993, one of the largest early commercial e-Book projects. It offered 5 full novels still in hardback release, along with a wide array of short fiction and multimedia. In later years, it has become the norm for the administrators of the Hugo Award to produce an annual digital anthology of award nominees.

This was an adjunct of the "Library of Tomorrow" project, which offered a full library of fiction on an "all you can read" subscription basis.

=== Foresight Institute ===
Since 2004, Templeton has been a board member of the Foresight Institute.

=== Singularity University ===
Templeton joined the founding faculty for Singularity University, an educational institution and think-tank devoted to rapidly changing technology and its effects. Since 2010 he has been Chair for Networks and Computing on that faculty.

=== Robocars ===
Templeton has been an active writer in the field of Robocars since 2007, building the site Robocars.com and writing regularly at Brad Ideas. In 2010, he joined the Google self-driving car project (now known as Waymo) where he consulted on strategy and technology. He has also served as a consulting advisor for Starship Technologies in the delivery robot space and Quanergy LIDAR, among others. He writes frequently on this topic on his own web site, the Forbes site and others. Templeton is inventor on 21 patents in self-driving cars and telephony.

== Speaker ==
Templeton has been a keynote speaker at many conferences and events, including Wired UK, Pioneers Festival Vienna, University of British Columbia Master Mind Class, Web Summit, Next Berlin, The Next Web Amsterdam, Ontario Centres of Excellence Toronto, USI Paris, Australian Unix Users Group (AUUG) Sydney, Korean Global Leaders Forum, CLSA Forum Hong Kong and Tokyo, Baidu Big Talk, Beijing, Singularity Summit Chile (also Buenos Aires, Christchurch, Budapest, Seville, Johannesburg, Milan, Amsterdam, Berlin and Copenhagen) and Innotown Norway.

== Software and bibliography ==
- Author, Time Trek game for Commodore PET (VisiCorp 1978)
- Consultant, VisiCalc port to Commodore PET (VisiCorp 1979)
- Port, Checker King game for Apple and Atari (VisiCorp 1979)
- Port, Microchess game for Atari (VisiCorp 1980)
- Lead Author, Visiplot graphing tool for IBM PC (VisiCorp 1981)
- Author, PAL Assembler for Commodore computers (Temtech, 1980)
- Author, POWER programming tools for Commodore (Professional Software, Pro-Line) 1981
- Lead Author, ALICE: The Personal Pascal Structure editor and integrated development environment for IBM PC, Atari ST and QNX (Looking Glass Software / Software Channels, 1985)
- Lead Author, ALICE Basic structure editor and IDE for QNX (Looking Glass Software 1986)
- Lead Author, 3-2-1 Blastoff spreadsheet compiler for Lotus 1-2-3 (Frontline Systems/Intel, 1987)
- Author, 3-2-1 Gosub programming tool for Lotus 1-2-2 (Frontline Systems, 1988)
- Compressor Author, Stuffit Deluxe (Aladdin Systems, 1989)
- Author, Newsclip programming language for Usenet filtering, 1988
- Author, TVWish wishlist system for MythTV (open source)
- Editor, The Internet Jokebook (Peer-to-peer Publishing, 1995)
- Editor, The Telejokebook/rec.humor.funny annual Vol I-IV (ClariNet 1988–1992)
- Editor, Electric Science Fiction online award nominees (ClariNet, 1992)
- Editor, Hugo and Nebula Anthology 1993 (ClariNet, 1995)

== Other roles ==
Templeton was a director of Bittorrent Inc. Bittorrent's software was the largest driver of internet bandwidth use during the early 21st century. He is also the author of several well known internet essays on copyright and netiquette. He was also an active artist at Burning Man creating installations based on photography and telephony.

== Family ==
Templeton is the son of Charles Templeton and Sylvia Murphy, and the brother of Ty Templeton.

== See also ==
- List of University of Waterloo people
