= Youth for Christ =

Religious organization based in Denver, Colorado, US

Youth For Christ
- Abbreviation: YFC
- Formation: 1944; 82 years ago
- Location: Worldwide
- First President: Torrey Johnson
- First Employee: Billy Graham
- Current International Director: Dave Brereton
- 10th U.S. President/CEO: Jacob Bland
- Revenue: $151M USD Worldwide Aggregate; of which $100M USD is U.S. Organization
- Volunteers: Over 30,000 worldwide
- Students: Over 1M worldwide
- Website: http://www.yfci.org

Youth For Christ (YFC) is a worldwide Christian movement working with young people, whose main purpose is evangelism among teenagers. It began informally in New York City in 1940, when Jack Wyrtzen held evangelical Protestant rallies for teenagers. Rallies were held in other U.S. cities during World War II, attracting particularly large crowds in Chicago led by Torrey Johnson, who became YFC's first president in 1944. Johnson hired Billy Graham as YFC's first employee. Former YFC staff have launched over 100 related Christian organizations, including the Billy Graham Evangelistic Association and World Vision.

In 1962, the original Youth For Christ International organization was renamed Youth For Christ USA; as the group launched a new, international federation of YFC ministries based in Switzerland. Today, YFC International issues a charter to over 100 nationally led YFC organizations, each autonomous in their strategy and operations but united under a common mission to reach young people everywhere. The U.S. organization reaches young people in over 1,300 locations nationwide. The international delegation meets every three years for a General Assembly.

== History ==
=== Early years, 1940s–1950s ===
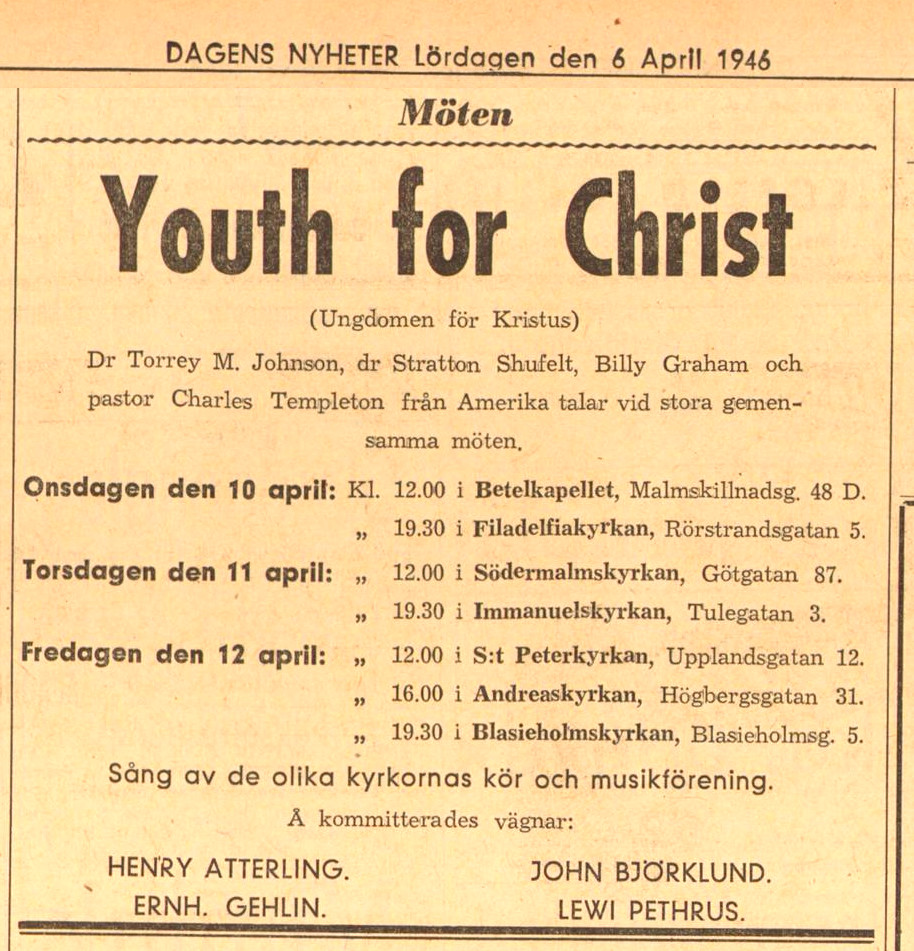
Advertisement for Youth for Christ's 3-day campaign in Stockholm in April 1946.

Youth for Christ rallies were first held in New York City in 1940, organized by Jack Wyrtzen, a young ex-insurance salesman who had also played the trombone in a cavalry band. The Youth for Christ campaign idea spread to Washington, D.C., Detroit, Indianapolis and St. Louis. In 1944 Torrey Johnson, a Baptist minister and pastor of Chicago's Midwest Bible Church, staged "Chicagoland for Christ" and became the most successful advocate of this type of campaign. Johnson was elected Youth for Christ's first president, with Billy Graham as its first full-time evangelist.

Following the end of World War II, the movement expanded to other countries after Charles Templeton of Toronto, Ontario, Canada, and Torrey Johnson met with a number of youth leaders from around the United States at Winona Lake, Indiana, in 1945 to form a working group that would become an international organization. The name "Youth for Christ International" was adopted in 1946. By then, Youth for Christ International had approximately 300 units in the United States and over 200 overseas. The average attendance at rallies in 1946 was 350. The largest attendance at that time was 70,000 at Soldier's Field in Chicago. Popular youth events such as Bible quizzing, which is now embraced by many Christian denominations, were originally begun as Youth for Christ activities.

Evangelist Billy Graham was the first full-time evangelist of YFCI. Graham took over Johnson's local radio program called Songs in the Night which was broadcast over a local station in Illinois and predated YFCI. The movement also benefited by promotional publicity in the newspapers and magazines owned or influenced by William Randolph Hearst. Large rallies were held at the Hollywood Bowl in Los Angeles, California, organized by Wilbur Nelson in 1949–1950.

=== The 1960s–1980s ===
In 1968, in a little publicized conference in Jamaica, representatives from different countries created the International Council of Youth for Christ with Dr. Sam Wolgemuth as the first International President. The number of nations with Youth for Christ ministry had grown to over 100. Youth for Christ continued its growth throughout the 1970s and 1980s. Different ministry models and ministry emphases were developed and refined to reach young people around the world. During this time the current Youth for Christ logo was launched and adopted by the global organization.

=== The 1990s–2000s ===
In 1996 a report was presented to the Youth for Christ movement in Taiwan, with recommendations for a restructuring of the organisation. In March, 2000, the Youth for Christ organisation met in Muhltal, Germany. Most of the leadership, including the International Board, attended the gathering. The Youth for Christ worldwide Staff and Leadership Conference (General Assembly) was held in Denver, Colorado later that year.

== Leadership ==
Dave Brereton is the current International Director of Youth for Christ. Jacob Bland is the 10th President/CEO of Youth For Christ USA.
