= Torrey Johnson =

American evangelist and pastor (1909-2002)

- Born: Torrey Maynard Johnson. March 15, 1909; Chicago, Illinois, United States
- Died: May 15, 2002 (aged 93)
- Education: Moody Bible Institute and Northern Baptist Theological Seminary
- Occupations: Evangelist and Pastor
- Spouse: Evelyn Nilsen (m. 1930–2002)
- Children: Ruth, Torrey Jr, Arleen

Torrey Maynard Johnson (March 15, 1909 – May 15, 2002) was a Chicago Baptist who is best remembered as the founder of Youth for Christ in 1944. For a time Johnson had his own local radio program called Songs in the Night, which he later turned over to Billy Graham who was also hired as the first full-time evangelist employed by Youth for Christ International. At one time, he was pastor of Messiah Baptist Church, 2930 W. Flournoy Street, Chicago, Illinois, and at a later time in 1967, Senior Pastor at Bibletown Community Church, later Boca Raton Community Church, at 470 NW 4th Avenue, Boca Raton, Florida 33432.
