= Gary Lautens =

Canadian humorist and newspaper columnist

- Born: November 3, 1928; Fort William, Ontario, Canada
- Died: February 1, 1992 (aged 63); Toronto, Ontario, Canada
- Education: McMaster University
- Writing career
- Years active: 1948–1992
- Notable awards: National Newspaper Award, Stephen Leacock Medal for Humour

Gary Lautens (November 3, 1928 – February 1, 1992) was a Canadian humorist and newspaper columnist. He wrote for the Toronto Star from 1962 until his death in 1992.

== Biography ==
Lautens was born on November 3, 1928, in Fort William, Ontario, to Joe and Bertha Lautens. The family relocated to Hamilton where his father, a Canadian Press employee for 50 years, was a teletype operator and mechanic servicing CP machines in the area from an office in the Hamilton Spectator. Lautens began working for the Spectator after school and in the summers when he was just 13 years old. After graduating from Central Collegiate Institute in 1946, Lautens went on to study history at McMaster University where he was the editor of the campus newspaper The Silhouette from 1948 to 1950.

On graduation Lautens joined the Spectator as a reporter in 1950. He became a sports columnist in 1954 and later served as the paper's assistant sports editor. Fans of the Hamilton Tiger-Cats once burned Lautens in effigy after he had written something unflattering about the team in the newspaper. He met his wife, Jackie, in 1957 when she was a contestant and he was a judge in the annual "Miss Tigercat" pageant. Together they had three children: Richard, Stephen and Jane.

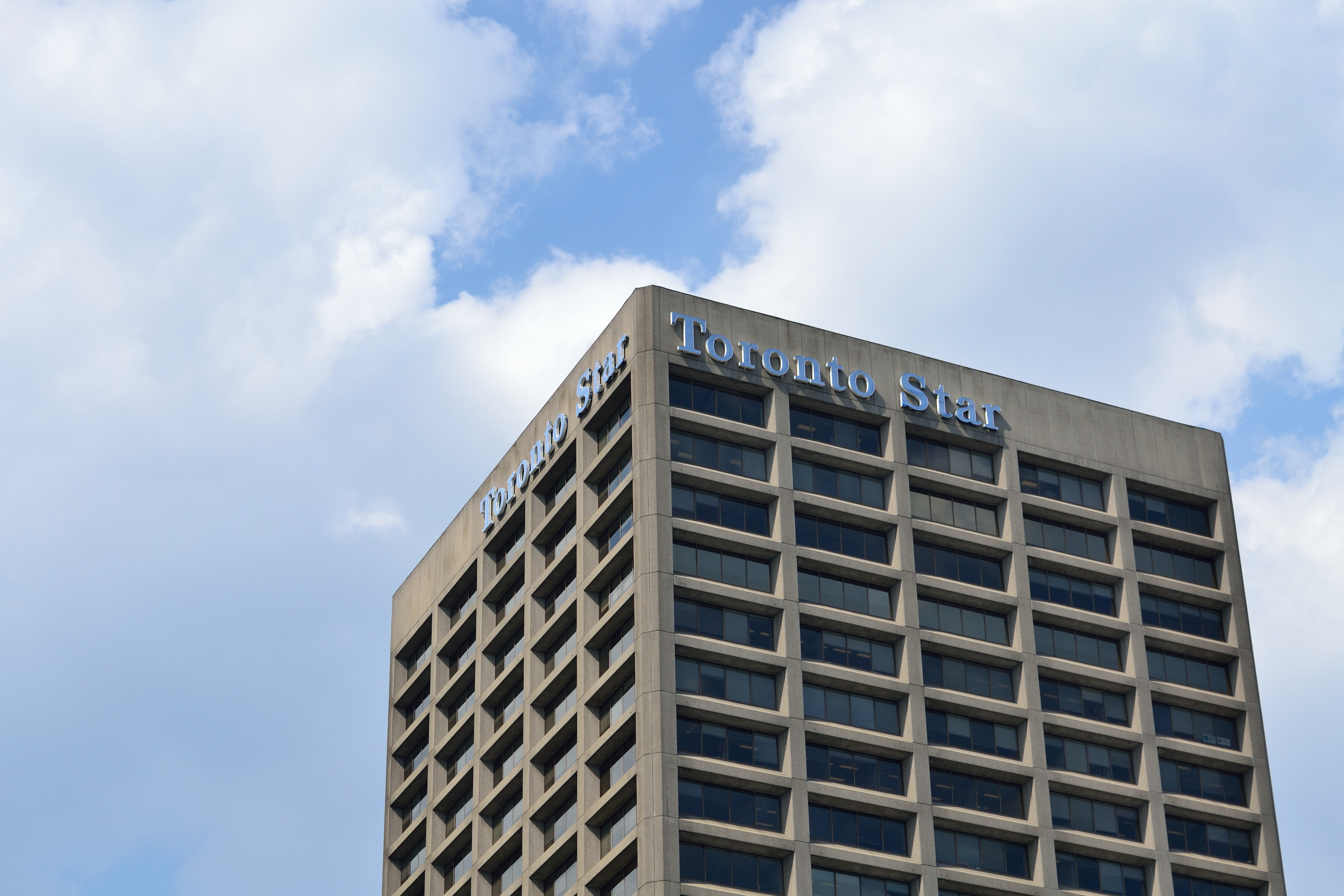
Toronto Star Building

In 1962, Lautens was hired by the Star to replace Pierre Berton. At the Star, Lautens became the most widely read columnist in Canada. In 1982, Lautens was named managing editor of the Star, and successfully increased the paper's circulation and profits even in the midst of an economic recession. He held the position for two years before returning to writing his humour column. On his time as managing editor, Lautens commented: "More important than the commercial success, however, has been the stand The Star has taken on issues I personally consider important - nuclear disarmament, drunk driving, acid rain, medicare, unemployment, the rape of our natural resources."

Lautens published four books during his lifetime. He was awarded a National Newspaper Award (1963) and was a two-time winner of the Stephen Leacock Medal for Humour (1981 and 1984). Two further books collecting some of his most popular columns – Peace, Mrs. Packard and the Meaning of Life (1993) and The Best of Gary Lautens (1995) – were published posthumously. In addition to his newspaper writing, Lautens hosted occasional television and radio programming on CBC Television. He was staff writer for many seasons of the iconic CBC series Front Page Challenge and appeared, for two seasons, as a panelist on It's Your Choice.

His younger brother Trevor Lautens was a long-time columnist for the Vancouver Sun, his youngest son Richard Lautens is an acclaimed photojournalist for the Toronto Star and oldest son Stephen Lautens is also a noted Canadian newspaper columnist.

=== Death ===
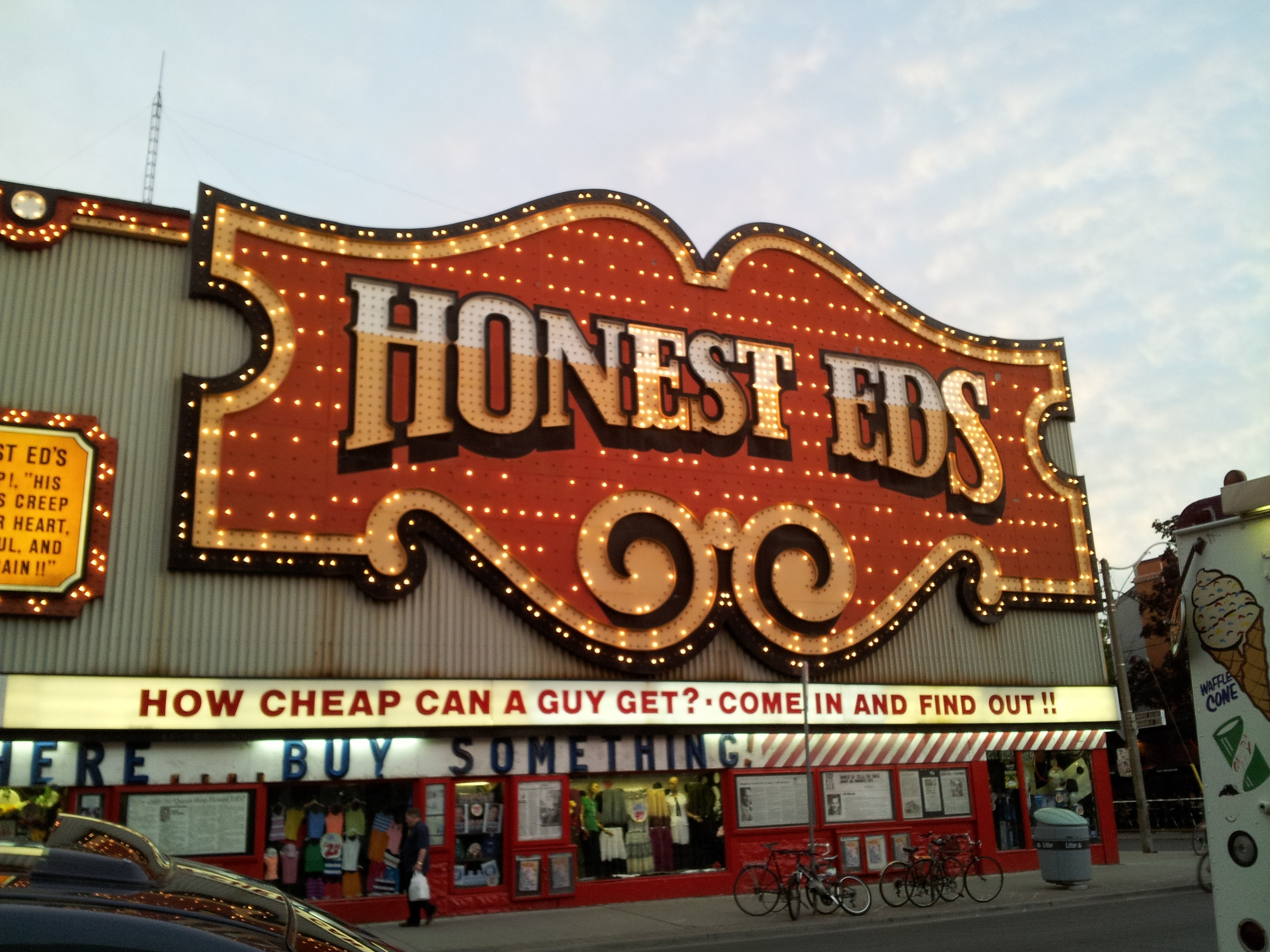
Exterior view of Honest Ed's with Lautens' column visible (bottom left).

Lautens died on February 1, 1992, after suffering a massive heart attack at his home in downtown Toronto. Upon news of Lautens' death, thousands of readers turned up at the Star offices, lining up for three days to sign books of condolence. Lincoln Alexander remarked: "He was a great guy ... So full of light, so full of humour. My close friend. His smile and humour will be sorely missed."

Following Lautens's death the Gary Lautens Memorial Scholarship was established at McMaster to assist students with high academic standing and demonstrating written journalistic skill. In 2002 Lautens family donated his papers, including correspondence, columns, scrapbooks and photographs, to McMaster University Library's William Ready Division of Archives and Research Collections. In 2016 it was announced that the archives would become home to the copy of Lautens' 1984 column "Why can't the Queen shop Honest Ed's?" that had been on display outside Toronto's iconic Honest Ed's for 31 years.

== Books ==
- Laughing with Lautens (1964)
- Take My Family...Please! (1980)
- No Sex Please...We're Married (1983)
- How Pierre and I Saved the Civilized World (1984)
- Peace, Mrs. Packard and the Meaning of Life (1993)
- The Best of Gary Lautens (1995)
