= Grey North =

Grey North may refer to:

- Grey North (federal electoral district)
- Grey North (provincial electoral district)
