= Andy Thompson (Canadian politician) =

Canadian politician

The Honourable Andy Thompson

Canadian Senator from Ontario
- In office 1967–1998
- Nominated by: Lester B. Pearson
- Appointed by: Georges Vanier

Ontario MPP
- In office 1959–1967
- Preceded by: David Kerr
- Succeeded by: Dante De Monte
- Constituency: Dovercourt

Ontario Liberal Party Leader
- In office 1964–1966
- Preceded by: John Wintermeyer
- Succeeded by: Robert Nixon

Leader of the Official Opposition
- In office 1964–1966
- Preceded by: Farquhar Oliver
- Succeeded by: Robert Nixon

Personal details
- Born: Andrew Ernest Joseph Thompson; 14 December 1924 Belfast, Northern Ireland
- Died: 3 February 2016 (aged 91)
- Party: Liberal
- Spouse: Amy Riisna (m. 1959)
- Children: 1
- Occupation: Social worker

Military service
- Allegiance: Canadian
- Branch/service: Royal Canadian Naval Volunteer Reserve
- Years of service: 1943-1946
- Rank: Lieutenant

Andrew Ernest Joseph Thompson (14 December 1924 – 3 February 2016) was a Canadian politician. Thompson was leader of the Ontario Liberal Party and later served as a Senator. He was elected as the Member of Provincial Parliament (MPP) for the west-end Toronto Dovercourt electoral district in 1959. He was elected the Ontario Liberal Party's leader in 1964. His physical health began to fail in late 1966 forcing him to retire as the Liberal leader. He was appointed to the Canadian Senate in 1967, forcing him to resign his provincial seat in the Legislative Assembly of Ontario. He attracted media attention in 1997 and 1998 for making few appearances in the Senate over the past decade. His health issues never really went away, and gave that as his explanation for his truancy. He became the first Senator ever stripped of his office staff, salary and expense account for truancy, in 1998. A month later he resigned in order to receive his pension.

== Early life and career ==
Andrew was born in Belfast, Northern Ireland, in 1924, the fourth child of Joseph Stanley Thompson and his wife Edith Florence Magill. Andrew and his two older brothers, Robert and Hudson, were educated at Monkton Combe School in England from 1936 to 1939, with Andrew first attending Monkton Combe Junior School from 1936 to 1938. After emigrating to Canada, he attended Oakwood Collegiate in Toronto. He was a student at the University of Toronto from 1942 to 1943 until he joined the Royal Canadian Navy during World War II as a Sub-Lieutenant, serving aboard minesweepers. He was discharged after the war in 1946 with the rank of Lieutenant. He completed his education at Queen's University and received a Bachelor of Arts degree in 1947. He received a Master of Social Work from the University of British Columbia in 1949. He worked in the federal civil service, becoming Regional Liaison Officer for the Prairie Provinces, Canadian Federal Department of Citizenship & Immigration and serving as a special assistant to federal Liberal leader Lester B. Pearson. In 1959, he married Amy Riisna whom he met at a Liberal conference in Couchiching. They lived in downtown Toronto on St. George Street and raised one daughter.

== Provincial politics ==
Thompson was first elected as a Member of Provincial Parliament in the 1959 Ontario election as a candidate of the Ontario Liberal Party in the Toronto riding of Dovercourt. Thompson was close friends with federal Liberal cabinet minister Walter Gordon having organized his federal candidacy in the federal equivalent of Thompson's Dovercourt constituency.

He made his name in the Ontario legislature in March 1964 when he assailed Attorney-General Fred Cass over Bill 99, which would have amended the Police Act to allow the Ontario Police Commission to interrogate individuals in secret leading to it being derisively referred to as the "Police State Bill". The scandal forced Cass to resign and enhanced Thompson's reputation considerably. He was elected leader of the party in the fall of 1964 when he defeated Charles Templeton on the sixth ballot.

Thompson suffered a physical breakdown in late 1966 as a result of his involvement in an automobile accident in which two elderly women were seriously injured. He also had existing health problems, specifically a heart murmur, combined with exhaustion, high blood pressure and a lengthy bout of influenza. On the advice of doctors, Thompson resigned as leader in November 1966 without ever having led his party in an election. He was succeeded as Liberal leader by Robert Nixon.

== Senate career ==
Thompson was named to the Senate of Canada on 6 April 1967. His time in the Senate was relatively uneventful. He kept a low profile but in 1997 was exposed as having the worst attendance of any currently sitting Senator. Thompson claimed he was unable to attend Senate sessions due to illness, but continued to draw his salary by showing up for a few days at the beginning of each session. At the time Senate rules stated that as long as a Senator did not miss two complete consecutive sittings and proper medical certificates were provided for absences, they would be in good standing.

With growing media attention on Thompson's absences from the red chamber, the Reform Party made Thompson's absence a cause celebre, repeatedly pointing to the fact that he was living in Mexico. Reform Members of Parliament hired a Mariachi band and served burritos in the lobby of the Senate to draw attention to the issue. Thompson was held up as an example of why the Senate needed to be reformed.

The resulting furore led to Thompson being expelled from the Liberal caucus on 19 November 1997. On 12 December 1997, Senator Colin Kenny moved that he be commanded to appear before the Senate to explain his absence. On 16 December they voted in favour of the Kenny motion. A subcommittee reported on 19 February recommending that Thompson be found in contempt and that he be suspended for the remainder of the session. The Senate voted to strip him of his privileges and other benefits. Later they found Thompson in contempt of the upper chamber for not complying with orders to return to Ottawa to explain his attendance record, resulting in the suspension of his salary and tax-free expense allowance. In December 1997, Thompson lost his Senate office and other privileges. Some Senators disagreed with the suspension, arguing that it was too lenient and that he should have been expelled from the chamber instead. He resigned on 23 March 1998, 20 months ahead of his scheduled retirement but was still able to collect a pension.

The media's exposure of Thompson's attendance and his colleagues' tolerance of it led the Senate to toughen the rules governing its members and sick leave while also increasing the financial penalties for missing too many sittings during a session. Thompson died on 3 February 2016, at the age of 91 after years of declining health.
