= Victor Copps =

Canadian politician

Mayor of Hamilton, Ontario
- In office 1962–1976
- Preceded by: Lloyd Douglas Jackson
- Succeeded by: Vince Agro

Personal details
- Born: Victor Kennedy Copps; March 21, 1919 Haileybury, Ontario, Canada
- Died: October 15, 1988 (aged 69) Hamilton, Ontario, Canada
- Resting place: Holy Sepulchre Cemetery
- Spouse: Geraldine Florence (Guthro) Copps
- Children: Sheila Copps

Victor Kennedy Copps (March 21, 1919 – October 15, 1988) was a Canadian politician who served as Mayor of Hamilton.

== Life and career ==
Copps was born in Haileybury, Ontario. He enlisted in the Royal Canadian Air Force during World War II, following which, he worked in Timmins, Ontario for a local newspaper. In 1945 he moved to Hamilton to become a sports broadcaster on CHML. He entered local politics in 1960, winning a seat on the Board of Control and becoming deputy Mayor. He ran for Mayor in 1962 defeating the incumbent.

He sparked outrage among Hamilton's Protestant community, as one of his first official acts was to abolish the annual Orange Order Parade, a staple of Hamilton for many years. In 1964 he was an unsuccessful candidate at the Ontario Liberal Party's leadership convention.

Copps continued as mayor until 1976 when he was forced to retire following a heart attack while running in the Around the Bay Road Race. He was the city's first Roman Catholic mayor and its second-longest serving holder of that office. Under his leadership, the city engaged in a major project of urban renewal. The city's sports and entertainment arena, TD Coliseum, was previously named Copps Coliseum in his honour.

Copps was the father of Sheila Copps, a former Canadian cabinet minister.
