= A Second Look (1969 TV series) =

- Genre: Sketch comedy
- Written by: Bill Hartley; Tony Hudz; David Kendall; Eric Nicol
- Directed by: Al Vitols
- Presented by: Terry David Mulligan; Bill Reiter
- Starring: Allan Anderson; Graeme Campbell; Len Doncheff; Roxanne Erwin; Diane Grant; Mickie Maunsell; Graham Teear
- Country of origin: Canada
- Original language: English
- No. of seasons: 1
- No. of episodes: 6

Production
- Executive producer: Neil Sutherland
- Producer: Al Vitols
- Running time: 30 minutes

Original release
- Network: CBC Television
- Release: 5 January – 16 March 1969

A Second Look is a Canadian television series that aired on CBC Television in 1969.

== Premise ==
Terry David Mulligan and Bill Reiter hosted this satirical series which was based on BBC's The Frost Report. Commentary was combined with sketches as performed by comedians Allan Anderson, Graeme Campbell, Len Doncheff, Roxanne Erwin, Diane Grant, Mickie Maunsell and Graham Teear. Each episode concerned a particular theme, such as "Man and the Machine" on the debut.

== Production ==
A Second Look was produced in Vancouver. It is distinct from CBC's earlier 1964 series A Second Look.

== Scheduling ==
The half-hour series aired on Sundays at 2:00 p.m. (Eastern) from 5 January to 16 March 1969.
