= Dovercourt (provincial electoral district) =

Former provincial electoral district in Ontario, Canada

Ontario electoral district
- Dovercourt in context with the other Toronto ridings in 1926

Defunct provincial electoral district
- Legislature: Legislative Assembly of Ontario
- District created: 1925
- District abolished: 1996
- First contested: 1926
- Last contested: 1995

Dovercourt was the name of a provincial riding in Ontario, Canada. It existed from the 1926 election to the 1999 election. When it was established, it bordered Brockton on to the west, York South to the north, and Bracondale on the east. Lake Ontario was its southern border for most of its existence. At its abolition in 1999, it consisted of that part of the city of Toronto bounded on the north by the former city limits, on the east by Bathurst Street, on the south by Bloor Street and on the west by the CN Railway and St. Clair Avenue. It was redistributed into Davenport, St. Paul's and Trinity—Spadina ridings.

== Members of Provincial Parliament ==
Dovercourt
Assembly	Years	Member	Party
Prior to 1926 part of Toronto Southwest and Toronto Northwest ridings
17th	1926–1929	Samuel Wright	Conservative
18th	1929–1934	Samuel Wright	Conservative
19th	1934–1937	William Duckworth (Note: In 1938, the title of Member of the Legislative Assembly was officially changed to Member of Provincial Parliament. Previously, it was unofficially used in the media and in the Legislature.) (Note: The Conservative party changed their name to Progressive Conservative before the 1943 election.)	Conservative
20th	1937–1943	William Duckworth	Conservative
21st	1943–1945	William Duckworth	Progressive Conservative
22nd	1945–1948	William Duckworth	Progressive Conservative
23rd	1948–1951	George Eamon Park	Co-operative Commonwealth
24th	1951–1955	David Kerr	Progressive Conservative
25th	1955–1959	David Kerr	Progressive Conservative
26th	1959–1963	Andy Thompson	Liberal
27th	1963–1967	Andy Thompson	Liberal
28th	1967–1971	Dante De Monte	Liberal
29th	1971–1975	George Adam Nixon	Progressive Conservative
30th	1975–1977	Tony Lupusella (Note: On December 17, 1986 crossed the floor to sit as a Liberal.)	New Democratic
31st	1977–1981	Tony Lupusella	New Democratic
32nd	1981–1985	Tony Lupusella	New Democratic
33rd	1985–1987	Tony Lupusella	New Democratic
34th	1987–1990	Tony Lupusella	Liberal
35th	1990–1995	Tony Silipo	New Democratic
36th	1995–1999	Tony Silipo	New Democratic
Sourced from the Ontario Legislative Assembly
Merged into Davenport, St. Paul's and Trinity—Spadina ridings after 1999

== Election results ==
=== 1987 electoral boundaries ===
1995 Ontario general election
Party	Candidate	Votes	%	±%
New Democratic	Tony Silipo	9,049	47.23	–7.02
Liberal	Maria Dasilva-Skultety	5,561	29.02	–4.82
Progressive Conservative	Malcolm Mansfield	3,560	18.58	+12.24
Green	Shelly Lipsey	390	2.04	–0.92
Independent	Amani Oakley	261	1.36	–
Natural Law	Erica Kindl	179	0.93	–
Libertarian	Douglas Quinn	161	0.84	–1.78
Total valid votes		19,161	97.88	
Total rejected, unmarked and declined ballots		415	2.12	+0.42
Turnout		19,576	63.22	–3.04
Eligible voters		30,963		
New Democratic hold		Swing		–1.10
Source: Elections Ontario

1990 Ontario general election
Party	Candidate	Votes	%	±%
New Democratic	Tony Silipo	10,604	54.25	+9.27
Liberal	Tony Lupusella	6,615	33.84	–15.33
Progressive Conservative	Allan Brown	1,239	6.34	+2.06
Green	Norman Allan	577	2.95	–
Libertarian	Fred Lamberti	513	2.62	+1.04
Total valid votes		19,548	98.30	
Total rejected, unmarked and declined ballots		338	1.70	+0.72
Turnout		19,886	66.27	–1.52
Eligible voters		30,009		
New Democratic gain from Liberal		Swing		+12.30
Source: Elections Ontario

1987 Ontario general election
Party	Candidate	Votes	%	±%
Liberal	Tony Lupusella	10,634	49.17	+10.66
New Democratic	Ross McClellan	9,727	44.97	+6.01
Progressive Conservative	Norm Panzica Jr.	926	4.28	–16.51
Libertarian	D'Arcy J. Cain	342	1.58	–
Total valid votes		21,629	99.02	
Total rejected ballots		214	0.98	–0.01
Turnout		21,843	67.78	+0.29
Eligible voters		32,224		
Liberal gain from New Democratic		Swing		+2.32
Source: Elections Ontario

=== 1974 electoral boundaries ===
1985 Ontario general election
Party	Candidate	Votes	%	±%
New Democratic	Tony Lupusella	6,677	38.96	+1.15
Liberal	Gil Gillespie	6,600	38.51	+2.73
Progressive Conservative	Joe Palozzi	3,564	20.79	–2.73
Communist	Gordon Massie	298	1.74	+0.62
Total valid votes		17,139	99.01	
Total rejected ballots		172	0.99	–0.13
Turnout		17,311	67.50	+5.03
Eligible voters		25,647		
New Democratic hold		Swing		–0.79
Source: Elections Ontario

1981 Ontario general election
Party	Candidate	Votes	%	±%
New Democratic	Tony Lupusella	5,491	37.81	–10.49
Liberal	Gil Gillespie	5,197	35.78	+14.98
Progressive Conservative	John Burigana	3,416	23.52	–4.00
Independent	Vince Corriero	258	1.78	–
Communist	Mel Doig	162	1.12	–1.38
Total valid votes		14,524	98.88	
Total rejected ballots		165	1.12	+0.16
Turnout		14,689	62.46	–1.96
Eligible voters		23,516		
New Democratic hold		Swing		–12.73
Source: Elections Ontario

1977 Ontario general election
Party	Candidate	Votes	%	±%
New Democratic	Tony Lupusella	7,340	48.30	+6.19
Progressive Conservative	George Adam Nixon	4,183	27.52	–4.44
Liberal	A. David MacDonald	3,162	20.81	–1.16
Communist	William Stewart	380	2.50	–0.80
Libertarian	Maureen C. Cain	133	0.88	–
Total valid votes		15,198	99.04	
Total rejected ballots		148	0.96	–0.08
Turnout		15,346	64.42	+0.78
Eligible voters		23,822		
New Democratic hold		Swing		+5.32
Source: Elections Ontario

1975 Ontario general election
Party	Candidate	Votes	%	±%
New Democratic	Tony Lupusella	6,083	42.10	+7.72
Progressive Conservative	George Adam Nixon	4,618	31.96	–2.63
Liberal	Agustino Venier	3,174	21.97	–6.66
Communist	William Stewart	477	3.30	+0.90
Independent	Hugh Yearwood	96	0.66	–
Total valid votes		14,448	98.95	
Total rejected ballots		153	1.05	–1.04
Turnout		14,601	63.64	–3.01
Eligible voters		22,943		
New Democratic gain from Progressive Conservative		Swing		+5.18
Source: Elections Ontario

=== 1966 electoral boundaries ===
1971 Ontario general election
Party	Candidate	Votes	%	±%
Progressive Conservative	George Adam Nixon	6,183	34.60	+3.99
New Democratic	Steve Penner	6,144	34.38	+5.59
Liberal	Dante De Monte	5,116	28.63	–9.31
Communist	William Stewart	429	2.40	–0.27
Total valid votes		17,872	97.91	
Total rejected ballots		381	2.09	+0.35
Turnout		18,253	66.65	+9.27
Eligible voters		27,387		
Progressive Conservative gain from Liberal		Swing		–0.80
Source: Elections Ontario

1967 Ontario general election
Party	Candidate	Votes	%	±%
Liberal	Dante De Monte	6,053	37.93	–7.79
Progressive Conservative	Kay Armstrong	4,884	30.61	–1.14
New Democratic	Otto Bressan	4,594	28.79	+6.26
Communist	Bruce Magnuson	426	2.67	–
Total valid votes		15,957	98.26	
Total rejected ballots		282	1.74	+0.13
Turnout		16,239	57.38	–1.16
Eligible voters		28,303		
Liberal hold		Swing		–3.32
Source: Elections Ontario

1963 Ontario general election
Party	Candidate	Votes	%	±%
Liberal	Andy Thompson	6,938	45.72	+10.99
Progressive Conservative	Lawrence Odette	4,818	31.75	–1.57
New Democratic	Jack White	3,418	22.53	–6.34
Total valid votes		15,174	98.40	
Total rejected ballots		247	1.60	–0.15
Turnout		15,421	58.53	+4.07
Eligible voters		26,345		
Liberal hold		Swing		+6.28
Source: Elections Ontario

1959 Ontario general election
Party	Candidate	Votes	%	±%
Liberal	Andy Thompson	5,336	34.74	+8.00
Progressive Conservative	David Kerr	5,118	33.32	–2.80
Co-operative Commonwealth	Gordon Brennan	4,434	28.87	–5.06
Labor–Progressive	Jessie Jackson	473	3.08	–0.14
Total valid votes		15,361	98.25	
Total rejected ballots		274	1.75	+0.09
Turnout		15,635	54.46	–1.45
Eligible voters		28,707		
Liberal gain from Progressive Conservative		Swing		+5.40
Source: Elections Ontario

1955 Ontario general election
Party	Candidate	Votes	%	±%
Progressive Conservative	David Kerr	6,288	36.12	–2.86
Co-operative Commonwealth	Eamon Park	5,905	33.92	–2.96
Liberal	Harold V. Locke	4,655	26.74	+2.61
Labor–Progressive	George H. Jackson	560	3.22	–
Total valid votes		17,408	98.34	
Total rejected ballots		294	1.66	–0.14
Turnout		17,702	55.92	–4.04
Eligible voters		31,657		
Progressive Conservative hold		Swing		+0.05
Source: Elections Ontario

1951 Ontario general election
Party	Candidate	Votes	%	±%
Progressive Conservative	David Kerr	8,595	38.98	+2.76
Co-operative Commonwealth	Eamon Park	8,133	36.89	–11.27
Liberal	Pat V. Roach	5,321	24.13	+8.51
Total valid votes		22,049	98.20	
Total rejected ballots		404	1.80	+0.81
Turnout		22,453	59.95	–4.33
Eligible voters		37,450		
Progressive Conservative gain from Co-operative Commonwealth		Swing		+7.02
Source: Elections Ontario

1948 Ontario general election
Party	Candidate	Votes	%	±%
Co-operative Commonwealth	Eamon Park	12,262	48.16	+20.04
Progressive Conservative	William Duckworth	9,223	36.22	–9.45
Liberal	Gertrude Dunn	3,978	15.62	–5.98
Total valid votes		25,463	99.01	
Total rejected ballots		254	0.99	–0.15
Turnout		25,717	64.28	–4.18
Eligible voters		40,006		
Co-operative Commonwealth gain from Progressive Conservative		Swing		+14.75
Source: Elections Ontario

1945 Ontario general election
Party	Candidate	Votes	%	±%
Progressive Conservative	William Duckworth	12,236	45.67	+2.20
Co-operative Commonwealth	William R. Lucas	7,532	28.11	–3.38
Liberal	Harold V. Locke	5,788	21.60	+5.94
Labor–Progressive	Elizabeth Morton	1,237	4.62	–
Total valid votes		26,793	98.86	
Total rejected ballots		309	1.14	+0.34
Turnout		27,102	68.47	+19.31
Eligible voters		39,585		
Progressive Conservative hold		Swing		+2.79
Source: Elections Ontario

1943 Ontario general election
Party	Candidate	Votes	%	±%
Progressive Conservative	William Duckworth	7,265	43.47	–4.00
Co-operative Commonwealth	Frederick W. Dowling	5,263	31.49	+19.31
Liberal	Cyril T. Young	2,618	15.67	–22.66
Independent	George P. Granell	1,566	9.37	–
Total valid votes		16,712	99.20	
Total rejected ballots		134	0.80	–0.52
Turnout		16,846	49.16	–14.09
Eligible voters		34,270		
Progressive Conservative hold		Swing		–11.65
Source: Elections Ontario

1937 Ontario general election
Party	Candidate	Votes	%	±%
Conservative	William Duckworth	10,396	47.47	+6.34
Liberal	Robert R. Leslie	8,393	38.32	–0.98
Co-operative Commonwealth	John Kelly	2,668	12.18	–6.42
Labour	John Berry	284	1.30	–
Liberal–Progressive	Robert Harding	159	0.73	–
Total valid votes		21,900	98.68	
Total rejected ballots		293	1.32	–0.51
Turnout		22,193	63.24	–3.69
Eligible voters		35,091		
Conservative hold		Swing		+3.66
Source: Elections Ontario

=== 1934 electoral boundaries ===
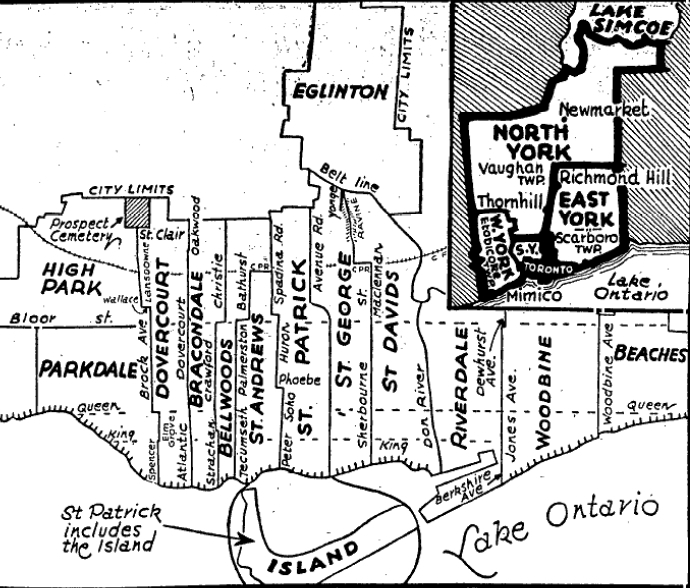
Toronto riding boundaries after 1934 redistribution

1934 Ontario general election
Party	Candidate	Votes	%	±%
Conservative	William Duckworth	9,266	41.13	–25.81
Liberal	James Malcolm Dalrymple	8,856	39.31	+6.24
Co-operative Commonwealth	Thomas Cruden	4,192	18.61	–
Communist	James Reid	216	0.96	–
Total valid votes		22,530	98.17	
Total rejected ballots		421	1.83	+1.43
Turnout		22,951	66.94	+22.96
Eligible voters		34,287		
Conservative hold		Swing		–16.03
Source: Elections Ontario

=== 1926 electoral boundaries ===
1929 Ontario general election
Party	Candidate	Votes	%	±%
Conservative	Samuel Thomas Wright	4,316	66.94	+0.01
Liberal	Robert D. Stanley	2,132	33.06	–0.01
Total valid votes		6,448	99.60	
Total rejected ballots		26	0.40	+0.04
Turnout		6,474	43.98	–18.09
Eligible voters		14,721		
Conservative hold		Swing		+0.01
Source: Elections Ontario

1926 Ontario general election
Party	Candidate	Votes	%
Conservative	Samuel Thomas Wright	6,239	66.93
Liberal	Angus Gillies	3,083	33.07
Total valid votes		9,322	99.64
Total rejected ballots		34	0.36
Turnout		9,356	62.07
Eligible voters		15,074	
Conservative pickup new district.			
Source: Elections Ontario

== See also ==
- List of Ontario provincial electoral districts
- Canadian provincial electoral districts
