= Let's Face It (TV program) =

- Genre: Current affairs
- Written by: Ken Johnstone; Sonja Sinclair; Gerald Taafe
- Country of origin: Canada
- Original language: English
- No. of seasons: 1

Production
- Producer: Byron Riggan
- Editor: Edgar Sarton
- Running time: 30 minutes

Original release
- Network: CBC Television
- Release: 20 October – 29 December 1963

Let's Face It is a Canadian current affairs television program that aired on CBC Television in 1963.

== Premise ==
Let's Face It was originally produced as a regional show on CBMT Montreal, concerning topics within Quebec. In 1963, the Montreal-produced program was expanded for a network-wide audience and examined national and international events of note. Correspondents of the network-wide version of Let's Face It were located in most of CBC's major production locations throughout Canada.

The program was inspired by BBC's That Was the Week That Was and incorporated elements of satire and music. As such, it was a forerunner of CBC's This Hour Has Seven Days.

Peter Desbarats and Pauline Julien were among the contributors who appeared during the series, which presented both English and French personalities. Interview subjects included Simone de Beauvoir, John Grigg, Arthur Koestler, Anthony Sampson and Jean-Paul Sartre.

== Scheduling ==
This half-hour program was broadcast on alternate Sundays at 10:00 p.m. from 20 October to 29 December 1963. Horizon appeared on the other Sundays.

== Reception ==
Let's Face It was deemed an "embarrassment" and was cancelled after several weeks. Ottawa Citizen television critic Jean Strachan deemed it among CBC's "poorest quality, most immature productions" of that season.
