= 1971 Ontario general election =

Canadian provincial election

- October 21, 1971

117 seats in the 29th Legislative Assembly of Ontario 59 seats were needed for a majority
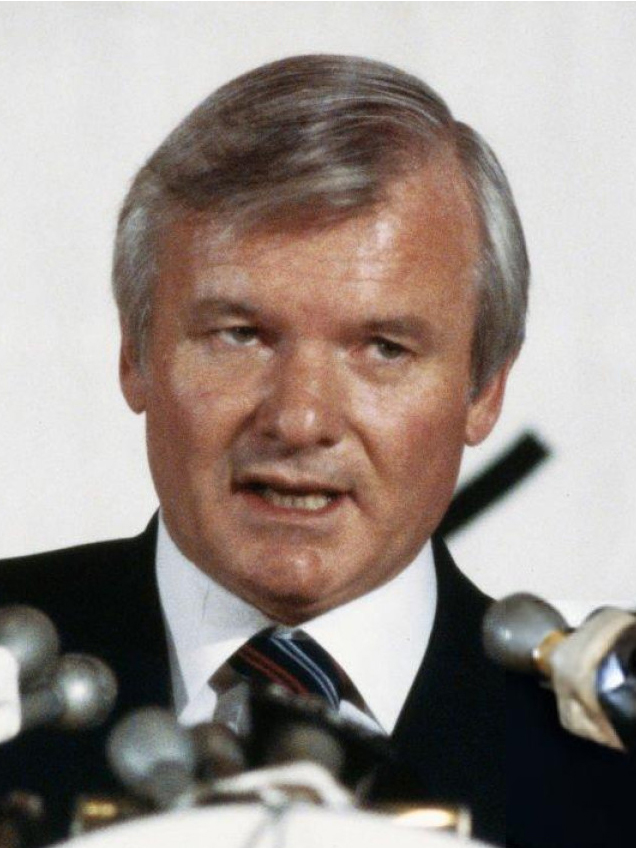

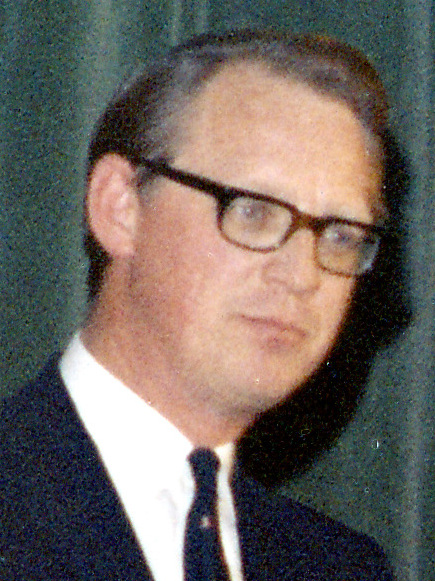

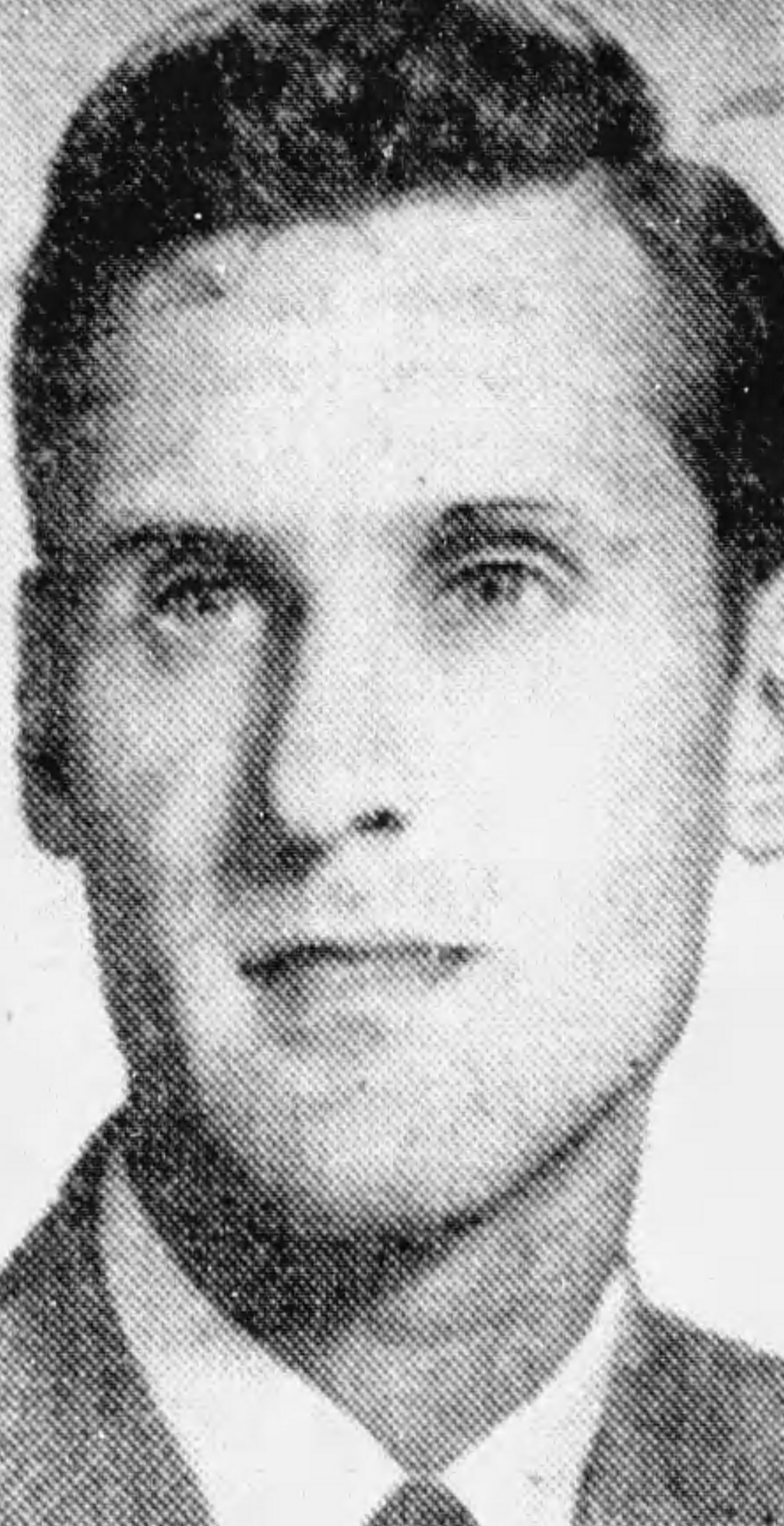
	First party	Second party	Third party
Leader	Bill Davis	Robert Nixon	Stephen Lewis
Party	Progressive Conservative	Liberal	New Democratic
Leader since	February 12, 1971	January 6, 1967	October 4, 1970
Leader's seat	Peel North	Brant	Scarborough West
Last election	69	28	20
Seats won	78	20	19
Seat change	▲9	▼8	▼1
Popular vote	1,465,313	913,742	893,879
Percentage	44.5%	27.8%	27.1%
Swing	▲2.2pp	▼3.8pp	▲1.2pp
Premier before election
Bill Davis
Progressive Conservative
Premier after election
Bill Davis
Progressive Conservative

The 1971 Ontario general election was held on October 21, 1971, to elect the 117 members of the 29th Legislative Assembly of Ontario (Members of Provincial Parliament, or "MPPs") of the Province of Ontario.

The Ontario Progressive Conservative Party, led by Bill Davis, who had replaced John Robarts as PC leader and premier earlier in the year, won a ninth consecutive term in office, and maintained its majority in the legislature, increasing its caucus in the legislature by eight seats from its result in the previous election.

The Ontario Liberal Party, led by Robert Nixon, lost seven seats, but continued in the role of official opposition.

The social democratic Ontario New Democratic Party, led by Stephen Lewis, lost one seat.

This election marked the first time that the provincial election was held on a Thursday. Subsequently, every provincial election has also been held on a Thursday, with the exception of the 2007 Ontario general election, which was held on a Wednesday.

The electoral franchise was significantly expanded upon the reduction of the voting age from 21 to 18.

== Results ==
=== Summary ===
Elections to the 29th Parliament of Ontario (1967)
Political party	Party leader	MPPs				Votes			
Political party	Party leader	Candidates	1967	1971	±	#	±	%	± (pp)
Progressive Conservative	Bill Davis	117	69	78	9▲	1,465,313	446,558▲	44.50%	2.40▲
Liberal (Note: includes Liberal-Labour in 1967 totals)	Robert Nixon	117	28	20	8▼	913,742	146,351▲	27.75%	3.97▼
New Democratic	Stephen Lewis	117	20	19	1▼	893,879	265,482▲	27.15%	1.18▲
Independent		23	–	–	–	16,959	14,577▲	0.52%	0.42▲
Communist	William Stewart	5	–	–	–	1,620	558▲	0.05%	0.03▲
Social Credit		5	–	–	–	1,204	702▼	0.04%	0.04▼
Total		384	117	117		3,292,717		100.00%	
Rejected ballots						18,059	1,469▼		
Voter turnout						3,310,776	871,538▲	73.52	7.34▲
Registered electors						4,503,142	817,387▲		

=== Vote and seat summaries ===
Ternary plots - shift of electoral support (1967-1971)
1967

1971
Electoral districts identified by colours of winning parties

Seats and popular vote by party
Party	Seats	Votes	Change (pp)
█ Progressive Conservative	78 / 117	44.50%	2.40
█ Liberal	20 / 117	27.75%	-3.97
█ New Democratic	19 / 117	27.15%	1.18
█ Independent	0 / 122	0.52%	0.42
█ Other	0 / 122	0.08%	-0.03

=== Synopsis of results ===
Results by riding - 1971 Ontario general election
Riding	Winning party						Turnout (Note: including spoilt ballots)	Votes						
Name (Note: order is as given in EO reports)	1967	Party	Votes	Share	Margin #	Margin %	Turnout	PC	Lib	NDP	Ind	Comm	SC	Total
Algoma	PC	PC	5,222	42.20%	1,397	11.29%	73.88%	5,222	3,326	3,825	–	–	–	12,373
Algoma—Manitoulin	Lib	PC	5,147	40.32%	1,298	10.17%	72.06%	5,147	3,768	3,849	–	–	–	12,764
Brant	Lib	Lib	8,846	50.98%	3,699	21.32%	73.31%	5,147	8,846	3,359	–	–	–	17,352
Brantford	NDP	PC	16,632	45.04%	4,524	12.25%	80.80%	16,632	8,188	12,108	–	–	–	36,928
Carleton	PC	PC	18,538	49.95%	7,622	20.54%	73.78%	18,538	10,916	7,656	–	–	–	37,110
Carleton East	PC	PC	13,190	46.56%	4,123	14.56%	65.97%	13,190	9,067	6,069	–	–	–	28,326
Chatham—Kent	PC	PC	10,827	48.54%	2,208	9.90%	65.09%	10,827	8,619	2,859	–	–	–	22,305
Cochrane North	PC	PC	11,212	64.02%	5,454	31.14%	76.21%	11,212	543	5,758	–	–	–	17,513
Cochrane South	NDP	NDP	11,383	48.43%	655	2.79%	74.68%	10,728	1,270	11,383	122	–	–	23,503
Dufferin—Simcoe	PC	PC	12,063	51.97%	4,454	19.19%	68.28%	12,063	7,609	3,540	–	–	–	23,212
Durham	PC	PC	10,628	48.22%	3,454	15.67%	76.47%	10,628	4,239	7,174	–	–	–	22,041
Elgin	PC	PC	14,742	45.08%	4,325	13.23%	78.98%	14,742	10,417	7,329	215	–	–	32,703
Essex—Kent	Lib	Lib	7,087	40.30%	1,035	5.89%	75.52%	4,446	7,087	6,052	–	–	–	17,585
Essex South	Lib	Lib	12,217	51.75%	5,696	24.13%	74.77%	4,872	12,217	6,521	–	–	–	23,610
Fort William	PC	PC	13,428	49.05%	3,777	13.80%	75.91%	13,428	4,296	9,651	–	–	–	27,375
Frontenac—Addington	PC	PC	7,539	38.05%	1,706	8.61%	71.67%	7,539	5,833	2,081	4,363	–	–	19,816
Glengarry	PC	PC	7,496	55.72%	3,211	23.87%	75.27%	7,496	4,285	1,672	–	–	–	13,453
Grenville—Dundas	PC	PC	11,635	63.06%	6,988	37.87%	70.55%	11,635	4,647	1,927	242	–	–	18,451
Grey—Bruce	Lib	Lib	13,657	46.17%	2,638	8.92%	79.70%	11,019	13,657	4,905	–	–	–	29,581
Grey South	PC	PC	10,285	54.91%	4,870	26.00%	77.15%	10,285	5,415	3,029	–	–	–	18,729
Haldimand—Norfolk	PC	PC	16,197	57.67%	8,981	31.98%	74.48%	16,197	7,216	4,673	–	–	–	28,086
Halton East	PC	PC	21,359	55.43%	11,622	30.16%	75.07%	21,359	9,737	7,154	284	–	–	38,534
Halton West	PC	PC	25,136	59.53%	16,353	38.73%	76.20%	25,136	8,783	8,306	–	–	–	42,225
Hamilton Centre	NDP	NDP	8,018	38.32%	1,422	6.80%	61.61%	6,596	6,310	8,018	–	–	–	20,924
Hamilton East	NDP	NDP	11,073	40.64%	2,846	10.45%	71.11%	8,227	7,947	11,073	–	–	–	27,247
Hamilton Mountain	PC	PC	17,979	50.28%	7,254	20.29%	78.13%	17,979	7,053	10,725	–	–	–	35,757
Hamilton West	PC	PC	12,807	43.51%	4,565	15.51%	73.86%	12,807	8,150	8,242	–	233	–	29,432
Hastings	PC	PC	9,195	59.79%	4,636	30.14%	70.12%	9,195	4,559	1,626	–	–	–	15,380
Huron	PC	PC	9,793	57.81%	6,155	36.34%	78.11%	9,793	3,638	3,414	94	–	–	16,939
Huron—Bruce	Lib	Lib	12,374	67.60%	8,616	47.07%	79.13%	3,758	12,374	2,172	–	–	–	18,304
Kenora	PC	PC	11,226	61.44%	6,331	34.65%	73.05%	11,226	2,150	4,895	–	–	–	18,271
Kent	Lib	Lib	8,768	49.83%	1,992	11.32%	80.37%	6,776	8,768	2,051	–	–	–	17,595
Kingston and the Islands	PC	PC	12,285	43.92%	187	0.67%	68.30%	12,285	12,098	3,587	–	–	–	27,970
Kitchener	Lib	Lib	19,168	42.30%	5,633	12.43%	72.62%	13,535	19,168	12,237	379	–	–	45,319
Lambton	PC	PC	9,983	50.70%	3,697	18.78%	75.69%	9,983	6,286	2,915	507	–	–	19,691
Lanark	PC	PC	10,670	58.97%	5,695	31.47%	69.20%	10,670	4,975	2,450	–	–	–	18,095
Leeds	PC	PC	15,477	65.45%	10,754	45.48%	75.26%	15,477	3,447	4,723	–	–	–	23,647
Lincoln	PC	PC	19,513	62.54%	13,289	42.59%	72.38%	19,513	6,224	4,556	572	336	–	31,201
London North	PC	PC	17,266	41.90%	5,426	13.17%	73.09%	17,266	11,198	11,840	902	–	–	41,206
London South	PC	PC	24,064	50.54%	11,363	23.87%	77.88%	24,064	12,701	10,845	–	–	–	47,610
Middlesex North	PC	PC	8,633	52.49%	4,155	25.26%	78.65%	8,633	3,337	4,478	–	–	–	16,448
Middlesex South	PC	PC	12,253	42.85%	3,053	10.68%	77.14%	12,253	7,140	9,200	–	–	–	28,593
Muskoka	PC	PC	7,240	50.01%	3,119	21.54%	73.68%	7,240	3,116	4,121	–	–	–	14,477
Niagara Falls	Lib	PC	12,221	42.25%	1,833	6.34%	73.46%	12,221	10,388	6,319	–	–	–	28,928
Nickel Belt	PC	NDP	9,003	49.37%	1,964	10.77%	79.34%	7,039	2,195	9,003	–	–	–	18,237
Nipissing	Lib	Lib	12,166	41.95%	28	0.10%	74.61%	12,138	12,166	4,698	–	–	–	29,002
Northumberland	PC	PC	12,277	54.43%	5,560	24.65%	75.74%	12,277	6,717	3,563	–	–	–	22,557
Ontario	PC	PC	10,970	52.26%	5,306	25.28%	76.40%	10,970	5,664	4,356	–	–	–	20,990
Ontario South	PC	PC	16,561	51.14%	5,614	17.34%	78.42%	16,561	4,876	10,947	–	–	–	32,384
Oshawa	NDP	PC	19,207	46.73%	2,726	6.63%	74.99%	19,207	5,413	16,481	–	–	–	41,101
Ottawa Centre	Lib	NDP	8,075	35.46%	182	0.80%	62.36%	7,893	6,804	8,075	–	–	–	22,772
Ottawa East	PC	Lib	10,827	52.52%	5,127	24.87%	57.10%	5,700	10,827	3,590	499	–	–	20,616
Ottawa South	PC	PC	22,392	51.67%	11,754	27.12%	72.89%	22,392	10,307	10,638	–	–	–	43,337
Ottawa West	PC	PC	18,349	45.54%	6,712	16.66%	74.85%	18,349	10,308	11,637	–	–	–	40,294
Oxford	Lib	PC	16,322	46.01%	3,024	8.52%	77.52%	16,322	13,298	5,856	–	–	–	35,476
Parry Sound	PC	PC	6,682	37.35%	2,184	12.21%	74.58%	6,682	3,763	2,947	4,498	–	–	17,890
Peel North	PC	PC	29,851	59.48%	18,592	37.04%	73.38%	29,851	9,080	11,259	–	–	–	50,190
Peel South	PC	PC	29,569	54.63%	17,282	31.93%	73.61%	29,569	12,287	12,266	–	–	–	54,122
Perth	Lib	Lib	16,265	54.31%	6,815	22.76%	74.35%	9,450	16,265	4,231	–	–	–	29,946
Peterborough	NDP	PC	18,632	42.69%	590	1.35%	77.67%	18,632	6,970	18,042	–	–	–	43,644
Port Arthur	Lib	NDP	11,461	45.06%	1,369	5.38%	75.47%	10,092	3,880	11,461	–	–	–	25,433
Prescott and Russell	PC	PC	10,950	51.84%	5,499	26.03%	75.01%	10,950	5,451	4,723	–	–	–	21,124
Prince Edward—Lennox	PC	PC	9,995	52.78%	3,404	17.98%	74.09%	9,995	6,591	2,350	–	–	–	18,936
Quinte	PC	PC	15,066	57.36%	7,455	28.38%	67.52%	15,066	7,611	3,588	–	–	–	26,265
Rainy River	LL	Lib	6,115	50.00%	2,206	18.04%	72.30%	2,207	6,115	3,909	–	–	–	12,231
Renfrew North	PC	PC	11,980	51.76%	3,517	15.20%	71.42%	11,980	8,463	2,516	185	–	–	23,144
Renfrew South	PC	PC	9,370	53.87%	3,353	19.28%	79.83%	9,370	6,017	2,008	–	–	–	17,395
St. Catharines	PC	PC	16,074	43.92%	5,627	15.37%	68.01%	16,074	10,080	10,447	–	–	–	36,601
Sandwich—Riverside	NDP	NDP	17,944	50.24%	8,592	24.05%	74.86%	9,352	8,424	17,944	–	–	–	35,720
Sarnia	Lib	Lib	14,422	52.44%	6,884	25.03%	67.23%	7,538	14,422	5,544	–	–	–	27,504
Sault Ste. Marie	PC	PC	14,983	43.00%	1,035	2.97%	79.24%	14,983	5,915	13,948	–	–	–	34,846
Simcoe Centre	PC	PC	17,067	55.98%	9,192	30.15%	72.30%	17,067	7,875	5,543	–	–	–	30,485
Simcoe East	PC	PC	12,109	48.41%	5,468	21.86%	73.33%	12,109	6,264	6,641	–	–	–	25,014
Stormont	PC	PC	13,378	58.09%	7,099	30.83%	68.46%	13,378	3,372	6,279	–	–	–	23,029
Sudbury	Lib	NDP	11,905	40.92%	2,770	9.52%	70.16%	8,053	9,135	11,905	–	–	–	29,093
Sudbury East	NDP	NDP	15,522	53.62%	8,457	29.21%	71.69%	6,363	7,065	15,522	–	–	–	28,950
Thunder Bay	NDP	NDP	6,996	55.03%	3,882	30.54%	75.38%	3,114	2,602	6,996	–	–	–	12,712
Temiskaming	NDP	PC	9,695	47.22%	2,154	10.49%	74.88%	9,695	3,297	7,541	–	–	–	20,533
Victoria—Haliburton	PC	PC	10,368	48.88%	2,119	9.99%	74.78%	10,368	8,249	2,595	–	–	–	21,212
Waterloo North	Lib	Lib	15,035	39.41%	2,438	6.39%	72.90%	12,597	15,035	10,162	359	–	–	38,153
Waterloo South	PC	PC	15,165	50.40%	4,543	15.10%	76.08%	15,165	4,302	10,622	–	–	–	30,089
Welland	PC	PC	15,044	50.19%	5,157	17.20%	79.87%	15,044	5,046	9,887	–	–	–	29,977
Welland South	Lib	Lib	8,845	36.35%	438	1.80%	74.09%	8,407	8,845	7,082	–	–	–	24,334
Wellington—Dufferin	PC	PC	8,250	51.11%	3,383	20.96%	71.41%	8,250	4,867	2,559	467	–	–	16,143
Wellington South	Lib	Lib	16,606	45.94%	6,856	18.97%	74.54%	9,750	16,606	9,161	630	–	–	36,147
Wentworth	NDP	NDP	14,128	43.82%	3,937	12.21%	70.84%	10,191	7,920	14,128	–	–	–	32,239
Wentworth North	PC	PC	12,489	45.35%	4,279	15.54%	80.74%	12,489	8,210	6,842	–	–	–	27,541
Windsor—Walkerville	Lib	Lib	12,986	44.83%	976	3.37%	74.84%	3,974	12,986	12,010	–	–	–	28,970
Windsor West	NDP	NDP	13,119	42.98%	3,444	11.28%	72.33%	9,675	7,731	13,119	–	–	–	30,525
York Centre	Lib	Lib	14,885	42.28%	212	0.60%	73.79%	14,673	14,885	5,645	–	–	–	35,203
York North	PC	PC	15,557	52.39%	7,514	25.30%	73.16%	15,557	6,094	8,043	–	–	–	29,694
Armourdale	PC	PC	16,055	49.99%	7,511	23.39%	74.05%	16,055	8,544	7,519	–	–	–	32,118
Beaches—Woodbine	NDP	PC	13,768	49.25%	2,630	9.41%	73.73%	13,768	2,819	11,138	88	–	145	27,958
Bellwoods	PC	PC	7,443	51.71%	3,839	26.67%	69.73%	7,443	3,347	3,604	–	–	–	14,394
Don Mills	PC	PC	16,102	50.80%	5,986	18.88%	74.18%	16,102	5,481	10,116	–	–	–	31,699
Dovercourt	Lib	PC	6,183	34.60%	39	0.22%	66.65%	6,183	5,116	6,144	–	429	–	17,872
Downsview	Lib	Lib	17,140	52.25%	6,219	18.96%	68.42%	4,740	17,140	10,921	–	–	–	32,801
Eglinton	PC	PC	20,242	57.06%	10,005	28.20%	78.82%	20,242	10,237	4,819	180	–	–	35,478
Etobicoke	Lib	Lib	16,676	39.79%	943	2.25%	75.56%	15,733	16,676	9,072	432	–	–	41,913
High Park	NDP	NDP	16,509	54.58%	7,282	24.07%	74.39%	9,227	4,284	16,509	–	–	229	30,249
Humber	Lib	PC	11,235	41.48%	3,055	11.28%	72.61%	11,235	7,673	8,180	–	–	–	27,088
Lakeshore	NDP	NDP	10,867	42.36%	735	2.87%	75.42%	10,132	4,653	10,867	–	–	–	25,652
Parkdale	Lib	NDP	5,994	36.37%	436	2.65%	66.60%	4,930	5,558	5,994	–	–	–	16,482
Riverdale	NDP	NDP	11,132	49.27%	2,518	11.14%	65.04%	8,614	2,503	11,132	–	–	346	22,595
St. Andrew—St. Patrick	PC	PC	9,588	46.61%	1,137	5.53%	68.33%	9,588	1,860	8,451	275	231	164	20,569
St. David	PC	PC	13,320	50.07%	5,291	19.89%	70.46%	13,320	4,934	8,029	–	–	320	26,603
St. George	PC	PC	16,916	55.44%	9,492	31.11%	67.58%	16,916	7,424	5,801	374	–	–	30,515
Scarborough Centre	NDP	PC	15,781	48.36%	4,873	14.93%	73.04%	15,781	4,962	10,908	984	–	–	32,635
Scarborough East	Lib	PC	13,206	40.94%	670	2.08%	73.51%	13,206	12,536	6,514	–	–	–	32,256
Scarborough North	PC	PC	24,982	56.16%	12,023	27.03%	80.39%	24,982	6,235	12,959	308	–	–	44,484
Scarborough West	NDP	NDP	13,092	38.96%	170	0.51%	73.50%	12,922	7,594	13,092	–	–	–	33,608
York East	PC	PC	17,830	50.69%	7,890	22.43%	74.83%	17,830	9,940	7,402	–	–	–	35,172
York-Forest Hill	PC	Lib	13,870	41.52%	1,300	3.89%	72.89%	12,570	13,870	6,963	–	–	–	33,403
York Mills	PC	PC	41,629	59.12%	23,007	32.68%	73.87%	41,629	18,622	10,159	–	–	–	70,410
York South	NDP	NDP	12,915	48.01%	2,877	10.69%	69.53%	10,038	3,949	12,915	–	–	–	26,902
York West	PC	PC	26,034	59.41%	13,582	30.99%	77.66%	26,034	12,452	5,335	–	–	–	43,821
Yorkview	NDP	NDP	20,660	43.38%	6,630	13.92%	71.37%	12,550	14,030	20,660	–	391	–	47,631

= open seat
= turnout is above provincial average
= winning candidate was in previous Legislature
= not incumbent; was previously elected to the Legislature
= incumbent had switched allegiance
= incumbency arose from byelection gain
= previously incumbent in another riding
= other incumbents renominated

=== Analysis ===
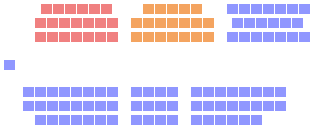
29th Legislature

Party candidates in 2nd place
Party in 1st place	Party in 2nd place				Total
Party in 1st place	PC	Lib	NDP	Ind	Total
Progressive Conservative		40	37	1	78
Liberal	15		5		20
New Democratic	15	4			19
Total	30	44	42	1	117

Candidates ranked 1st to 5th place, by party
Parties	1st	2nd	3rd	4th	5th
█ Progressive Conservative	78	30	9		
█ Liberal	20	44	53		
█ New Democratic	19	42	54	2	
█ Independent		1	1	20	1
█ Social Credit				4	
█ Communist				3	2

Resulting composition of the 28th Legislative Assembly
Source		Party			
Source		PC	Lib	NDP	Total
Seats retained	Incumbents returned	50	17	13	80
Seats retained	Open seats held	15		1	16
Seats retained	Byelection loss reversed	1			1
Seats changing hands	Incumbents defeated	10	1	2	13
Seats changing hands	Open seats gained	2	1	3	6
Seats changing hands	Incumbent changed allegiance		1		1
Total		78	20	19	117

=== Seats changing hands ===
Of the 117 seats, 22 were open because of MPPs who chose not to stand for reelection, and voters in only 19 seats changed allegiance from the previous election in 2018.

Tom Reid (Rainy River) had previously campaigned on the Liberal-Labour ticket, but sat with the Liberal caucus. In 1971, he opted to stand as a Liberal instead.

Elections to the 29th Legislative Assembly of Ontario – seats won/lost by party, 1967-1971
Party	1967	Gain from (loss to)						1971
Party	1967	PC		Lib		NDP		1971
Progressive Conservative	69			6	(1)	6	(2)	78
Liberal	28	2	(6)				(4)	20
New Democratic	20	1	(6)	4				19
Total	117	3	(12)	10	(1)	6	(6)	117

There were 19 seats that changed allegiance in the election:

PC to Liberal

- Ottawa East
- York-Forest Hill

PC to NDP

- Nickel Belt

Liberal to PC

- Algoma—Manitoulin
- Niagara Falls
- Oxford
- Dovercourt
- Humber
- Scarborough East

Liberal to NDP

- Ottawa Centre
- Port Arthur
- Sudbury
- Parkdale

NDP to PC

- Brantford
- Oshawa
- Peterborough
- Temiskaming
- Beaches—Woodbine
- Scarborough Centre

== See also ==
- Politics of Ontario
- List of Ontario political parties
- Premier of Ontario
- Leader of the Opposition (Ontario)
