= Jackson House =

Jackson House may refer to:

== Canada ==
- George Jackson House (Toronto), historic house in Toronto, Ontario

== United States ==
(by state then city)

- Jefferson Franklin Jackson House, Montgomery, Alabama
- E.B. Jackson House, Yuma, Arizona, NRHP-listed in Yuma County
- Jackson House (Bentonville, Arkansas)
- Jackson House (Fayetteville, Arkansas)
- Floyd Jackson House, Hardy, Arkansas
- Jackson–Herget House, Paragould, Arkansas
- George Jackson House (Ridgway, Colorado), NRHP-listed in Ouray County
- F.A. Jackson House, Salida, Colorado, NRHP-listed in Chaffee County
- Captain William Parker Jackson House, Tampa, Florida
- Jackson Rooming House, Tampa Florida
- George W. Jackson House, Baconton, Georgia
- John S. Jackson Plantation House and Outbuildings, White Plains, Georgia, NRHP-listed in Hancock County
- Jackson–Johns House, Winder, Georgia, NRHP-listed in Barrow County
- Orville Jackson House, Eagle, Idaho
- Jackson–Swisher House and Carriage House, Iowa City, Iowa
- Jackson–McConnell House, Junction City, Kansas, NRHP-listed in Geary County
- Eli Jackson House, Eminence, Kentucky, NRHP-listed in Shelby County
- Beckley Jackson House, Hanson, Kentucky
- Jackson House (DeQuincy, Louisiana), NRHP-listed in Calcasieu Parish
- Jackson House (Winnsboro, Louisiana)
- Dr. F.W. Jackson House, Jefferson, Maine
- Sen. William P. Jackson House, Salisbury, Maryland
- Thaddeus Jackson House, Brookline, Massachusetts
- Jackson House (Newton, Massachusetts)
- Samuel Jackson, Jr. House, Newton, Massachusetts
- Jackson Homestead, Newton, Massachusetts
- Mitchell Jackson Farmhouse, Lakeland, Minnesota
- Jackson–Niles House, Kosciusko, Mississippi, NRHP-listed in Attala County
- Jackson–Browne House, Kosciusko, Mississippi, NRHP-listed in Attala County
- Prior Jackson Homeplace, Fayette, Missouri
- Jackson–Einspahr Sod House, Holstein, Nebraska
- Richard Jackson House, Portsmouth, New Hampshire
- Joseph Jackson House, Rockaway Borough, New Jersey
- Jackson House (Alamogordo, New Mexico)
- J.B. Jackson House, Santa Fe, New Mexico, NRHP-listed in Santa Fe County
- Jackson–Perkins House, Newark, New York
- Samuel and Elbert Jackson House, Wantagh, New York
- Jacob Jackson Farm, Hillsborough, North Carolina
- Jesse Jackson House, Kinston, North Carolina
- Andrew Jackson House, Akron, Ohio, NRHP-listed in Summit County
- C. S. "Sam" Jackson Log House, Oregon City, Oregon, NRHP-listed in Clackamas County
- Jackson Mansion and Carriage House, Berwick, Pennsylvania
- A. J. Jackson House, Stamford, Texas, NRHP-listed in Jones County
- Samuel Jackson House, Beaver, Utah
- Stonewall Jackson House, Lexington, Virginia
- John R. Jackson House, Chehalis, Washington
- Jackson House (Hartland, Wisconsin), NRHP-listed in Waukesha County

== See also ==
- George Jackson House (disambiguation)
