= George Jackson House =

George Jackson House may refer to:

in Canada

- George Jackson House (Toronto), Ontario

in the United States

- George Jackson House (Ridgway, Colorado), listed on the National Register of Historic Places (NRHP) in Ouray County
- George W. Jackson House, Baconton, Georgia, NRHP-listed in Mitchell County

== See also ==
- Jackson House (disambiguation)
