= Derwyn Shea =

Canadian politician

Ontario MPP
- In office 1995–1999
- Preceded by: Elaine Ziemba
- Succeeded by: Riding abolished
- Constituency: High Park—Swansea

Metro Councillor
- In office 1985–1994
- Preceded by: New office
- Succeeded by: David Miller
- Constituency: High Park

City Councillor
- In office 1982–1985 Serving with William Boytchuk
- Preceded by: William Boytchuk and David White
- Succeeded by: William Boytchuk (one city councillor)
- Constituency: Ward 1 (High Park-Swansea)

Personal details
- Born: September 1, 1937 Hamilton, Ontario
- Died: August 15, 2015 (aged 77) Toronto, Ontario
- Party: Progressive Conservative
- Spouse: Julia (died 2009)
- Occupation: Church rector

Derwyn Spencer Shea (September 1, 1937 – August 15, 2015) was an Anglican Church of Canada clergyman and politician in Ontario, Canada. He was a municipal politician in the city of Toronto for 12 years, and sat as a Progressive Conservative member of the Legislative Assembly of Ontario from 1995 to 1999, representing the riding of High Park—Swansea.

== Background ==
Shea was born in Hamilton, Ontario, but moved to Toronto at the age of two. He was educated at the University of Toronto, the University of Western Ontario, and Laurentian University receiving a Bachelor of Arts degree (magna cum laude), a Master of Arts degree in urban history and structure, a Dip.Th (Huron College), a Th.B (American Divinity) and a Doctor of Divinity (Canada College), honoris causa. His pastoral clinical studies were taken at McMaster University.

Shea was ordained in 1966 as an Anglican priest, and worked in the dioceses of Saskatchewan, Algoma and Toronto. He founded the Eastview Neighbourhood Association for latchkey youth in Toronto's east end, and was co-author of the benchmark East Toronto Deanery Study. He was the first Canadian to receive a Fellowship from the Academy of Parish Clergy, and was involved in Ugandan relief efforts.

== Municipal politics ==
Shea was a member of the city of Toronto's Planning Board from 1972 to 1982 including 4 years as chairman, when he was elected in his first attempt as senior alderman in Toronto's ward 1. From 1985 to 1994, he represented Toronto-High Park on the Metropolitan Toronto council. As a member of council he served with a number of agencies, boards and commissions. He was variously a police commissioner and a commissioner of Toronto Hydro as well as president of the Canadian National Exhibition, governor of Exhibition Place and chair of the O'Keefe Centre and served on a number of hospital boards including Toronto General, Toronto Western, Princess Margaret and Runnymede Chronic Care.

== Provincial politics ==
In the 1995 provincial election, Shea defeated New Democratic Party cabinet minister and incumbent Elaine Ziemba by about 1,500 votes. He was a backbench supporter of Mike Harris's caucus for the next four years, serving as parliamentary assistant for the Minister of Municipal Affairs and Housing and then as parliamentary assistant for the Citizenship, Culture, and Recreation.

== Later life ==
He retired from the legislature in 1999 and returned to his position as rector of St. Clement's (Riverdale) Anglican Church. In 2000, Shea initiated and was later elected founding chair of the Ontario Association of Former Parliamentarians. In 1999 Shea was inducted as rector of St Hilda's parish in Toronto and Chairman and CEO of St Hilda's Towers, a 500-bed independent and assisted living seniors residence including extended convalescent care facilities. In 2002 he was installed as a canon in the Diocese of Toronto.

In 2004, Shea endorsed Frank Klees's bid to lead the Ontario PC Party. In 2007 Shea was appointed by the government of Canada to the 9 member National Seniors Council and in the same year he completed his training with the International Elections Monitoring Institute.

A friend of Mike Harris's, he officiated the former Premier's wedding to Laura Maguire in 2005.

Shea died of cancer at Toronto General Hospital on August 15, 2015, at age 77. He was predeceased by his wife, Julia, and survived by his partner, Christine Schubert.
