= High Park (provincial electoral district) =

Former provincial electoral district in Ontario, Canada

Ontario electoral district
- High Park, in relation to the other Toronto ridings, after the 1926 redistribution.

Defunct provincial electoral district
- Legislature: Legislative Assembly of Ontario
- District created: 1925
- District abolished: 1975
- First contested: 1926
- Last contested: 1971

Demographics
- Census division: Toronto
- Census subdivision: Toronto

High Park was a provincial electoral district in the west-end of the old City of Toronto, Ontario, Canada. It was represented in the Legislative Assembly of Ontario from 1926 to 1975. It was mostly redistributed into the High Park—Swansea electoral district for the 1975 Ontario general election.

The High Park provincial electoral district was notable for its electors defeating the incumbent Premier, and their Member of Provincial Parliament, George Drew, in the 1948 provincial election. He lost his seat over the issue of temperance; even though his Conservatives were returned with a majority government. The old City of West Toronto Junction had been an alcohol-free area since even before it was annexed by Toronto back in 1909, and those "dry-laws" were still current at the time of the 1948 election. So when Drew's government passed a new law that allowed "cocktail bars" to open in the province, his local constituents were not pleased, allowing temperance movement activist, "Temperance Bill" Temple of the Ontario Co-operative Commonwealth Federation to win.

The provincial riding had a number of colourful Members of Provincial Parliament (MPPs) including Drew, and his successor William Horace Temple as well as the district's final representative, Doctor Morton Shulman. The district was abolished during the 1975 redistribution, placing most of it in the new High Park—Swansea district. As of 2024, the territory it represented belongs in the current Parkdale—High Park, York South—Weston and Davenport districts.

== Members of Provincial Parliament ==
High Park
Assembly	Years	Member	Party
Prior to 1926 part of York West constituency
17th	1926–1929	William Baird (Note: In 1938, the title of Member of the Legislative Assembly was changed to Member of Provincial Parliament.) (Note: Baird died in 1940. The seat remained vacant until 1943.)	Conservative
18th	1929–1934	William Baird	Conservative
19th	1934–1937	William Baird	Conservative
20th	1937–1943	William Baird	Conservative
21st	1943–1945	George Drew	Conservative
22nd	1945–1948	George Drew	Conservative
23rd	1948–1951	William Temple	Co-operative Commonwealth
24th	1951–1955	Alf Cowling	Progressive Conservative
25th	1955–1959	Alf Cowling	Progressive Conservative
26th	1959–1963	Alf Cowling	Progressive Conservative
27th	1963–1967	Alf Cowling	Progressive Conservative
28th	1967–1971	Morton Shulman	New Democratic
29th	1971–1975	Morton Shulman	New Democratic
Sourced from the Ontario Legislative Assembly
Merged into High Park—Swansea and Parkdale constituencies after 1975

== Election results ==
=== 1967 electoral boundaries ===
1971 Ontario general election
Party	Candidate	Votes	%	±%
New Democratic	Morton Shulman	16,509	54.58	+4.97
Progressive Conservative	Yuri Shymko	9,227	30.50	+5.58
Liberal	Laima Svegzda	4,284	14.16	–11.30
Social Credit	Geza Matrai	229	0.76	–
Total valid votes		30,249	99.09	
Total rejected ballots		278	0.91	–0.47
Turnout		30,527	74.39	+3.76
Eligible voters		41,037		
New Democratic hold		Swing		–0.31
Source: Elections Ontario

1967 Ontario general election
Party	Candidate	Votes	%	±%
New Democratic	Morton Shulman	12,892	49.61	+30.61
Liberal	Paul Staniszewski	6,617	25.46	–12.24
Progressive Conservative	Alfred Hozack Cowling	6,477	24.92	–17.73
Total valid votes		25,986	98.62	
Total rejected ballots		363	1.38	+0.40
Turnout		26,349	70.63	+6.09
Eligible voters		37,307		
New Democratic gain from Progressive Conservative		Swing		+21.42
Source: Elections Ontario

=== 1963 electoral boundaries ===
1963 Ontario general election
Party	Candidate	Votes	%	±%
Progressive Conservative	Alfred Hozack Cowling	7,676	42.66	+4.81
Liberal	Paul Staniszewski	6,785	37.70	+2.83
New Democratic	Andrew W. Mays	3,420	19.01	–5.95
Social Credit	R. A. Reesor	114	0.63	–
Total valid votes		17,995	99.03	
Total rejected ballots		177	0.97	–0.60
Turnout		18,172	64.53	+7.34
Eligible voters		28,159		
Progressive Conservative hold		Swing		+0.99
Source: Elections Ontario

=== 1955 electoral boundaries ===
1959 Ontario general election
Party	Candidate	Votes	%	±%
Progressive Conservative	Alfred Hozack Cowling	6,414	37.85	–4.54
Liberal	Paul Staniszewski	5,910	34.87	+10.77
Co-operative Commonwealth	William Horace Temple	4,229	24.95	–6.16
Labor–Progressive	John Weir	394	2.32	–0.06
Total valid votes		16,947	98.43	
Total rejected ballots		271	1.57	–0.31
Turnout		17,218	57.20	–1.54
Eligible voters		30,104		
Progressive Conservative hold		Swing		–7.65
Source: Elections Ontario

1955 Ontario general election
Party	Candidate	Votes	%	±%
Progressive Conservative	Alfred Hozack Cowling	7,723	42.39	–1.91
Co-operative Commonwealth	William Horace Temple	5,669	31.12	–2.93
Liberal	Herbert W. Powell	4,392	24.11	+2.45
Labor–Progressive	Helen Weir	435	2.39	–
Total valid votes		18,219	98.12	
Total rejected ballots		349	1.88	+0.74
Turnout		18,568	58.74	–8.93
Eligible voters		31,612		
Progressive Conservative hold		Swing		+0.51
Source: Elections Ontario

=== 1951 electoral boundaries ===
1951 Ontario general election
Party	Candidate	Votes	%	±%
Progressive Conservative	Alfred Hozack Cowling	10,360	44.30	+5.77
Co-operative Commonwealth	William Horace Temple	7,961	34.04	–8.20
Liberal	Earl Selkirk	5,065	21.66	+2.43
Total valid votes		23,386	98.86	
Total rejected ballots		270	1.14	+0.11
Turnout		23,656	67.67	–7.21
Eligible voters		34,960		
Progressive Conservative gain from Co-operative Commonwealth		Swing		+6.99
Source: Elections Ontario

=== 1943 electoral boundaries ===
1948 Ontario general election
Party	Candidate	Votes	%	±%
Co-operative Commonwealth	William Horace Temple	11,562	42.24	–0.57
Progressive Conservative	George A. Drew	10,545	38.53	–18.66
Liberal	Howard B. Stevens	5,262	19.23	–
Total valid votes		27,369	98.97	
Total rejected ballots		284	1.03	+0.02
Turnout		27,653	74.88	+2.44
Eligible voters		36,930		
Co-operative Commonwealth gain from Progressive Conservative		Swing		+9.04
Source: Elections Ontario

1945 Ontario general election
Party	Candidate	Votes	%	±%
Progressive Conservative	George A. Drew	15,238	57.19	+15.35
Co-operative Commonwealth	Lewis Duncan	11,408	42.81	+3.43
Total valid votes		26,646	98.99	
Total rejected ballots		272	1.01	+0.06
Turnout		26,918	72.44	+13.40
Eligible voters		37,160		
Progressive Conservative hold		Swing		+5.96
Source: Elections Ontario

1943 Ontario general election
Party	Candidate	Votes	%	±%
Progressive Conservative	George A. Drew	7,953	41.83	–5.11
Co-operative Commonwealth	William Horace Temple	7,487	39.38	+3.13
Liberal	Leonard A. Leslie	3,422	18.00	+1.20
Labour	William Blackwood Hendry	149	0.78	–
Total valid votes		19,011	99.05	
Total rejected ballots		182	0.95	–0.02
Turnout		19,193	59.03	–5.39
Eligible voters		32,512		
Progressive Conservative hold		Swing		–4.12
Source: Elections Ontario

=== 1934 electoral boundaries ===
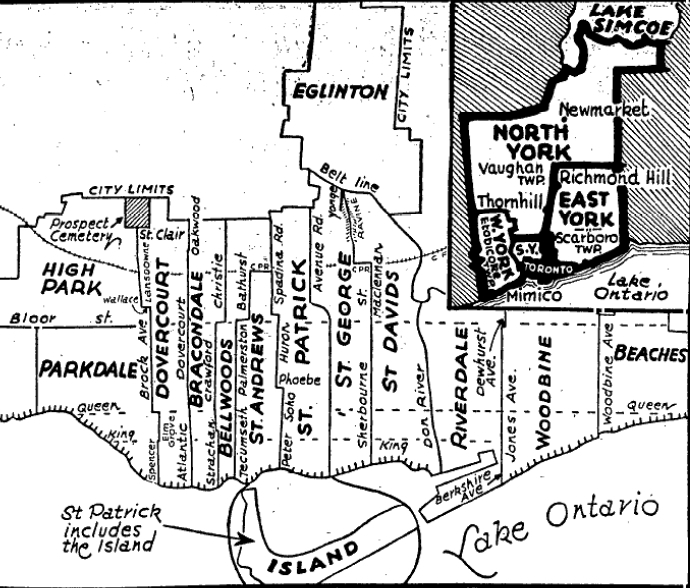
Toronto riding boundaries after 1934 redistribution

1937 Ontario general election
Party	Candidate	Votes	%	±%
Conservative	William Alexander Baird	9,443	46.95	+4.81
Co-operative Commonwealth	Burton A. Ritchie	7,291	36.25	+15.84
Liberal	Carroll Langford Coburn	3,380	16.80	–20.65
Total valid votes		20,114	99.03	
Total rejected ballots		197	0.97	+0.03
Turnout		20,311	64.43	–3.65
Eligible voters		31,525		
Conservative hold		Swing		–5.52
Source: Elections Ontario

1934 Ontario general election
Party	Candidate	Votes	%	±%
Conservative	William Alexander Baird	8,934	42.14	–22.25
Liberal	James G. Culnan	7,941	37.45	–
Co-operative Commonwealth	D. M. LeBourdais	4,327	20.41	–
Total valid votes		21,202	99.06	
Total rejected ballots		202	0.94	+0.27
Turnout		21,404	68.08	+19.78
Eligible voters		31,439		
Conservative hold		Swing		–11.12
Source: Elections Ontario

=== 1926 electoral boundaries ===
1929 Ontario general election
Party	Candidate	Votes	%	±%
Conservative	William Alexander Baird	8,447	64.39	+3.26
Prohibitionist	Minerva Reid	4,672	35.61	–3.26
Total valid votes		13,119	99.33	
Total rejected ballots		89	0.67	+0.10
Turnout		13,208	48.30	–28.26
Eligible voters		27,347		
Conservative hold		Swing		+3.26
Source: Elections Ontario

1926 Ontario general election
Party	Candidate	Votes	%
Conservative	William Alexander Baird	10,466	61.13
Prohibitionist	Levi (M.A.) McMaster	6,656	38.87
Total valid votes		17,122	99.43
Total rejected ballots		99	0.57
Turnout		17,221	76.55
Eligible voters		22,495	
Conservative pickup new district.			
Source: Elections Ontario

== See also ==
- List of Ontario provincial electoral districts
- Canadian provincial electoral districts
