= David Fleet =

Canadian politician

Ontario MPP
- In office 1987–1990
- Preceded by: Yuri Shymko
- Succeeded by: Elaine Ziemba
- Constituency: High Park-Swansea

Personal details
- Born: March 3, 1954 (age 72) Toronto, Ontario, Canada
- Party: Liberal
- Spouse: Cathy
- Children: 3
- Occupation: Tax assessor

David Gordon Fleet (born March 3, 1954) is a former politician in Ontario, Canada. He was a Liberal member of the Legislative Assembly of Ontario from 1987 to 1990 who represented the riding of High Park-Swansea.

== Background ==
Fleet was educated at the University of Western Ontario, Osgoode Hall Law School and York University. He was a lawyer before entering political life. Fleet is an expert in assessment tax matters and now works in this field. David lives in High Park with his wife Cathy. He has three university-aged children, Alana, Blake, and Erica.

== Politics ==
He was elected to the Ontario legislature in the 1987 provincial election, defeating Progressive Conservative incumbent Yuri Shymko by 814 votes in the Toronto riding of High Park—Swansea. NDP candidate Elaine Ziemba was a very close third. For the next three years, Fleet served as a backbench supporter of David Peterson's government. In 1989-90, he served as parliamentary assistant to the Minister responsible for Women's Issues. He was also chair of the Standing Committee on regulations and public bills, and attempted to restrict the power of governments to enact legislation by regulations.

The Liberals lost to the NDP in the 1990 provincial election, and Fleet lost his seat in the legislature to Elaine Ziemba by more than 3,000 votes.
