= Elaine Ziemba =

Canadian politician

The Honourable Elaine Ziemba ECO

Ontario MPP
- In office 1990–1995
- Preceded by: David Fleet
- Succeeded by: Derwyn Shea
- Constituency: High Park-Swansea

Minister of Citizenship
- In office 1990–1995
- Preceded by: Bob Wong
- Succeeded by: Marilyn Mushinski

Personal details
- Born: 1942 (age 83–84) Toronto, Ontario, Canada
- Party: New Democratic Party
- Children: 2
- Relatives: Ed Ziemba (brother-in-law)
- Occupation: Executive director

Elaine Ziemba (born c. 1942) is a former Canadian politician in Ontario, Canada. She was a New Democratic Party member of the Legislative Assembly of Ontario from 1990 to 1995, and served as a cabinet minister in the government of Bob Rae.

== Background ==
Ziemba was born and raised in the west end Roncesvalles neighbourhood. Her family owned a television store. She was executive director of the St. Clair West Meals-on-Wheels and president of the Metro Toronto Federation of Community-based Seniors' Agencies, and was strongly involved in activities involving Toronto's Polish community. She also wrote articles on the history of canoeing in Canada during the 1980s. Her brother-in-law, Ed Ziemba, represented the Toronto riding of High Park—Swansea for the Ontario NDP from 1975 to 1981.

== Politics ==
Ziemba ran for Toronto city council in the 1980 election in Ward 2. She placed fourth behind Tony Ruprecht and Ben Grys.

=== Provincial politics ===
She ran for the Ontario legislature in the 1985 provincial election, but lost to Progressive Conservative incumbent Yuri Shymko by 330 votes. She ran again in the 1987 provincial election and finished third, behind Shymko and the winner, Liberal David Fleet.

The NDP won a majority government in the 1990 provincial election and Ziemba was elected over Fleet by over 3,000 votes. On October 1, 1990, Ziemba was appointed Minister of Citizenship with responsibility for disabled persons and seniors.

In 1992, Ziemba's department passed an "Advocacy Act" enshrining the right of consumers to accurate information. In 1996, the Tories repealed the legislation.

=== Employment equity ===
Ziemba's most controversial ministerial decisions involved the issue of employment equity. She was given control of this file at the beginning of the Rae government's mandate, and she hired Juanita Westmoreland-Traoré as an employment equity commissioner to draft legislation on the subject. Westmoreland-Traoré said that the purpose of employment equity was to remove cultural biases that prevent certain segments of society from getting good jobs. She said, "Targets for racial minorities, women, aboriginals and the disabled is the best way to "even the playing field" that's favored white males."

Premier Bob Rae argued that employment equity was a goal set out in the Liberal-NDP accord in 1985 but the Peterson government failed to act on it. He said the NDP were firmly opposed to quotas and that any law would be implemented gradually. Critics of the policy argued that the legislation would inevitably lead to quotas. Alan Borovoy of the Canadian Civil Liberties Association said, "We are concerned that a requirement of numerical goals could produce unfairness."

The Employment Equity Act was passed in December 1993 with implementation set to start on September 1, 1994. Opponents of the bill argued that while the goal of employment equity was laudable, the result of the bill would be discrimination against one section of society in favour another. Some felt the bill would encourage racist elements of society. In 1995 after the NDP defeat, the governing Tories under Mike Harris tabled the Job Quotas Repeal Act which removed all of the work done by Ziemba.

The NDP were defeated in the 1995 provincial election, and Ziemba lost to Progressive Conservative candidate Derwyn Shea by fewer than 2,000 votes.

=== Cabinet positions ===
Rae ministry, Province of Ontario (1990–1995)
Cabinet post (1)
Predecessor	Office	Successor
Bob Wong	Minister of Citizenship; 1990–1995; Also Responsible for human rights, the disabled, seniors and race relations.	Marilyn Mushinski

== Electoral record ==
1995 Ontario general election: High Park—Swansea
Party	Candidate	Votes	%	±%
Progressive Conservative	Derwyn Shea	10,559	38.77	+20.32
New Democratic	Elaine Ziemba	8,899	32.68	-12.44
Liberal	Ted Lojko	7,121	26.15	-6.05
Green	David Burman	368	1.35	+0.04
Natural Law	Greg Roberts	286	1.05	–
Total valid votes		27,233		

1990 Ontario general election: High Park—Swansea
Party	Candidate	Votes	%	±%
New Democratic	Elaine Ziemba	11,432	45.12	+13.69
Liberal	David Fleet	8,159	32.20	-2.36
Progressive Conservative	Yuri Pokaliwsky	4,674	18.45	-13.19
Family Coalition	Colum Tingle	409	1.61	–
Green	Bill Sengay	332	1.31	–
Libertarian	Michael Beech	331	1.31	-1.06
Total valid votes		25,337		

1987 Ontario general election: High Park—Swansea
Party	Candidate	Votes	%	±%
Liberal	David Fleet	9,637	34.56	+13.20
Progressive Conservative	Yuri Shymko	8,823	31.64	-6.49
New Democratic	Elaine Ziemba	8,764	31.43	-5.44
Libertarian	Bob Cumming	660	2.37	+0.46
Total valid votes		27,884		

1985 Ontario general election: High Park—Swansea
Party	Candidate	Votes	%
Progressive Conservative	Yuri Shymko	9,960	38.13
New Democratic	Elaine Ziemba	9,630	36.87
Liberal	John Rudnicki	5,578	21.36
Libertarian	Bob Cumming	498	1.91
Independent	Robert Seajkowski	244	0.93
Green	Andrew Scorer	209	0.80
Total valid votes		26,119	

1980 Toronto City Council election: Ward 2 (Parkdale and Brockton)	Vote	%
Tony Ruprecht (X)	9,447	38.22
Ben Grys	4,923	19.92
Susan Atkinson	4,907	19.85
Elaine Ziemba	4,137	16.74
Elaine Taylor	684	2.77
John Lauter	620	2.51
Total valid votes	24,718	–
