= Alfred Hozack Cowling =

Canadian politician

Alf Cowling

Ontario MPP
- In office 1951–1967
- Preceded by: Bill Temple
- Succeeded by: Morton Shulman
- Constituency: High Park

Personal details
- Born: October 15, 1911 Toronto, Ontario
- Died: November 18, 1996 (aged 85) Toronto, Ontario
- Party: Progressive Conservative
- Spouse: Betty Morris
- Children: 1

Alfred Hozack Cowling (October 15, 1911 – November 18, 1996) was a Canadian politician, who represented High Park in the Legislative Assembly of Ontario from 1951 to 1967 as a Progressive Conservative member.

== Background ==
Cowling was born in Toronto. He was one of three sons born to Eleanor May Hozack and Alfred Homer Cowling. He worked as an insurance salesman and, eventually became an executive at an insurance company in Toronto. Cowling was married to Jessie Elizabeth "Betty" Morris (1916-2008) and they had one son named William. Cowling is buried in Park Lawn Cemetery in Toronto.

== Politics ==
His first political office was as an Alderman in the City of Toronto, where he represented Ward 7, known as "West Toronto Junction". He won three times, in the municipal elections held in January 1949, January 1950, and December 1950. He did not run for re-election in the 1951 election.

Cowling was elected to the Ontario legislature in the general election in 1951, defeating incumbent Bill Temple by 2,399 votes. Cowling was re-elected in the general elections in 1955, 1959, and 1963. He served as a backbench member of the Leslie Frost and John Robarts majority Progressive Conservative governments and, during each term in office, he served on an average of eight Standing Committees. He was defeated in the 1967 provincial general election, coming in third place and losing to Ontario's Chief Coroner, the very outspoken Morton Shulman.

== Electoral record ==
1967 Ontario general election: High Park
Party	Candidate	Votes	%	±%
New Democratic	Morton Shulman	12,888	49.62	+30.60
Liberal	Paul Staniszewski	6,614	25.46	–12.09
Progressive Conservative	Alfred Cowling	6,475	24.93	–17.86
Total valid votes		25,977		
New Democratic gain		Swing		
Source(s): Canadian Press (1967-10-18). "Provincial election results in Metro ridings". The Toronto Daily Star. Toronto. p. 66.
