= High Park—Swansea =

Former provincial electoral district in Ontario, Canada

Ontario electoral district

Defunct provincial electoral district
- Legislature: Legislative Assembly of Ontario
- District created: 1975
- District abolished: 1999
- First contested: 1975
- Last contested: 1995

High Park—Swansea was a provincial electoral district in the west-end of the city of Toronto, Ontario, Canada. It was represented in the Legislative Assembly of Ontario from 1975 to 1999.

It was created during the 1975 riding redistribution, taking much of its territory from the defunct High Park riding. It was abolished in 1999, and redistributed into the Parkdale–High Park, York South—Weston and Davenport electoral districts, that followed the same boundaries as the federal ones.

== Members of Provincial Parliament ==
High Park—Swansea
Assembly	Years	Member	Party
Created in 1975 from parts of High Park riding
30th	1975–1977	Ed Ziemba	New Democratic
31st	1977–1981	Ed Ziemba	New Democratic
32nd	1981–1985	Yuri Shymko	Progressive Conservative
33rd	1985–1987	Yuri Shymko	Progressive Conservative
34th	1987–1990	David Fleet	Liberal
35th	1990–1995	Elaine Ziemba	New Democratic
36th	1995–1999	Derwyn Shea	Progressive Conservative
Sourced from the Ontario Legislative Assembly
Merged into Parkdale–High Park, York South—Weston and Davenport ridings after 1996

== Electoral results ==
=== 1987 electoral boundaries ===
1995 Ontario general election
Party	Candidate	Votes	%	±%
Progressive Conservative	Derwyn Shea	10,559	38.77	+20.33
New Democratic	Elaine Ziemba	8,899	32.68	–12.44
Liberal	Ted Lojko	7,121	26.15	–6.05
Green	David G. Burman	368	1.35	+0.04
Natural Law	Gregory Wayne Roberts	286	1.05	–
Total valid votes		27,233	98.50	
Total rejected, unmarked and declined ballots		416	1.50	+0.18
Turnout		27,649	70.36	+5.54
Eligible voters		39,294		
Progressive Conservative gain from New Democratic		Swing		+13.19
Source: Elections Ontario

1990 Ontario general election
Party	Candidate	Votes	%	±%
New Democratic	Elaine Ziemba	11,432	45.12	+13.69
Liberal	David Fleet	8,159	32.20	–2.36
Progressive Conservative	Yuri Polakiwsky	4,674	18.45	–13.19
Family Coalition	Colum Tingle	409	1.61	–
Green	Bill Senay	332	1.31	–
Libertarian	Michael C. Beech	331	1.31	–1.06
Total valid votes		25,337	98.68	
Total rejected, unmarked and declined ballots		339	1.32	+0.48
Turnout		25,676	64.83	+0.08
Eligible voters		39,606		
New Democratic gain from Liberal		Swing		+13.44
Source: Elections Ontario

1987 Ontario general election
Party	Candidate	Votes	%	±%
Liberal	David Fleet	9,637	34.56	+13.20
Progressive Conservative	Yuri Shymko	8,823	31.64	–6.49
New Democratic	Elaine Ziemba	8,764	31.43	–5.44
Libertarian	Bob Cumming	660	2.37	+0.46
Total valid votes		27,884	99.16	
Total rejected ballots		237	0.84	–0.06
Turnout		28,121	64.75	–5.10
Eligible voters		43,433		
Liberal gain from Progressive Conservative		Swing		+9.32
Source: Elections Ontario

=== 1975 electoral boundaries ===
1985 Ontario general election
Party	Candidate	Votes	%	±%
Progressive Conservative	Yuri Shymko	9,960	38.13	–8.87
New Democratic	Elaine Ziemba	9,630	36.87	+0.84
Liberal	John L. Rudnicki	5,578	21.36	+6.46
Libertarian	Bob Cumming	498	1.91	–0.17
Independent	Robert Szajkowski	244	0.93	–
Green	Andrew Scorer	209	0.80	–
Total valid votes		26,119	99.10	
Total rejected ballots		238	0.90	–0.06
Turnout		26,357	69.84	+5.38
Eligible voters		37,737		
Progressive Conservative hold		Swing		–4.86
Source: Elections Ontario

1981 Ontario general election
Party	Candidate	Votes	%	±%
Progressive Conservative	Yuri Shymko	11,473	47.01	+9.20
New Democratic	Ed Ziemba	8,793	36.03	–4.84
Liberal	Peter C. Simonelis	3,635	14.89	–4.33
Libertarian	Bob Cumming	507	2.08	+0.66
Total valid votes		24,408	99.03	
Total rejected ballots		238	0.97	+0.18
Turnout		24,646	64.46	–1.87
Eligible voters		38,235		
Progressive Conservative gain from New Democratic		Swing		+7.02
Source: Elections Ontario

1977 Ontario general election
Party	Candidate	Votes	%	±%
New Democratic	Ed Ziemba	10,409	40.86	+1.02
Progressive Conservative	Bill Boytchuk	9,630	37.80	+5.19
Liberal	Ted Ives	4,897	19.22	–6.39
Libertarian	Robert McKay	360	1.41	+0.39
Communist	Christian Negre	177	0.69	–
Total valid votes		25,473	99.21	
Total rejected ballots		202	0.79	+0.04
Turnout		25,675	66.33	–2.30
Eligible voters		38,708		
New Democratic hold		Swing		–2.08
Source: Elections Ontario

1975 Ontario general election
Party	Candidate	Votes	%
New Democratic	Ed Ziemba	10,172	39.84
Progressive Conservative	Yuri Shymko	8,328	32.62
Liberal	Ed Negridge	6,540	25.61
Libertarian	Ann Noble	260	1.02
Independent	Steve Amsel	233	0.91
Total valid votes		25,533	99.26
Total rejected ballots		191	0.74
Turnout		25,724	68.63
Eligible voters		37,484	
New Democratic pickup new district.			
Source: Elections Ontario

== See also ==
- List of Ontario provincial electoral districts
- Canadian provincial electoral districts
