= Downsview Complex =

Office site in Ontario, Canada

Coordinates: 43.72280°N 79.48637°W

The Downsview Complex is a provincial office site located in the Downsview neighbourhood of Toronto, Ontario, Canada.

== History ==
First developed in the 1950s during the construction of Ontario Highway 401 and residential neighbourhood from former farmland, the site is currently the location of the Ministry of Transportation's Toronto office (and part of the overall HQ staff) and the Ontario Provincial Police's Downsview detachment.

== Re-development ==
In 2010, re-development of the site began, in a plan expected to be implemented over a 20-year span.

First to be built was the new location for the province's Ontario Centre of Forensic Sciences and Coroner's office (re-located from downtown Toronto) on Wilson Avenue and Morton Shulman Avenue. This facility was completed in February 2013 and opened in July 2013.

Construction also began on a new Humber River Regional Hospital, which replaced three nearby hospitals (Humber Memorial Hospital Church Street site in Weston, York-Finch Hospital on Finch Avenue, and Northwestern General Hospital on Keele Street). The new hospital opened in October 2015 and is North America's first fully digital hospital. As of April 2026, the new hospital will be renamed the Hennick Humber Hospital in honour of a $50 million philanthropic donation made by the Hennick Family Foundation.

Other provincial offices will be built on the site. Some of the older Ministry of Transportation buildings located there will be demolished.

The OPP detachment will remain on the site.

New roads will be built to provide easier access into the complex:

- Sir William Hearst Avenue, the entrance from Keele Street
- two named roadways from Wilson Avenue:
  - Morton Shulman Avenue - named for former Toronto coroner and politician Morton Shulman (formerly Agate Road)
  - Petherhill Avenue
