= Yuri Shymko =

Canadian politician

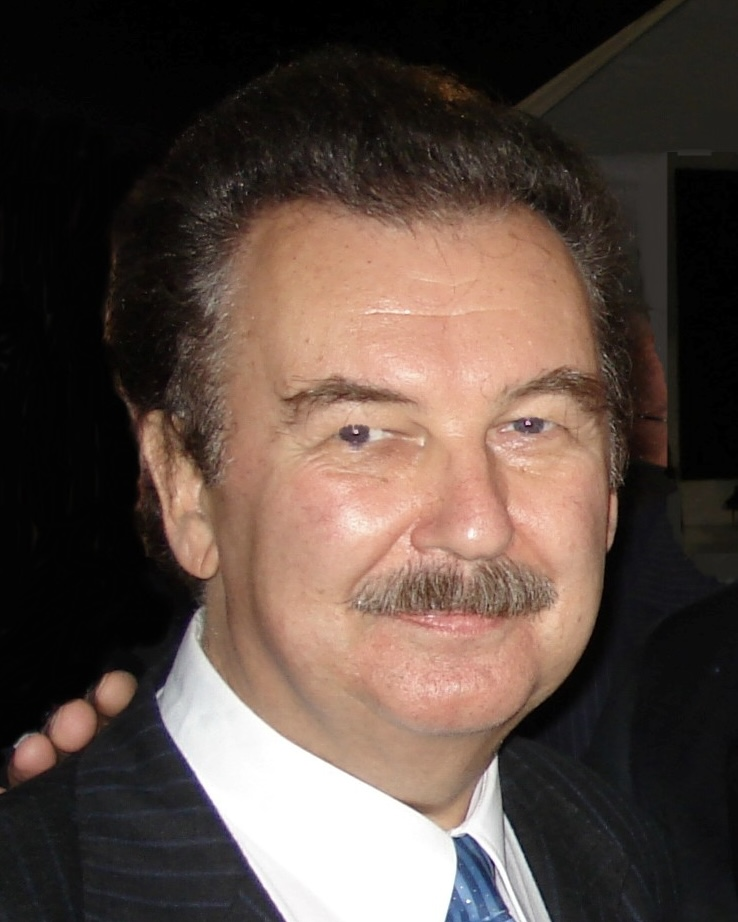
- Yuri Shymko, 2006

7th President of the World Congress of Free Ukrainians
- In office 1988–1993
- Preceded by: Peter Savaryn
- Succeeded by: Dmytro Cipywnyk

Member of the Ontario Provincial Parliament for High Park-Swansea
- In office March 19, 1981 – September 7, 1987
- Preceded by: Ed Ziemba
- Succeeded by: David Fleet

Member of the Canadian Parliament for Parkdale
- In office October 16, 1978 – May 22, 1979
- Preceded by: Stanley Haidasz
- Succeeded by: Jesse Flis

Personal details
- Born: September 6, 1940 (age 85) Cosel, Province of Silesia, (Germany) modern Koźle, Poland
- Party: PC (Federal, 1978-1979); Ontario PC (Provincial, 1981-1987)
- Spouse: Stephanie Kowal
- Children: 2
- Occupation: Consultant

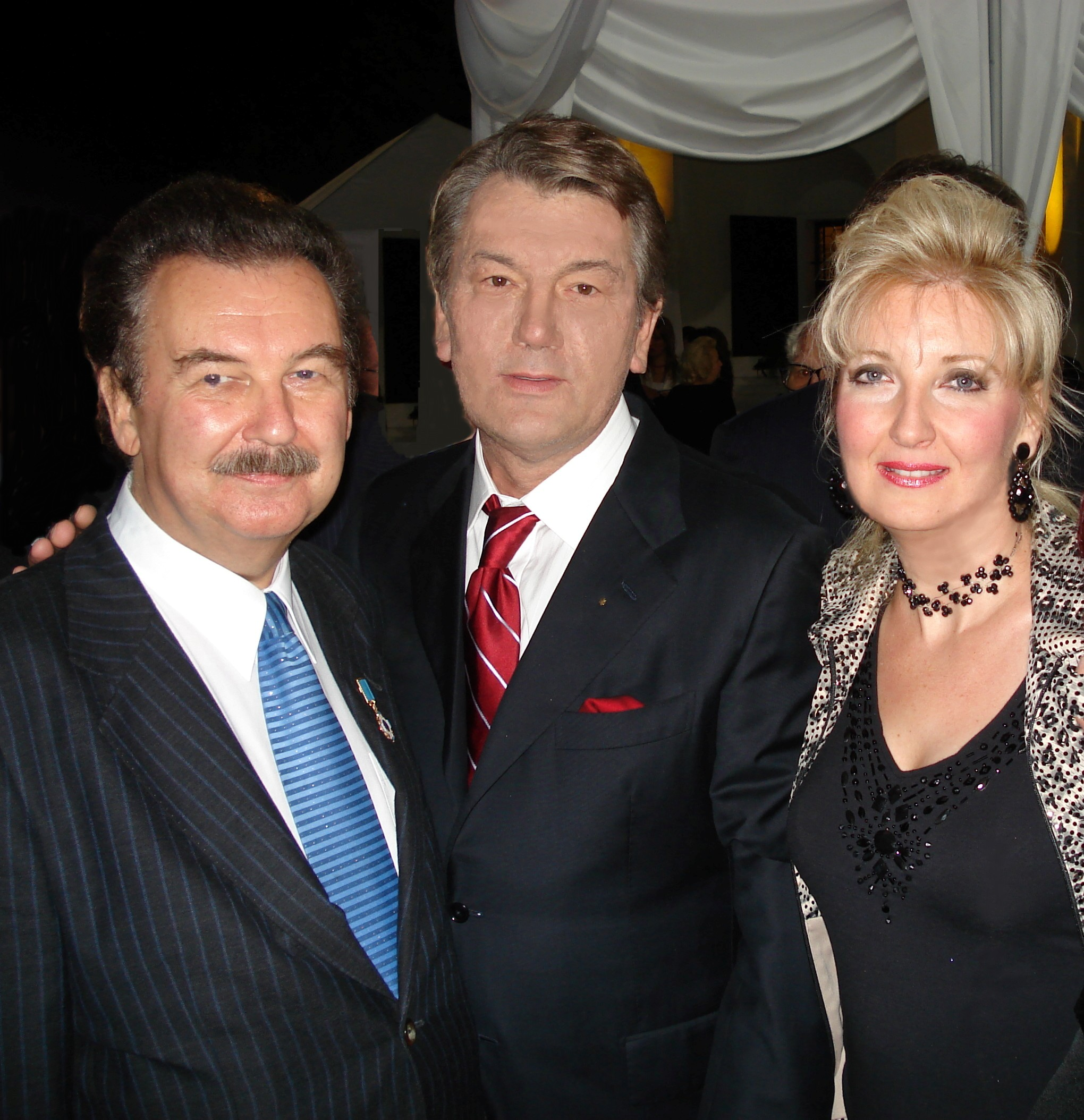
Left to right: Yuri Shymko, with Ukrainian President Viktor Yushchenko, and Yuri's daughter, Lisa Shymko

Yuri Shymko (Ukrainian: Юрій Шимко, born September 6, 1940) is a former politician in Ontario, Canada. He was a Progressive Conservative Party member of the House of Commons of Canada from 1978 to 1979 representing the downtown Toronto riding of Parkdale. From 1981 to 1987, he served in the Legislative Assembly of Ontario representing the riding of High Park-Swansea.

From 2013-2017, Shymko served as President of the International Council in Support of Ukraine (ICSU) which coordinates Ukrainian NGOs in North America, Europe, South America, and Australia.

In 2008, Yuri Shymko received one of Ukraine's highest state honours when President Viktor Yushchenko awarded him the Order of Prince Yaroslav the Wise at a public ceremony in Kyiv.

== Background ==
Shymko was born in Cosel, Province of Silesia, Germany (modern Koźle, part of Kędzierzyn-Koźle, in Poland). He is the grandnephew of the renowned Ukrainian poet and social activist, Ivan Franko, whose granddaughter, Hanna Klyuchko, lived in Canada. Shymko's family moved to Belgium, where he received his early education in a private school operated by the Catholic Redemptorist Fathers. He moved to Canada as a teenager and went to the University of Toronto where he graduated with a degree in modern history and languages. After university he was head of the Modern Languages Department at Victoria Park Secondary School. Having devoted many years to researching the plight of political dissidents in the USSR, Shymko was the editor of "For This Was I Born", a Canadian-published book documenting the violation of human rights in the former Soviet Union.

Shymko is fluent in several languages, including English, French, Ukrainian, and Russian. Yuri Shymko is married to the former Stephanie Kowal. They have two daughters, Lisa Shymko, a political scientist, and Natalie Shymko, an art historian.

From 1973 to 1978, he served as the youngest Secretary-General of the World Congress of Free Ukrainians Ukrainian World Congress and later served as its President from 1988 to 1993.

Shymko is the recipient of a number of Canadian and international awards, including the Outstanding Service Award from the Reena Foundation (1985), which serves the needs of the Jewish community's physically challenged children. In 1997, Shymko's support for the francophonie was recognized when he was officially inducted as an Officer of the Order of La Pléiade by the International Assembly of French Speaking Parliamentarians (1997). Shymko was inducted into the Ordre de la Pléiade together with Canadian astronaut Marc Garneau and Ontario Court of Appeal Justice, Roy McMurtry.

== Politics ==
Shymko ran for the Ontario legislature in the 1971 provincial election, as a candidate for the Ontario Progressive Conservative Party, in the riding of High Park. He was defeated by New Democrat Party incumbent Morton Shulman by 7,281 votes. In the 1975 election, he ran again in the same riding against NDP candidate Ed Ziemba. He was defeated by a margin of 1,773 votes.

In 1978, Shymko was elected to the House of Commons of Canada in a by-election held on October 16, 1978, defeating future cabinet minister Art Eggleton by 1,038 votes in Parkdale. He served for seven months as a member of the official opposition acting as the Human Rights critic. For the 1979 federal election, his riding was redistributed into the newly formed Parkdale—High Park electoral district. On May 22, 1979, following a highly contested race, and an electoral recount, he lost to Liberal Jesse Flis by 74 votes.

With the backing of the Canadian Government, he launched a historic initiative before the United Nations for the peaceful dissolution of the Soviet Union. On November 21, 1978, he presented to the President of the UN General Assembly and its member missions a Memorandum on the Decolonization of the USSR which he coordinated on behalf of the Baltic, Belarusian, and Ukrainian World Congresses.

In the 1981 provincial election, Shymko defeated Ed Ziemba by 2,680 votes. For the next four years, he served in the legislature as a backbench supporter of the Bill Davis and Frank Miller administrations.

Shymko was appointed Parliamentary Assistant to the Minister of Community Services. He also chaired the standing committee on Social Development which published a report on violence against women. He also sponsored several Private Member's Bills. In 1986, through a PMB, he was successful in having Stalin Township in Northern Ontario renamed as Hansen Township in honour of paralympian athlete Rick Hansen.

The Progressive Conservatives were reduced to a minority government in the 1985 election and were defeated in the legislature in June 1985. Shymko retained his seat, defeating NDP candidate Elaine Ziemba by 401 votes. After initially supporting Grossman, he endorsed Alan Pope for the party leadership in late 1985.

He lost to Liberal David Fleet by 814 votes in the 1987 election.

== International experience ==
In 1988, Shymko was appointed by the Government of Canada to serve on the Federal Immigration and Refugee Board (1988–1993).

In August 1991, as president of the Ukrainian World Congress, he urged the Canadian government to recognize the newly independent country of Ukraine. Shymko, who was still a member of the refugee board, was admonished by the board chairman that such lobbying activities placed him in a conflict of interest and were incompatible with his duties as a member of the board. Shymko argued that his participation with the UWC was as an unpaid volunteer and that he had asked to not participate in any refugee claims from the former Soviet Union. Shymko said, "If I'm in contravention of the law, I would have been told a long time ago."

Between 1999 and 2004, Shymko served as an election observer for several Presidential and Parliamentary elections in Ukraine. He is an expert on Ukraine's Crimea region, having been responsible for overseeing the OSCE's Long-term Observer Mission in Crimea during the 2002 parliamentary elections in Ukraine.

In 2007, Shymko was appointed for a three-year term by the Stephen Harper government to the Employment Insurance Board of Referees. In 2010, his appointment was extended until June 26, 2013.

In November 2013, he was elected President of an international coordinating body for NGOs, the International Council in Support of Ukraine (ICSU), which is headquartered in Toronto, Canada.

== Electoral record ==
1971 Ontario general election: High Park
Party	Candidate	Votes	%	±%
New Democratic	Morton Shulman	16,509	54.57	+4.95
Progressive Conservative	Yuri Shymko	9,228	30.50	+5.57
Liberal	Laima Svegeda	4,284	14.16	–11.30
Social Credit	Geza Matrai	230	0.76	–
Total valid votes		30,251		
New Democratic hold		Swing		
Source(s): Canadian Press (October 22, 1971). "Here's who won on the Metro ridings". The Toronto Daily Star. Toronto. p. 12.

Political offices
Preceded by Peter Savaryn	President of the World Congress of Free Ukrainians; 1988–1993	Succeeded by Dmytro Cipywnyk
