= Mary Temple (politician) =

Mary Temple (1903 — December 2, 1995) was an alderman on Toronto City Council in the 1960s at a time when few women were elected officials. She also sat on Metropolitan Toronto Council as a senior alderman for Ward 7 (High Park), and had been chairman of the Toronto Board of Education in the 1950s.

Temple was a school teacher in Saskatchewan before moving to Toronto in 1936, after marrying William Horace Temple, a travelling sweater salesman who would go on to be an Ontario MPP for the Ontario Co-operative Commonwealth Federation in the 1940s and was a temperance crusader in Toronto's west end.
