= William Alexander Baird =

Canadian lawyer and politician

W.A. Baird

Member of Provincial Parliament
- In office 1926–1940
- Preceded by: New riding
- Succeeded by: George Drew
- Constituency: High Park

Personal details
- Born: 10 September 1867 Carlisle, Ontario in Middlesex County
- Died: 30 May 1940 (aged 72) Toronto, Ontario
- Party: Conservative
- Spouse: Annie M. Gilbert
- Occupation: Lawyer

William Alexander Baird (September 10, 1867 – May 30, 1940), commonly referred to as W.A. Baird, was an Ontario lawyer and politician. He represented High Park in the Legislative Assembly of Ontario as a Conservative from 1926 until his death in 1940.

== Background ==
He was born in Carlisle, Ontario in Middlesex County to Protestant parents of Irish ancestry. As a young man he went to Toronto to study law, graduating from Osgoode Hall in 1890. He received his B.C.L. from Trinity College in 1901 and located to Toronto Junction where he worked mostly in property law. Baird married Annie M. Gilbert in 1896, but did not have any children.

== Politics ==
Baird soon became involved in local politics, and successfully ran for mayor of Toronto Junction in 1907, a position in which he was re-elected the following year. He was instrumental in getting the town incorporated as the City of West Toronto in 1908, and was still mayor when the town was annexed by the City of Toronto in 1909, making him the only mayor the City of West Toronto ever had.

Baird remained involved in politics, joining the Toronto City Council as an alderman, a position he held until 1912. Drawing on his experience in property law and his interest in recreation, Baird was instrumental in establishing parkspace in the city, particularly in the Junction area. He helped establish a park at Keele and Humberside streets directly across from his house, a park which was later named in his honour. He was also an inaugural member of the lawn bowling club which remains active on the site. In addition, his efforts also helped establish Beresford Park, a parkette on Gilmour Avenue just north of Annette Street, as well as some tracts in the Davenport area.

Following his departure from city council, Baird remained involved in the West York Conservative Association, and was the main in-party opposition to the incumbent MPP Forbes Godfrey, as the two disagreed on the issue of local option which enabled the ward to impose a ban on alcohol sales. In 1926, Baird was duly put up for the nomination by the Conservatives, and handily won an election as the chief opposition came not from the Liberals, but from the Prohibition Party, who advocated province-wide prohibition. Although a quiet MPP, Baird was re-elected three times before he died in 1940. He seat was subsequently filled in the 1943 election by future-premier George Drew.
