= Downsview =

- Neighbourhood
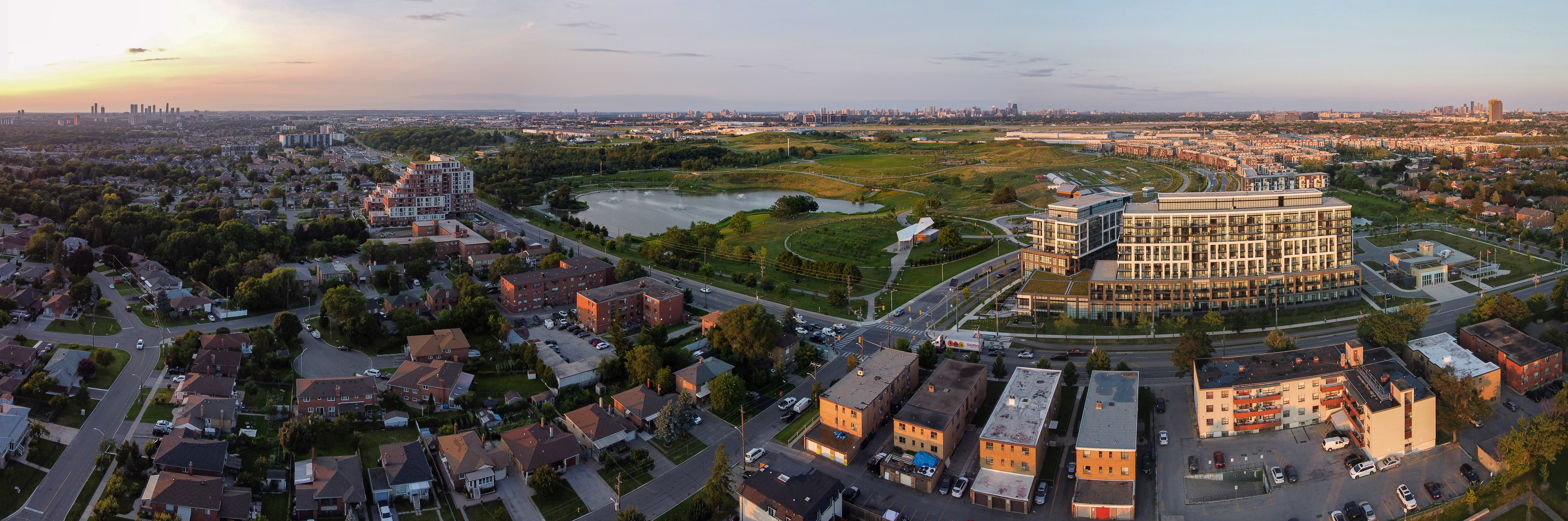
- Aerial view of Downsview in 2024

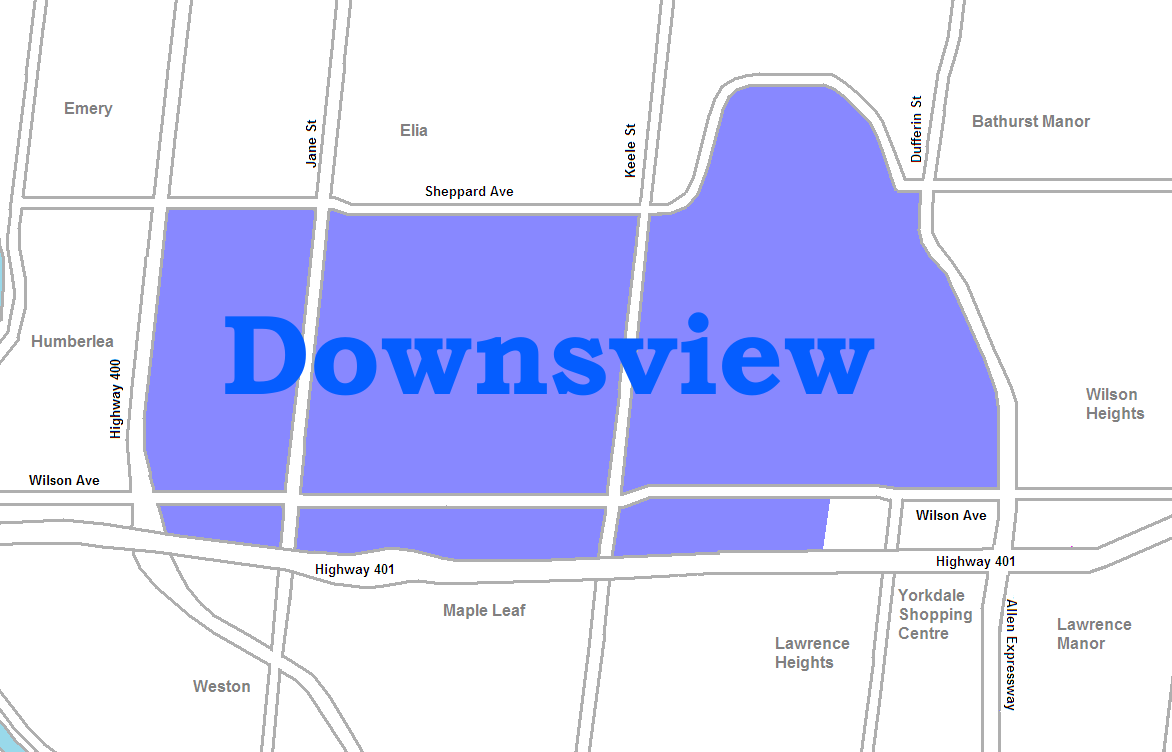

- Location within Toronto
- Coordinates: 43°43′56″N 79°29′36″W
- Country: Canada
- Province: Ontario
- City: Toronto
- Municipality established: 1850 York Township
- Changed municipality: 1922 North York from York Township
- Changed municipality: 1998 Toronto from North York

Government
  - Councillors: Anthony Perruzza; James Pasternak
  - MPPs: Tom Rakocevic (NDP); Michael Kerzner (PC)

Population (2021)
  - Total: 39,385
  - Density: 2,337/km^{2} (6,050/sq mi)
- Time zone: UTC-05:00 (EST)
  - Summer (DST): UTC-04:00 (EDT)
- Area code(s): 416/647

Downsview is a neighbourhood in the north end of Toronto, Ontario, Canada, located in the district of North York. The area takes its name from the Downs View farm established around 1842 near the present-day intersection of Keele Street and Wilson Avenue. It now extends beyond the intersection of Sheppard Avenue and Dufferin Street (the latter which is bypassed by Allen Road in the vicinity of the intersection), though it is popularly seen as including the areas to the north right up to the Toronto city limits at Steeles Avenue. The area includes several large post-World War II subdivisions. Within the area is Downsview Airport, the former site of Canadian Forces Base Downsview, which has since been largely converted following the end of the Cold War into an urban park known as Downsview Park. The airport is still used as a manufacturing and testing facility for Bombardier Aerospace. As of the 2021 census, the Downsview-Roding-CFB neighbourhood was split into the two neighbourhoods of Downsview (east of Roding Street west of Allen Road and between Sheppard Avenue and Highway 401) and Oakdale–Beverley Heights (west of Roding Street east of the CP Rail line just west of Highway 400 also between Sheppard Avenue and Highway 401).

== Description ==
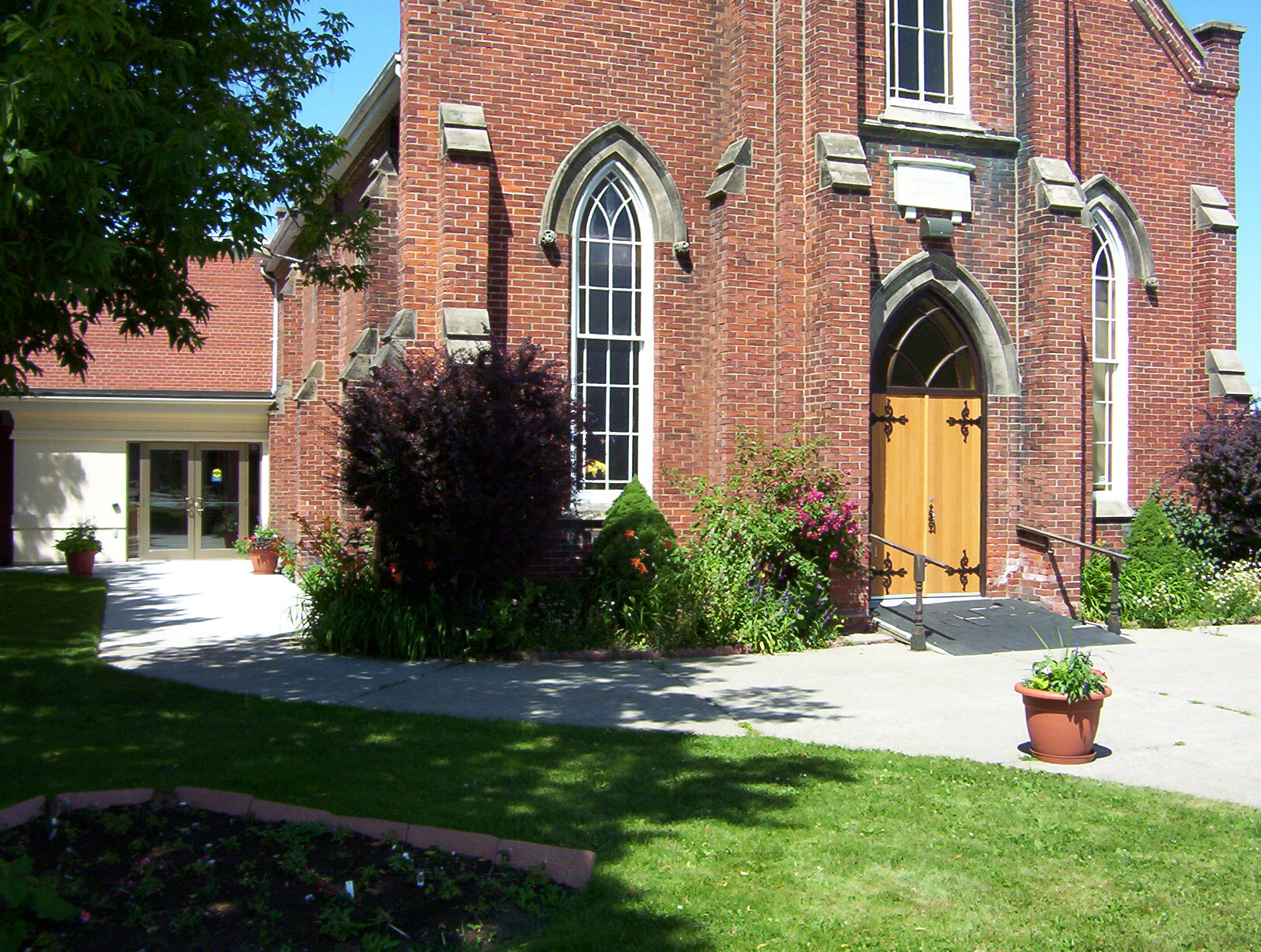
Downsview United Church was erected in the neighbourhood in 1870.

From the east side of Dufferin Street to areas to the east, the area is primarily residential, while to the west, the district is industrial. In the western section is the large Downsview Park district which has served as a military base but is now being redeveloped into parkland and mixed uses. West of Downsview Park, are several residential subdivisions. Most of the houses in Downsview were built immediately post-war and into the 1960s, though some houses and condos have been recently built near Sheppard West station. North of Downsview Park is a large industrial-commercial area.

Immediately beside Dufferin Street, William R. Allen Road brings large traffic volumes from the Ontario Highway 401 exit to the south. The main arterial streets are Sheppard Avenue and Wilson Avenue running east–west and Keele Street and Jane Street running north–south. The major streets have retail businesses along the frontage and the businesses along Wilson Avenue south of Downsview Park have organized the Wilson Village BIA. There is a large "big box" retail area south of Wilson between Dufferin Street and Allen Road.

== History ==
The area is named for the farm settled by Justice of the Peace John Perkins Bull called Downs View in 1842 near Keele Street and Rustic Road, then in York County, Upper Canada. For over a century, the area was an agricultural community with a post office, schoolhouse, and general store. The centre of the community was the Downsview Methodist Church (now Downsview United Church) on Keele Street, which was erected in 1870 and designated a Toronto Heritage Property in 2008. Other historical landmarks from this period include The George Jackson House, which was also designated heritage property. In 1850, the area became part of York Township, and in 1927, became part of North York Township, which eventually became the City of North York. In 1998, the area became part of the city of Toronto.

In April 1929, William De Havilland bought 70 acres (28 ha) of farmland to build a manufacturing facility for De Havilland Canada. The facility was expanded during the 1930s and particularly during the Second World War, and became Canada's largest supplier of military, civilian and government-owned aircraft, as well as the site of several aviation firsts and record-breaking flights. In the early Cold War period, the Royal Canadian Air Force (RCAF) built up the area as a major air station and logistics support base. In 1954, the RCAF built a large supply depot that served as the central stores for the RCAF. The building contains the Downsview Park Merchant's Market, an ongoing concern since 2005, which only operates on weekends during the day. Billed as "Ontario's largest flea market" the 162,000 square foot facility includes a farmer's market, a multi-ethnic food court and a large variety of discount goods and services.

In the 1950s, the Ontario provincial government developed the Downsview Complex, which currently houses a number of provincial offices, as well as a detachment from the Ontario Provincial Police. In 1969, a large residential complex of five 19-storey high apartment buildings, known as Jane-Exbury Towers, was completed in 1969. Designed by architect Uno Prii, they are noted for their mid-century expressionist features.

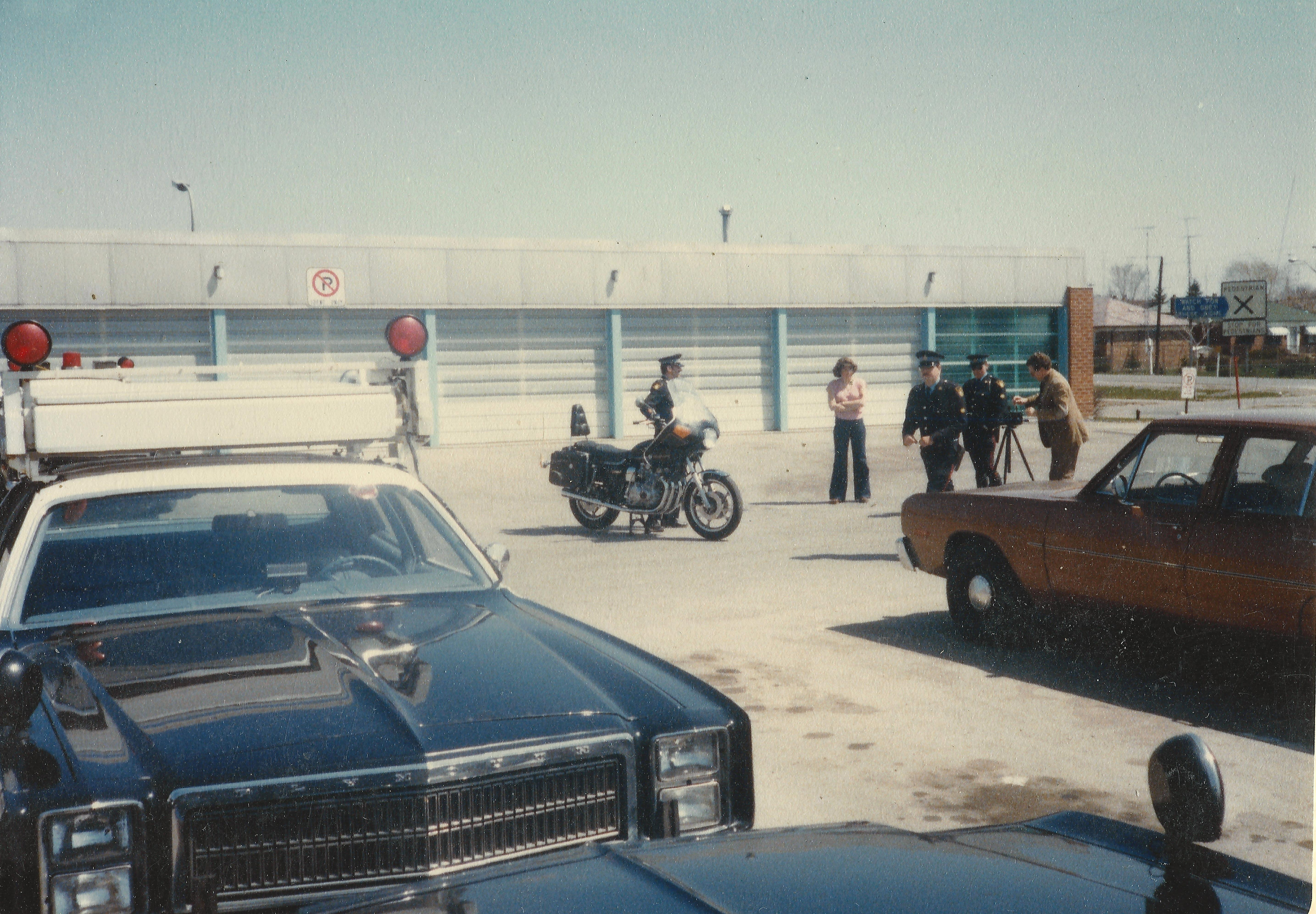
The Ontario Provincial Police's garage depot in Downsview, 1979

The military base and the de Havilland company, including the runway and all buildings, was closed and sold to Bombardier Aerospace in 1994. Bombardier has been manufacturing and testing commercial aircraft on the site since then. Some 1000 de Havilland DH 98 Mosquito aircraft were built by the company at Downsview during the Second World War.

On August 10, 2008, just before 4 a.m., massive explosions occurred at the Sunrise Propane Industrial Gases propane facility, at 54 Murray Rd., located immediately north-east of the intersection of Keele Street and Wilson Avenue. An employee of the facility and a firefighter were killed as a result of the explosions. Mayor David Miller had publicly expressed his condolences to the families of the victims shortly thereafter.

Redevelopment of the Downsview Complex began in 2011. The redevelopment of the complex saw the completion of the Humber River Hospital, which opened in 2015. The acute care hospital is situated on Wilson Avenue and Keele Street.

== Demographics ==
Total population (2021): 39,385

Downsview
17,970
Oakdale–Beverley Heights
21,415

Major ethnic populations, Downsview (2021):

- 44.5% White; 22.3% Italian, 4.5% Portuguese
- 19.3% Filipino
- 8.8% Black; 2.3% Jamaican
- 6.9% Latin American (of any race)
- 5.0% South Asian
- 2.8% East Indian

Major ethnic populations, Oakdale–Beverley Heights (2021):

- 30.7% White; 15.8% Italian, 4.9% Portuguese
- 26.4% Black; 5.8% Jamaican
- 12.1% Filipino
- 11.7% Latin American (of any race)
- 3.4% South Asian
- 2.3% East Indian

Total population (2016): 35,052

Major ethnic populations (2016):

- 42.6% White; 23.4% Italian, 5.2% Portuguese
- 15.5% Black; 6.7% Jamaican
- 13.7% Filipino
- 10.3% Latin American (of any race)
- 3.9% South Asian
- 3.6% East Indian

Total population (2011): 34,659

Major ethnic populations (2011):

- 47.0% White; 26.3% Italian
- 17.3% Black; 7.6% Jamaican
- 9.2% Filipino
- 8.8% Latin American (of any race)
- 4.3% South Asian

Total population (2006): 31,960

Major ethnic populations (2006):

- 51.6% White; 30.6% Italian
- 14.4% Black; 5.6% Jamaican
- 10.2% Latin American (of any race)
- 7.0% South Asian
- 5.4% Filipino
- 5.3% East Indian

Total population (2001): 34,220

Major ethnic populations (2001):

- 55.5% White; 28.7% Italian
- 13.4% Black; 7.0% Jamaican
- 9.7% Latin American (of any race)
- 5.6% South Asian
- 4.7% East Indian
- 3.4% Filipino

== Education ==
Two public school boards operate schools in Downsview, the separate Toronto Catholic District School Board (TCDSB), and the secular Toronto District School Board (TDSB). Both school boards also operate a public secondary schools in the neighbourhood. TCDSB operates Madonna Catholic Secondary School, an all-girls secondary school, whereas TDSB operates Downsview Secondary School. TCDSB and TDSB also operate several public institutions in Downsview that offer primary education. They include:

- Ancaster Public School (TDSB)
- Beverley Heights Middle School (TDSB)
- Blaydon Public School (TDSB)
- Calico Public School (TDSB)
- Chalkfarm Public School (TDSB)
- Downsview Public School (TDSB)
- Highview Public School (TDSB)
- Pierre Laporte Middle School (TDSB)
- St. Andre Catholic School (TCDSB)
- St. Conrad Catholic School (TCDSB)
- St. Martha Catholic School (TCDSB)
- St. Norbert Catholic School (TCDSB)
- St. Raphael Catholic School (TCDSB)
- Tumpane Public School (TDSB)

The French first language public secular school board, Conseil scolaire Viamonde, and its separate counterpart, Conseil scolaire catholique MonAvenir also offer schooling to applicable residents of Downsview, although they do not operate a school in the neighbourhood. CSCM and CSV students attend schools situated in other neighbourhoods in Toronto.

The neighbourhood is also home to Centennial College's Downsview Aerospace campus. The college is a post-secondary institution, with several campuses throughout Toronto.

== Recreation ==
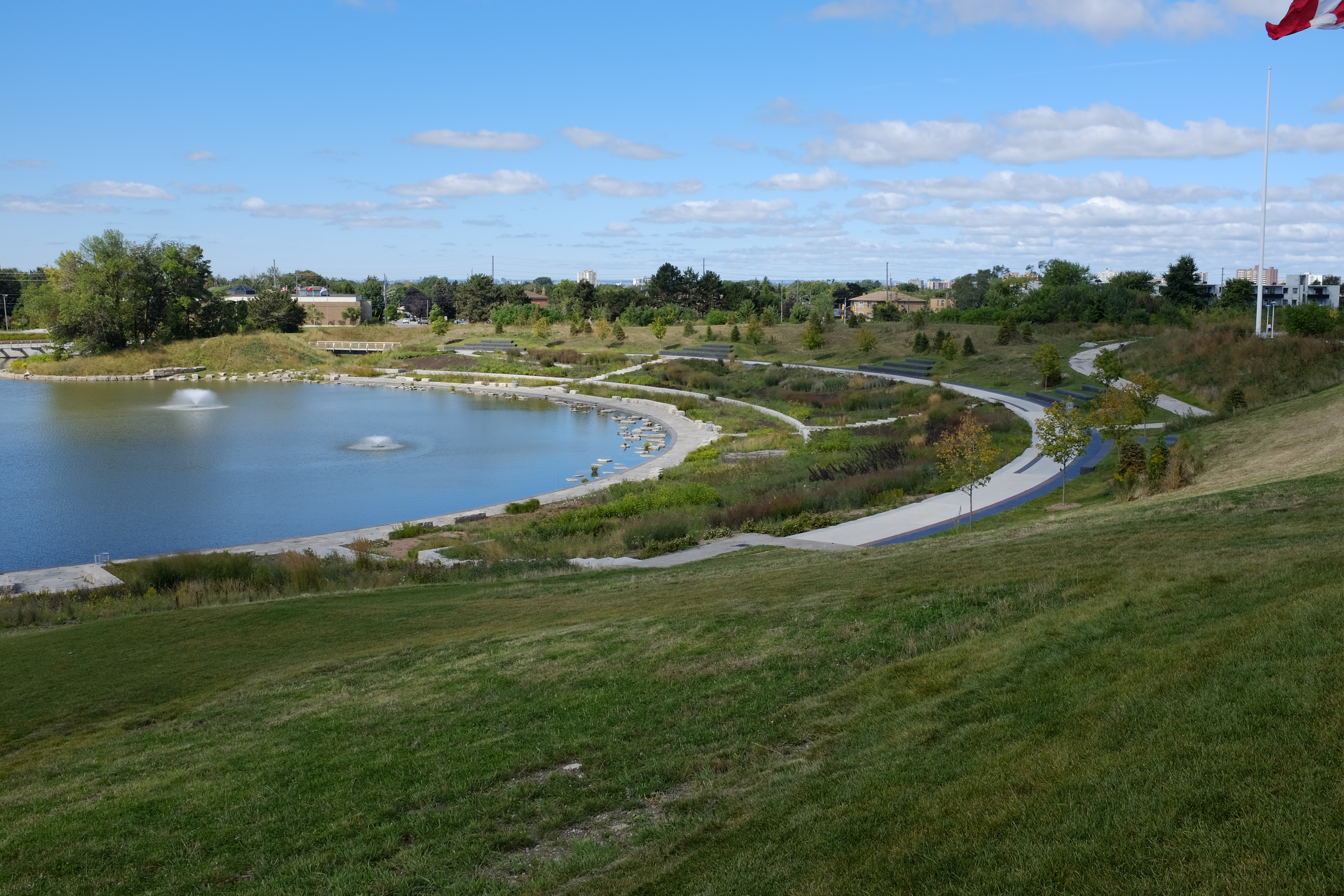
Downsview Park is a large urban park operated by the Government of Canada.

Several municipal parks are situated in Downsview, including Chalkfarm Park, Downsview Dells Park, Oakdale Village Park, and Roding Park. Roding Park is an 8 ha (20 acres) park near Wilson Avenue and Keele Street. Recreational facilities in the park include a baseball diamond, two tennis courts, four bocce courts and a children's playground. Downsview Dells Park is a large 75 ha (190 acres) park which features wilderness and wetland settings with picnic areas and fire pits. Car parking and washrooms are available within the park. Within the park is Downsview Dells House, a municipal drug and alcohol treatment facility. A number of these parks are situated near the valley of the Black Creek, as it flows south and west from Sheppard Avenue midway between Keele and Jane Streets. The valley forms a part of the larger Toronto ravine system.

Municipal parks in Downsview are maintained by the Toronto Parks, Forestry and Recreation Division. In addition to parks, the division also operates several community centres in the neighbourhood, including Ancaster Community Centre, Chalkfarm Community Centre, and Roding Community Centre. The Toronto Public Library operates two branches in the neighbourhood, Black Creek branch, and Downsview branch.

The Government of Canada also maintains an urban park in the neighbourhood, known as Downsview Park. The park was formerly used by the Canadian Armed Forces, as CFB Toronto. The park houses several recreational facilities, including practice facilities for the Toronto FC. Downsview Park has also hosted several large public events, including a Papal Mass, attended by 800,000 people on 28 July 2002. The mass was led by Pope John Paul II for World Youth Day. On 30 July 2003, the park also hosted a massive concert known as Molson Canadian Rocks for Toronto. The concert was held in support of the City of Toronto after the 2003 SARS outbreak there.

== Transportation ==
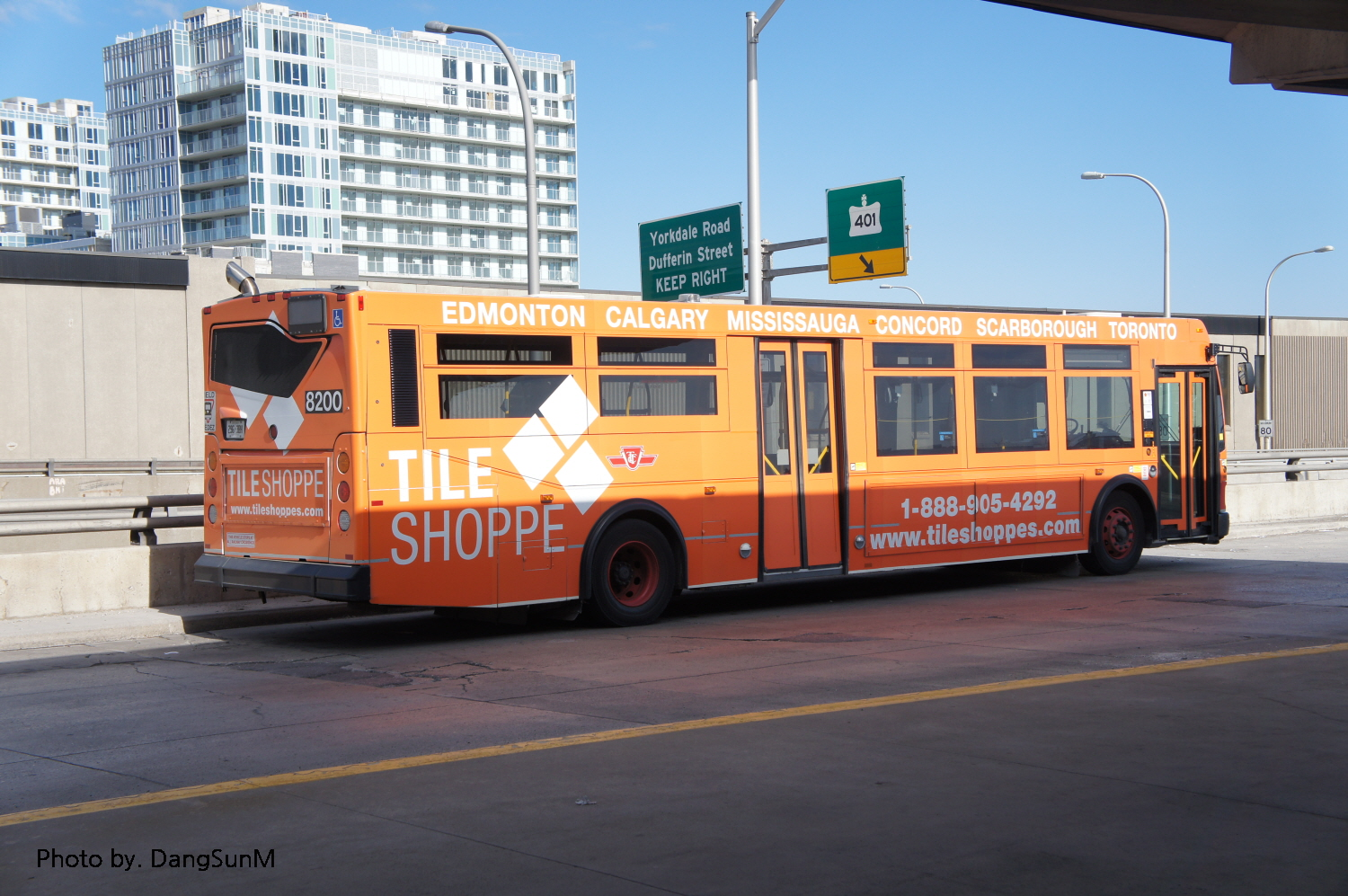
A bus operated by the Toronto Transit Commission leaves Wilson subway station in Downsview.

Several major roadways serve as the boundary for Downsview, with Sheppard Avenue to the north, Allen Road to the east, Highway 401 to the south, and Highway 400 to the west. The latter two roadways are major controlled access highways that form a part of the province's 400-series highways network. Portions of Allen Road adjacent to Downsview also operate as a controlled access highway, although it is maintained by the City of Toronto, and not the provincial government. Other major thoroughfares in the neighbourhood include Keele Street, a major north–south roadway that runs through Downsview.

Public transportation in Downsview is provided by the Toronto Transit Commission (TTC). The TTC operates several bus routes through the neighbourhood, as well as the Toronto subway. Line 1 of the subway system has two stops in the neighbourhood, Wilson station and Downsview Park station. Another stop on Line 1, Sheppard West station, is situated adjacent of the neighbourhood, on the eastern side of Allen Road. Regional train service by GO Transit stops at the Downsview Park Station.
