= Morton Shulman =

Canadian politician, physician, businessman, and broadcaster (1925–2000)

Morton Shulman OC
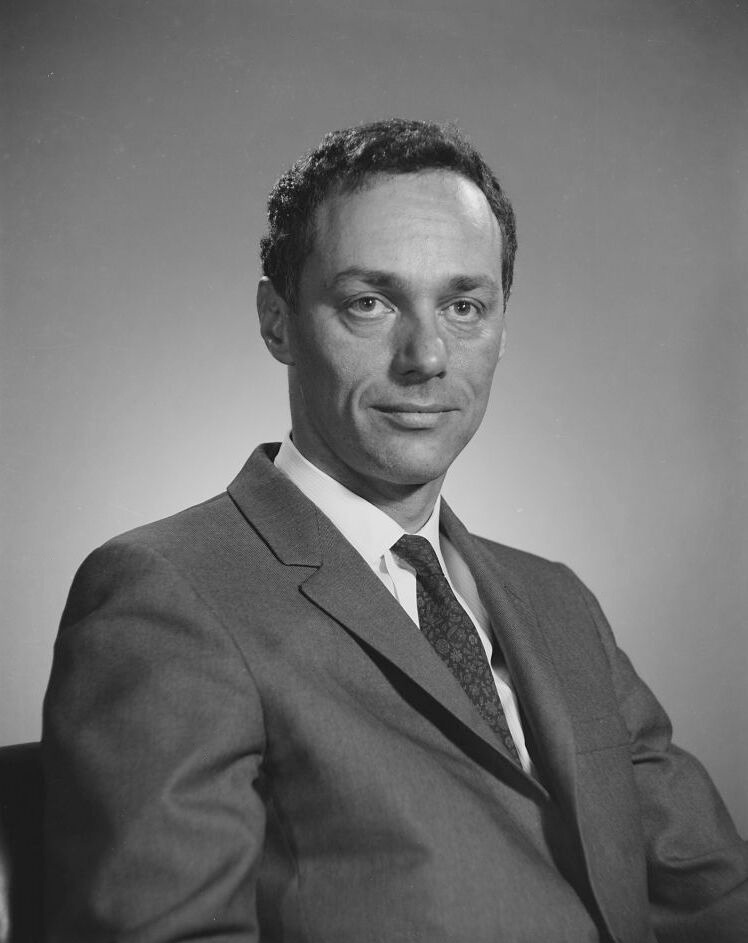
- Morton, c. 1968

Member of Provincial Parliament
- In office 1967–1975
- Preceded by: Alfred Hozack Cowling
- Succeeded by: Riding abolished
- Constituency: High Park

Personal details
- Born: 25 April 1925 Toronto, Ontario, Canada
- Died: 18 August 2000 (aged 75) Toronto, Ontario, Canada
- Party: New Democratic
- Other political affiliations: Progressive Conservative (until 1967)
- Spouse: Gloria Bossin
- Children: Dianne Saxe; D. Geoffrey Shulman
- Relatives: Rebecca Saxe (granddaughter)
- Education: University of Toronto
- Occupation: Medical doctor; businessman; politician; broadcaster

Morton Shulman OC (25 April 1925 – 18 August 2000) was a Canadian politician, businessman, broadcaster, columnist, coroner, and physician. He first came to public notice as Ontario's Chief Coroner in the early 1960s. At the same time he became a very successful stock-market player and wrote a bestselling book on investing in the stock market. In the mid-1960s he embarrassed the provincial government when he found it to be disobeying provincial health and safety laws. He was fired and then ran for the Legislative Assembly of Ontario, defeating a government Member of Provincial Parliament (MPP). He served two terms as the MPP for High Park from 1967 to 1975. In the late 1970s and 1980s he hosted a nationally distributed television talk show called The Shulman File. He was diagnosed with Parkinson's disease in the early 1980s and became a pharmaceutical entrepreneur specializing in treatments for that disease. Near the end of his life he was appointed to the Order of Canada, the country's highest civilian award.

== Biography ==
Morton Shulman was born on 25 April 1925 to a Jewish family in Toronto, Ontario, where he grew up and was educated. He received his Doctor of Medicine from the University of Toronto in 1948 and maintained a general practice on Roncesvalles Avenue in Toronto. He became wealthy through investing in the stock market and wrote a bestselling book, Anyone Can Make a Million in 1966. He was married to Gloria Shulman (née Bossin) and they had two children: environmental lawyer and Toronto city councillor Dianne Saxe; and Dr. Geoffrey Shulman (1954-2012).

=== Coroner ===
Shulman was appointed to the Coroner's Office as a junior in 1952, in exchange for his helping Conservative candidate William James Stewart defeat incumbent CCF MPP Lloyd Fell in Parkdale in the 1951 election, . In 1961 he was appointed Ontario's chief coroner, and in 1963 he was named Chief Coroner of the Municipality of Metropolitan Toronto. Shulman was outspoken and used his position as coroner to crusade on a number of issues such as enacting tougher regulations on lifejackets for small boats, having government regulate car safety, introducing breathalysers and loosening abortion laws after he investigated the deaths of women who had died while trying to terminate their pregnancies. He also campaigned to force surgeons to count instruments before and after surgery, and construction companies to provide better bracing in trenches. His service as a coroner became the inspiration for the Canadian television drama Wojeck.

In 1967, Shulman embarrassed the Progressive Conservative provincial government by revealing its inaction in enforcing the fire code in a recently built hospital. As a result he was fired as Metropolitan Toronto's Chief Coroner.

=== Political career ===
Shulman decided to avenge himself on the Ontario government by running for a seat in the Legislative Assembly of Ontario. Despite ideological differences, he decided to run for the Ontario New Democratic Party (NDP) in the High Park electoral district, where his medical clinic was located. He joined the social democratic party because it gave him a free hand in choosing where to run, and because its views on public safety were compatible with his. He was elected in the that year's election, defeating High Park's incumbent MPP, Progressive Conservative Alfred Cowling by over 6,200 votes.

Shulman used his position in the legislature to become a thorn in the side of the Tory government. He asked provocative questions in the legislature and was known for stunts such as selling the book The Happy Hooker from his office after it had been banned by the Toronto Police morality squad (he offered MPPs a ten percent discount). Once, to make a point about lax security, he carried a pellet gun — dressed up to look like a submachine gun — in a bag through an Ontario nuclear plant, and later pulled it out on the floor of the Legislature; he waved it around gleefully while cabinet ministers hid under their desks. In 1975, shortly before the next general election, Shulman demanded that he be appointed Attorney General in the event that the NDP won. NDP leader Stephen Lewis refused to commit to such a promise. After clashing with Lewis and his other colleagues in the NDP, Shulman retired from the legislature. He later wrote a memoir of his political career entitled Member of the Legislature.

=== The Shulman File ===
After leaving politics, Shulman started a broadcasting career. From 1977 to 1983 he hosted The Shulman File, a television talk show on CITY-TV which featured confrontational interviews, sensationalist and risqué topics and outrageous opinions. The show was spoofed by SCTV as Murray's File. At the same time, he began writing a regular column in the Toronto Sun which continued into the 1990s. He also became involved in finance, heading a mutual fund and pursuing various business interests.

=== Deprenyl ===
Shulman was diagnosed with Parkinson's disease in 1983, and formed a company, Deprenyl Research Ltd. (which became Draxis Health Inc.), in order to acquire Canadian rights to the anti-Parkinson's drug Deprenyl. His company engaged in a long fight with the federal government for approval of the drug for sale in Canada. He also started a second pharmaceutical company, called DUSA, later run by his son.

=== Honours and death ===
In 1993, Shulman was awarded the Order of Canada, and was invested as an Officer of the Order on January 6, 1994. After battling Parkinson's disease for more than 17 years, he died from complications arising from it at the Baycrest Centre for Geriatric Care in Toronto on August 18, 2000. He was buried in Pardes Shalom Cemetery on Dufferin Street two days later. In 2013, a street leading to Ontario's new forensic services and coroner's complex, in Toronto's North York area, was named Morton Shulman Avenue.

== Electoral record ==
1971 Ontario general election: High Park
Party	Candidate	Votes	%	±%
New Democratic	Morton Shulman	16,509	54.57	+4.95
Progressive Conservative	Yuri Shymko	9,228	30.50	+5.57
Liberal	Laima Svegeda	4,284	14.16	–11.30
Social Credit	Geza Matrai	230	0.76	–
Total valid votes		30,251		
New Democratic hold		Swing		
Source(s): Canadian Press (22 October 1971). "Here's who won on the Metro ridings". The Toronto Daily Star. Toronto. p. 12.

1967 Ontario general election: High Park
Party	Candidate	Votes	%	±%
New Democratic	Morton Shulman	12,888	49.62	+30.60
Liberal	Paul Staniszewski	6,614	25.46	–12.09
Progressive Conservative	Alfred Cowling	6,475	24.93	–17.86
Total valid votes		25,977		
New Democratic gain		Swing		
Source(s): Canadian Press (18 October 1967). "Provincial election results in Metro ridings". The Toronto Daily Star. Toronto. p. 66.

== See also ==
- Larry Campbell (Canadian coroner and politician compared to Morton Shulman)
- Quincy, M.E. (U.S. TV series inspired in part by the career of Morton Shulman)
- Wojeck (Canadian TV series inspired in part by the career of Morton Shulman)

== Bibliography ==
- Shulman, Morton (1975). Coroner. Toronto: Fitzhenry & Whiteside. ISBN 978-1-55005-167-4.
