= Bill Boytchuk =

Toronto City Councillor for Ward 1 (Swansea and Bloor West Village)
- In office 1969–1976
- Preceded by: Mary Temple
- Succeeded by: David White
- In office 1978–1994
- Preceded by: Elizabeth Eayrs
- Succeeded by: David Hutcheon

Personal details
- Born: April 27, 1922; Sniatyn, Stanisławów Voivodeship, Second Polish Republic
- Died: January 22, 1998 (aged 75); Toronto, Ontario
- Occupation: Pharmacist

William Boytchuk (April 27, 1922 – January 22, 1998) was a longtime city councillor in Toronto, Ontario.

He was born near Sniatyn, Poland and after spending several years in Germany immigrated to Canada in 1948. Working as a pharmacist he became active in the local Ukrainian committee.

Boytchuk was elected to city council in the 1969 election representing the westernmost part of the Old City of Toronto covering Swansea and Bloor West Village. He was considered one of the council's "Old Guard" of conservative, generally pro-development councillors but became more moderate over his time in office. During the Cold War he was also notable for his strong anti-Soviet policies. He played a central role in having a monument to the Katyn Massacre erected in his ward. In 1990 he also led the effort to oppose a sister city agreement with Volgograd.

In the 1976 election Boytchuk lost his seat in a surprise upset to left winger David White. He thus decided to run provincially for the Progressive Conservatives in the 1977 Ontario election for the riding of High Park—Swansea. He lost that race in a close contest to NDP incumbent Ed Ziemba. With the retirement of Elizabeth Eayrs, the other councillor in his old seat, Boytchuk returned to council in 1978. He continued to represent his west end seat until he retired in 1994.

In 1964, he served as the president of the National Soccer League until the 1968 season.
