= Jackson House (Fayetteville, Arkansas) =

Historic house in Arkansas, United States

- U.S. National Register of Historic Places
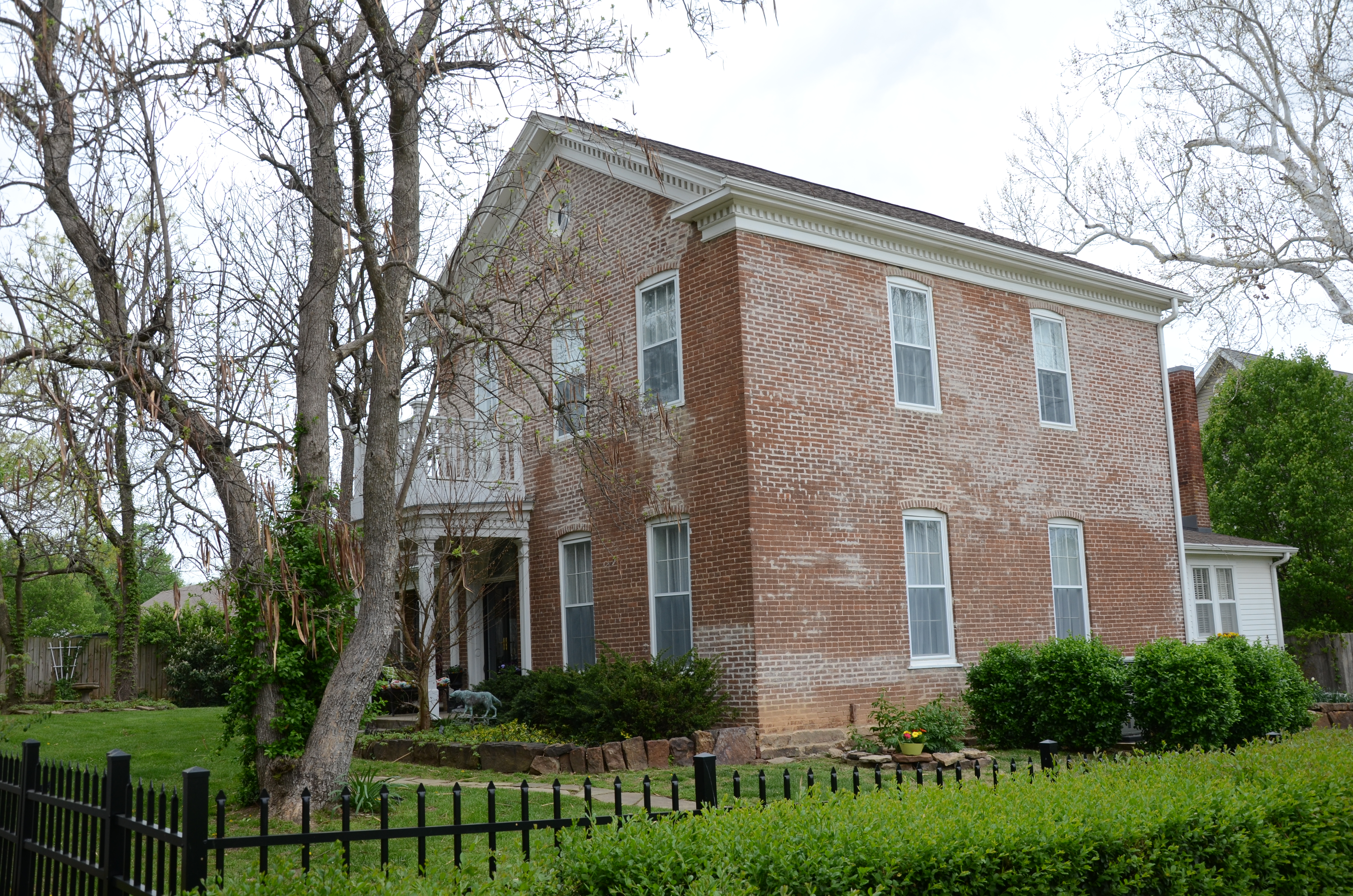

- Location within Arkansas Location within the United States
- Location: 1617 North Jordan Lane, Fayetteville, Arkansas
- Coordinates: 36°4′57″N 94°8′34″W
- Area: 2.8 acres (1.1 ha)
- Built: 1866
- NRHP reference No.: 82002149
- Added to NRHP: August 17, 1982

The Jackson House is a historic house at 1617 North Jordan Lane in Fayetteville, Arkansas. It is a 2 1/2-story L-shaped brick building, three bays wide, with a cross gable roof and a single-story ell extending to the north. A single-story portico shelters the main entrance of the south-facing facade, supported by two square columns, with a balustrade above. A small round window is located in the gable end of the main facade. The east elevation (which faces the street, has two segmented-arch windows on each level. The house was built in 1866 by Columbus Jackson, whose family lineage is said to include President Andrew Jackson.

When the property was listed on the National Register of Historic Places in 1982, the property included more than 20 acres (8.1 ha) of farmland as an integral part of the listing, as well as a number of outbuildings and the archaeological remains of a slave quarters. The property has now been subdivided, and the house stands in a modern subdivision.

== See also ==
- National Register of Historic Places listings in Washington County, Arkansas
