= William Horace Temple =

Canadian military aviator, politician and temperance activist (1898–1988)

William H. Temple
- Temple at his campaign victory party in 1948

Member of Provincial Parliament
- In office 1948–1951
- Preceded by: George Drew
- Succeeded by: Alfred Hozack Cowling
- Constituency: High Park

Personal details
- Born: 28 November 1898 Montreal, Quebec, Canada
- Died: 9 April 1988 (aged 89) Toronto, Ontario, Canada
- Party: Co-operative Commonwealth Federation/New Democratic Party
- Spouse: Mary Temple
- Children: 2
- Occupation: Businessman
- Nickname: Temperance Bill

Military service
- Allegiance: Canada
- Branch/service: Royal Canadian Air Force
- Years of service: 1942–1945
- Rank: Flying Officer
- Battles/wars: Battle of the Atlantic
- War: World War II
- Allegiance: Britain
- Branch: Royal Naval Air Service
- Service Years: 1916–1918
- Rank: Flying Officer

William Horace (Bill) Temple (28 November 1898 – 9 April 1988), nicknamed "Temperance Bill" or "Temperance Willie", was a Canadian socialist politician, trade union activist, businessman and temperance crusader. As a youth he worked for the railway. During World War I, and World War II he served in the Royal Naval Air Service and later on the Royal Canadian Air Force. Between the wars, he was a salesman, and then he started a clothing import business. He became a socialist during that period and joined the Co-operative Commonwealth Federation (CCF) when it was formed. He ran for political office many times for the CCF, both federally and provincially. The highlight of his political career was in 1948, when he defeated the incumbent Ontario Premier George Drew in his own legislative seat, in the electoral district of High Park, even though Drew's party won the general election with a majority government. His tenure was relatively short, serving only one term, and was defeated in the 1951 provincial election, and went back into the clothing import business. In his later years, he successfully led the political fight to maintain the prohibition on selling alcohol in a section of Toronto's west end and won three referendums in the 1960s, 1970s, and 1980s. He died in the spring of 1988, a few months before another referendum on lifting the restrictions on alcohol in the area was again defeated, his "last" victory.

== Early life ==
Temple was born in Montreal on 28 November 1898, and was one of five children. His father was a railway conductor, and the family moved with him to Toronto in 1909. After completing grade 8, due in part to his father's alcoholism, he took a job as an office boy with the Grand Trunk Railway for $5 a week.

== Military career ==
At the age of 17 Temple went to fight in World War I, joining the Royal Navy Air Service as a fighter pilot before transferring to the Royal Air Force, where he destroyed three Royal Air Force planes and no enemy planes. In 1942, during World War II, he was a flying officer on intelligence operations for the Royal Canadian Air Force stationed in Sydney, Nova Scotia and Gander, Newfoundland.

== Young adulthood ==
After World War I, Temple was treated as a war hero by his employer. The Arrow Shirt Company president met Temple's train in Montreal, where he promoted him to travelling salesman for the company's Winnipeg office.

It was in Winnipeg where Temple – who had been a staunch Conservative, supporting Prime Ministers Sir Robert Borden and Arthur Meighen – was captivated by the speeches of local socialist clergyman and politician J. S. Woodsworth, and became a socialist in 1921. Temple would regularly encounter Woodsworth, then a member of parliament in Ottawa, on train trips for his sales job. Arrow moved him and his wife Mary Temple to Regina, Saskatchewan where he met Major James Coldwell, who at the time, was the principal at the school that she taught at. Coldwell was the leader of the Independent Labour party (ILP), and Temple would drive him to political rallies and events during this period. Another important socialist figure that he met at this time was Clarence Fines, an assistant principal at Coldwell's school. They would go door-to-door to raise money for the ILP. Fines would later become the finance minister in Tommy Douglas's Saskatchewan government during the 1940s and 1950s. Temple joined the Co-operative Commonwealth Federation (CCF) when it was formed by Woodsworth and his followers in 1932.

== Great Depression ==
When Temple was transferred by Arrow to Kitchener, Ontario in 1933, he became president of the local CCF organization. His employer disapproved of Temple's socialist activism and told him to choose between politics and his job. Temple chose politics, putting himself out of work when the Depression was at its worst. Temple borrowed $5,000 from his sister and went to England, where he obtained samples of cashmere sweaters, Dack slacks and Burberry coats, and returned to Canada to find retail outlets. His import business continued until the war, when he enlisted in the RCAF.

== Political career ==
In 1943, Flying Officer Temple, took leave, to become the Ontario CCF's candidate in the west-end Toronto constituency of High Park in the provincial election. He was narrowly defeated by George Drew, the leader of the Ontario Progressive Conservative Party, by a mere 400 votes. Drew became Premier of Ontario as a result of the election.

Temple ran in the June 1945 federal election as the CCF candidate in High Park. He placed third. Undeterred by his previous electoral defeats, he ran again in the High Park constituency, this time at the provincial level, in the 1948 Ontario election. Temple castigated Drew for softening Ontario's liquor laws and claimed that he was the captive of "liquor interests" because of the government's decision to allow liquor sales in cocktail bars. While Drew's party swept to victory across the province, Drew himself was defeated by Temple and decided to resign as premier and to move to federal politics.

After being elected, Temple continued to hound Drew. In the fall of 1948, Drew become the leader of the federal Progressive Conservatives. He needed a seat in the federal parliament and contested a by-election in the Ottawa-area electoral district of Carleton to win a seat in the House of Commons. The federal Co-operative Commonwealth Federation (CCF) was determined to defeat him and so it ran Eugene Forsey as its candidate. Temple was brought up from Toronto to appear at a political meeting in Richmond, Ontario's Town Hall, where Forsey and Drew were speaking. He accused the Tory leader of being "a tool of the liquor interests" and also made suggestions about Drew's sobriety. Throughout the evening, Drew grew more red-faced and explosive every time Temple spoke. Finally, after Drew misheard Temple calling him dishonest, the two men were restrained before they could come to physical blows with each other. A riot was barely averted, and the meeting had to be terminated. However, on 20 December 1948, Drew soundly defeated Forsey and went on to sit in Parliament.

As a Member of Provincial Parliament (MPP), Temple fought for temperance and for housing for World War II veterans. He was elected CCF Caucus chairman shortly after he had defeated Drew. His temperance crusades in the legislature put him at odds with the party establishment, including national secretary, David Lewis. The following year, he was not re-elected Caucus Chairman. Temple remained in the Ontario legislature until his defeat in the 1951 election. After his defeat, he returned to the clothing import business until his retirement in the late 1960s.

Temple remained an activist in the CCF. In the early 1950s, he was a leader of the "Ginger Group", a group of dissident CCFers who argued that the party's poor performance in the 1951 provincial election was due to the party moving away from taking clear socialist stands on issues and instead focussing too much on organizational issues. The group opposed what it saw as the "bureaucratization" of the CCF with salaried organizers and a greater emphasis on fundraising taking the place of grassroots volunteers and political education and discussion. Temple and his supporters also argued that power was being increasingly concentrated in the hands of the party executive instead of the grassroots, which resulted in the squelching of democratic discussion and grassroots policy development and sought to rectify this by curtailing the powers of the provincial secretary.

On 12 April 1952, at the 18th annual provincial convention, Temple nearly ran for leader against Ted Jolliffe but withdrew at the last minute and allowed Jolliffe to be acclaimed. Temple then ran for party president against the establishment candidate, Ted Isley, but was defeated 112 to 85. Temple and one other member of the Ginger Group, True Davidson, were then subsequently elected to the executive as vice-presidents.

He remained a member of the CCF's successor, the Ontario New Democratic Party, for much of his life but resigned from the NDP in 1987. He stated that he "cannot possibly accept the liquor policy of the party."

== Temperance crusader ==
He acquired the nickname "Temperance Willie" while he served in the RCAF. His anti-liquor attitudes formed in his early years as a result of his father's alcoholism as well as his Methodist upbringing and experiences in the military. He admitted to having a few drinks during World War I: "Of course I've had a drink, you cannot go through two world wars without taking a drink," he told the Globe and Mail, but he added, "I think I had a few on Nov. 11, 1918, but I don't really remember having any since."

After his political defeat, he remained active in West Toronto, where he founded the Inter-Church Temperance League. When the community joined the city of Toronto in 1909, it did so on condition of remaining a "dry" district in which alcohol sales were prohibited, as they had been since 1904. Temple and his Temperance League fought for half a century to maintain that regulation despite attempts by the city to reverse it. Over the years, several plebiscites were held on allowing alcohol sales, and Temple and his supporters successfully fought against permitting alcohol sales in referendums held in 1966, 1972, 1984. He died several months before a 1988 plebiscite, but he had already begun the campaign, and his supporters credited him with their victory. It was not until after Temple's death that neighbourhoods in the area finally voted to allow alcohol sales, beginning in 1994 in the St. Clair West area and ending in The Junction in 2000, the last dry region in West Toronto that became wet.

== Trade unionism ==
Temple was also a supporter of trade union rights throughout his life, and walked on countless picket lines. In the fall of 1973, during a strike by the independent Canadian Textile and Chemical Union at Artistic Woodworking in North York, while on the picket line, he was arrested and charged with assaulting a police officer. When Temple's case was brought to trial, the officer who had allegedly been assaulted (who was twice Temple's size and more than half his age) claimed in testimony that he had smelled alcohol on Temple's breath. That caused more offence to Temple than the claim that he had committed an assault, and a long series of character witnesses testified that Temple had never consumed anything stronger than ginger ale as long as they had known him. The charges were dismissed.

== Religion ==
Temple was raised a Methodist and was a member of the United Church of Canada, where he attended every Sunday, although in the latter years of his life he said his religious views were probably closer to the Unitarian Church.

== Personal life ==
Temple was predeceased by his son, William Price Temple; who was hospitalized for over four months, in and out of a coma, and finally succumbed to an undiagnosed brain disease on 21 August 1956. His wife, Mary Temple, served for a period as an alderman on the Toronto City Council for Ward 7 from 1959 to 1969, and had served as a school trustee for the ward. She also served as Chair of the Toronto School Board in the 1950s.

Temple died on 9 April 1988, at the Queensway General Hospital, after a short illness at the age of 89.

== Sources ==
- Azoulay, Dan (1997). Keeping the Dream Alive: The Survival of the Ontario CCF/NDP, 1950-1963. Montreal: McGill-Queen's University Press. ISBN 0-7735-1634-4.
- Caplan, Gerald (1973). The Dilemma of Canadian Socialism: The CCF in Ontario. Toronto: McClelland and Stewart. ISBN 0-7710-1896-7.
- Forsey, Eugene (1990). A Life on the fringe: the memoirs of Eugene Forsey. Toronto: Oxford University Press. ISBN 0-19-540720-2.
- Hansard Reporting and Interpretation Services (11 April 1988). "William h. temple". Hansard. Legislative Assembly of Ontario.
- Hansard Reporting and Interpretation Services (19 May 2010). "MPP William Horace Temple". Past & Present MPPs. Legislative Assembly of Ontario.
- MacDonald, Donald C. (1998). The Happy Warrior: Political Memoirs, 2nd Ed. Toronto: Dundurn Press. pp. 292–296. ISBN 1-55002-307-1.
- Melnyk, Olenka (1989). No Bankers in Heaven. Toronto: McGraw-Hill Ryerson. ISBN 0-07-549810-3.
- Morley, John Terence (1984). Secular Socialists: The CCF/NDP in Ontario, A Biography. Montreal: McGill-Queen's University Press. ISBN 0-7735-0390-0.
