= Orville Jackson House =

Historic building in Idaho, USA

- U.S. National Register of Historic Places
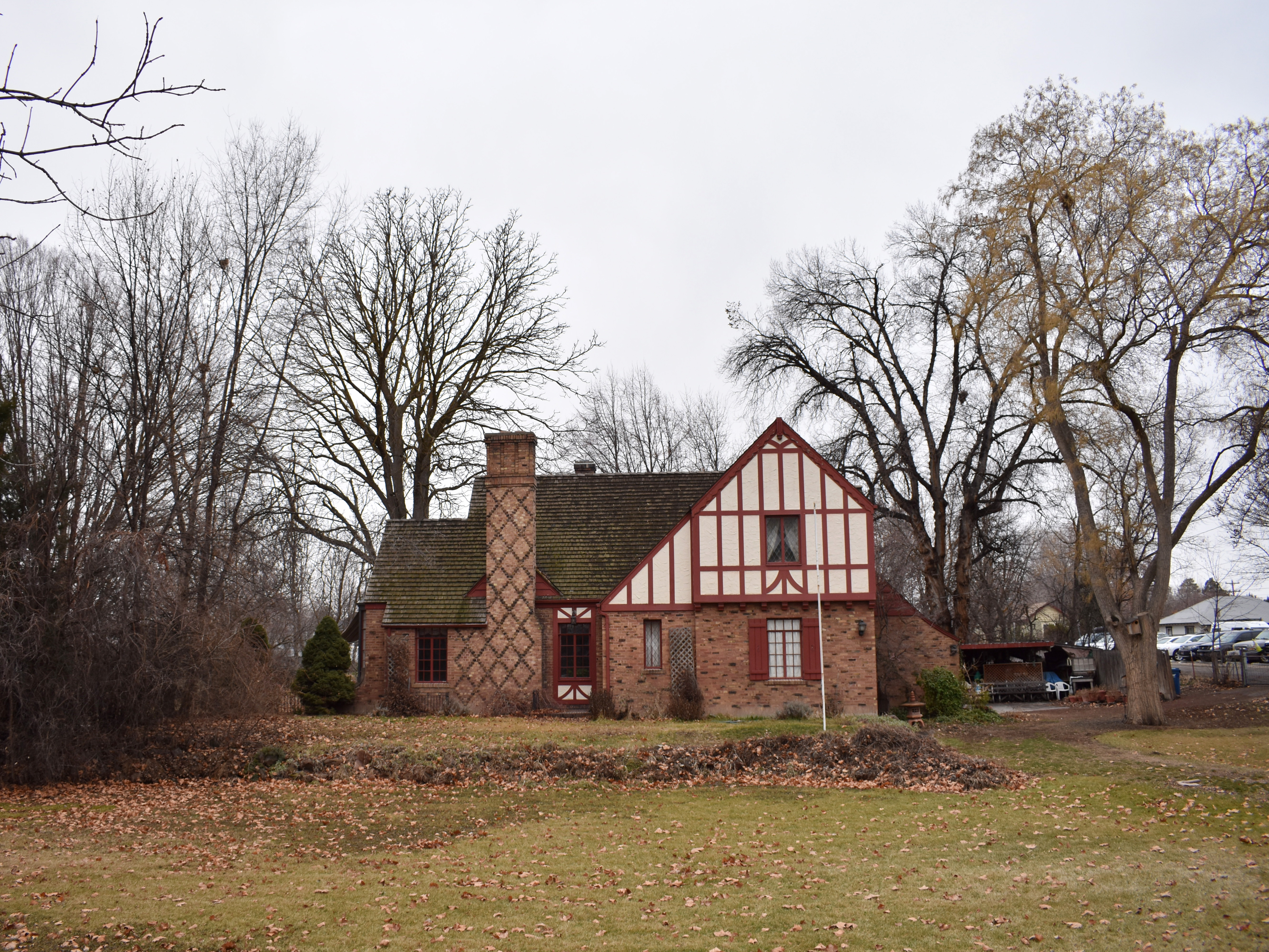
- The Orville Jackson House in 2019

- Location within Idaho Location within the United States
- Location: 127 S. Eagle Rd., Eagle, Idaho
- Coordinates: 43°41′39″N 116°21′12″W
- Area: less than one acre
- Built: 1932
- Architect: Tourtellotte & Hummel
- Architectural style: Tudoresque
- MPS: Tourtellotte and Hummel Architecture TR
- NRHP reference No.: 82000213
- Added to NRHP: November 17, 1982

The Orville Jackson House in Eagle, Idaho, is a brick and stucco, 1 1/2-story Tudor Revival structure designed by Tourtellotte and Hummel and constructed in 1932. The house features a decorative diamond pattern of clinker brick visible on the chimney. Projecting clinkers are evident also in the brickwork of the first floor outer walls. The house was added to the National Register of Historic Places in 1982.

Orville Jackson owned Orville Jackson's pharmacy in Eagle from 1922 until 1974.
