= Beckley Jackson House =

Historic house in Kentucky, United States

- U.S. National Register of Historic Places
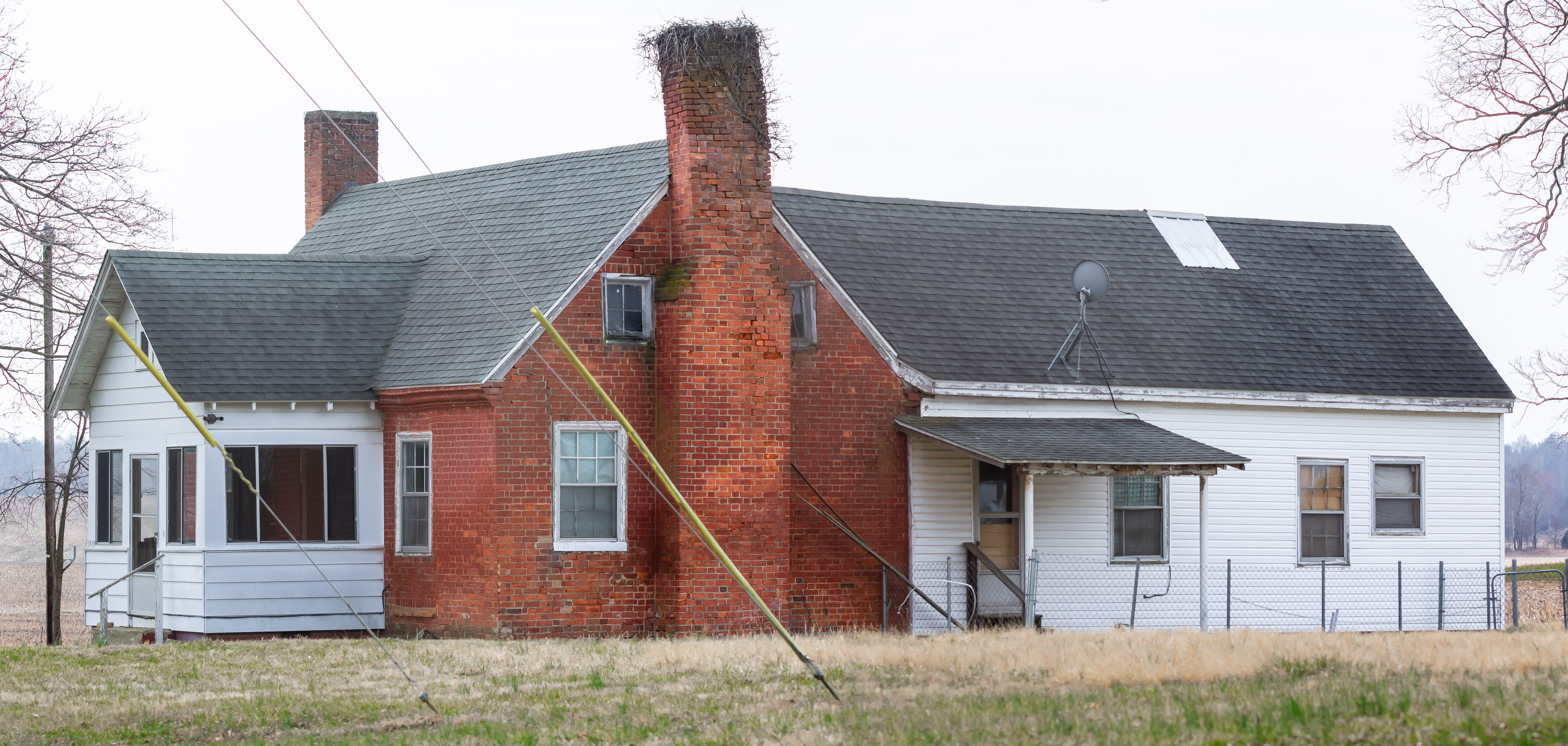

- Location within Kentucky Location within the United States
- Location: Kentucky Route 1069, 0.2 miles south of its junction with Jones Rd., near Hanson, Kentucky
- Coordinates: 37°26′40″N 87°31′50″W
- Area: less than one acre
- Built: c. 1830, c. 1900, c. 1920
- Architectural style: Single cell central passage
- MPS: Hopkins County MPS
- NRHP reference No.: 88002733
- Added to NRHP: March 23, 1989

The Beckley Jackson House, which has also been known as The Stagecoach Inn, near Hanson, Kentucky, was built c. 1830. It was listed on the National Register of Historic Places in 1989.

It was built as a Flemish bond brick single cell central passage plan house on what was then the Jackson-Providence Road. There may have been an original ell to the rear; a new ell replaced that around 1900, and an enclosed porch was added c.1920.

It was deemed " significant for its association as an early stage coach stop and post office in ante-bellum Hopkins County. It is the only building from this period associated with early inns along historic road routes in the county. The house is also the only remaining ante-bellum brick building in the rural area of the county."
