= Captain William Parker Jackson House =

Historic house in Florida, United States

- U.S. National Register of Historic Places
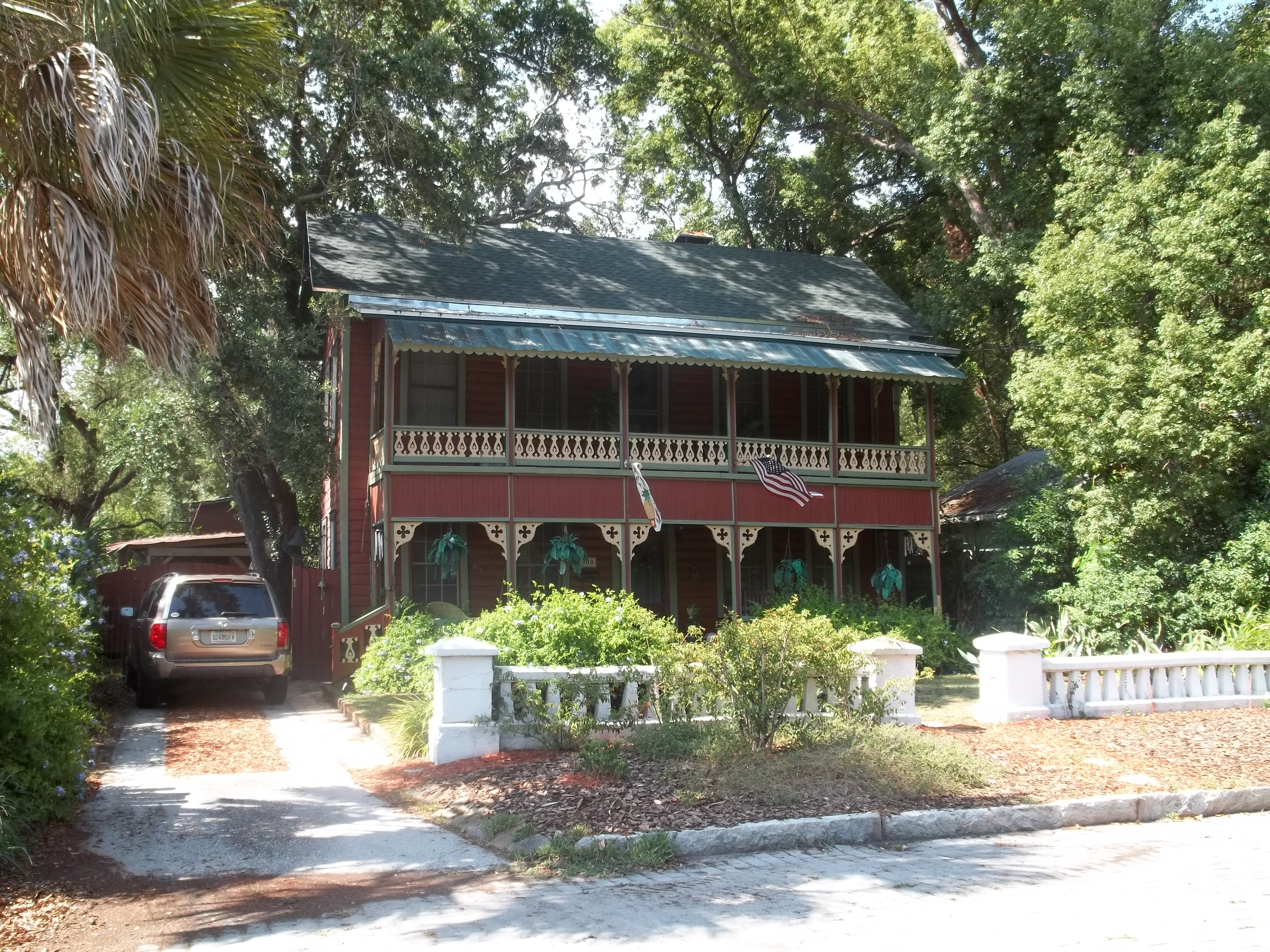
- Captain William Parker Jackson's house in 2011

- Location within Florida
- Location: 800 E Lambright St., Tampa, Florida
- Coordinates: 28.00674°N 82.45244°W
- NRHP reference No.: 11000159
- Added to NRHP: 8 April 2011

Captain William Parker Jackson House is a historic residence in the Seminole Heights area of Tampa, Florida. An 1870s farmhouse, it was once owned by prominent Tampa pioneers. It is listed on the National Register of Historic Places. Jackson was born November 11, 1847, to "first Anglo-American family to settle in the Tampa Wilderness."

According to the Tampa Bay Times, the house design is known as an I-house: a symmetrical structure popular from Colonial times through the 1800s. The property once included 152 acres along Nebraska Avenue (Tampa) up to the Hillsborough River, according to an 1852 survey plat.

Jackson's parents were Tampa pioneers Nancy Coller Jackson (born January 22, 1815, in St Mary's, Florida and died March 24, 1907, in Tampa) and Robert Andrew Jackson Jr. (born on 2 May 1802 in Philadelphia, Philadelphia County, Pennsylvania or New York and died on March 2, 1865, in Tampa), whose 1836 marriage is believed to have been the first recorded marriage on Florida's west coast, according to the Times. The farmland included cattle and orange groves; and Jackson piloted passenger and mail ships from Cedar Key to New Orleans and from Tampa to Cuba. The farmhouse's mantel may have been salvaged from the Hiram Cool, an iron-hulled steamship that ran aground.

The house is located at 800 East Lambright Street. It has been toured as part of the Old Seminole Heights annual home tour. The Old Seminole Heights Neighborhood Association assisted with the documentation for the designation.
