= Jackson House (Newton, Massachusetts) =

Historic house in Massachusetts, United States

- U.S. National Register of Historic Places
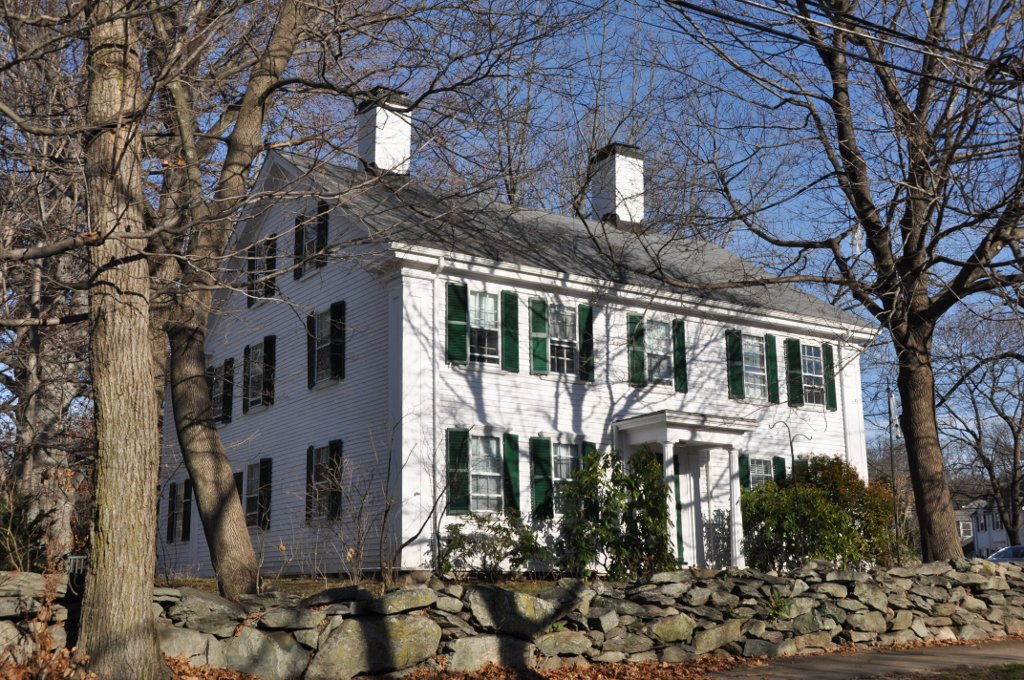

- Location within Massachusetts Location within the United States
- Location: 125 Jackson St., Newton, Massachusetts
- Coordinates: 42°19′13″N 71°11′18″W
- Built: 1768
- Architectural style: Georgian, Vernacular Georgian
- MPS: Newton MRA
- NRHP reference No.: 86001841
- Added to NRHP: September 04, 1986

The Jackson House is a historic house at 125 Jackson Street in Newton, Massachusetts. The 2 1/2-story timber-frame house was built either c. 1768 or c. 1782, and is one of Newton's few surviving 18th-century farmhouses. A house is known to have been on the property c. 1768, but the present house use construction methods and styling more common to a later period in the 18th century, suggesting a c. 1782 construction date. It was restyled in the 1850s to give it Greek Revival features.

The house was listed on the National Register of Historic Places in 1986.

== See also ==
- National Register of Historic Places listings in Newton, Massachusetts
