= Jackson House (Bentonville, Arkansas) =

Historic house in Arkansas, United States

- U.S. National Register of Historic Places
- U.S. Historic district – Contributing property
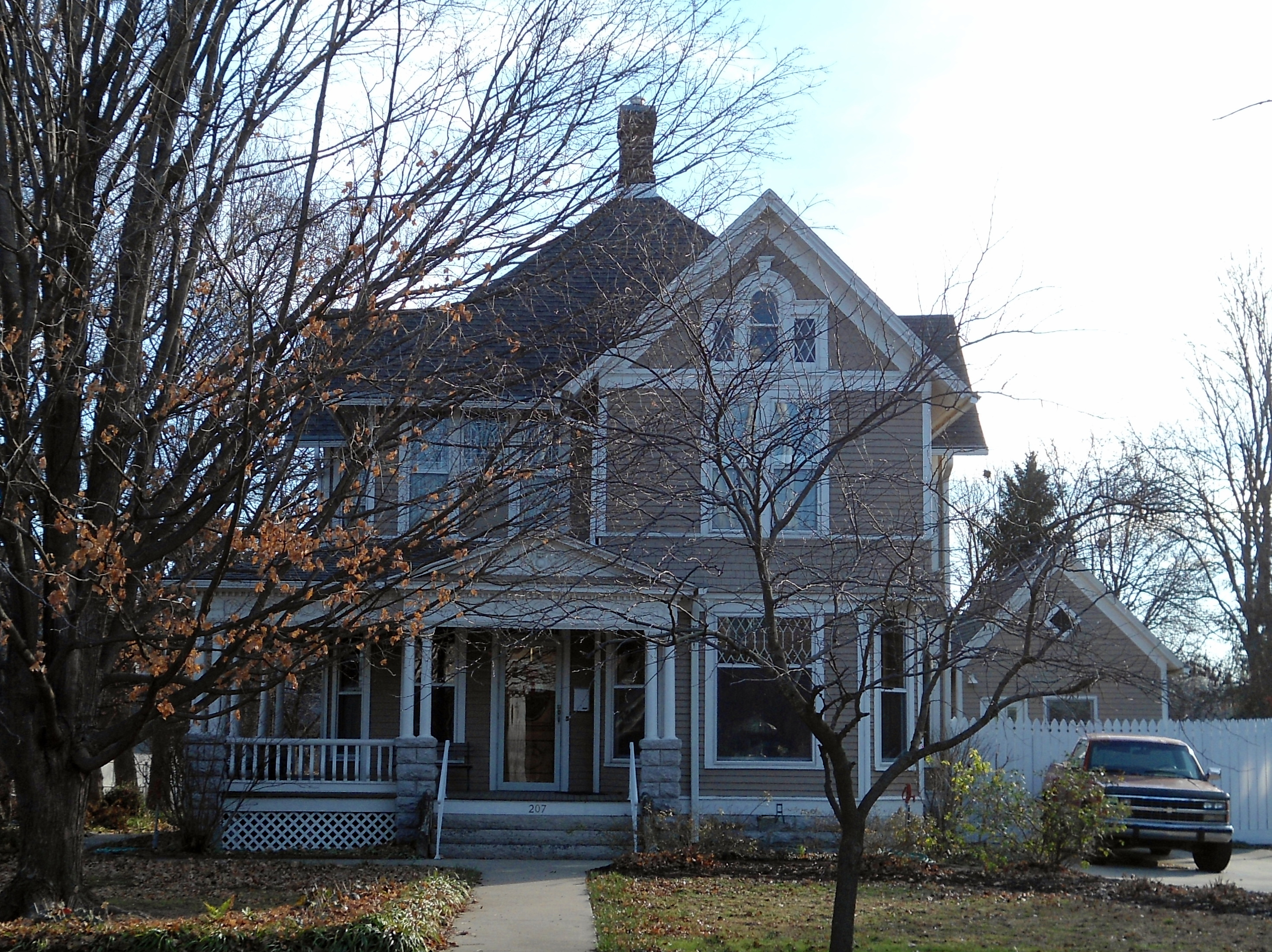

- Location within Arkansas Location within the United States
- Location: 207 W. Central, Bentonville, Arkansas
- Coordinates: 36°22′19″N 94°12′40″W
- Area: less than one acre
- Built: 1902
- Architectural style: Classical Revival, Late Victorian
- Part of: Bentonville West Central Avenue Historic District (ID92001349)
- MPS: Benton County MRA
- NRHP reference No.: 87002331

Significant dates
- Added to NRHP: January 28, 1988
- Designated CP: October 22, 1992

The Jackson House is a historic house in Bentonville, Arkansas. It is a 2 1/2-story wood-frame house, roughly cubical in shape, with a pyramidal roof and an asymmetric facade typical of the Queen Anne style. It has a wraparound single-story porch, supported by Corinthian columns, with flat sawn balusters. There is a small Palladian window in a front-facing projecting gable section. The house was built c. 1902.

The house was listed on the National Register of Historic Places in 1988.

== See also ==
- National Register of Historic Places listings in Benton County, Arkansas
