= Samuel Jackson Jr. House =

Historic house in Massachusetts, United States

- U.S. National Register of Historic Places
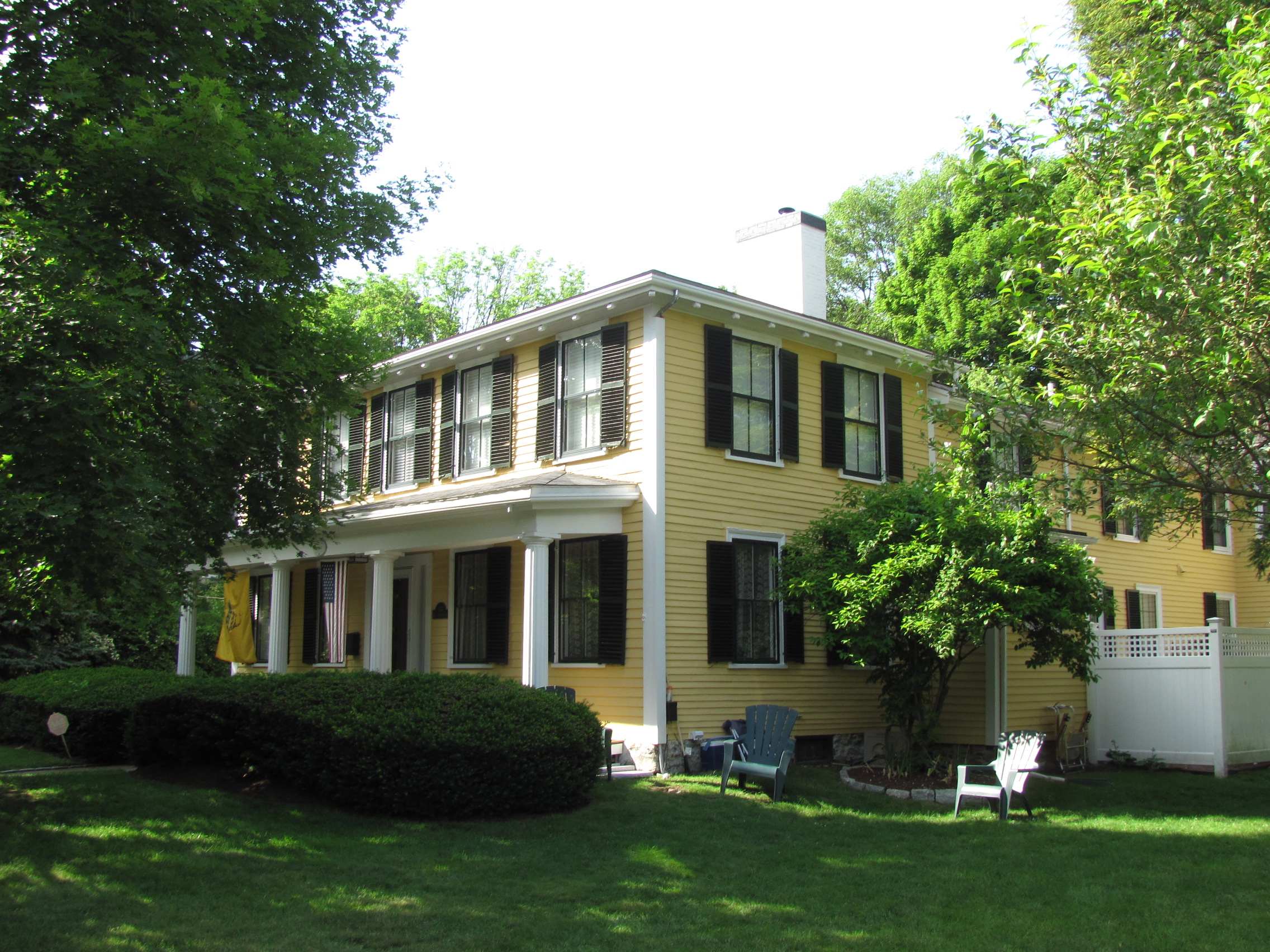
- Samuel Jackson Jr. House

- Location within Massachusetts Location within the United States
- Location: 137 Washington St., Newton, Massachusetts
- Coordinates: 42°21′21″N 71°10′49″W
- Architectural style: Greek Revival, Federal
- MPS: Newton MRA
- NRHP reference No.: 86001843
- Added to NRHP: September 04, 1986

The Samuel Jackson Jr. House is a historic house located at 137 Washington Street in Newton, Massachusetts.

== Description and history ==
The two-story wood-frame house was built c. 1768 by Samuel Jackson, the great-grandson of Edward Jackson, one of Newton's early settlers. The five-bay facade is typical of Federal style houses, as are the rear twin chimneys. The front porch, with its fluted columns, is a 19th-century addition, as are the sidelight windows flanking the front door.

The house was listed on the National Register of Historic Places on September 4, 1986.

== See also ==
- National Register of Historic Places listings in Newton, Massachusetts
