= Jackson–Swisher House and Carriage House =

Historic house in Iowa, United States

- Jackson-Swisher House and Carriage House
- U.S. National Register of Historic Places
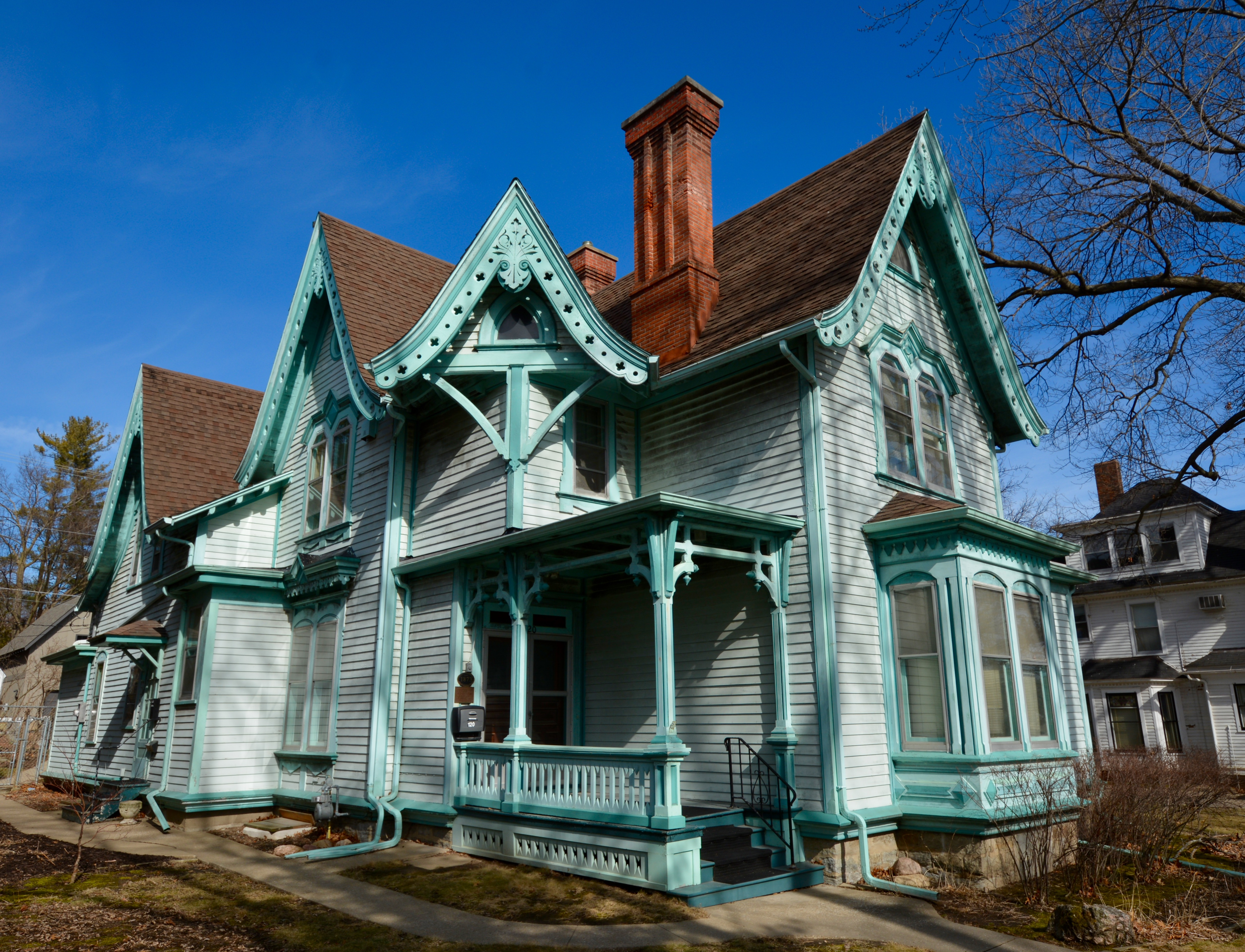

- Location within Iowa Location within the United States
- Location: 120 E. Fairchild St. Iowa City, Iowa
- Coordinates: 41°40′01.8″N 91°32′01.3″W
- Area: less than one acre
- Built: 1877
- Built by: Louis H. Jackson
- Architectural style: Gothic Revival
- NRHP reference No.: 82000412
- Added to NRHP: November 10, 1982

The Jackson–Swisher House and Carriage House, also known as the Old Swisher Place, is a historic building located in Iowa City, Iowa, United States. Louis H. Jackson, who built the house, was a local attorney until he relocated to Denver, Colorado. Stephen A. Swisher, who lived here for 40 years, started an insurance agency and served as a curator and president of the State Historical Society of Iowa. Both were graduates of the University of Iowa. The house's primary significance is architectural, and it is said to have "more characteristics of the Gothic Revival than any other house in Iowa City." The steeply pitched cross gable roof is set off by bargeboards with quatrefoil and circular openings. The paired windows of various designs, the window bays, the dormer-like window above the main entrance, and the fluted chimneys lend a picturesque quality. The front porch features tracery ornamentation. The former carriage house, converted into a garage in 1946, is simpler in its ornamentation. It has paired windows on the second floor, and like the main house, there is a gentle flair at the eaves. The buildings were listed together on the National Register of Historic Places in 1982.
