= Samuel and Elbert Jackson House =

Historic house in New York, United States

- U.S. National Register of Historic Places
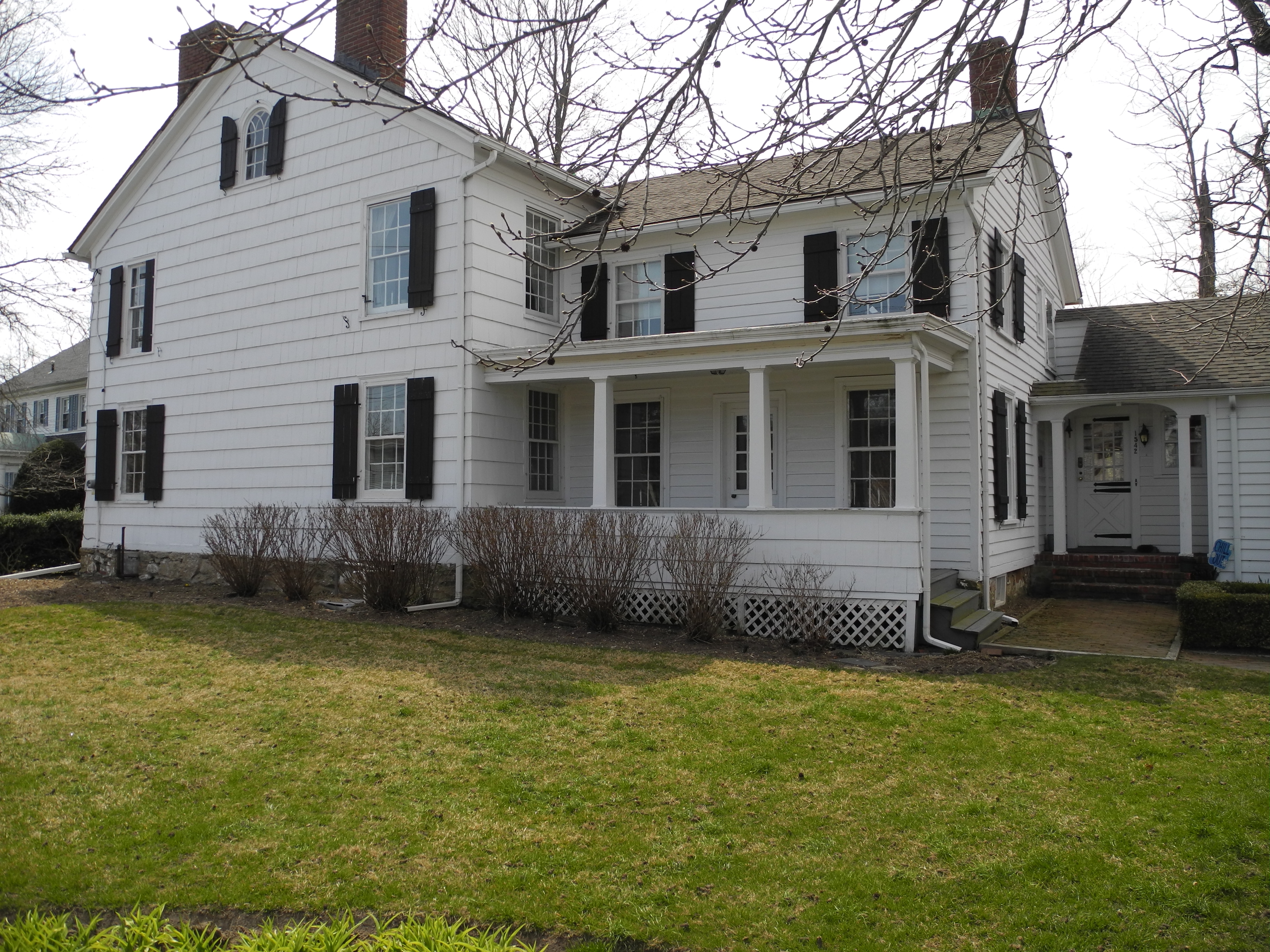
- Samuel and Elbert Jackson House, April 2013

- Location within New York Location within the United States
- Location: 1542 Wantagh Ave., Wantagh, New York
- Coordinates: 40°41′4″N 73°30′39″W
- Area: less than one acre
- Architectural style: Greek Revival
- NRHP reference No.: 06000563
- Added to NRHP: July 14, 2006

Samuel and Elbert Jackson House is a historic home located at Wantagh in Nassau County, New York. It is an essentially L-shaped dwelling. It is a 2 1/2-story wood-frame structure with rear and side wings, one of which dates to the 18th century. The large main, square central block dates from the mid-19th century and is two stories with a simple, straight pitched gable roof. There are Greek Revival details.

It was listed on the National Register of Historic Places in 2006.
