= George Jackson House (Toronto) =

Coordinates: 43.73495°N 79.48467°W

View from the street (east), February 2017

The George Jackson House is a heritage farmhouse in Toronto, Ontario, Canada. Located at 2950 Keele Street in the Downsview neighbourhood, it was designated as a protected heritage property on November 1, 2012.

The bylaw referenced above reads in part "The George Jackson House has design or physical value as a representative example of a late 19th-century farmhouse. The design blends elements from the Queen Anne Revival and Richardsonian Romanesque styles popularized in the late 1800s."

It is one of only four buildings in the Downsview neighbourhood that is listed in the Toronto inventory of heritage properties.

It is currently rented out as office space.
