= Referendums in Canada =

Referendums have been held in Canada at the federal, provincial and city levels.

National referendums are seldom used in Canada; only three have ever been held. The first two referendums in 1898 and 1942 saw a large number of voters in Quebec and in the remainder of Canada take dramatically opposing stands, and the third in 1992 saw most of the voters take a stand opposed to that of the party in power.

== National referendums ==
=== Plebiscite on prohibition ===
The question:

Are you in favour of the passing of an Act prohibiting the importation, manufacture or sale of spirits, wine, ale, beer, cider and all other alcoholic liquors for use as beverages?
French: Êtes-vous favourable à la passation d'une loi défendant l'importation, la fabrication ou la vente de spiritueux, vins, bière, ale, cidre et de toutes autres liqueurs alcooliques comme breuvages ?

Canadian plebiscite on prohibition September 29, 1898
Jurisdiction	Yes		No	
Jurisdiction	Votes	%	Votes	%
British Columbia	5,731	54.6	4,756	45.4
Manitoba	12,419	80.7	2,978	19.3
New Brunswick	26,919	73.8	9,575	26.2
Northwest Territories	6,238	68.8	2,824	31.2
Nova Scotia	34,678	86.6	5,370	13.4
Ontario	154,498	57.3	115,284	42.7
Prince Edward Island	9,461	89.2	1,146	10.8
Quebec	28,582	18.9	122,614	81.1
Canada	278,526	51.3	264,547	48.7

The government did not adopt Prohibition, saying the overall majority in favour of Prohibition was slight and turn-out low.

=== Plebiscite on conscription ===
The Question:

Are you in favour of releasing the Government from any obligations arising out of any past commitments restricting the methods of raising men for military service?
French: Consentez-vous à libérer le gouvernement de toute obligation résultant d'engagements antérieurs restreignant les méthodes de mobilisation pour le service militaire ?

Canadian conscription plebiscite, 1942 Provincial results
Jurisdiction	Yes		No	
Jurisdiction	Votes	%	Votes	%
Alberta	186,624	71.1	75,880	28.9
British Columbia	253,844	80.4	62,033	19.6
Manitoba	218,093	80.3	53,651	19.7
New Brunswick	105,629	69.8	45,743	30.2
Nova Scotia	120,763	77.1	35,840	22.1
Ontario	1,202,953	84.0	229,847	16.0
Prince Edward Island	23,569	82.9	4,869	17.1
Quebec	375,650	27.9	971,925	72.1
Saskatchewan	183,617	73.1	67,654	26.9
Yukon	847	74.4	291	25.6
Total civilian vote	2,670,088	63.3	1,547,724	36.7
Military vote	251,118	80.5	60,885	19.5
Canada	2,921,206	64.5	1,608,609	35.5

The referendum was held in all 245 electoral districts, which covered all nine provinces and one of the two territories. Residents in the Northwest Territories did not have a vote, as their area was not organized as an electoral district. Based on the result, the government adopted conscription but with a light touch, initially adopting the policy that those conscripted would not be sent overseas to active fighting. These inactive conscripts were nicknamed "zombies".

=== Referendum on the Charlottetown Accord ===
The Question:

Do you agree that the Constitution of Canada should be renewed on the basis of the agreement reached on August 28, 1992?
French: Acceptez-vous que la Constitution du Canada soit renouvelée sur la base de l'entente conclue le 28 août 1992 ?

National Referendum on the Charlottetown Accord (October 26, 1992)
Jurisdiction	Yes		No	
Jurisdiction	Votes	%	Votes	%
Alberta	483,275	39.8	731,975	60.2
British Columbia	525,188	31.8	1,126,761	68.2
Manitoba	198,230	38.0	322,971	62.0
New Brunswick	230,010	61.7	145,096	38.3
Newfoundland	133,193	63.1	77,881	36.9
Northwest Territories	14,750	61.0	9,416	39.0
Nova Scotia	218,618	48.7	230,182	51.3
Ontario	2,410,119	50.1	2,397,665	49.9
Prince Edward Island	48,687	74.0	17,124	26.0
Quebec	1,710,117	43.4	2,232,280	56.6
Saskatchewan	203,361	44.6	252,459	55.4
Yukon	5,354	43.6	6,922	56.4
Canada	6,185,902	45.0	7,550,732	55.0

=== Proposed referendums ===
During the 2004 federal election, the NDP stated that it would require the federal government to hold a national referendum on electoral reform (specifically proportional representation) for support from the NDP should the Liberals win a minority government. The Liberals won a minority, and the NDP announced they would press for electoral reform through a referendum. The possibility of a national referendum on electoral reform was made more likely through the Throne speech that opened Parliament in October 2004, in which former Liberal Prime Minister Paul Martin included electoral reform in his plan for the next Parliament. However, no action was taken.

Conservative Leader Stephen Harper became Prime Minister as a result of the 2006 federal election, ending the Liberals' opportunity to move on their promise.

Liberal Leader Justin Trudeau campaigned on a platform of electoral reform in the 2015 federal election, promising to eliminate the current "first-past-the-post" single-member plurality voting system. While Trudeau had said that he liked a system where the distribution of seats was more in line with the popular vote on a Canada-wide basis, he had acquired a preference for Instant-runoff voting, which he called preferential voting as it uses ranked ballots. His government announced in December 2015 that an all-party parliamentary committee would be formed in early 2016 to consider a variety of alternative election systems, including proportional representation. During a discussion of the plan, Democratic Institutions Minister Maryam Monsef referred to it as "an open and robust process of consultation". However, she refused to commit to the Conservative Party's demand for a public referendum that would allow Canadians to vote on their preferred electoral system, indicating that she did not want to "prejudice the outcome of that consultation process". In the end the parliamentary committee did not settle on one alternative system, and PM Trudeau did not move to reform the election system.

There had been discussion regarding a national referendum over the issue of same-sex marriage, which was a divisive issue in Canada. A national plebiscite had been suggested by Alberta Premier Ralph Klein and some Conservatives and Liberal backbenchers. However, Paul Martin's Liberal government, with the support of the NDP and Bloc Québécois, passed the Civil Marriage Act, legalizing same-sex marriage through Parliament in July 2005 without holding a plebiscite. In December 2006, Stephen Harper's government introduced a motion to re-open the marriage debate, which lost. Notably, members of all parties, including some Conservative cabinet members, voted it down.

As well, in 1920 six provinces held referendums on federal restrictions on the inter-provincial trade in liquor.

== Provincial and Territorial referendums ==
For a list of Wikipedia articles on provincial referendums, see Category:Referendums in Canada by province or territory.

=== Alberta ===
Alberta has held several referendums during its history.

Three concerned Prohibition (ban on the sale of liquor). The referendums resulted in the adoption, retention and replacement of Prohibition -- 1915, 1920 and 1923, respectively. A referendum in 1967 was on whether or not "un-escorted" women could drink with men.

Another referendum held in 1948 was on whether or not the provincial government should take control of the province's electrical generation and distribution system, at the time a mixed system of municipal and private corporate ownership, and on the preferred method of rural electrification - private corporations or provincial government.

That province also saw referendums on daylight savings in 1967, 1971 and 2021.

In 2021, Alberta conducted a two-part referendum on whether equalization payments should be eliminated from Canada's constitution and whether Alberta should observe daylight saving time year-round. Despite a majority in favour of retention of seasonal DLT, the government moved to permanent DLT in 2026.

On October 19, 2026, Albertans are scheduled to vote on ten questions including whether to stay in Canada or to proceed to a clear vote on separation.

=== British Columbia ===
In British Columbia has held several referendums. A few of them are listed here.

BC held a plebiscite on inter-provincial trade in liquor in 1920.

In BC, a Treaty Referendum was held on First Nations treaty rights in 2002. The referendum proposed eight questions that voters were asked to either support or oppose. Critics claimed the phrasing was flawed or biased toward a predetermined response. Critics, especially First Nations and religious groups, called for a boycott of the referendum, and only about one third of ballots were returned, significantly less than the usual turnout in provincial general elections. The ballots that were returned showed enthusiastic support, with over 80 per cent of participating voters agreeing to all eight proposed principles.

A referendum on electoral reform on May 17, 2005, was held in conjunction with the provincial election that year. British Columbian voters were asked to approve a new electoral system based on the Single Transferable Vote called BC STV. It passed with the support of a majority of voters (57%), but failed to meet the required "supermajority" threshold of 60%. Premier Gordon Campbell announced due to the large support shown for electoral reform a second referendum would be held in correspondence with the 2009 British Columbia general election. This referendum would also have required approval by 60% of those voting.

The second referendum was held on May 12, 2009, in conjunction with the provincial election. The results were a "supermajority" of 60.92% voting for retaining the current "first past the post" electoral system and 39.8% voting for the proposed Single Transferable Vote.

A mail-in referendum was held from June 13 to August 5, 2011, on the fate of the province's harmonized sales tax. The government pledged to discontinue the tax if more than 50% of the voters opt to have the tax discontinued. It was passed, with 55% in favour.

The province held another referendum on proportional representation in late 2018. With 42% turnout, proportional representation was defeated by 61% of the vote.

=== Manitoba ===
Manitoba held a referendum on Prohibition in 1892. A majority voted in favour.

Manitoba held a referendum on Prohibition in 1902. A majority voted against prohibition.

Prohibition referendums were also held in 1916. Manitoba held a plebiscite on inter-provincial trade in liquor in 1920. In a 1923 referendum, a majority voted to drop prohibition.

Around 2019 the Manitoba legislative assembly debated Bill 8, The Referendum Act.

=== Newfoundland and Labrador ===
The island of Newfoundland, then a British colony, held two referendums in 1948 to determine its future. An initial referendum was held on June 3, 1948, to decide between continuing with the British appointed Commission of Government that had ruled the island since the 1930s, revert to dominion status with responsible government, or join Canadian Confederation. The result was inconclusive, with 44.6% supporting the restoration of dominion status, 41.1% for confederation with Canada, and 14.3% for continuing the Commission of Government. A second referendum on July 22, 1948, which asked Newfoundlanders to choose between confederation and dominion status, was decided by a vote of 52% to 48% for confederation with Canada. Newfoundland joined Canada on March 31, 1949.

A referendum was held in Newfoundland and Labrador in 1995 that approved replacing the province's system of parochial schools with a largely public school system. In 1997, a second referendum to amend the Terms of Union to allow for the Catholic and Pentecostal school systems to be disbanded and brought into the public system.

In the lead up to and following his victory in the 2025 provincial election, Progressive Conservative Party of Newfoundland and Labrador leader and Premier-designate Tony Wakeham promised that, following a review of a recent deal struck with Hydro-Québec by the outgoing Liberal government of John Hogan, a referendum would be held on the deal. On August 17, 2026, following the Government of Newfoundland and Labrador, Government of Quebec, and the Government of Canada announcing a substantially revised agreement concerning the Churchill River system, Premier Wakeham announced that a referendum would not be held.

=== New Brunswick ===
New Brunswick held a plebiscite on inter-provincial trade in liquor in 1920.

On May 14, 2001, New Brunswick held a referendum on whether to continue to permit Video Lottery Terminals to operate in the province. 53.1% of those who voted voted in favour of retaining the terminals.

=== Northwest Territories ===
Two referendums were held in Northwest Territories.

- 1982 division of territory into two regions
- 1992 boundary between the two regions, creating Territory of Nunavut in 1999.

=== Nova Scotia ===
Nova Scotia held a plebiscite on inter-provincial trade in liquor in 1920. In another referendum, Nova Scotia voted against prohibition on October 31, 1929.

In 2004, Nova Scotia held a plebiscite on whether to allow 'Sunday shopping'. The result was a slight victory for the No side although the government went ahead and legalized Sunday Shopping the following year after a court decision overturned the law.

=== Ontario ===
On October 10, 2007, Ontario held a referendum on whether or not to adopt a mixed-member proportional election system. The proposed change failed, with 63% voting for the status quo first-past-the-post voting. This was the first referendum in that province since 1924 when a referendum on prohibition was held.

=== Prince Edward Island ===
The small province of Prince Edward Island (under 150,000 people and therefore in scale more like a municipal government) has had several referendums in its past, although the term used in the province is a plebiscite.

On January 18, 1988, a provincial plebiscite was held to determine if Islanders were in favour of a fixed link to the mainland. It passed 60% to 40%. This allowed the provincial and federal governments to attract contractors to build what is now the Confederation Bridge.

On November 28, 2005, Islanders were asked to vote by plebiscite whether or not they wanted mixed-member proportional representation - partly district contest-based; partly "party list-based" - electoral system. Islanders decided, 64% to 36%, to keep the status quo first-past-the-post system. A second plebiscite was held in 2016 concerning mixed-member proportional representation, with the result of 52% of Islanders voting to make the change. Citing low voter turnout (below 40%) in the plebiscite, the government refused to implement the reform. A third plebiscite in 2019 saw a reversal: roughly 52% of voters rejected the proposed change to the electoral system.

=== Quebec ===
At least three referendums have been held in Quebec:

- 1919 - April 10: Referendum on the legalization of the sale of alcohol. The Yes side won.
- 1980 - May 20: Referendum on the Sovereignty-Association proposal. The No side won.
- 1995 - October 30: Referendum on Sovereignty with optional partnership offer. The No side narrowly won.

As well, the 1992 country-wide referendum on the Charlottetown Accord was organized by the DGEQ in Quebec, while Elections Canada organized it in the rest of Canada.

==== Proposed referendums ====
In 2021, the Quebec government cancelled an electoral reform referendum.

In 2022, the Quebec Premier François Legault raised the idea of holding a referendum on getting more immigration powers from federal government. In 2024, Quebec Premier François Legault repeated his threat that Quebec might hold a referendum on immigration powers if Prime Minister Justin Trudeau does not give the province more control over immigration.

=== Saskatchewan ===
Saskatchewan held a referendum on prohibition in 1915 in which a majority voted in favour. It also held a plebiscite on inter-provincial trade in liquor in 1920. It conducted a referendum on prohibition on July 16, 1923. This time a majority voted to replace prohibition with government-run liquor stores.

=== Yukon ===
These referendums were held in Yukon.

- 1916 August Prohibition. Wets won by three votes.
- 1920 February Prohibition. Prohibitionists narrowly had more votes than those who wanted bars continued and also narrowly more votes than those who wanted government liquor stores.
- 1921 July Prohibition. Wets won. public drinking eventually coming in in 1925.
- 2025 October electoral reform.

== Municipal referendums ==
City referendums are quite common.

They are held on questions of spending money for large-scale projects and on more general social questions.

In 1915 voters in Ottawa voted on switching to proportional representation, and a majority were in favour.

In 1921 Montrealers voted the on adoption of STV for city elections. A majority were opposed.
