= 2026 Alberta referendum =

Canadian provincial referendums

- October 19, 2026
- Ten questions related to provincial–federal relations, rights of citizens vs non-citizens, election security measures, and Alberta separatism
- Non-constitutional questions (5)
Position	Yes	No
Referendums passed	5	0
Avg. votes	1,114,235	947,094
Avg. percentage	54.05%	45.95%
- Constitutional questions (4)
Position	Yes	No
Referendums passed	0	4
Avg. votes	921,734	1,135,159
Avg. percentage	44.81%	55.19%
- Separation question
Position	Remain in Canada	Hold referendum
Votes	1,556,316	520,233
Percentage	74.95%	25.05%

On October 19, 2026 a referendum was held in Alberta on ten separate ballot questions, one of which addressed Albertan independence from Canada. Alberta premier Danielle Smith had previously announced the referendum in February of the same year. In her address, she announced that Albertans will be asked to vote on nine questions. Five questions were non-constitutional and pertained to immigration laws and election security in Alberta. The other four were constitutional, and relate to Alberta's relationship with the Government of Canada, seeking amendments to the Constitution of Canada. On May 21, 2026, Smith announced a tenth referendum question, on whether Alberta should remain within Canada or pursue a path toward a binding referendum on separating from Canada. For the first 9 ballot questions, results have not yet been finalized, however, on the question of Albertan independence, the CBC projected a "no" result at 11:12 PM local (Mountain) Time.

== Background ==
=== Referendum process ===
In early 2026, premier Danielle Smith promised a referendum on immigration, social services, and Constitutional questions arising from the Alberta Next town halls. On March 31, 2026, the Government of Alberta approved two orders-in-council under the Referendum Act which posed nine questions to Albertans on October 19, 2026. The results of the non-constitutional questions are non-binding on the government. In April, the government launched a website intended to educate voters on the referendum questions; however, the website was criticized as a biased use of government funds to persuade voters to vote in favour of the questions.

The referendum was administered under Alberta's Referendum Act and Election Act. Eligible voters were residents who are Canadian citizens, aged 18 years or older, and an ordinary resident at the time of the vote.

=== Previous referendums in Alberta ===
Seven provincial referendums have occurred in Alberta. Referendums on prohibition occurred in 1915, 1920, and 1923. A referendum was held in 1948 on the creation of a provincial government electrical utility. There were also referendums on changes to liquor laws in 1957; daylight saving time in 1967 and in 1971, and in 2021 referendums on cancellation of Canada's equalization program and daylight saving time.

=== Alberta sovereignty petitions ===
Support for Alberta separatism has increased since the 2015 Canadian federal election, where Liberal Party of Canada leader Justin Trudeau was elected prime minister of Canada. This continued after the 2025 Canadian federal election, in which his successor, Mark Carney, led the Liberals to a fourth consecutive term in government.

Under Alberta's Citizen Initiative Act, Albertans can petition the government to hold a referendum on a topic once a certain number of signatures are collected. On May 15, 2025, the law was modified to lower the threshold for triggering a citizen initiative petition from 20% of eligible voters to 10% of votes cast in the previous election, and extended the signature-gathering period for petitions from 90 days to 120 days.

Two petitions have allegedly reached the minimum signature triggers. As of May 2026, neither petition question is present on the October 2026 referendum. Thomas Lukaszuk's Alberta Forever Canada petition was verified by Elections Alberta to have collected 404,293 signatures, and asks: "Do you agree that Alberta should remain in Canada?" The Stay Free Alberta petition claims to have collected over 301,000 signatures, and asks: "Do you agree that the province of Alberta shall become a sovereign country and cease to be a province in Canada?"

== Results ==
=== Non-constitutional questions ===
==== Question 1 ====
Do you support the Government of Alberta taking increased control over immigration for the purposes of decreasing immigration to more sustainable levels, prioritizing economic migration and giving Albertans first priority on new employment opportunities?

Question 1
Choice	Votes	%
Yes	1,127,729	54.84
No	928,742	45.16
Total	2,056,471	100.00
Valid votes	2,056,471	93.37
Invalid/blank votes	146,142	6.63
Total votes	2,202,613	100.00
Registered voters/turnout	3,148,205	69.96
Source: Elections Alberta

Question 1 results by electoral district
Electoral district	Yes		No		Total
Electoral district	Votes	%	Votes	%	Total
Calgary-Acadia	11,314	47.02	12,750	52.98	24,064
Calgary-Beddington	12,518	55.65	9,977	44.35	22,495
Calgary-Bow	14,265	46.98	16,101	53.02	30,366
Calgary-Buffalo	9,699	39.19	15,048	60.81	24,747
Calgary-Cross	7,730	49.96	7,742	50.04	15,472
Calgary-Currie	9,602	41.71	13,421	58.29	23,023
Calgary-East	9,154	55.74	7,269	44.26	16,423
Calgary-Edgemont	11,290	44.48	14,092	55.52	25,382
Calgary-Elbow	11,344	42.06	15,630	57.94	26,974
Calgary-Falconridge	6,956	46.16	8,114	53.84	15,070
Calgary-Fish Creek	13,671	50.26	13,531	49.74	27,202
Calgary-Foothills	13,232	47.84	14,427	52.16	27,659
Calgary-Glenmore	12,539	46.12	14,646	53.88	27,185
Calgary-Hays	13,972	56.38	10,808	43.62	24,780
Calgary-Klein	10,018	44.84	12,326	55.16	22,344
Calgary-Lougheed	11,296	54.67	9,365	45.33	20,661
Calgary-Bhullar-McCall	5,292	40.50	7,774	59.50	13,066
Calgary-Mountain View	9,379	33.11	18,949	66.89	28,328
Calgary-North	10,275	50.27	10,166	49.73	20,441
Calgary-North East	12,227	47.16	13,699	52.84	25,926
Calgary-North West	13,024	46.90	14,746	53.10	27,770
Calgary-Peigan	12,284	53.26	10,781	46.74	23,065
Calgary-Shaw	17,478	55.08	14,254	44.92	31,732
Calgary-South East	18,500	56.59	14,189	43.41	32,689
Calgary-Varsity	9,319	37.98	15,220	62.02	24,539
Calgary-West	12,428	49.42	12,721	50.58	25,149
Edmonton-Beverly-Clareview	8,886	50.22	8,808	49.78	17,694
Edmonton-Castle Downs	10,632	48.52	11,280	51.48	21,912
Edmonton-City Centre	6,325	31.82	13,552	68.18	19,877
Edmonton-Decore	9,021	49.44	9,227	50.56	18,248
Edmonton-Ellerslie	11,002	46.87	12,470	53.13	23,472
Edmonton-Glenora	7,663	35.86	13,707	64.14	21,370
Edmonton-Gold Bar	9,114	34.97	16,950	65.03	26,064
Edmonton-Highlands-Norwood	6,273	38.47	10,032	61.53	16,305
Edmonton-Manning	11,455	49.28	11,790	50.72	23,245
Edmonton-McClung	8,599	45.82	10,168	54.18	18,767
Edmonton-Meadows	9,414	44.80	11,599	55.20	21,013
Edmonton-Mill Woods	9,915	48.52	10,521	51.48	20,436
Edmonton-North West	9,448	46.14	11,029	53.86	20,477
Edmonton-Riverview	6,872	34.84	12,850	65.16	19,722
Edmonton-Rutherford	8,428	37.70	13,925	62.30	22,353
Edmonton-South	14,892	46.82	16,918	53.18	31,810
Edmonton-South West	17,409	49.19	17,982	50.81	35,391
Edmonton-Strathcona	5,810	27.52	15,301	72.48	21,111
Edmonton-West Henday	13,072	49.57	13,298	50.43	26,370
Edmonton-Whitemud	9,655	40.22	14,351	59.78	24,006
Airdrie-Cochrane	23,253	60.39	15,250	39.61	38,503
Airdrie-East	19,407	64.20	10,824	35.80	30,231
Athabasca-Barrhead-Westlock	16,574	71.58	6,582	28.42	23,156
Banff-Kananaskis	12,830	44.63	15,916	55.37	28,746
Bonnyville-Cold Lake-St. Paul	14,720	69.24	6,540	30.76	21,260
Brooks-Medicine Hat	14,928	67.87	7,066	32.13	21,994
Camrose	15,355	68.39	7,096	31.61	22,451
Cardston-Siksika	12,259	69.29	5,434	30.71	17,693
Central Peace-Notley	9,785	76.59	2,991	23.41	12,776
Chestermere-Strathmore	18,575	65.34	9,854	34.66	28,429
Cypress-Medicine Hat	15,786	63.97	8,890	36.03	24,676
Drayton Valley-Devon	19,055	74.61	6,483	25.39	25,538
Drumheller-Stettler	15,492	78.41	4,266	21.59	19,758
Fort McMurray-Lac La Biche	9,899	68.91	4,466	31.09	14,365
Fort McMurray-Wood Buffalo	7,008	72.89	2,606	27.11	9,614
Fort Saskatchewan-Vegreville	18,393	66.42	9,301	33.58	27,694
Grande Prairie	12,128	65.61	6,356	34.39	18,484
Grande Prairie-Wapiti	17,721	76.56	5,425	23.44	23,146
Highwood	19,461	66.30	9,891	33.70	29,352
Innisfail-Sylvan Lake	19,438	72.97	7,200	27.03	26,638
Lac Ste. Anne-Parkland	17,306	70.32	7,306	29.68	24,612
Lacombe-Ponoka	17,570	71.84	6,888	28.16	24,458
Leduc-Beaumont	18,622	62.92	10,975	37.08	29,597
Lesser Slave Lake	5,760	58.06	4,160	41.94	9,920
Lethbridge-East	12,535	51.87	11,632	48.13	24,167
Lethbridge-West	12,444	47.08	13,990	52.92	26,434
Livingstone-Macleod	18,163	65.74	9,465	34.26	27,628
Maskwacis-Wetaskiwin	13,986	65.28	7,439	34.72	21,425
Morinville-St. Albert	17,262	58.05	12,474	41.95	29,736
Olds-Didsbury-Three Hills	20,596	75.19	6,796	24.81	27,392
Peace River	9,139	62.34	5,522	37.66	14,661
Red Deer-North	13,288	62.12	8,104	37.88	21,392
Red Deer-South	15,911	59.86	10,669	40.14	26,580
Rimbey-Rocky Mountain House-Sundre	19,492	78.52	5,332	21.48	24,824
Sherwood Park	15,381	51.22	14,646	48.78	30,027
Spruce Grove-Stony Plain	18,930	61.00	12,103	39.00	31,033
St. Albert	13,758	46.28	15,967	53.72	29,725
Strathcona-Sherwood Park	17,409	58.73	12,232	41.27	29,641
Taber-Warner	13,805	75.18	4,558	24.82	18,363
Vermilion-Lloydminster-Wainwright	15,443	76.07	4,859	23.93	20,302
West Yellowhead	16,171	70.63	6,725	29.37	22,896
Total	1,127,729	54.84	927,783	45.16	2,056,471
Source: Elections Alberta

==== Question 2 ====
Do you support the Government of Alberta introducing a law mandating that only Canadian citizens, permanent residents and individuals with an Alberta-approved immigration status will be eligible for provincially-funded programs, such as health care, education and other social services?

Question 2
Choice	Votes	%
Yes	1,078,681	52.46
No	977,384	47.54
Total	2,056,065	100.00
Valid votes	2,056,065	93.23
Invalid/blank votes	149,340	6.77
Total votes	2,205,405	100.00
Registered voters/turnout	3,148,205	70.05
Source: Elections Alberta

Question 2 results by electoral district
Electoral district	Yes		No		Total
Electoral district	Votes	%	Votes	%	Total
Calgary-Acadia	10,855	45.53	12,989	54.47	23,844
Calgary-Beddington	10,096	44.83	12,423	55.17	22,519
Calgary-Bow	13,345	44.64	16,547	55.36	29,892
Calgary-Buffalo	8,863	36.77	15,242	63.23	24,105
Calgary-Cross	7,382	47.84	8,050	52.16	15,432
Calgary-Currie	9,185	37.58	15,255	62.42	24,440
Calgary-East	8,759	53.37	7,654	46.63	16,413
Calgary-Edgemont	10,760	42.73	14,422	57.27	25,182
Calgary-Elbow	10,371	40.02	15,541	59.98	25,912
Calgary-Falconridge	6,593	43.56	8,543	56.44	15,136
Calgary-Fish Creek	12,772	48.52	13,550	51.48	26,322
Calgary-Foothills	12,432	45.48	14,902	54.52	27,334
Calgary-Glenmore	11,788	43.69	15,195	56.31	26,983
Calgary-Hays	13,204	52.21	12,086	47.79	25,290
Calgary-Klein	9,543	42.71	12,801	57.29	22,344
Calgary-Lougheed	10,747	51.24	10,225	48.76	20,972
Calgary-Bhullar-McCall	4,973	37.75	8,200	62.25	13,173
Calgary-Mountain View	8,805	30.89	19,701	69.11	28,506
Calgary-North	9,730	47.61	10,706	52.39	20,436
Calgary-North East	11,541	44.61	14,331	55.39	25,872
Calgary-North West	12,290	44.33	15,434	55.67	27,724
Calgary-Peigan	11,877	51.78	11,062	48.22	22,939
Calgary-Shaw	16,557	51.69	15,477	48.31	32,034
Calgary-South East	17,319	54.87	14,243	45.13	31,562
Calgary-Varsity	8,932	36.25	15,706	63.75	24,638
Calgary-West	11,919	48.28	12,768	51.72	24,687
Edmonton-Beverly-Clareview	8,477	47.60	9,330	52.40	17,807
Edmonton-Castle Downs	10,156	46.25	11,803	53.75	21,959
Edmonton-City Centre	5,770	31.14	12,757	68.86	18,527
Edmonton-Decore	8,432	46.91	9,542	53.09	17,974
Edmonton-Ellerslie	10,044	42.86	13,389	57.14	23,433
Edmonton-Glenora	7,229	33.90	14,095	66.10	21,324
Edmonton-Gold Bar	8,530	32.95	17,357	67.05	25,887
Edmonton-Highlands-Norwood	5,805	35.54	10,531	64.46	16,336
Edmonton-Manning	10,895	47.00	12,284	53.00	23,179
Edmonton-McClung	8,091	43.19	10,644	56.81	18,735
Edmonton-Meadows	8,872	42.10	12,201	57.90	21,073
Edmonton-Mill Woods	9,025	45.29	10,902	54.71	19,927
Edmonton-North West	8,871	43.05	11,736	56.95	20,607
Edmonton-Riverview	7,164	34.13	13,829	65.87	20,993
Edmonton-Rutherford	7,762	36.78	13,343	63.22	21,105
Edmonton-South	14,155	44.36	17,751	55.64	31,906
Edmonton-South West	16,530	46.90	18,713	53.10	35,243
Edmonton-Strathcona	5,206	24.66	15,908	75.34	21,114
Edmonton-West Henday	12,372	47.05	13,922	52.95	26,294
Edmonton-Whitemud	9,238	38.54	14,732	61.46	23,970
Airdrie-Cochrane	22,638	57.36	16,829	42.64	39,467
Airdrie-East	18,550	61.56	11,582	38.44	30,132
Athabasca-Barrhead-Westlock	16,111	69.74	6,990	30.26	23,101
Banff-Kananaskis	12,307	42.97	16,331	57.03	28,638
Bonnyville-Cold Lake-St. Paul	14,485	67.19	7,073	32.81	21,558
Brooks-Medicine Hat	14,274	65.01	7,681	34.99	21,955
Camrose	14,983	66.59	7,518	33.41	22,501
Cardston-Siksika	11,617	65.67	6,074	34.33	17,691
Central Peace-Notley	9,476	74.32	3,274	25.68	12,750
Chestermere-Strathmore	18,029	63.13	10,529	36.87	28,558
Cypress-Medicine Hat	14,912	60.51	9,732	39.49	24,644
Drayton Valley-Devon	18,469	72.44	7,025	27.56	25,494
Drumheller-Stettler	15,174	76.79	4,586	23.21	19,760
Fort McMurray-Lac La Biche	9,527	66.12	4,881	33.88	14,408
Fort McMurray-Wood Buffalo	8,957	68.63	4,095	31.37	13,052
Fort Saskatchewan-Vegreville	17,908	64.50	9,857	35.50	27,765
Grande Prairie	12,472	64.05	7,000	35.95	19,472
Grande Prairie-Wapiti	17,031	73.70	6,079	26.30	23,110
Highwood	19,781	63.28	11,480	36.72	31,261
Innisfail-Sylvan Lake	18,861	70.70	7,815	29.30	26,676
Lac Ste. Anne-Parkland	17,323	67.83	8,215	32.17	25,538
Lacombe-Ponoka	16,951	69.26	7,522	30.74	24,473
Leduc-Beaumont	17,918	60.54	11,679	39.46	29,597
Lesser Slave Lake	5,471	55.16	4,448	44.84	9,919
Lethbridge-East	11,773	48.58	12,459	51.42	24,232
Lethbridge-West	11,470	43.49	14,902	56.51	26,372
Livingstone-Macleod	17,705	64.06	9,931	35.94	27,636
Maskwacis-Wetaskiwin	13,459	62.85	7,955	37.15	21,414
Morinville-St. Albert	16,569	55.83	13,109	44.17	29,678
Olds-Didsbury-Three Hills	20,001	73.11	7,358	26.89	27,359
Peace River	8,751	59.89	5,862	40.11	14,613
Red Deer-North	12,657	61.48	7,930	38.52	20,587
Red Deer-South	15,066	58.14	10,846	41.86	25,912
Rimbey-Rocky Mountain House-Sundre	19,073	76.58	5,832	23.42	24,905
Sherwood Park	14,621	48.77	15,361	51.23	29,982
Spruce Grove-Stony Plain	17,916	58.45	12,735	41.55	30,651
St. Albert	13,020	43.51	16,906	56.49	29,926
Strathcona-Sherwood Park	16,364	56.91	12,391	43.09	28,755
Taber-Warner	13,344	72.75	4,998	27.25	18,342
Vermilion-Lloydminster-Wainwright	15,044	74.02	5,280	25.98	20,324
West Yellowhead	15,361	67.45	7,412	32.55	22,773
Total	1,078,681	52.46	977,384	47.54	2,056,065
Source: Elections Alberta

==== Question 3 ====
Assuming that all Canadian citizens and permanent residents continue to qualify for social support programs as they do now, do you support the Government of Alberta introducing a law requiring all individuals with a non-permanent legal immigration status to reside in Alberta for at least 12 months before qualifying for any provincially-funded social support programs?

Question 3
Choice	Votes	%
Yes	1,096,546	53.12
No	967,754	46.88
Total	2,064,300	100.00
Valid votes	2,064,300	93.24
Invalid/blank votes	149,760	6.76
Total votes	2,214,060	100.00
Registered voters/turnout	3,148,205	70.33
Source: Elections Alberta

Question 3 results by electoral district
Electoral district	Yes		No		Total
Electoral district	Votes	%	Votes	%	Total
Calgary-Acadia	11,119	46.31	12,892	53.69	24,011
Calgary-Beddington	10,311	45.81	12,199	54.19	22,510
Calgary-Bow	13,616	45.44	16,350	54.56	29,966
Calgary-Buffalo	9,146	37.73	15,092	62.27	24,238
Calgary-Cross	7,399	47.93	8,039	52.07	15,438
Calgary-Currie	9,518	38.26	15,359	61.74	24,877
Calgary-East	8,786	53.60	7,607	46.40	16,393
Calgary-Edgemont	10,995	43.38	14,353	56.62	25,348
Calgary-Elbow	10,780	40.27	15,991	59.73	26,771
Calgary-Falconridge	6,631	43.85	8,490	56.15	15,121
Calgary-Fish Creek	13,189	48.43	14,046	51.57	27,235
Calgary-Foothills	12,784	47.20	14,301	52.80	27,085
Calgary-Glenmore	12,061	45.25	14,592	54.75	26,653
Calgary-Hays	13,549	53.64	11,708	46.36	25,257
Calgary-Klein	9,764	43.62	12,618	56.38	22,382
Calgary-Lougheed	10,861	51.79	10,110	48.21	20,971
Calgary-Bhullar-McCall	5,016	38.19	8,117	61.81	13,133
Calgary-Mountain View	9,026	31.65	19,489	68.35	28,515
Calgary-North	9,843	48.17	10,593	51.83	20,436
Calgary-North East	11,569	44.93	14,179	55.07	25,748
Calgary-North West	12,552	45.15	15,250	54.85	27,802
Calgary-Peigan	12,287	52.32	11,198	47.68	23,485
Calgary-Shaw	16,821	51.97	15,546	48.03	32,367
Calgary-South East	17,731	55.25	14,362	44.75	32,093
Calgary-Varsity	8,495	36.59	14,721	63.41	23,216
Calgary-West	12,557	47.70	13,769	52.30	26,326
Edmonton-Beverly-Clareview	8,608	48.82	9,024	51.18	17,632
Edmonton-Castle Downs	10,374	47.20	11,607	52.80	21,981
Edmonton-City Centre	6,071	31.52	13,192	68.48	19,263
Edmonton-Decore	8,740	47.85	9,526	52.15	18,266
Edmonton-Ellerslie	10,334	43.98	13,161	56.02	23,495
Edmonton-Glenora	7,472	34.91	13,929	65.09	21,401
Edmonton-Gold Bar	8,715	33.61	17,211	66.39	25,926
Edmonton-Highlands-Norwood	5,994	36.46	10,446	63.54	16,440
Edmonton-Manning	10,829	48.65	11,430	51.35	22,259
Edmonton-McClung	8,318	44.20	10,499	55.80	18,817
Edmonton-Meadows	9,182	43.75	11,806	56.25	20,988
Edmonton-Mill Woods	9,371	46.50	10,782	53.50	20,153
Edmonton-North West	8,950	43.75	11,508	56.25	20,458
Edmonton-Riverview	7,753	34.07	15,006	65.93	22,759
Edmonton-Rutherford	8,134	36.39	14,221	63.61	22,355
Edmonton-South	14,507	45.68	17,248	54.32	31,755
Edmonton-South West	16,699	47.37	18,554	52.63	35,253
Edmonton-Strathcona	5,426	25.71	15,682	74.29	21,108
Edmonton-West Henday	12,629	47.86	13,760	52.14	26,389
Edmonton-Whitemud	9,360	39.31	14,452	60.69	23,812
Airdrie-Cochrane	22,994	57.70	16,859	42.30	39,853
Airdrie-East	18,756	62.27	11,365	37.73	30,121
Athabasca-Barrhead-Westlock	16,361	70.76	6,761	29.24	23,122
Banff-Kananaskis	12,551	43.75	16,136	56.25	28,687
Bonnyville-Cold Lake-St. Paul	14,751	68.46	6,796	31.54	21,547
Brooks-Medicine Hat	14,501	65.98	7,478	34.02	21,979
Camrose	15,016	67.03	7,387	32.97	22,403
Cardston-Siksika	11,606	65.67	6,066	34.33	17,672
Central Peace-Notley	9,579	75.05	3,184	24.95	12,763
Chestermere-Strathmore	18,084	63.50	10,395	36.50	28,479
Cypress-Medicine Hat	15,076	61.26	9,533	38.74	24,609
Drayton Valley-Devon	18,547	72.71	6,961	27.29	25,508
Drumheller-Stettler	15,294	77.35	4,479	22.65	19,773
Fort McMurray-Lac La Biche	9,627	66.66	4,815	33.34	14,442
Fort McMurray-Wood Buffalo	9,042	68.27	4,203	31.73	13,245
Fort Saskatchewan-Vegreville	17,998	65.05	9,671	34.95	27,669
Grande Prairie	12,676	65.16	6,778	34.84	19,454
Grande Prairie-Wapiti	17,095	73.92	6,030	26.08	23,125
Highwood	19,907	63.96	11,219	36.04	31,126
Innisfail-Sylvan Lake	18,969	71.65	7,505	28.35	26,474
Lac Ste. Anne-Parkland	17,569	68.80	7,969	31.20	25,538
Lacombe-Ponoka	17,229	70.22	7,307	29.78	24,536
Leduc-Beaumont	18,267	61.63	11,372	38.37	29,639
Lesser Slave Lake	5,475	55.16	4,450	44.84	9,925
Lethbridge-East	12,155	50.34	11,990	49.66	24,145
Lethbridge-West	11,801	44.73	14,583	55.27	26,384
Livingstone-Macleod	17,835	64.55	9,796	35.45	27,631
Maskwacis-Wetaskiwin	13,534	63.31	7,844	36.69	21,378
Morinville-St. Albert	16,509	55.86	13,045	44.14	29,554
Olds-Didsbury-Three Hills	20,195	73.77	7,179	26.23	27,374
Peace River	8,851	60.61	5,751	39.39	14,602
Red Deer-North	12,756	59.64	8,631	40.36	21,387
Red Deer-South	15,421	59.28	10,593	40.72	26,014
Rimbey-Rocky Mountain House-Sundre	18,906	76.65	5,760	23.35	24,666
Sherwood Park	14,927	49.79	15,052	50.21	29,979
Spruce Grove-Stony Plain	18,561	59.59	12,587	40.41	31,148
St. Albert	13,196	44.09	16,735	55.91	29,931
Strathcona-Sherwood Park	16,850	57.12	12,647	42.88	29,497
Taber-Warner	13,431	73.29	4,896	26.71	18,327
Vermilion-Lloydminster-Wainwright	15,001	75.09	4,976	24.91	19,977
West Yellowhead	15,775	69.40	6,955	30.60	22,730
Total	1,096,546	53.12	967,754	46.88	2,064,300
Source: Elections Alberta

==== Question 4 ====
Assuming that all Canadian citizens and permanent residents continue to qualify for public health care and education as they do now, do you support the Government of Alberta charging a reasonable fee or premium to individuals with a non-permanent immigration status living in Alberta for their and their family's use of the healthcare and education systems?

Question 4
Choice	Votes	%
Yes	1,067,383	51.78
No	994,065	48.22
Total	2,061,448	100.00
Valid votes	2,061,448	93.24
Invalid/blank votes	149,461	6.76
Total votes	2,210,909	100.00
Registered voters/turnout	3,148,205	70.23
Source: Elections Alberta

Question 4 results by electoral district
Electoral district	Yes		No		Total
Electoral district	Votes	%	Votes	%	Total
Calgary-Acadia	10,871	45.30	13,127	54.70	23,998
Calgary-Beddington	9,936	44.27	12,509	55.73	22,445
Calgary-Bow	13,420	44.62	16,658	55.38	30,078
Calgary-Buffalo	8,897	36.52	15,466	63.48	24,363
Calgary-Cross	6,982	45.29	8,434	54.71	15,416
Calgary-Currie	9,473	39.12	14,742	60.88	24,215
Calgary-East	8,295	50.49	8,135	49.51	16,430
Calgary-Edgemont	10,887	42.37	14,807	57.63	25,694
Calgary-Elbow	11,008	40.78	15,987	59.22	26,995
Calgary-Falconridge	6,144	40.63	8,978	59.37	15,122
Calgary-Fish Creek	13,008	48.23	13,965	51.77	26,973
Calgary-Foothills	12,182	44.39	15,262	55.61	27,444
Calgary-Glenmore	12,106	44.89	14,861	55.11	26,967
Calgary-Hays	13,109	51.29	12,451	48.71	25,560
Calgary-Klein	9,422	42.17	12,921	57.83	22,343
Calgary-Lougheed	10,450	49.01	10,872	50.99	21,322
Calgary-Bhullar-McCall	4,526	34.36	8,647	65.64	13,173
Calgary-Mountain View	9,002	31.41	19,658	68.59	28,660
Calgary-North	9,350	45.81	11,060	54.19	20,410
Calgary-North East	10,953	42.53	14,801	57.47	25,754
Calgary-North West	12,368	44.70	15,300	55.30	27,668
Calgary-Peigan	12,052	50.96	11,596	49.04	23,648
Calgary-Shaw	16,070	50.42	15,805	49.58	31,875
Calgary-South East	17,257	53.76	14,842	46.24	32,099
Calgary-Varsity	9,093	36.25	15,991	63.75	25,084
Calgary-West	12,090	48.01	13,091	51.99	25,181
Edmonton-Beverly-Clareview	8,174	46.01	9,590	53.99	17,764
Edmonton-Castle Downs	9,701	44.32	12,189	55.68	21,890
Edmonton-City Centre	7,763	39.24	12,018	60.76	19,781
Edmonton-Decore	8,231	44.91	10,096	55.09	18,327
Edmonton-Ellerslie	9,569	40.77	13,899	59.23	23,468
Edmonton-Glenora	7,101	33.12	14,338	66.88	21,439
Edmonton-Gold Bar	8,500	33.17	17,125	66.83	25,625
Edmonton-Highlands-Norwood	5,591	34.11	10,799	65.89	16,390
Edmonton-Manning	10,418	44.86	12,806	55.14	23,224
Edmonton-McClung	7,916	42.16	10,862	57.84	18,778
Edmonton-Meadows	8,519	41.20	12,159	58.80	20,678
Edmonton-Mill Woods	9,108	44.57	11,328	55.43	20,436
Edmonton-North West	8,257	42.24	11,291	57.76	19,548
Edmonton-Riverview	8,467	37.68	14,003	62.32	22,470
Edmonton-Rutherford	8,254	40.24	12,259	59.76	20,513
Edmonton-South	13,731	43.23	18,034	56.77	31,765
Edmonton-South West	16,048	45.59	19,149	54.41	35,197
Edmonton-Strathcona	5,194	24.50	16,010	75.50	21,204
Edmonton-West Henday	11,950	45.57	14,271	54.43	26,221
Edmonton-Whitemud	9,188	38.42	14,726	61.58	23,914
Airdrie-Cochrane	22,490	57.77	16,443	42.23	38,933
Airdrie-East	18,342	60.86	11,796	39.14	30,138
Athabasca-Barrhead-Westlock	15,980	69.20	7,113	30.80	23,093
Banff-Kananaskis	12,539	43.65	16,189	56.35	28,728
Bonnyville-Cold Lake-St. Paul	14,174	65.62	7,427	34.38	21,601
Brooks-Medicine Hat	13,922	63.59	7,970	36.41	21,892
Camrose	14,716	65.66	7,695	34.34	22,411
Cardston-Siksika	11,391	64.38	6,303	35.62	17,694
Central Peace-Notley	9,229	72.53	3,496	27.47	12,725
Chestermere-Strathmore	17,764	62.40	10,703	37.60	28,467
Cypress-Medicine Hat	14,862	59.62	10,065	40.38	24,927
Drayton Valley-Devon	18,311	71.76	7,206	28.24	25,517
Drumheller-Stettler	15,070	76.27	4,690	23.73	19,760
Fort McMurray-Lac La Biche	9,161	63.68	5,224	36.32	14,385
Fort McMurray-Wood Buffalo	8,109	66.61	4,064	33.39	12,173
Fort Saskatchewan-Vegreville	17,682	63.49	10,166	36.51	27,848
Grande Prairie	12,256	62.99	7,202	37.01	19,458
Grande Prairie-Wapiti	16,641	72.37	6,353	27.63	22,994
Highwood	19,505	62.44	11,734	37.56	31,239
Innisfail-Sylvan Lake	18,364	69.80	7,947	30.20	26,311
Lac Ste. Anne-Parkland	17,167	67.75	8,171	32.25	25,338
Lacombe-Ponoka	16,827	68.45	7,756	31.55	24,583
Leduc-Beaumont	17,754	59.98	11,845	40.02	29,599
Lesser Slave Lake	5,230	52.66	4,702	47.34	9,932
Lethbridge-East	11,595	47.98	12,569	52.02	24,164
Lethbridge-West	11,225	42.54	15,164	57.46	26,389
Livingstone-Macleod	17,559	63.31	10,178	36.69	27,737
Maskwacis-Wetaskiwin	13,288	62.05	8,127	37.95	21,415
Morinville-St. Albert	16,541	55.61	13,204	44.39	29,745
Olds-Didsbury-Three Hills	19,948	72.96	7,393	27.04	27,341
Peace River	8,632	60.46	5,645	39.54	14,277
Red Deer-North	12,441	57.11	9,344	42.89	21,785
Red Deer-South	14,973	56.51	11,525	43.49	26,498
Rimbey-Rocky Mountain House-Sundre	18,551	75.94	5,879	24.06	24,430
Sherwood Park	14,687	48.85	15,377	51.15	30,064
Spruce Grove-Stony Plain	17,813	57.80	13,003	42.20	30,816
St. Albert	12,908	43.35	16,865	56.65	29,773
Strathcona-Sherwood Park	16,706	56.54	12,839	43.46	29,545
Taber-Warner	13,178	71.70	5,202	28.30	18,380
Vermilion-Lloydminster-Wainwright	14,738	72.71	5,532	27.29	20,270
West Yellowhead	14,483	67.29	7,041	32.71	21,524
Total	1,067,383	51.78	994,065	48.22	2,061,448
Source: Elections Alberta

==== Question 5 ====
Do you support the Government of Alberta introducing a law requiring individuals to provide proof of citizenship, such as a passport, birth certificate, or citizenship card, to vote in an Alberta provincial election?

Question 5
Choice	Votes	%
Yes	1,200,838	58.06
No	867,525	41.94
Total	2,068,363	100.00
Valid votes	2,068,363	93.29
Invalid/blank votes	148,711	6.71
Total votes	2,217,074	100.00
Registered voters/turnout	3,148,205	70.42
Source: Elections Alberta

Question 5 results by electoral district
Electoral district	Yes		No		Total
Electoral district	Votes	%	Votes	%	Total
Calgary-Acadia	12,317	51.69	11,510	48.31	23,827
Calgary-Beddington	11,128	50.00	11,128	50.00	22,256
Calgary-Bow	15,379	52.19	14,087	47.81	29,466
Calgary-Buffalo	10,506	43.20	13,814	56.80	24,320
Calgary-Cross	8,102	52.49	7,332	47.51	15,434
Calgary-Currie	11,087	44.41	13,878	55.59	24,965
Calgary-East	9,502	57.90	6,908	42.10	16,410
Calgary-Edgemont	12,396	48.82	12,995	51.18	25,391
Calgary-Elbow	12,205	47.19	13,660	52.81	25,865
Calgary-Falconridge	7,390	48.82	7,746	51.18	15,136
Calgary-Fish Creek	14,547	53.78	12,500	46.22	27,047
Calgary-Foothills	14,020	51.04	13,447	48.96	27,467
Calgary-Glenmore	13,861	50.97	13,334	49.03	27,195
Calgary-Hays	14,896	58.89	10,399	41.11	25,295
Calgary-Klein	10,694	47.92	11,623	52.08	22,317
Calgary-Lougheed	11,916	56.99	8,993	43.01	20,909
Calgary-Bhullar-McCall	5,694	43.22	7,479	56.78	13,173
Calgary-Mountain View	10,542	37.05	17,913	62.95	28,455
Calgary-North	10,698	52.41	9,713	47.59	20,411
Calgary-North East	13,088	50.58	12,787	49.42	25,875
Calgary-North West	14,020	50.41	13,791	49.59	27,811
Calgary-Peigan	13,212	56.70	10,088	43.30	23,300
Calgary-Shaw	18,401	57.28	13,723	42.72	32,124
Calgary-South East	19,556	60.84	12,585	39.16	32,141
Calgary-Varsity	10,609	42.20	14,532	57.80	25,141
Calgary-West	13,811	54.70	11,437	45.30	25,248
Edmonton-Beverly-Clareview	9,376	52.91	8,345	47.09	17,721
Edmonton-Castle Downs	10,230	46.81	11,622	53.19	21,852
Edmonton-City Centre	7,011	35.34	12,829	64.66	19,840
Edmonton-Decore	9,231	51.29	8,767	48.71	17,998
Edmonton-Ellerslie	11,477	48.88	12,001	51.12	23,478
Edmonton-Glenora	8,464	39.31	13,066	60.69	21,530
Edmonton-Gold Bar	10,042	38.49	16,050	61.51	26,092
Edmonton-Highlands-Norwood	6,724	41.01	9,672	58.99	16,396
Edmonton-Manning	12,264	52.69	11,011	47.31	23,275
Edmonton-McClung	9,292	49.42	9,509	50.58	18,801
Edmonton-Meadows	9,932	47.27	11,078	52.73	21,010
Edmonton-Mill Woods	10,475	51.24	9,967	48.76	20,442
Edmonton-North West	10,067	49.54	10,253	50.46	20,320
Edmonton-Riverview	8,877	39.06	13,852	60.94	22,729
Edmonton-Rutherford	9,270	41.18	13,239	58.82	22,509
Edmonton-South	17,160	52.72	15,390	47.28	32,550
Edmonton-South West	18,423	52.34	16,774	47.66	35,197
Edmonton-Strathcona	6,455	30.53	14,688	69.47	21,143
Edmonton-West Henday	13,889	52.54	12,545	47.46	26,434
Edmonton-Whitemud	10,433	43.65	13,471	56.35	23,904
Airdrie-Cochrane	24,820	64.25	13,812	35.75	38,632
Airdrie-East	20,164	66.86	9,996	33.14	30,160
Athabasca-Barrhead-Westlock	17,359	74.67	5,890	25.33	23,249
Banff-Kananaskis	14,180	49.37	14,539	50.63	28,719
Bonnyville-Cold Lake-St. Paul	15,435	71.92	6,026	28.08	21,461
Brooks-Medicine Hat	15,561	70.95	6,370	29.05	21,931
Camrose	16,027	71.57	6,367	28.43	22,394
Cardston-Siksika	12,359	69.97	5,304	30.03	17,663
Central Peace-Notley	10,053	78.71	2,719	21.29	12,772
Chestermere-Strathmore	19,585	68.96	8,815	31.04	28,400
Cypress-Medicine Hat	16,347	66.33	8,298	33.67	24,645
Drayton Valley-Devon	19,527	76.54	5,984	23.46	25,511
Drumheller-Stettler	16,041	81.09	3,741	18.91	19,782
Fort McMurray-Lac La Biche	10,358	71.92	4,045	28.08	14,403
Fort McMurray-Wood Buffalo	11,417	77.50	3,315	22.50	14,732
Fort Saskatchewan-Vegreville	19,299	69.54	8,453	30.46	27,752
Grande Prairie	13,517	70.53	5,647	29.47	19,164
Grande Prairie-Wapiti	18,117	78.51	4,958	21.49	23,075
Highwood	21,397	68.30	9,931	31.70	31,328
Innisfail-Sylvan Lake	20,316	75.58	6,564	24.42	26,880
Lac Ste. Anne-Parkland	18,627	72.66	7,010	27.34	25,637
Lacombe-Ponoka	18,272	74.68	6,196	25.32	24,468
Leduc-Beaumont	19,594	65.67	10,244	34.33	29,838
Lesser Slave Lake	5,965	59.92	3,990	40.08	9,955
Lethbridge-East	13,545	55.78	10,740	44.22	24,285
Lethbridge-West	13,365	50.57	13,063	49.43	26,428
Livingstone-Macleod	19,241	69.64	8,390	30.36	27,631
Maskwacis-Wetaskiwin	14,423	67.41	6,973	32.59	21,396
Morinville-St. Albert	18,317	61.68	11,381	38.32	29,698
Olds-Didsbury-Three Hills	21,339	77.59	6,164	22.41	27,503
Peace River	9,410	64.36	5,210	35.64	14,620
Red Deer-North	14,066	65.93	7,269	34.07	21,335
Red Deer-South	17,009	64.07	9,540	35.93	26,549
Rimbey-Rocky Mountain House-Sundre	20,148	81.51	4,570	18.49	24,718
Sherwood Park	16,680	55.63	13,303	44.37	29,983
Spruce Grove-Stony Plain	19,968	64.20	11,136	35.80	31,104
St. Albert	14,908	49.91	14,963	50.09	29,871
Strathcona-Sherwood Park	18,442	62.40	11,114	37.60	29,556
Taber-Warner	14,333	78.08	4,024	21.92	18,357
Vermilion-Lloydminster-Wainwright	16,033	79.17	4,219	20.83	20,252
West Yellowhead	16,605	74.38	5,721	25.62	22,326
Total	1,200,838	58.06	867,525	41.94	2,068,363
Source: Elections Alberta

=== Constitutional questions ===
==== Question 6 ====
Do you support the Government of Alberta working with the governments of other willing provinces to amend the Canadian Constitution to have provincial governments, and not the federal government, select the justices appointed to provincial King's Bench and Appeal courts?

Question 6
Choice	Votes	%
Yes	933,310	45.36
No	1,124,131	54.64
Total	2,057,441	100.00
Valid votes	2,057,441	92.94
Invalid/blank votes	156,208	7.06
Total votes	2,213,649	100.00
Registered voters/turnout	3,148,205	70.31
Source: Elections Alberta

Question 6 results by electoral district
Electoral district	Yes		No		Total
Electoral district	Votes	%	Votes	%	Total
Calgary-Acadia	9,349	39.72	14,191	60.28	23,540
Calgary-Beddington	8,140	37.02	13,849	62.98	21,989
Calgary-Bow	11,360	37.81	18,681	62.19	30,041
Calgary-Buffalo	7,300	30.13	16,926	69.87	24,226
Calgary-Cross	5,734	37.27	9,651	62.73	15,385
Calgary-Currie	8,127	31.35	17,794	68.65	25,921
Calgary-East	7,043	43.04	9,321	56.96	16,364
Calgary-Edgemont	8,972	35.48	16,317	64.52	25,289
Calgary-Elbow	9,242	34.40	17,622	65.60	26,864
Calgary-Falconridge	4,965	32.90	10,125	67.10	15,090
Calgary-Fish Creek	11,436	42.29	15,608	57.71	27,044
Calgary-Foothills	9,979	38.13	16,190	61.87	26,169
Calgary-Glenmore	10,401	38.50	16,616	61.50	27,017
Calgary-Hays	11,186	44.77	13,801	55.23	24,987
Calgary-Klein	8,045	35.92	14,352	64.08	22,397
Calgary-Lougheed	9,095	43.74	11,698	56.26	20,793
Calgary-Bhullar-McCall	3,462	26.39	9,658	73.61	13,120
Calgary-Mountain View	7,322	25.75	21,108	74.25	28,430
Calgary-North	7,438	36.60	12,886	63.40	20,324
Calgary-North East	8,925	34.57	16,895	65.43	25,820
Calgary-North West	10,225	37.01	17,403	62.99	27,628
Calgary-Peigan	10,244	43.38	13,370	56.62	23,614
Calgary-Shaw	13,765	43.10	18,171	56.90	31,936
Calgary-South East	14,669	46.72	16,728	53.28	31,397
Calgary-Varsity	7,651	30.75	17,231	69.25	24,882
Calgary-West	10,285	40.89	14,868	59.11	25,153
Edmonton-Beverly-Clareview	7,870	44.76	9,711	55.24	17,581
Edmonton-Castle Downs	7,727	35.35	14,133	64.65	21,860
Edmonton-City Centre	4,482	22.67	15,287	77.33	19,769
Edmonton-Decore	6,927	37.96	11,320	62.04	18,247
Edmonton-Ellerslie	7,579	32.27	15,910	67.73	23,489
Edmonton-Glenora	5,747	27.15	15,423	72.85	21,170
Edmonton-Gold Bar	6,892	26.75	18,868	73.25	25,760
Edmonton-Highlands-Norwood	4,564	27.93	11,779	72.07	16,343
Edmonton-Manning	8,466	36.50	14,726	63.50	23,192
Edmonton-McClung	6,489	34.84	12,134	65.16	18,623
Edmonton-Meadows	6,545	31.38	14,314	68.62	20,859
Edmonton-Mill Woods	7,401	36.02	13,146	63.98	20,547
Edmonton-North West	6,600	32.38	13,780	67.62	20,380
Edmonton-Riverview	5,989	27.55	15,747	72.45	21,736
Edmonton-Rutherford	6,206	28.03	15,933	71.97	22,139
Edmonton-South	10,745	34.22	20,658	65.78	31,403
Edmonton-South West	12,812	36.64	22,151	63.36	34,963
Edmonton-Strathcona	4,086	19.50	16,870	80.50	20,956
Edmonton-West Henday	9,677	36.89	16,554	63.11	26,231
Edmonton-Whitemud	7,065	29.72	16,705	70.28	23,770
Airdrie-Cochrane	19,630	51.27	18,661	48.73	38,291
Airdrie-East	15,825	52.46	14,340	47.54	30,165
Athabasca-Barrhead-Westlock	14,800	64.55	8,127	35.45	22,927
Banff-Kananaskis	10,736	37.96	17,546	62.04	28,282
Bonnyville-Cold Lake-St. Paul	12,922	60.73	8,355	39.27	21,277
Brooks-Medicine Hat	12,967	58.13	9,338	41.87	22,305
Camrose	13,583	60.99	8,687	39.01	22,270
Cardston-Siksika	10,947	62.03	6,700	37.97	17,647
Central Peace-Notley	8,924	70.42	3,748	29.58	12,672
Chestermere-Strathmore	15,373	55.06	12,546	44.94	27,919
Cypress-Medicine Hat	13,291	54.24	11,215	45.76	24,506
Drayton Valley-Devon	17,063	67.19	8,334	32.81	25,397
Drumheller-Stettler	14,450	73.50	5,211	26.50	19,661
Fort McMurray-Lac La Biche	8,633	60.34	5,674	39.66	14,307
Fort McMurray-Wood Buffalo	9,571	65.96	4,939	34.04	14,510
Fort Saskatchewan-Vegreville	15,716	56.99	11,863	43.01	27,579
Grande Prairie	11,513	59.57	7,813	40.43	19,326
Grande Prairie-Wapiti	16,007	69.74	6,945	30.26	22,952
Highwood	18,198	58.20	13,069	41.80	31,267
Innisfail-Sylvan Lake	17,248	66.18	8,815	33.82	26,063
Lac Ste. Anne-Parkland	15,864	61.29	10,018	38.71	25,882
Lacombe-Ponoka	15,709	64.74	8,554	35.26	24,263
Leduc-Beaumont	15,178	51.25	14,438	48.75	29,616
Lesser Slave Lake	4,846	49.10	5,024	50.90	9,870
Lethbridge-East	10,135	42.10	13,940	57.90	24,075
Lethbridge-West	10,162	38.63	16,147	61.37	26,309
Livingstone-Macleod	16,231	59.05	11,255	40.95	27,486
Maskwacis-Wetaskiwin	11,986	56.39	9,268	43.61	21,254
Morinville-St. Albert	13,876	47.27	15,479	52.73	29,355
Olds-Didsbury-Three Hills	18,677	68.51	8,584	31.49	27,261
Peace River	8,143	55.97	6,405	44.03	14,548
Red Deer-North	11,219	52.81	10,025	47.19	21,244
Red Deer-South	13,493	51.22	12,848	48.78	26,341
Rimbey-Rocky Mountain House-Sundre	19,075	74.54	6,514	25.46	25,589
Sherwood Park	12,182	40.87	17,626	59.13	29,808
Spruce Grove-Stony Plain	15,553	50.41	15,297	49.59	30,850
St. Albert	10,369	35.01	19,247	64.99	29,616
Strathcona-Sherwood Park	14,294	48.49	15,186	51.51	29,480
Taber-Warner	12,624	69.20	5,620	30.80	18,244
Vermilion-Lloydminster-Wainwright	14,029	69.82	6,065	30.18	20,094
West Yellowhead	14,039	62.41	8,456	37.59	22,495
Total	933,310	45.36	1,124,131	54.64	2,057,441
Source: Elections Alberta

==== Question 7 ====
Do you support the Government of Alberta working with the governments of other willing provinces to amend the Canadian Constitution to abolish the unelected federal Senate?

Question 7
Choice	Votes	%
Yes	971,837	47.28
No	1,083,780	52.72
Total	2,055,617	100.00
Valid votes	2,055,617	92.82
Invalid/blank votes	159,089	7.18
Total votes	2,214,706	100.00
Registered voters/turnout	3,148,205	70.35
Source: Elections Alberta

Question 7 results by electoral district
Electoral district	Yes		No		Total
Electoral district	Votes	%	Votes	%	Total
Calgary-Acadia	9,817	41.41	13,889	58.59	23,706
Calgary-Beddington	8,766	38.46	14,024	61.54	22,790
Calgary-Bow	12,295	41.22	17,530	58.78	29,825
Calgary-Buffalo	8,009	32.93	16,315	67.07	24,324
Calgary-Cross	6,171	40.19	9,185	59.81	15,356
Calgary-Currie	8,370	33.57	16,565	66.43	24,935
Calgary-East	7,320	44.79	9,023	55.21	16,343
Calgary-Edgemont	9,690	38.47	15,501	61.53	25,191
Calgary-Elbow	9,885	36.61	17,119	63.39	27,004
Calgary-Falconridge	5,267	35.00	9,781	65.00	15,048
Calgary-Fish Creek	11,990	44.22	15,126	55.78	27,116
Calgary-Foothills	10,466	38.67	16,601	61.33	27,067
Calgary-Glenmore	10,975	40.54	16,096	59.46	27,071
Calgary-Hays	11,811	45.75	14,003	54.25	25,814
Calgary-Klein	8,503	38.20	13,755	61.80	22,258
Calgary-Lougheed	9,580	45.88	11,302	54.12	20,882
Calgary-Bhullar-McCall	3,701	28.23	9,411	71.77	13,112
Calgary-Mountain View	8,017	28.22	20,395	71.78	28,412
Calgary-North	7,990	39.37	12,305	60.63	20,295
Calgary-North East	9,367	36.33	16,415	63.67	25,782
Calgary-North West	10,842	39.42	16,659	60.58	27,501
Calgary-Peigan	10,576	45.23	12,808	54.77	23,384
Calgary-Shaw	14,523	45.52	17,385	54.48	31,908
Calgary-South East	15,716	49.08	16,307	50.92	32,023
Calgary-Varsity	8,270	33.03	16,767	66.97	25,037
Calgary-West	11,128	44.30	13,991	55.70	25,119
Edmonton-Beverly-Clareview	6,968	39.58	10,635	60.42	17,603
Edmonton-Castle Downs	8,294	37.93	13,571	62.07	21,865
Edmonton-City Centre	5,002	25.52	14,595	74.48	19,597
Edmonton-Decore	7,042	38.84	11,091	61.16	18,133
Edmonton-Ellerslie	8,043	34.38	15,350	65.62	23,393
Edmonton-Glenora	6,103	29.61	14,510	70.39	20,613
Edmonton-Gold Bar	7,467	29.29	18,030	70.71	25,497
Edmonton-Highlands-Norwood	4,938	30.55	11,224	69.45	16,162
Edmonton-Manning	8,978	38.95	14,073	61.05	23,051
Edmonton-McClung	6,968	37.34	11,691	62.66	18,659
Edmonton-Meadows	7,087	33.88	13,832	66.12	20,919
Edmonton-Mill Woods	7,675	37.69	12,686	62.31	20,361
Edmonton-North West	7,486	37.05	12,720	62.95	20,206
Edmonton-Riverview	6,592	29.02	16,124	70.98	22,716
Edmonton-Rutherford	7,108	31.85	15,206	68.15	22,314
Edmonton-South	11,758	36.85	20,152	63.15	31,910
Edmonton-South West	13,652	38.82	21,511	61.18	35,163
Edmonton-Strathcona	4,591	22.04	16,238	77.96	20,829
Edmonton-West Henday	10,915	39.92	16,430	60.08	27,345
Edmonton-Whitemud	7,334	33.03	14,867	66.97	22,201
Airdrie-Cochrane	20,666	53.00	18,330	47.00	38,996
Airdrie-East	16,237	54.43	13,596	45.57	29,833
Athabasca-Barrhead-Westlock	15,137	66.00	7,797	34.00	22,934
Banff-Kananaskis	11,460	40.11	17,112	59.89	28,572
Bonnyville-Cold Lake-St. Paul	13,392	62.49	8,040	37.51	21,432
Brooks-Medicine Hat	13,420	60.99	8,582	39.01	22,002
Camrose	14,061	63.05	8,240	36.95	22,301
Cardston-Siksika	10,994	62.37	6,633	37.63	17,627
Central Peace-Notley	9,105	71.95	3,550	28.05	12,655
Chestermere-Strathmore	15,762	56.08	12,346	43.92	28,108
Cypress-Medicine Hat	13,718	55.92	10,815	44.08	24,533
Drayton Valley-Devon	17,405	68.58	7,973	31.42	25,378
Drumheller-Stettler	14,530	73.94	5,122	26.06	19,652
Fort McMurray-Lac La Biche	8,695	60.85	5,595	39.15	14,290
Fort McMurray-Wood Buffalo	8,854	65.22	4,721	34.78	13,575
Fort Saskatchewan-Vegreville	16,017	59.48	10,913	40.52	26,930
Grande Prairie	11,887	61.38	7,479	38.62	19,366
Grande Prairie-Wapiti	16,462	70.70	6,823	29.30	23,285
Highwood	18,594	59.90	12,446	40.10	31,040
Innisfail-Sylvan Lake	17,664	66.95	8,721	33.05	26,385
Lac Ste. Anne-Parkland	16,307	64.22	9,084	35.78	25,391
Lacombe-Ponoka	15,973	66.04	8,215	33.96	24,188
Leduc-Beaumont	15,834	53.71	13,646	46.29	29,480
Lesser Slave Lake	4,873	49.30	5,011	50.70	9,884
Lethbridge-East	10,396	43.87	13,299	56.13	23,695
Lethbridge-West	10,296	39.29	15,907	60.71	26,203
Livingstone-Macleod	16,421	60.07	10,916	39.93	27,337
Maskwacis-Wetaskiwin	12,335	58.03	8,921	41.97	21,256
Morinville-St. Albert	14,688	49.84	14,783	50.16	29,471
Olds-Didsbury-Three Hills	18,896	69.80	8,174	30.20	27,070
Peace River	8,267	56.76	6,297	43.24	14,564
Red Deer-North	11,595	54.79	9,566	45.21	21,161
Red Deer-South	14,302	54.13	12,119	45.87	26,421
Rimbey-Rocky Mountain House-Sundre	18,392	75.00	6,130	25.00	24,522
Sherwood Park	12,726	43.01	16,861	56.99	29,587
Spruce Grove-Stony Plain	16,143	52.74	14,463	47.26	30,606
St. Albert	11,113	37.32	18,666	62.68	29,779
Strathcona-Sherwood Park	14,893	50.71	14,478	49.29	29,371
Taber-Warner	12,761	70.10	5,443	29.90	18,204
Vermilion-Lloydminster-Wainwright	14,108	70.19	5,991	29.81	20,099
West Yellowhead	14,363	64.01	8,075	35.99	22,438
Total	971,788	47.28	1,083,673	52.72	2,055,461
Source: Elections Alberta

==== Question 8 ====
Do you support the Government of Alberta working with the governments of other willing provinces to amend the Canadian Constitution to allow provinces to opt out of federal programs that intrude on provincial jurisdiction such as health care, education, and social services, without a province losing any of the associated federal funding for use in its social programs?

Question 8
Choice	Votes	%
Yes	873,059	42.44
No	1,183,982	57.56
Total	2,057,041	100.00
Valid votes	2,057,041	93.01
Invalid/blank votes	154,659	6.99
Total votes	2,211,700	100.00
Registered voters/turnout	3,148,205	70.25
Source: Elections Alberta

Question 8 results by electoral district
Electoral district	Yes		No		Total
Electoral district	Votes	%	Votes	%	Total
Calgary-Acadia	8,480	35.70	15,271	64.30	23,751
Calgary-Beddington	7,543	33.89	14,715	66.11	22,258
Calgary-Bow	10,496	34.74	19,718	65.26	30,214
Calgary-Buffalo	6,646	27.45	17,565	72.55	24,211
Calgary-Cross	5,388	35.11	9,959	64.89	15,347
Calgary-Currie	7,597	30.41	17,381	69.59	24,978
Calgary-East	6,597	40.29	9,776	59.71	16,373
Calgary-Edgemont	8,300	33.15	16,741	66.85	25,041
Calgary-Elbow	8,529	32.09	18,049	67.91	26,578
Calgary-Falconridge	4,696	31.10	10,403	68.90	15,099
Calgary-Fish Creek	10,395	38.01	16,952	61.99	27,347
Calgary-Foothills	9,590	34.96	17,845	65.04	27,435
Calgary-Glenmore	9,342	34.91	17,415	65.09	26,757
Calgary-Hays	10,502	42.20	14,383	57.80	24,885
Calgary-Klein	7,368	33.03	14,939	66.97	22,307
Calgary-Lougheed	8,560	40.87	12,382	59.13	20,942
Calgary-Bhullar-McCall	3,370	25.64	9,775	74.36	13,145
Calgary-Mountain View	6,913	24.40	21,416	75.60	28,329
Calgary-North	7,158	36.42	12,495	63.58	19,653
Calgary-North East	8,276	32.11	17,497	67.89	25,773
Calgary-North West	9,424	34.05	18,256	65.95	27,680
Calgary-Peigan	9,332	40.05	13,969	59.95	23,301
Calgary-Shaw	13,130	41.19	18,745	58.81	31,875
Calgary-South East	13,953	44.00	17,760	56.00	31,713
Calgary-Varsity	6,825	27.17	18,291	72.83	25,116
Calgary-West	9,497	37.75	15,660	62.25	25,157
Edmonton-Beverly-Clareview	6,137	35.03	11,380	64.97	17,517
Edmonton-Castle Downs	8,087	36.93	13,812	63.07	21,899
Edmonton-City Centre	4,064	20.59	15,671	79.41	19,735
Edmonton-Decore	6,228	34.04	12,069	65.96	18,297
Edmonton-Ellerslie	7,163	30.55	16,280	69.45	23,443
Edmonton-Glenora	5,097	23.97	16,170	76.03	21,267
Edmonton-Gold Bar	6,278	24.52	19,324	75.48	25,602
Edmonton-Highlands-Norwood	4,133	25.31	12,199	74.69	16,332
Edmonton-Manning	7,978	34.36	15,244	65.64	23,222
Edmonton-McClung	5,958	31.65	12,868	68.35	18,826
Edmonton-Meadows	6,171	29.47	14,768	70.53	20,939
Edmonton-Mill Woods	6,790	35.66	12,252	64.34	19,042
Edmonton-North West	6,214	30.37	14,247	69.63	20,461
Edmonton-Riverview	5,349	23.05	17,856	76.95	23,205
Edmonton-Rutherford	5,702	25.56	16,608	74.44	22,310
Edmonton-South	10,142	31.88	21,669	68.12	31,811
Edmonton-South West	12,193	34.51	23,140	65.49	35,333
Edmonton-Strathcona	3,625	17.21	17,437	82.79	21,062
Edmonton-West Henday	9,141	34.49	17,360	65.51	26,501
Edmonton-Whitemud	6,472	27.07	17,440	72.93	23,912
Airdrie-Cochrane	18,909	47.77	20,671	52.23	39,580
Airdrie-East	14,697	49.56	14,959	50.44	29,656
Athabasca-Barrhead-Westlock	14,057	61.08	8,956	38.92	23,013
Banff-Kananaskis	10,338	34.93	19,261	65.07	29,599
Bonnyville-Cold Lake-St. Paul	12,555	58.47	8,919	41.53	21,474
Brooks-Medicine Hat	12,246	56.05	9,604	43.95	21,850
Camrose	12,879	57.49	9,525	42.51	22,404
Cardston-Siksika	10,485	59.42	7,161	40.58	17,646
Central Peace-Notley	8,585	67.44	4,144	32.56	12,729
Chestermere-Strathmore	14,452	50.84	13,977	49.16	28,429
Cypress-Medicine Hat	12,423	50.69	12,083	49.31	24,506
Drayton Valley-Devon	16,390	64.48	9,029	35.52	25,419
Drumheller-Stettler	13,619	69.29	6,036	30.71	19,655
Fort McMurray-Lac La Biche	8,217	57.37	6,106	42.63	14,323
Fort McMurray-Wood Buffalo	8,692	63.10	5,084	36.90	13,776
Fort Saskatchewan-Vegreville	14,788	52.86	13,190	47.14	27,978
Grande Prairie	10,896	56.36	8,436	43.64	19,332
Grande Prairie-Wapiti	15,321	67.89	7,246	32.11	22,567
Highwood	16,864	54.19	14,254	45.81	31,118
Innisfail-Sylvan Lake	16,525	62.33	9,988	37.67	26,513
Lac Ste. Anne-Parkland	14,758	58.89	10,301	41.11	25,059
Lacombe-Ponoka	14,962	61.98	9,177	38.02	24,139
Leduc-Beaumont	14,339	48.27	15,368	51.73	29,707
Lesser Slave Lake	4,557	46.04	5,340	53.96	9,897
Lethbridge-East	9,232	39.49	14,147	60.51	23,379
Lethbridge-West	8,912	35.23	16,388	64.77	25,300
Livingstone-Macleod	15,167	55.26	12,278	44.74	27,445
Maskwacis-Wetaskiwin	11,399	53.49	9,913	46.51	21,312
Morinville-St. Albert	12,900	43.79	16,557	56.21	29,457
Olds-Didsbury-Three Hills	17,699	65.05	9,509	34.95	27,208
Peace River	7,890	54.31	6,638	45.69	14,528
Red Deer-North	10,512	49.49	10,727	50.51	21,239
Red Deer-South	12,702	48.03	13,746	51.97	26,448
Rimbey-Rocky Mountain House-Sundre	17,036	69.33	7,537	30.67	24,573
Sherwood Park	10,952	36.71	18,883	63.29	29,835
Spruce Grove-Stony Plain	14,103	47.58	15,535	52.42	29,638
St. Albert	9,604	32.12	20,299	67.88	29,903
Strathcona-Sherwood Park	13,131	44.61	16,305	55.39	29,436
Taber-Warner	12,016	65.73	6,265	34.27	18,281
Vermilion-Lloydminster-Wainwright	13,909	69.03	6,239	30.97	20,148
West Yellowhead	13,512	59.89	9,049	40.11	22,561
Total	873,059	42.44	1,183,982	57.56	2,057,041
Source: Elections Alberta

==== Question 9 ====
Do you support the Government of Alberta working with the governments of other willing provinces to amend the Canadian Constitution to better protect provincial rights from federal interference by giving a province's laws dealing with provincial or shared areas of constitutional jurisdiction priority over federal laws when the province's laws and federal laws conflict?

Question 9
Choice	Votes	%
Yes	908,729	44.17
No	1,148,744	55.83
Total	2,057,473	100.00
Valid votes	2,057,473	92.95
Invalid/blank votes	156,047	7.05
Total votes	2,213,520	100.00
Registered voters/turnout	3,148,205	70.31
Source: Elections Alberta

Question 9 results by electoral district
Electoral district	Yes		No		Total
Electoral district	Votes	%	Votes	%	Total
Calgary-Acadia	8,894	37.29	14,956	62.71	23,850
Calgary-Beddington	7,995	35.23	14,696	64.77	22,691
Calgary-Bow	10,564	36.50	18,377	63.50	28,941
Calgary-Buffalo	6,962	28.73	17,273	71.27	24,235
Calgary-Cross	5,806	37.81	9,550	62.19	15,356
Calgary-Currie	7,551	30.98	16,823	69.02	24,374
Calgary-East	7,047	43.04	9,325	56.96	16,372
Calgary-Edgemont	8,643	34.14	16,674	65.86	25,317
Calgary-Elbow	8,836	33.07	17,881	66.93	26,717
Calgary-Falconridge	4,954	32.86	10,121	67.14	15,075
Calgary-Fish Creek	11,236	40.50	16,510	59.50	27,746
Calgary-Foothills	9,847	36.26	17,310	63.74	27,157
Calgary-Glenmore	9,809	36.17	17,312	63.83	27,121
Calgary-Hays	10,954	43.53	14,210	56.47	25,164
Calgary-Klein	7,750	34.80	14,522	65.20	22,272
Calgary-Lougheed	8,901	42.56	12,011	57.44	20,912
Calgary-Bhullar-McCall	3,644	27.77	9,478	72.23	13,122
Calgary-Mountain View	6,913	24.36	21,464	75.64	28,377
Calgary-North	7,608	37.32	12,776	62.68	20,384
Calgary-North East	8,823	34.14	17,017	65.86	25,840
Calgary-North West	9,688	35.03	17,969	64.97	27,657
Calgary-Peigan	9,857	41.79	13,728	58.21	23,585
Calgary-Shaw	13,625	42.97	18,080	57.03	31,705
Calgary-South East	14,529	45.31	17,537	54.69	32,066
Calgary-Varsity	7,051	28.03	18,103	71.97	25,154
Calgary-West	9,665	38.58	15,384	61.42	25,049
Edmonton-Beverly-Clareview	6,670	37.67	11,035	62.33	17,705
Edmonton-Castle Downs	7,512	34.31	14,382	65.69	21,894
Edmonton-City Centre	4,387	22.09	15,474	77.91	19,861
Edmonton-Decore	6,408	35.30	11,743	64.70	18,151
Edmonton-Ellerslie	7,927	33.53	15,716	66.47	23,643
Edmonton-Glenora	5,700	25.93	16,283	74.07	21,983
Edmonton-Gold Bar	6,498	25.36	19,129	74.64	25,627
Edmonton-Highlands-Norwood	4,388	26.82	11,972	73.18	16,360
Edmonton-Manning	8,434	36.24	14,841	63.76	23,275
Edmonton-McClung	6,183	33.40	12,327	66.60	18,510
Edmonton-Meadows	6,761	32.22	14,221	67.78	20,982
Edmonton-Mill Woods	7,181	35.26	13,186	64.74	20,367
Edmonton-North West	6,733	32.88	13,744	67.12	20,477
Edmonton-Riverview	5,708	25.36	16,797	74.64	22,505
Edmonton-Rutherford	5,835	25.86	16,729	74.14	22,564
Edmonton-South	10,488	33.43	20,881	66.57	31,369
Edmonton-South West	12,487	36.18	22,023	63.82	34,510
Edmonton-Strathcona	3,882	18.46	17,147	81.54	21,029
Edmonton-West Henday	9,721	37.05	16,517	62.95	26,238
Edmonton-Whitemud	6,795	28.46	17,083	71.54	23,878
Airdrie-Cochrane	19,081	48.57	20,208	51.43	39,289
Airdrie-East	15,356	51.00	14,753	49.00	30,109
Athabasca-Barrhead-Westlock	14,558	63.40	8,403	36.60	22,961
Banff-Kananaskis	10,471	36.69	18,066	63.31	28,537
Bonnyville-Cold Lake-St. Paul	12,989	60.56	8,458	39.44	21,447
Brooks-Medicine Hat	12,832	58.63	9,055	41.37	21,887
Camrose	13,396	60.18	8,865	39.82	22,261
Cardston-Siksika	10,834	61.84	6,686	38.16	17,520
Central Peace-Notley	8,891	70.25	3,766	29.75	12,657
Chestermere-Strathmore	15,066	52.82	13,456	47.18	28,522
Cypress-Medicine Hat	12,797	52.73	11,472	47.27	24,269
Drayton Valley-Devon	16,790	66.06	8,628	33.94	25,418
Drumheller-Stettler	14,145	71.87	5,536	28.13	19,681
Fort McMurray-Lac La Biche	8,555	59.71	5,773	40.29	14,328
Fort McMurray-Wood Buffalo	8,181	64.56	4,490	35.44	12,671
Fort Saskatchewan-Vegreville	15,345	55.02	12,546	44.98	27,891
Grande Prairie	11,497	59.48	7,832	40.52	19,329
Grande Prairie-Wapiti	15,472	68.45	7,132	31.55	22,604
Highwood	17,560	56.38	13,588	43.62	31,148
Innisfail-Sylvan Lake	16,985	64.28	9,439	35.72	26,424
Lac Ste. Anne-Parkland	15,829	62.21	9,616	37.79	25,445
Lacombe-Ponoka	15,550	64.12	8,700	35.88	24,250
Leduc-Beaumont	14,861	50.24	14,717	49.76	29,578
Lesser Slave Lake	4,772	48.32	5,103	51.68	9,875
Lethbridge-East	10,054	42.11	13,823	57.89	23,877
Lethbridge-West	9,565	36.43	16,692	63.57	26,257
Livingstone-Macleod	15,897	57.69	11,661	42.31	27,558
Maskwacis-Wetaskiwin	11,851	55.69	9,431	44.31	21,282
Morinville-St. Albert	13,247	46.57	15,201	53.43	28,448
Olds-Didsbury-Three Hills	18,365	67.66	8,780	32.34	27,145
Peace River	8,155	56.00	6,407	44.00	14,562
Red Deer-North	10,971	52.17	10,058	47.83	21,029
Red Deer-South	13,410	50.25	13,278	49.75	26,688
Rimbey-Rocky Mountain House-Sundre	17,790	72.48	6,755	27.52	24,545
Sherwood Park	11,524	38.64	18,301	61.36	29,825
Spruce Grove-Stony Plain	15,030	48.62	15,882	51.38	30,912
St. Albert	9,971	33.52	19,771	66.48	29,742
Strathcona-Sherwood Park	13,723	46.88	15,550	53.12	29,273
Taber-Warner	12,508	68.57	5,733	31.43	18,241
Vermilion-Lloydminster-Wainwright	13,850	68.66	6,322	31.34	20,172
West Yellowhead	14,155	62.50	8,494	37.50	22,649
Total	908,729	44.17	1,148,744	55.83	2,057,473
Source: Elections Alberta

=== Independence question ===
Should Alberta remain a province of Canada or should the Government of Alberta commence the legal process required under the Canadian Constitution to hold a binding provincial referendum on whether or not Alberta should separate from Canada?

Question 10
Choice	Votes	%
Remain	1,556,316	74.95
Referendum	520,233	25.05
Total	2,076,549	100.00
Valid votes	2,076,549	93.69
Invalid/blank votes	139,956	6.31
Total votes	2,216,505	100.00
Registered voters/turnout	3,148,205	70.41
Source: Elections Alberta

== Polling ==
An October 2026 Pollara poll found the following results.

Question	Support	Oppose	Not sure
Do you support the Government of Alberta introducing a law requiring individuals to provide proof of citizenship, such as a passport, birth certificate, or citizenship card, to vote in an AB provincial election?	65%	30%	5%
Do you support the Government of Alberta introducing a law requiring all people who are not Canadian citizens or permanent residents to reside in Alberta for at least 12 months before qualifying for any provincially funded social support programs?	63%	32%	5%
Do you support the Government of Alberta introducing a law that only Canadian citizens/permanent residents/individuals with AB-approved immigration status will be eligible for provincially funded programs (health care/education/other social services)?	62%	33%	5%
Do you support the Government of Alberta taking increased control over immigration for purposes of decreasing immigration to more sustainable levels/prioritizing economic migration/giving Albertans 1st priority on employment opportunities?	60%	34%	6%
Do you support the Government of Alberta charging a reasonable fee or premium to people who are not Canadian citizens or permanent residents for their & their family’s use of the health care & education systems?	58%	35%	6%
Do you support abolishing the unelected federal Senate?	41%	36%	22%
Do you support having provincial governments, & not the federal government, select the justices appointed to provincial King’s Bench & Appeal courts?	43%	41%	16%
Do you support giving provincial laws dealing with provincial or shared areas of constitutional jurisdiction priority over federal laws when provincial & federal laws conflict?	43%	42%	15%
Do you support allowing provinces to opt out of federal programs that intrude on provincial jurisdiction such as health care/education/social services, without a province losing any of the associated federal funding for use in its social programs?	41%	48%	11%

A September 2026 Angus Reid poll found the following results.

Question	Support	Oppose	Not sure
Do you support the Government of Alberta taking increased control over immigration for the purposes of decreasing immigration to more sustainable levels, prioritizing economic migration and giving Albertans first priority on new employment opportunities?	62%	33%	8%
Do you support the Government of Alberta introducing a law mandating that only Canadian citizens, permanent residents and individuals with an Alberta-approved immigration status will be eligible for provincially-funded programs, such as health care, education and other social services?	61%	31%	5%
Do you support the Government of Alberta working with the governments of other willing provinces to amend the Canadian Constitution to allow provinces to opt out of federal programs that intrude on provincial jurisdiction such as health care, education and social services, without a province losing any of the associated federal funding for use in its social programs?	44%	44%	5%

An August 2026 Research Co. poll found the following results.

Question	Support	Oppose	Not sure
Do you support the Government of Alberta taking increased control over immigration for the purposes of decreasing immigration to more sustainable levels, prioritizing economic migration and giving Albertans first priority on new employment opportunities?	65%	26%	10%
Do you support the Government of Alberta introducing a law mandating that only Canadian citizens, permanent residents and individuals with an Alberta-approved immigration status will be eligible for provincially-funded programs, such as health care, education and other social services?	58%	32%	10%
Assuming that all Canadian citizens and permanent residents continue to qualify for social support programs as they do now, do you support the Government of Alberta introducing a law requiring all individuals with a non-permanent legal immigration status to reside in Alberta for at least 12 months before qualifying for any provincially-funded social support programs?	60%	26%	14%
Assuming that all Canadian citizens and permanent residents continue to qualify for public health care and education as they do now, do you support the Government of Alberta charging a reasonable fee or premium to individuals with a non-permanent immigration status living in Alberta for their and their family's use of the health care and education systems?	60%	28%	13%
Do you support the Government of Alberta introducing a law requiring individuals to provide proof of citizenship, such as a passport, birth certificate or citizenship card, to vote in an Alberta provincial election?	66%	24%	9%
Do you support the Government of Alberta working with the governments of other willing provinces to amend the Canadian Constitution to have provincial governments, and not the federal government, select the justices appointed to provincial King's Bench and Appeal courts?	45%	31%	23%
Do you support the Government of Alberta working with the governments of other willing provinces to amend the Canadian Constitution to abolish the unelected federal Senate?	39%	33%	28%
Do you support the Government of Alberta working with the governments of other willing provinces to amend the Canadian Constitution to allow provinces to opt out of federal programs that intrude on provincial jurisdiction such as health care, education and social services, without a province losing any of the associated federal funding for use in its social programs?	41%	40%	18%
Do you support the Government of Alberta working with the governments of other willing provinces to amend the Canadian Constitution to better protect provincial rights from federal interference by giving a province's laws dealing with provincial or shared areas of constitutional jurisdiction priority over federal laws when the province's laws and federal laws conflict?	46%	33%	20%

A July 2026 ACS-Leger poll found the following results. % Support:

Question	Total	Atl.	QC	ON	MB/SK	AB	BC
Do you support the Government of Alberta taking increased control over immigration for the purposes of decreasing immigration to more sustainable levels, prioritizing economic migration and giving Albertans first priority on new employment opportunities?	69%	74%	78%	67%	60%	64%	66%
Do you support the Government of Alberta introducing a law mandating that only Canadian citizens, permanent residents and individuals with an Alberta approved immigration status will be eligible for provincially-funded programs, such as health care, education and other social services?	74%	81%	77%	72%	77%	71%	77%
Assuming that all Canadian citizens and permanent residents continue to qualify for public health care and education as they do now, do you support the Government of Alberta charging a reasonable fee or premium to individuals with a non-permanent immigration status living in Alberta for their and their family's use of the health care and education systems?	75%	84%	79%	72%	79%	68%	78%
Assuming that all Canadian citizens and permanent residents continue to qualify for public health care and education as they do now, do you support the Government of Alberta charging a reasonable fee or premium to individuals with a non-permanent immigration status living in Alberta for their and their family’s use of the healthcare and education systems?	73%	80%	74%	72%	75%	65%	75%
Do you support the Government of Alberta introducing a law requiring individuals to provide proof of citizenship, such as a passport, birth certificate or citizenship card, to vote in an Alberta provincial election?	76%	83%	79%	72%	73%	76%	77%
Do you support the Government of Alberta working with the governments of other willing provinces to amend the Canadian Constitution to have provincial governments, and not the federal government, select the justices appointed to provincial King’s Bench and Appeal courts?	55%	59%	65%	47%	50%	52%	60%
Do you support the Government of Alberta working with the governments of other willing provinces to amend the Canadian Constitution to abolish the unelected federal Senate?	57%	57%	67%	51%	48%	54%	63%
Do you support the Government of Alberta working with the governments of other willing provinces to amend the Canadian Constitution to allow provinces to opt out of federal programs that intrude on provincial jurisdiction such as health care, education, and social services, without a province losing any of the associated federal funding for use in its social programs?	47%	42%	59%	40%	43%	47%	51%
Do you support the Government of Alberta working with the governments of other willing provinces to amend the Canadian Constitution to better protect provincial rights from federal interference by giving a province’s laws dealing with provincial or shared areas of constitutional jurisdiction priority over federal laws when the province’s laws and federal laws conflict?	64%	75%	73%	57%	67%	62%	61%

A March 2026 Leger poll found the following results.

Question	Support	Oppose	Don't know
Would you support or oppose a policy where only Canadian citizens, permanent residents, and individuals with a provincially approved immigration status would be eligible for provincially funded programs such as public health care, education, and other social services?	63%	24%	12%
Would you support or oppose charging a reasonable fee or premium to individuals with a non-permanent immigration status for their and their family's use of public health care and education systems?	64%	24%	12%
Would you support or oppose a policy requiring individuals with a non-permanent legal immigration status to live in a province for at least 12 months before qualifying for provincially funded social support programs?	66%	23%	12%

== See also ==
- 2026 Alberta independence referendum
- 2026 Canadian electoral calendar
- 2026 Quebec general election
- Politics of Alberta
