= 1915 Alberta liquor plebiscite =

- July 21, 1915
- Do you approve of the proposed act, the "Liquor Act" ?

Results
Choice	Votes	%
Yes	58,295	60.85%
No	37,509	39.15%
Valid votes	95,804	100.26%
Invalid or blank votes	1,649	1.73%
Total votes	95,554	100.00%

The 1915 Alberta liquor plebiscite was the first plebiscite to ask Alberta voters to decide on a public issue. The 1915 question was whether Alberta should implement prohibition by ratifying the proposed Liquor Act. The plebiscite was the culmination of years of lobbying by the province's temperance movements and agricultural groups, and was forced by the submission of a 24,000-name petition under a recently implemented direct democracy law, the Direct Legislation Act. Alberta voters voted in favour of prohibition, which was implemented eleven months after the vote. The June 21, 1915 plebiscite was the first of three province-wide plebiscites held in a seven-year period related to liquor in Alberta.

== Background ==
=== Prohibition in the North-West Territories ===
Prohibition was not a new concept for Albertans since prior to the creation of the Province of Alberta in 1905, prohibition had been law in the North-West Territories from 1873 to 1891. Prohibition time was then a federal policy intended to prevent the Territories' Indigenous population from purchasing liquor from American whiskey traders, but white settlers were permitted to import liquor with easily-available approval from the Lieutenant Governor. In 1891, prohibition was repealed in the North-West Territories with the Liquor License Ordinance, which was administered by the Board of License Commissioners, rather than the local government, following the model already in place in Ontario and Manitoba. The ordinance allowed a hotels in communities to be issued a license to serve liquor. A community with less than 500 people was limited to two licensed establishments, with each additional 500 persons being allowed the maximum number of licensed establishments in the community increase by one. The ordinance also required licensed hotels to provide food and lodging. Liquor laws were enforced by liquor inspectors, and an order by two concurring justices of the peace could prevent a person from buying liquor for one year if the individual was known to drink excessively.

Prohibition remained a significant national issue in the late-19th century, and during the 1896 Canadian federal election, Wilfrid Laurier promised that a Liberal government would provide Canadians with the opportunity to register their opinion on the sale of liquor. In the non-binding 1898 Canadian prohibition plebiscite a slim majority of the country approved prohibition, with 51.26 per cent in favour with 44 per cent of the electorate participating. In the North-West Territories, which included present-day Alberta, Saskatchewan, and parts of Manitoba, prohibition was approved by a clear majority with 68.8 per cent of voters. Despite the slim national majority, Laurier's government chose not to introduce a federal bill on prohibition.

=== Direct legislation ===
After Alberta attained provincehood in 1905, the movement for direct legislation took form. The Grain Growers Guide published articles about the benefits of direct legislation, and the growing United Farmers of Alberta pressured the Liberal government starting in 1909. It was promoted by the Conservative Party, in March 1912 and finally came to fruition with the Direct Legislation Act in 1913.

The minority Conservative Party also sought to capitalize on the prohibition issue prior to the 1913 election, with the party convention in March 1912 committing to holding a plebiscite on prohibition. The Liberal government was less willing to commit to prohibition since it recognized the revenue generated through licensing. The Liberals instead advocated for incremental changes through reform to improve conditions related to liquor.

The temperance movement quickly responded to the new tool of direct legislation by providing a petition signed by 23,656 persons for a "Prohibitory Liquor Act" to Premier Arthur Sifton. Under the law, he had to pass such a law or hold a referendum on the issue.

The premier tabled the petition in the 3rd Alberta Legislature on October 13, 1914. Sifton created a special committee to study the petition consisting of Members George P. Smith, John M. Glendenning, and Albert Ewing. A week later on October 19, the special committee declared the petition conformed with the requirements of the Direct Legislation Act, and the Legislature moved for the Liquor Act to be submitted to a vote of the electors.

The referendum date was set for July 21, 1915.

=== Arguments on prohibition ===
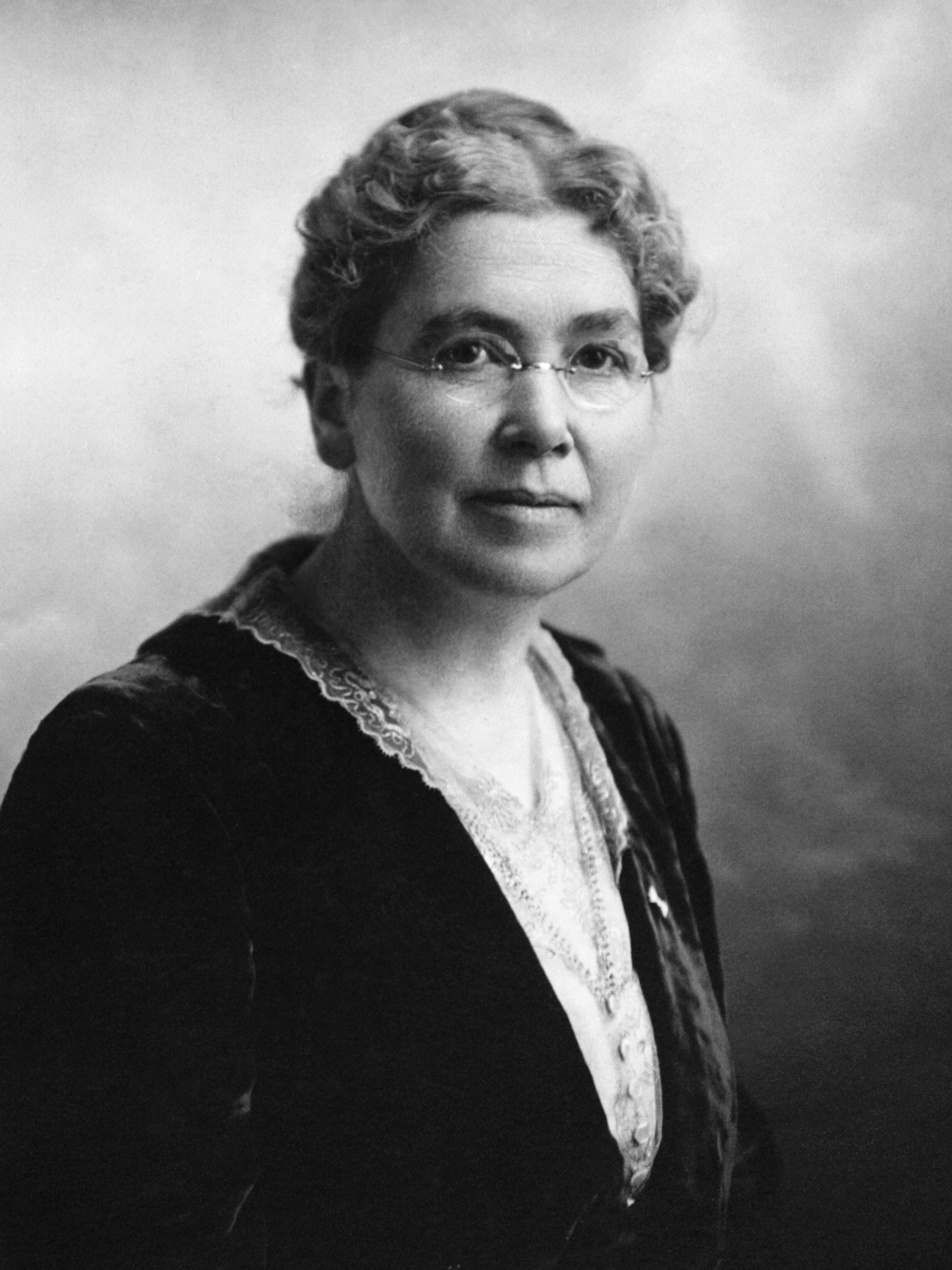
Louise McKinney, President of the Alberta-Saskatchewan Union of the Women's Christian Temperance Movement

Prohibition was pushed forward primarily by two temperance groups, the Women's Christian Temperance Movement (WCTM) and the Temperance and Moral Reform League (TMRL), as well as the United Farmers of Alberta. The TMRL shared many of the same ideals as the WCTM but was structured to mirror a political party, with a central executive and local organizations in each of Alberta's electoral districts. The president of the TMRL during the runup to the plebiscite was T. H. Miller. Both the WCTM and the TMRL sought to ensure that temperance MLAs were elected, irrespective of party, and that strong representation existed politically in Alberta with temperance values being shared by Lieutenant Governor George H. V. Bulyea, Premier Alexander Cameron Rutherford, Crown Minister William Henry Cushing, and Conservative leader R. B. Bennett. Additional arguments for prohibition were printed in William McCartney Davidson's Calgary Albertan. The WTCM named Louise McKinney President of the Alberta-Saskatchewan Union of the organization in 1908, and McKinney led the WTCM through the prohibition plebiscite. Two years after the plebiscite, McKinney was elected as a Member of the Legislative Assembly of Alberta in the 1917 general election and became the first woman legislator in the British Empire.

The public proponents of prohibition were primarily preachers and newspapers and effectively drew comparisons between the struggle of soldiers in the First World War fight against the "evil" Central Powers and the temperance campaign's battle against the "evil" of liquor. Other strong arguments made by proponents of prohibition included the better use of valuable grains for the war effort, rather than alcohol, and showing alcoholics as wasteful with money and neglectful of their family obligations. The TMRL released a statement estimating that liquor sales in Alberta cost the public $12,292,215 per year (equivalent to CAD$330,882,246 in 2025) and prepared a $30,000 budget to campaign on the issue. The TMRL campaign included bringing speakers in from across Canada and the United States to discuss the benefits of prohibition, including the leader of the Ontario Liberal Party Newton Rowell. One major surprise for proponents of prohibition was Bob Edwards's public support in his newspaper the Calgary Eye-Opener, despite his reputation as an alcoholic.

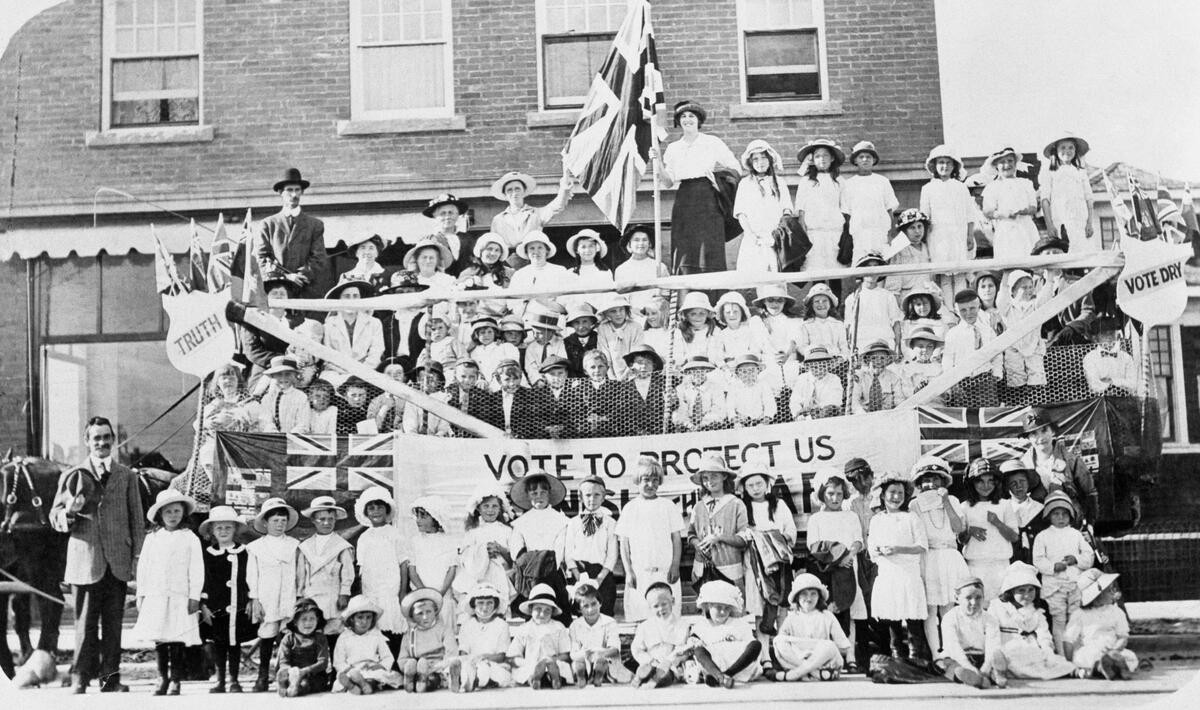
A Calgary Sunday school promoting the prohibition vote

Arguments against prohibition were made primarily by Ukrainian Canadians , French Canadians, and some of the soldiera. The groups often brought in American speakers to discuss the failures of prohibition, and their efforts were subsequently branded as unpatriotic by proponents of prohibition, as the United States had yet to enter the First World War. Opposition by men aged 18 to 40 was limited, as many were shipped overseas for the war effort. Other arguments included that the Liquor Act was ineffective at closing liquor channels, government liquor vendors were a potential source for corruption, drug stores would become liquor stores and physicians would become liquor salesmen, and liquor would still be accessible by the rich while the working class would not have the same access to liquor. Furthermore, those against prohibition noted that many US states had repealed their prohibition laws. The anti-prohibition groups brought in the speaker A. C. Windle, who vividly described the issues that would arise from prohibition, including a loss of economic activity and jobs for bartenders, hotels employees, truck drivers, and others.

The two major Alberta newspapers, the Calgary Herald and Edmonton Journal, argued against prohibition and instead favored the idea of temperance without legal consequences.

== Aftermath ==
The province voted by a large majority in favour of the new Liquor Act, which enforced prohibition on the province effective July 1, 1916, eleven months after the vote. The results of the plebiscite were binding.

The aftermath for hotels and clubs was challenging, and many closed down or sold out prior to the Liquor Act coming into force. A large number flocked to the hotels and bars on June 30, 1916 on the last day of liquor service, but bar operators found it difficult to estimate necessary liquor supplies adequately, as they did not want surplus inventory. Red Deer bars ran dry on June 29, and Calgary bars were reported to have run out of beer by noon of June 30. Reporters in Edmonton observed patrons lining up to purchase liquor to take home, rather than consume the alcohol in the bar. The historian Hugh Dempsey noted that the last day before prohibition was a celebration across Alberta, with minimal disruption or arrests by prepared police officers.

Prohibition proved to be difficult for the government to administer, with the North-West Mounted Police (NWMP) refusing to enforce the resource intensive law. Prohibition, the reduced manpower from the First World War, and additional domestic wartime responsibilities resulted in the Alberta government agreeing to withdraw the NWMP and form the Alberta Provincial Police in March 1917. Albertans found numerous ways around prohibition, including drinking spirits under 2.5 per cent alcohol and private importation, which were barred under federal law during First World War and then again after 1920, and alcohol for medicinal purposes. Alberta's Liquor Act did not prohibit the manufacturing of liquor in Alberta.

The financial consequence of prohibition to the Alberta government was significant. Revenue from government-controlled liquor sales dropped to nearly zero in 1916 and did not start to recover until 1919, when doctors began writing wholesale prescriptions in the wake of the Spanish flu. It was estimated that the population rejecting the plebiscite would have resulted in the government deficit being reduced by at least $1 million annually. The government had reported an income from liquor licenses in 1914 of $251,575.

In 1920, the government of Canada held a national plebiscite on prohibition, and Albertans once again voted in favor of maintaining prohibition and banning the importation of liquor across provincial borders, which meant a return to the federal First World War prohibition law. However, the margin was smaller, with 60.55 per cent in favor.

The Alberta government held another plebiscite in 1923. This time, the electorate overwhelmingly approved government controlled liquor sales and ending prohibition in Alberta seven years after it had begun.

== Tabulation of results ==
Province wide returns
Option					Votes	%
Yes					58,295	60.85%
No					37,509	39.15%
Total					95,804	100%
Rejected, spoiled and declined					1,649	
Returns by district
District	Yes	%	No	%	Total	Yes/no
Acadia	1,660	81.02%	389	18.98%	2,249	Yes
Alexandra	811	70.10%	346	29.90%	1,157	Yes
Athabasca	397	43.67%	512	56.33%	909	No
Beaver River	280	27.37%	743	72.63%	1,023	No
Bow Valley	265	47.49%	293	52.51%	558	No
Centre Calgary	1,442	55.59%	1,152	44.41%	2,594	Yes
North Calgary	2,189	61.70%	1,359	38.30%	3,548	Yes
South Calgary	3,994	63.78%	2,268	36.22%	6,262	Yes
Camrose	1,933	72.45%	735	27.55%	2,668	Yes
Cardston	761	79.35%	198	20.65%	959	Yes
Claresholm	664	71.09%	270	28.91%	934	Yes
Clearwater	57	63.33%	33	36.67%	90	Yes
Cochrane	614	71.73%	242	28.27%	856	Yes
Coronation	1,475	70.31%	623	29.69%	2,098	Yes
Didsbury	1,535	78.76%	414	21.24%	1,949	Yes
Edmonton	5,700	62.73%	3,386	37.27%	9,086	Yes
Edmonton South	2,258	66.55%	1,135	33.45%	3,393	Yes
Edson	511	46.29%	593	53.71%	1,104	No
Gleichen	818	61.69%	508	38.31%	1,326	Yes
Grouard	168	26.05%	477	73.95%	645	No
Hand Hills	1,730	70.33%	730	29.67%	2,460	Yes
High River	815	72.06%	316	27.94%	1,131	Yes
Innisfail	784	71.79%	308	28.21%	1,092	Yes
Lac Ste. Anne	402	39.37%	619	60.63%	1,021	No
Lacombe	1,471	78.41%	405	21.59%	1,876	Yes
Leduc	694	58.81%	486	41.19%	1,180	Yes
Lethbridge City	989	34.58%	1,871	65.42%	2,860	No
Little Bow	1,029	69.25%	457	30.75%	1,486	Yes
Macleod	450	52.39%	409	47.61%	859	Yes
Medicine Hat	2,600	58.52%	1,843	41.48%	4,443	Yes
Nanton	689	74.17%	240	25.83%	929	Yes
Okotoks	512	57.66%	376	42.34%	888	Yes
Olds	958	69.37%	423	30.63%	1,381	Yes
Peace River	720	61.22%	456	38.78%	1,176	Yes
Pembina	598	58.74%	420	41.26%	1,018	Yes
Pincher Creek	384	45.99%	451	54.01%	835	No
Ponoka	701	64.55%	385	35.45%	1,086	Yes
Red Deer	1,221	71.49%	487	28.51%	1,708	Yes
Redcliff	771	48.13%	831	51.87%	1,602	No
Ribstone	1,118	69.88%	482	30.13%	1,600	Yes
Rocky Mountain	881	38.76%	1,392	61.24%	2,273	No
Sedgewick	1,447	72.17%	558	27.83%	2,005	Yes
St. Albert	315	29.83%	741	70.17%	1,056	No
Stettler	1,478	68.65%	675	31.35%	2,153	Yes
St. Paul	239	26.85%	651	73.15%	890	No
Stony Plain	42	6.70%	585	93.30%	627	No
Sturgeon	851	49.74%	860	50.26%	1,711	No
Taber	1,602	66.64%	802	33.36%	2,404	Yes
Vegreville	1,164	62.88%	687	37.12%	1,851	Yes
Vermilion	1,164	62.88%	687	37.12%	1,851	Yes
Victoria	790	56.55%	607	43.45%	1,397	No
Wainwright	903	62.49%	542	37.51%	1,445	Yes
Warner	414	56.17%	323	43.83%	737	Yes
Wetaskiwin	943	65.71%	492	34.29%	1,435	Yes
Whitford	415	40.81%	602	59.19%	1,017	No

=== Turnout ===
The Government of Alberta did not provide an official turnout for the 1915 Alberta liquor plebiscite, however the estimated turnout would have been around 70 per cent of eligible voters. A total of 95,804 people voted in the plebiscite, while the population of the province in 1911 was 374,000, with a voting population of approximately 107,487, which is estimated to have increased to between 136,000 and 140,000 by 1915.
