= Calgary-Peigan =

Provincial electoral district in Alberta, Canada

Alberta electoral district
- Calgary-Peigan within the City of Calgary (2017 boundaries)

Provincial electoral district
- Legislature: Legislative Assembly of Alberta
MLA
Tanya Fir
United Conservative
- District created: 2017
- First contested: 2019
- Last contested: 2023

Demographics
- Population (2016): 45,810
- Area (km²): 110.1
- Pop. density (per km²): 416.1

Calgary-Peigan is a provincial electoral district in Alberta, Canada. The district will be one of 87 districts mandated to return a single member (MLA) to the Legislative Assembly of Alberta using the first past the post method of voting. It was contested for the first time in the 2019 Alberta election.

== Geography ==
The district is located in eastern Calgary, containing the western part of Dover, the neighbourhoods of Ogden, Riverbend, Quarry Park, Douglasdale and Douglasglen, the northern part of McKenzie Lake, and the former hamlet of Shepard. It is bounded on the west by the Bow River and stretches to the eastern edge of Calgary, also including the sprawling industrial subdivisions around the CPR lands and Ralph Klein Park. It is named for Peigan Trail SE, which forms part of its northern boundary.

== History ==
Members for Calgary-Peigan
Assembly	Years	Member	Party
See Calgary-Fort 1997–2019 and Calgary-Hays 2004–2019
30th	2019–2023	Tanya Fir	United Conservative
31st	2023–	Tanya Fir	United Conservative

The district was created in 2017 when the Electoral Boundaries Commission recommended abolishing Calgary-Fort and shifting the boundaries of Calgary-Hays southward. Calgary-Peigan was formed from most of Calgary-Fort, the northern neighbourhoods of Calgary-Hays, and a small part of Calgary-Acadia (the neighbourhood of Riverbend). As Fort Calgary was moved to the district of Calgary-Buffalo, the name Calgary-Fort could no longer be used.

== Electoral results ==
Redistributed results, 2015 Alberta election
Party	Votes	%
New Democratic	6,538	35.57
Progressive Conservative	5,820	31.66
Wildrose	5,041	27.43
Liberal	680	1.64
Others	302 (Note: Includes an Alberta Party candidate in Calgary-Fort and Green and Social Credit candidates in Calgary-Hays.)	3.13

2019 Alberta general election
Party	Candidate	Votes	%	±%
United Conservative	Tanya Fir	13,353	59.83%	0.74%
New Democratic	Joe Pimlott	6,527	29.25%	-6.32%
Alberta Party	Ronald Reinhold	1,534	6.87%	–
Liberal	Jaro Giesbrecht	425	1.90%	0.26%
Freedom Conservative	Sheyne Espey	299	1.34%	–
Alberta Independence	Will Hatch	180	0.81%	–
Total		22,318	–	–
Rejected, spoiled and declined		165	50	2
Eligible electors / turnout		33,899	66.33%	–
United Conservative pickup new district.				
Source(s) Source: "22 - Calgary-Peigan, 2019 Alberta general election". officialresults.elections.ab.ca. Elections Alberta. Alberta. Chief Electoral Officer (2019). 2019 General Election. A Report of the Chief Electoral Officer. Volume II (PDF) (Report). Vol. 2. Edmonton, Alta.: Elections Alberta. pp. 84–87. ISBN 978-1-988620-12-1.

2023 Alberta general election
Party	Candidate	Votes	%	±%
United Conservative	Tanya Fir	11,892	55.02	-4.81
New Democratic	Denis Ram	9,095	42.08	+12.84
Green	Shaun Pulsifer	626	2.90	–
Total		21,613	99.36	–
Rejected and declined		139	0.64	
Turnout		21,752	62.27	
Eligible voters		34,932		
United Conservative hold		Swing		-8.82
Source(s) Source: Elections Alberta

== See also ==
- List of Alberta provincial electoral districts
- Canadian provincial electoral districts
