= Tanya Fir =

Canadian politician

The Honourable Tanya Fir ECA MLA
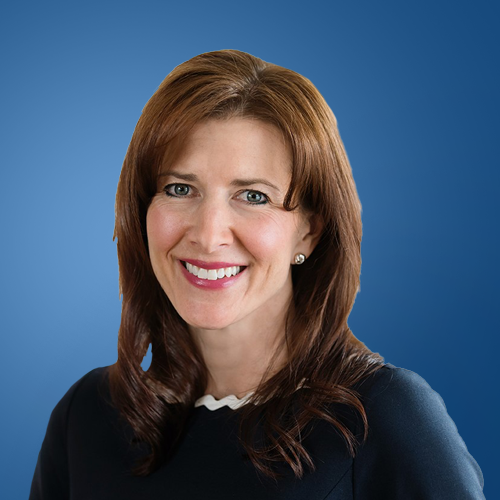
- Tanya Fir

Minister of Arts, Culture, and the Status of Women
- Incumbent
- Assumed office June 9, 2023
- Premier: Danielle Smith
- Preceded by: Jason Luan

Alberta Minister of Jobs, Economy and Innovation
- In office August 26, 2022 – October 23, 2022
- Premier: Jason Kenney; Danielle Smith
- Preceded by: Doug Schweitzer
- Succeeded by: Brian Jean

Parliamentary Secretary to the Alberta Minister of Red Tape Reduction
- In office July 8, 2021 – October 23, 2022
- Premier: Jason Kenney
- Preceded by: Grant Hunter
- Succeeded by: Dale Nally

Member of the Legislative Assembly of Alberta for Calgary-Peigan
- Incumbent
- Assumed office April 16, 2019
- Preceded by: Riding established

Personal details
- Born: 1975 (age 50–51) Cranbrook, British Columbia, Canada
- Party: United Conservative Party
- Education: University of Calgary

Tanya Fir ECA MLA (born 1975) is a Canadian politician who was elected in the 2019 Alberta general election to represent the electoral district of Calgary-Peigan in the 30th Alberta Legislature. She is a member of the United Conservative Party.

== Background ==
Born in Cranbrook, Fir moved to Calgary with her family in 1985.

Prior to serving with the Legislative Assembly, Fir was employed with Canadian Natural Resources Limited (CNRL) for 16 years as a Human Resources Advisor.

Fir holds a Bachelor of Commerce with a concentration in Management of Organizations and Human Resources from the University of Calgary.

== Political career ==
In August 2018, Fir beat former Ontario MP Jeff Watson and past Wildrose candidate Jeevan Mangat to secure her party's nomination. Her nomination campaign manager was longtime provincial Conservative party organizer Craig Chandler.

On April 30, 2019, she was appointed to be the Minister for Economic Development, Trade and Tourism in the Executive Council of Alberta, holding that role until August 25, 2020. In January 2021, Fir was found to be vacationing in Las Vegas despite the ongoing COVID-19 pandemic and advisory against nonessential travel. She was demoted from her committee duties as a result. Fir was later appointed Associate Minister of Red Tape Reduction on July 8, 2021, and Minister of Jobs, Economy and Innovation on August 26, 2022. Fir held these roles until October 23, 2022. She was appointed Parliamentary Secretary for Status of Women on October 24, 2022.

On June 9, 2023, Fir was appointed Minister of Arts, Culture and Status of Women.

Fir has sat on several committees of the Legislative Assembly including the Standing Committee on Families and Communities, the Standing Committee on Members' Services and others. In addition to this service, Fir has been a member of the Social Services Cabinet Policy Committee.

Fir has spoken to her opposition to red tape and has sponsored two bills to which deal with reducing it. Fir has also been the sponsor of Bill 23, as well as Bill 33 which sought to increase investment in Alberta.

A recall petition against Fir was approved by Elections Alberta on November 27, 2025. Signature collection runs from December 6, 2025 to March 5, 2026, requiring 13,051 signatures.

== Electoral record ==
2023 Alberta general election: Calgary-Peigan
| Party | Candidate | Votes | % | ±% |
|---|---|---|---|---|
| United Conservative | Tanya Fir | 11,892 | 55.02 | -4.81 |
| New Democratic | Denis Ram | 9,095 | 42.08 | +12.84 |
| Green | Shaun Pulsifer | 626 | 2.90 | – |
| Total | | 21,613 | 99.36 | – |
| Rejected and declined | | 139 | 0.64 | |
| Turnout | | 21,752 | 62.27 | |
| Eligible voters | | 34,932 | | |
| United Conservative hold | | Swing | | -8.82 |
Source(s) Source: Elections Alberta

2019 Alberta general election: Calgary-Peigan
| Party | Candidate | Votes | % | ±% |
|---|---|---|---|---|
| United Conservative | Tanya Fir | 13,353 | 59.83% | 0.74% |
| New Democratic | Joe Pimlott | 6,527 | 29.25% | -6.32% |
| Alberta Party | Ronald Reinhold | 1,534 | 6.87% | – |
| Liberal | Jaro Giesbrecht | 425 | 1.90% | 0.26% |
| Freedom Conservative | Sheyne Espey | 299 | 1.34% | – |
| Alberta Independence | Will Hatch | 180 | 0.81% | – |
| Total | | 22,318 | – | – |
| Rejected, spoiled and declined | | 165 | 50 | 2 |
| Eligible electors / turnout | | 33,899 | 66.33% | – |
| United Conservative pickup new district. | | | | |
Source(s) Source: "22 - Calgary-Peigan, 2019 Alberta general election". officialresults.elections.ab.ca. Elections Alberta. Alberta. Chief Electoral Officer (2019). 2019 General Election. A Report of the Chief Electoral Officer. Volume II (PDF) (Report). Vol. 2. Edmonton, Alta.: Elections Alberta. pp. 84–87. ISBN 978-1-988620-12-1.

Alberta provincial government of Jason Kenney
Cabinet post (1)
| Predecessor | Office | Successor |
|---|---|---|
| Doug Schweitzer | Minister of Jobs, Economy and Innovation; August 26, 2022 – October 24, 2022 | Brian Jean |
