= Dale Nally =

Canadian politician

The Honourable Dale Nally ECA MLA

Minister of Service Alberta and Red Tape Reduction
- Incumbent
- Assumed office October 21, 2022
- Premier: Danielle Smith
- Preceded by: Nate Glubish (Service Alberta); Tanya Fir (Red Tape)

Member of the Legislative Assembly of Alberta for Morinville-St. Albert
- Incumbent
- Assumed office April 16, 2019
- Preceded by: New district

Personal details
- Born: 1971 or 1972 (age 54–55)
- Party: United Conservative Party
- Education: Athabasca University
- Occupation: Politician

Dale Nally ECA MLA is a Canadian politician who was elected in the 2019 Alberta general election to the Legislative Assembly of Alberta representing the electoral district of Morinville-St. Albert as a member of the United Conservative Party.

== Private career ==
Nally has decades of private sector experience managing and leading business units that generate between $50 million and $80 million in revenue. He holds a master's degree in education from Athabasca University. Nally's volunteer involvement includes various roles with the St. Albert Minor Hockey Association and co-chair for Diversity Edmonton, a volunteer organization that worked with businesses to promote the hiring of people with disabilities.

== Political career ==
After the 2019 Alberta general election, Nally was sworn in as Alberta's first ever Associate Minister of Natural Gas on April 30, 2019. On March 24, 2020, he was made Associate Minister of Natural Gas and Electricity.

As Associate Minister of Natural Gas and Electricity, he sponsored the Utility Commodity Rebate Act, which gave $50 energy rebates to more than 1.9 million households, farms and businesses. It also enabled the Alberta government to provide a natural gas rebate if regulated natural gas rates exceed $6.50 per gigajoule in the future.

He also supported energy diversification, including hydrogen energy which he described as an “incredible opportunity” for the province. He worked towards the development of a roadmap for accelerating its development and aligning it with those of other provinces. Nally also supported plastic recycling within Alberta. “It’s an area where Alberta can excel,” he said, “by using its petrochemical, research and innovation sectors.”

On October 24, 2022, Nally was made Minister of Service Alberta and Red Tape Reduction.

=== Recall petition attempt ===
A recall petition against Nally was approved by Elections Alberta on November 14, 2025. Nally claimed a constituent behind the effort to recall him didn't vote in the last election and questioned whether that should disqualify the petition. It unsuccessfully gathered out of the requiring 15,700 signatures by the February deadline. In March 2026, Nally was found by Elections Alberta to have accessed a confidential list of electors for which was not "authorized by the Election Act". This violated election law but carried no penalty.

== Electoral history ==
=== 2023 general election ===
2023 Alberta general election: Morinville-St. Albert
| Party | Candidate | Votes | % | ±% |
|---|---|---|---|---|
| United Conservative | Dale Nally | 13,472 | 51.78 | +1.77 |
| New Democratic | Karen Shaw | 11,728 | 45.07 | +11.91 |
| Alberta Party | Wayne Rufiange | 590 | 2.27 | -12.48 |
| Green | Kurt Klingbeil | 230 | 0.88 | +0.15 |
| Total | | 26,020 | 99.44 | – |
| Rejected and declined | | 146 | 0.56 | |
| Turnout | | 26,166 | 65.99 | |
| Eligible voters | | 39,649 | | |
| United Conservative hold | | Swing | | -5.07 |
Source(s) Source: Elections Alberta

=== 2019 general election ===
2019 Alberta general election: Morinville-St. Albert
| Party | Candidate | Votes | % | ±% |
|---|---|---|---|---|
| United Conservative | Dale Nally | 13,435 | 50.01 | +0.38 |
| New Democratic | Natalie Birnie | 8,908 | 33.16 | -15.19 |
| Alberta Party | Neil Korotash | 3,963 | 14.75 | +14.10 |
| Alberta Independence | Mike Van Velzen | 204 | 0.76 | – |
| Green | Cass Romyn | 198 | 0.74 | – |
| Alberta Advantage | Tamara Krywiak | 157 | 0.58 | – |
| Total | | 26,865 | 99.18 | – |
| Rejected, spoiled and declined | | 223 | 0.82 | |
| Turnout | | 27,088 | 73.02 | |
| Eligible voters | | 37,099 | | |
| United Conservative notional hold | | Swing | | +7.79 |
Source(s) Source: "75 - Morinville-St. Albert, 2019 Alberta general election". officialresults.elections.ab.ca. Elections Alberta. Alberta. Chief Electoral Officer (2019). 2019 General Election. A Report of the Chief Electoral Officer. Volume II (PDF) (Report). Vol. 2. Edmonton, Alta.: Elections Alberta. pp. 357–363. ISBN 978-1-988620-12-1.

Alberta provincial government of Jason Kenney
Cabinet post (1)
| Predecessor | Office | Successor |
|---|---|---|
| Position Established | Associate Minister of Natural Gas; April 30, 2019 – March 24, 2020 | Himself as Minister of Natural Gas and Electricity |
