= Ralph Klein Park =

Coordinates: 50.938933°N 113.906164°W

Ralph Klein Park is a 30 hectare wetland park in Calgary, Alberta. It is named after former premier of Alberta and mayor of Calgary Ralph Klein. Construction started in 2009, and the dedication ceremony was on July 19, 2010. The park was opened to the public on June 18, 2011.

The park features public art by Beverly Pepper.

The address of the park is 12350 - 84 Street SE, adjacent to the former hamlet of Shepard. Its operating hours are 10 a.m. to 4 p.m. daily. Ralph Klein Park is open on statutory holidays.

At one time the park's name was slated to be Shepard Wetlands Legacy Park.
