= 1919 Quebec prohibition referendum =

Canadian provincial referendum on the legalization of alcohol

Quebec Alcohol Prohibition Referendum, 1919
- April 10, 1919
- Is it your opinion that the sale of light beer, cider and wines, as defined by law, should be allowed?
- Voting system: Simple majority

Results
Choice	Votes	%
Yes	178,112	78.62%
No	48,433	21.38%

The Quebec referendum on the prohibition of alcohol, held on April 10, 1919, considered the legalization of the sale of beer, cider and wine in the province of Quebec, Canada. The 'yes' side won with 78.62% of the votes.

== Question asked ==
In English
Is it your opinion that the sale of light beer, cider and wines, as defined by law, should be allowed?
In French
Êtes-vous d'opinion que la vente des bières, cidres et vins légers, tels que définis par la loi, devrait être permise ?

== Results ==
178,112 persons (78.62%) voted in favour of the proposal, while 48,433 (21.38%) voted against; the proposal was therefore passed with a majority of 129,679 votes. The analysis of the vote by riding reveals that all voted in favour except for seven: Pontiac, Compton, Dorchester, Huntingdon, Brome, Stanstead and Richmond.

The result of the vote was that the subsequent prohibition law which became effective on May 1, 1919, applied only to spirits. The victory of the "moderate" prohibitionists over the "radicals" did not have immediate repercussion on the legal sale of alcohol for in 1919: 90% of Quebec municipalities were prohibiting its sale locally. Indeed, Trois-Rivières, Lévis, Lachine, Sainte-Agathe, Louiseville, Sainte-Rose and Terrebonne had voted for local prohibition in 1915, while Quebec City had done the same on October 4, 1917. All these regulations had to be rescinded, one municipality at a time.

Prohibition was finally abolished on May 1, 1921, when the Alcoholic Beverages Act creating the Commission des liqueurs du Québec entered into force.

== See also ==
- 1898 Canadian prohibition plebiscite
- 1920 Canadian liquor plebiscite
