= Shepard, Alberta =

Shepard
- Former hamlet
- Location of Shepard in Alberta
- Coordinates: 50°57′07″N 113°54′35″W
- Country: Canada
- Province: Alberta
- City: Calgary
- Quadrant: SE
- Ward: 12
- Annexed: 2007

Government
  - Mayor: Jeromy Farkas
  - Administrative body: Calgary City Council
  - Councillor: Mike Jamieson (A Better Calgary)

Area
  - Land: 0.06 km^{2} (0.023 sq mi)
- Time zone: UTC−06:00 (Alberta Time)

Shepard is a former hamlet within the eastern periphery of Calgary, Alberta, Canada, approximately 24 kilometres (15 mi) east of downtown, that was annexed from Rocky View County in July 2007. Shepard is bound by 84 Street SE to the west, a rail line to the north, and 114 Avenue SE (also known as Beulah Vista Road) to the south. The Stoney Trail ring road passes to the west of the former hamlet. Shepard is immediately north of Ralph Klein Park, a large green space that was developed in the late 2000s.

== History ==
A rail station was built at Shepard by the Canadian Pacific Railway in 1884. It was named after one of the partners of Shepard and Langdon, railway contractors. A school opened in 1886 followed by a church in 1890. The post office opened for four months in 1903 and then reopened from January 1, 1905 until March 8, 1966. The former hamlet remains primarily a residential subdivision with some commercial businesses and its own community hall. It is physically separated from other communities by an industrial area (Shepard Industrial), undeveloped land and Stoney Trail.

== Demographics ==
Population history of Shepard
Year	Pop.	±%
1941	83	—
1951	66	−20.5%
1956	25	−62.1%
1961	66	+164.0%
1966	50	−24.2%
1971	43	−14.0%
1976	80	+86.0%
1981	109	+36.3%
1986	88	−19.3%
1991	113	+28.4%
1996	125	+10.6%
2001	136	+8.8%
Source: Statistics Canada

As a designated place in the 2016 Census of Population conducted by Statistics Canada, Shepard recorded a population of 10 living in 4 of its 4 total private dwellings, a change of 0% from its 2011 population of 10. With a land area of 0.06 km^{2} (0.023 sq mi), it had a population density of 166.7/km^{2} (431.7/sq mi) in 2016.

As a designated place in the 2011 Census, Shepard had a population of 10 living in 5 of its 6 total dwellings, a -50% change from its 2006 population of 20. With a land area of 0.05 km^{2} (0.019 sq mi), it had a population density of 200/km^{2} (520/sq mi) in 2011.

== Annexation ==
In June 2006, the City of Calgary and Rocky View County (then the Municipal District of Rocky View No. 44) reached an agreement for Calgary to annex a large area of land from the municipal district, including Shepard.

The annexation became final upon approval by the Alberta government on July 31, 2007. According to MapArt's Calgary & Southern Alberta Street Guide 2009 Edition, Shepard's streets, previously numbered 1 Street through 5 Street, were renumbered as 85 Street SE through 89 Street SE, while Beulah Vista Road became part of 114 Avenue SE to come into line with Calgary's street numbering system. The only original road name remaining is Rochon Avenue.

In early 2008, the City of Calgary began the process of redesignating and rezoning land within the 2007 annexation areas, including Shepard. A February 22, 2008 proposal called for most land in the subdivision to be redesignated "FUD" for "future urban development".

After annexation, the City of Calgary indicated that municipal services such as water and sewer would be extended to the former hamlet by 2010, but the City indicated in 2013 that it may be 2030 before that occurs. However, in May 2013, city council debated a development plan for the area that, if approved, will see urban development for as many as 27,800 people take place in the coming years.

== See also ==
- List of neighbourhoods in Calgary
