= Morinville-St. Albert =

Provincial electoral district in Alberta, Canada

Alberta electoral district
- Morinville-St. Albert within the Edmonton Metropolitan Region (2017 boundaries)

Provincial electoral district
- Legislature: Legislative Assembly of Alberta
MLA
Dale Nally
United Conservative
- District created: 2017
- First contested: 2019
- Last contested: 2023

Demographics
- Population (2016): 50,225
- Area (km²): 1,376
- Pop. density (per km²): 36.5
- Census subdivision(s): Bon Accord, Gibbons, Legal, Morinville, St. Albert, Redwater

Morinville-St. Albert is a provincial electoral district in Alberta, Canada. The district is one of the 87 districts mandated to return a single member (MLA) to the Legislative Assembly of Alberta using the first past the post method of voting. It was contested for the first time in the 2019 Alberta election.

== Geography ==
The district lies to the north of Edmonton, covering the part of Sturgeon County east of Highway 2 and the part of the City of St. Albert northeast of Boudreau Road. It contains the communities of Morinville, Legal, Bon Accord, Gibbons, and Redwater. It also includes CFB Edmonton. The other major highway in the district is Highway 28.

== History ==
Members for Morinville-St. Albert
Assembly	Years	Member	Party
See Athabasca-Sturgeon-Redwater 2012-2019 and Barrhead-Morinville-Westlock 2004-2019
30th	2019–2023	Dale Nally	United Conservative
31st	2023–	Dale Nally	United Conservative

The district was created in 2017 when the Electoral Boundaries Commission recommended abolishing Barrhead-Morinville-Westlock and Athabasca-Sturgeon-Redwater, creating a new riding from the southern portions of the two and a small part of St. Albert. The Commission reasoned that St. Albert and Morinville were a natural fit, owing to their shared Franco-Albertan heritage.

== Electoral results ==
=== 2023 ===
2023 Alberta general election
Party	Candidate	Votes	%	±%
United Conservative	Dale Nally	13,472	51.78	+1.77
New Democratic	Karen Shaw	11,728	45.07	+11.91
Alberta Party	Wayne Rufiange	590	2.27	-12.48
Green	Kurt Klingbeil	230	0.88	+0.15
Total		26,020	99.44	–
Rejected and declined		146	0.56	
Turnout		26,166	65.99	
Eligible voters		39,649		
United Conservative hold		Swing		-5.07
Source(s) Source: Elections Alberta

=== 2019 ===
2019 Alberta general election
Party	Candidate	Votes	%	±%
United Conservative	Dale Nally	13,435	50.01	+0.38
New Democratic	Natalie Birnie	8,908	33.16	-15.19
Alberta Party	Neil Korotash	3,963	14.75	+14.10
Alberta Independence	Mike Van Velzen	204	0.76	–
Green	Cass Romyn	198	0.74	–
Alberta Advantage	Tamara Krywiak	157	0.58	–
Total		26,865	99.18	–
Rejected, spoiled and declined		223	0.82	
Turnout		27,088	73.02	
Eligible voters		37,099		
United Conservative notional hold		Swing		+7.79
Source(s) Source: "75 - Morinville-St. Albert, 2019 Alberta general election". officialresults.elections.ab.ca. Elections Alberta. Alberta. Chief Electoral Officer (2019). 2019 General Election. A Report of the Chief Electoral Officer. Volume II (PDF) (Report). Vol. 2. Edmonton, Alta.: Elections Alberta. pp. 357–363. ISBN 978-1-988620-12-1.

=== 2015 ===
Redistributed results, 2015 Alberta election
Party	Votes	%
New Democratic	10,764	48.35
Progressive Conservative	6,545	29.40
Wildrose	4,504	20.23
Liberal	303	1.36
Alberta Party	146	0.66
Source(s) Source: Ridingbuilder

== See also ==
- List of Alberta provincial electoral districts
- Canadian provincial electoral districts
