= 1898 Canadian prohibition plebiscite =

- 29 September 1898
- Are you in favour of the passing of an Act prohibiting the importation, manufacture or sale of spirits, wine, ale, beer, cider and all other alcoholic liquors for use as beverages?

Results
Choice	Votes	%
Yes	278,380	51.26%
No	264,693	48.74%
Valid votes	543,073	98.43%
Invalid or blank votes	8,642	1.57%
Total votes	551,715	100.00%
Registered voters/turnout	1,236,419	44.62%
- Results by Results by jurisdiction.

A plebiscite on prohibition was held in Canada on 29 September 1898, the first national referendum in the country's history. The Liberal government had made an election promise in 1896 to provide an opportunity for Canadians to register their opinions about the sale of alcohol. The non-binding plebiscite saw 51.3% in favour of introducing prohibition, although turnout was only 44%. A majority voted for its introduction in all provinces except Quebec, where 81.2% opposed it.

Despite the majority in favour, Prime Minister Wilfrid Laurier's government chose not to introduce a federal bill on prohibition, but not to prevent provinces from passing their own bills. Prohibition laws were passed by provincial governments during the first twenty years of the 20th century. The federal government also moved to ban inter-provincial (mail-order) sale of liquor in some cases.

A 2012 study found that religion was by far the most important factor in determining how Canadians voted, with Evangelicals favouring prohibition, whereas Catholics and Anglicans opposed it. More urbanized districts were less likely to favour prohibition.

== Results ==
Choice	Votes	%
For	278,380	51.26
Against	264,693	48.74
Total	543,073	100.00
Valid votes	543,073	98.43
Invalid/blank votes	8,642	1.57
Total votes	551,715	100.00
Registered voters/turnout	1,236,419	44.62
Source: Direct Democracy

=== By province and territory ===
Jurisdiction	Yes		No	
Jurisdiction	Votes	%	Votes	%
British Columbia	5,731	54.64	4,756	45.36
Manitoba	12,419	80.66	2,978	19.34
New Brunswick	26,919	73.76	9,575	26.24
Northwest Territories	6,238	68.84	2,824	31.16
Nova Scotia	34,368	86.49	5,370	13.51
Ontario	154,498	57.27	115,284	42.73
Prince Edward Island	9,461	89.20	1,146	10.80
Quebec	28,436	18.81	122,760	81.19
Canada	278,380	51.26	264,693	48.74

== See also ==
- 1920 Canadian liquor plebiscite
- 1919 Quebec prohibition referendum
