= 1920 Canadian liquor plebiscites =

Canadian plebiscite on Prohibition

Canadian liquor plebiscites, held in 1920 under the Canada Temperance Act and the Dominion Elections Act, were referendums on the strengthening of the Prohibition measures in effect in several provinces of Canada. Voters were asked if they supported banning of importation of liquor across provincial boundaries. The referendums were held on July 10, 1920, in New Brunswick; on October 20 in British Columbia; and on October 25 in Alberta, Manitoba, Nova Scotia, and Saskatchewan.

The Canada Temperance Act, also known as the Scott Act, allowed provincial and municipal jurisdictions to formulate their own legislation regarding alcohol consumption based upon the results of a plebiscite; the results could not be challenged for at least three years. Between 1916 and 1919, prohibition legislation passed in all the provinces. The sale of alcoholic liquors, except for medical and scientific purposes, was prohibited, with medical need being interpreted loosely with liquor sold by pharmacists. In 1920, eight of the nine provinces of Canada decided to continue prohibition after the war. The Canadian liquor plebiscite addressed this postwar prohibition.

The plebiscite was set up to pose the question of banning liquor importation to provinces where prohibition had been enforced, but liquor could be ordered and imported by mail order. Ontario also had a plebiscite on the issue under the Temperance Act a few months later in 1921.

== By province ==
=== Alberta ===
(October 25, 1920 referendum) — The question up for vote in Alberta was "Shall the importation and bringing of alcohol beverages into the province be forbidden?" After it passed, the federal government waited until February 1921 to ban the inter-provincial trade of alcohol into Alberta and by then many had stockpiled liquor.

Results	Votes	Percent
For	68,012	60.55%
Against	44,321	39.45%
Total	112,333	100%

=== British Columbia ===
(October 20, 1920 referendum) — Voters were presented with the question "Which do you prefer: 1— The present prohibition act? or 2— An act to provide for the government control and sale in sealed packages of spirituous and malted liquors?" By a majority of more than 25,000 voters in British Columbia opted for the sale of liquor under regulation by the provincial government.

=== Manitoba ===
(October 25, 1920 referendum) — By a majority of more than 12,000 voters opted in favour of the Canadian Temperance Act, with the prohibition against importing liquor into Manitoba to go into effect in 60 days. The vote also cleared the way for the Manitoba Temperance Act of 1920 to be proclaimed, limiting liquor to medical prescriptions of no more than 12 ounces, by government-approved dispensers.

=== New Brunswick ===
(July 10, 1920 referendum) — The first provincial vote on whether to retain prohibition took place in New Brunswick, where voters approved the bar against importation of liquor by a majority of 20,000 votes. In another ballot question, the ban against the sale of light wine and against beer was approved a majority of 15,000.

=== Nova Scotia ===
(October 25, 1920 referendum) — Voters in Nova Scotia gave a larger endorsement to prohibition than in the prairie provinces, with 40,000 more votes for prohibiting the importation of liquor than against it. Other than Halifax and Dartmouth, no large cities voted "wet".

=== Saskatchewan ===
(October 25, 1920 referendum) — By a majority of 10,000 voters in Saskatchewan endorsed the Canadian Temperance Act barring the importation of liquor.

== Legacy ==
The federal ban on importation of spirits was later strengthened in the federal Importation of Intoxicating Liquors Act (IILA) of 1928, in place until 2019.

== See also ==
- 1898 Canadian prohibition plebiscite
- 1919 Quebec prohibition referendum
- 1921 Ontario prohibition referendum
- 1923 Alberta prohibition plebiscite
