= 1923 Alberta prohibition plebiscite =

Alberta liquor plebiscite
- November 5, 1923

Results
Prohibition	38.0%
Licensed Sale of Beer	2.4%
Government Sale of Beer	1.9%
Government Sale of All Liquors	57.7%

The 1923 Alberta prohibition plebiscite, held on November 5, 1923, was a province-wide plebiscite held in Alberta, Canada, to allow alcoholic beverages. It was triggered by an affirmative vote in the Legislative Assembly of Alberta after the presentation of a 56,000-name petition. The Direct Legislation Act (1913), a citizens referendum law or initiative law, was in force at the time.

Prohibition was defeated by nearly 58 per cent (58%) of the vote and was replaced by the government sale of liquor and strictly-regulated taverns. Liquor would be sold in government stores, and the government took out the profit motive for "pushing" alcohol and engaged in little advertising to encourage sales. Consumers of liquor had to buy permits, which, if misused, could be "interdicted." As well, after the end of prohibition, the government brought in the local option vote and so communities could hold votes to prohibit sales of liquor in their communities.

Cardston, for example, is a town that voted to uphold prohibition by plebiscite as recently as 2014. Prohibition was abolished in the last few prohibition areas in the province on June 17, 2020, but under the new provincial legislation, those areas will remain a dry until their respective councils pass motions to allow liquor sales.

== Campaign ==
The writs were issued to Alberta's 52 electoral districts (under the 1921 boundaries) on October 9, 1923. Four options were presented to votes and voting was by instant-runoff voting, as favored by the United Farmers government. Voters ranked up to four of the options given. The leadership of the prohibitionist Methodist Church (soon to be part of the United Church) advised its worshippers to plump (mark just one choice) for prohibition. About half the ballots cast had no secondary preferences marked.

In the event, one option, government sale of liquor and private taverns selling beer, took a majority of votes on the first count, and so no additional rounds of counting had to be conducted.

Prohibition Committee Executives
President	W.S. Galbraith
Vice Presidents	J.D. Higgenbottom
Vice Presidents	Gladstone Virtue
Secretary	H.B. Brown
Assistant Secretary	John Wood
Treasure	F.H. Wilkins
Publicity	D.H. Ellen
Transportation	Ralph Thrall
Organizer	Rev. Wealaway

The Prohibition Committee was a campaign committee set up for the plebiscite to campaign for Option A, the option to continue the Liquor Act as it was before the plebiscite. The Prohibitionists had a seven-point platform. Point one encouraged voters to respect the laws already on the books. Point two stated that every constitutional method should be used to enact a change in law when the majority of voters desired a change. Points three, four, and five focused on highlighting harm done by alcohol to the fabric of the community and contended that society is incumbent upon itself to ban such harm. Point six encouraged the crackdown and banning of liquor distilling in Alberta and its exportation outside the province. Point seven supported the committee's satisfaction with the Liquor Act in force to that point. The committee believed that the current legislation was the means to the end and allowed for efforts to be sustained until total prohibition was achieved.

The Moderation League of Alberta was the committee campaigning for Option D, the end of prohibition and its replacement by government control of the sale of booze and sale of beer in licensed premises.

== Results ==
Ballot options	Votes	%
(a) Prohibition - Meaning thereby a continuance and development of present Liquor Legislation; that is, meaning the Abolition of the Sale of all Liquors excepting for strictly Medicinal Sacramental, Manufacturing and Scientific Purposes.	61,647	38.0%
(b) Licensed Sale of Beer - Meaning thereby, the Sale of Beer in Licensed Hotels and other Premises, as provided in the proposed Temperance Act.	3,936	2.4%
(c) Government Sale of Beer - Meaning thereby, the Sale of Beer by or through Government Vendors for consumption in Private Residences under Government Control and Regulations - other Liquors to be sold through Doctor's Prescription for Medicinal Purposes.	3,078	1.9%
(d) Government Sale of All Liquors - Meaning thereby, the Sale of all Liquors by or through Government Vendors. Beer to be consumed on Licensed Premises and in Private Residences. Wines and Spirits to be purchased in limited quantities under permit issued by the government, under Government Control and Regulations.	93,680	57.7%
Total	162,341	100%
Rejected, spoiled and declined	7,272	

(d) won a clear majority on the first ballot. No extra count was required as instant-runoff voting resorts to if needed.

In Edmonton, a clear majority favored option D. Clause A came in second, with options B and C receiving few votes.

In Calgary, 15,586 voters favoured option D, while option A received just 7900 votes, with less than 600 votes cast for options B and C.
