= List of premiers of Ontario =

Below is a list of the premiers of the province of Ontario, Canada, since Confederation in 1867. Ontario uses a unicameral Westminster-style parliamentary government, in which the premier is the leader of the party that controls the most seats in the Legislative Assembly. The premier is Ontario's head of government. The premier picks a cabinet from the elected members to form the Executive Council of Ontario, and presides over that body.

Members are first elected to the legislature during general elections. General elections must be conducted every four years from the date of the last election. An election may also happen if the Governing party loses the confidence of the legislature, by the defeat of a supply bill or tabling of a confidence motion.

This article only covers the time since the Canadian Confederation was created in 1867. For the premiers of Canada West from 1840 to 1867, see List of joint premiers of the Province of Canada.

The 26th and current premier of Ontario is Doug Ford of the Progressive Conservative Party of Ontario since June 29, 2018.

== Premiers of Ontario since 1867 ==
| No. | Portrait | Name (Birth–Death) | Term of office | Electoral mandates (Assembly) | Political party | Parliamentary seat | Cabinet | Ref. |
|---|---|---|---|---|---|---|---|---|
| 1 | | John Sandfield Macdonald (1812–1872) | 16 July 1867 – 20 December 1871 | Title created (caretaker government) 1867 election (1st Leg.) | Liberal–Conservative | MLA for Cornwall | Macdonald ministry | |
| 1 | | John Sandfield Macdonald (1812–1872) | Prior to Confederation in 1867, Sandfield Macdonald was a genuine Liberal/Reform Party Member of the Legislative Assembly of the Province of Canada and a rival of Sir John A Macdonald. He led a Liberal ministry between 1862 and 1864, the only significant interruption of John A Macdonald's rule in the final decade of the united province. Despite being an opponent confederation, Sanfield Macdonald accepted Sir John A's offer of the permiership upon the founding of Canada, and led a notional Coalition (the "Patent Combination") supported by the Conservative Party and only a handful of Liberal members. He was simultaneously an MP in the House of Commons until 1872. | | | | | |
| 2 | | Edward Blake (1833–1912) | 20 December 1871 – 25 October 1872 | 1871 election (2nd Leg.) | Liberal | MLA for Bruce South | Blake ministry | |
| 2 | | Edward Blake (1833–1912) | Led the first, brief Liberal ministry of Ontario that commenced the party's thirty-four years of continuious rule. Was simultaneously a federal MP 1867 to 1872; resigned as Premier in the lead up to the 1872 dominion election (at which point dual mandate was outlawed), and led the national Liberal Party in the 1872, 1882 and 1887 dominion elections. | | | | | |
| 3 | | Sir Oliver Mowat (1820–1903) | 25 October 1872 – 21 July 1896 | Appointment (2nd Leg.) 1875 election (3rd Leg.) 1879 election (4th Leg.) 1883 election (5th Leg.) 1886 election (6th Leg.) 1890 election (7th Leg.) 1894 election (8th Leg.) | Liberal | MLA for Oxford North | Mowat ministry | |
| 3 | | Sir Oliver Mowat (1820–1903) | Secured clear definitions of provincial jurisdiction through a serious of litigations against the national government that went to the Judicial Committee of the Privy Council; doubled the province's physical size with expansion into resource rich area in the north; facilitated sectarian tolerance through explicit policies and government programs; established the education department and the agriculture department; introduced regulations of working hours and workplace safety for women and young workers; introduced measures empowering women to become their children’s legal guardian and compelling payments from delinquent men to support their families; instituted system of children aid societies and of foster-homes; introduced the secret ballot in elections and extended suffrage beyond property owners; established the Ontario School of Agriculture, Ontario School of Art and the School of Practical Science; created the municipal level of government; 1894 Ontario prohibition plebiscite. Retired to enter federal politics. Was appointed lieutenant governor of Ontario in 1897. | | | | | |
| 4 | | Arthur Sturgis Hardy (1837–1901) | 21 July 1896 – 21 October 1899 | Appointment (8th Leg.) 1898 election (9th Leg.) | Liberal | MLA for Brant South | Hardy ministry | |
| 5 | | Sir George William Ross (1841–1914) | 21 October 1899 – 8 February 1905 | Appointment (9th Leg.) 1902 election (10th Leg.) | Liberal | MLA for Middlesex West | Ross ministry | |
| 5 | | Sir George William Ross (1841–1914) | Expanded libraries, kindergarten, and university grants; 1902 Ontario prohibition referendum | | | | | |
| 6 | | Sir James Whitney (1843–1914) | 8 February 1905 – 25 September 1914 | 1905 election (11th Leg.) 1908 election (12th Leg.) 1911 election (13th Leg.) 1914 election (14th Leg.) | Conservative | MLA for Dundas | Whitney ministry | |
| 6 | | Sir James Whitney (1843–1914) | Hydro-Electric Power Commission of Ontario; Workmen's Compensation Act; temperance legislation; Regulation 17; Only Premier to die in office (1914). | | | | | |
| 7 | | Sir William Hearst (1864–1941) | 2 October 1914 – 14 November 1919 | Appointment (14th Leg.) | Conservative | MLA for Sault Ste. Marie | Hearst ministry | |
| 7 | | Sir William Hearst (1864–1941) | Ontario Temperance Act; expanded workers injury compensation; allowed woman suffrage; 1919 Ontario prohibition referendum | | | | | |
| 8 | | Ernest Drury (1878–1968) | 14 November 1919 – 16 July 1923 | 1919 election (15th Leg.) | United Farmers | MLA for Halton | Drury ministry | |
| 8 | | Ernest Drury (1878–1968) | Led a Coalition between the United Farmers party and the Labour MLAs; did not win a seat in the legislature until a 1920 by-election; created the first Department of Welfare; set a minimum wage for women; expanded Ontario Hydro; created the Province of Ontario Savings Office; began the first major reforestation program in North America; 1921 Ontario prohibition referendum | | | | | |
| 9 | | Howard Ferguson (1870–1946) | 16 July 1923 – 15 December 1930 | 1923 election (16th Leg.) 1926 election (17th Leg.) 1929 election (18th Leg.) | Conservative (Ldr. 1920) | MLA for Grenville | Ferguson ministry | |
| 9 | | Howard Ferguson (1870–1946) | Relaxed Regulation 17; created the Liquor Control Board of Ontario; 1924 Ontario prohibition referendum | | | | | |
| 10 | | George Stewart Henry (1871–1958) | 15 December 1930 – 10 July 1934 | Appointment (18th Leg.) | Conservative | MLA for York East | Henry ministry | |
| 10 | | George Stewart Henry (1871–1958) | Expansion of highway system, including construction of what became the Queen Elizabeth Way | | | | | |
| 11 | | Mitchell Hepburn (1896–1953) | 10 July 1934 – 21 October 1942 | 1934 election (19th Leg.) 1937 election (20th Leg.) | Liberal (Ldr. 1930) | MLA for Elgin (MPP after 1938) | Hepburn ministry | |
| 11 | | Mitchell Hepburn (1896–1953) | Greatly cutting government spending; succession tax; compulsory milk pasteurization; relaxed temperance laws; made the Dionne Quintuplets wards of the state; unsuccessfully tried to break the first United Auto Workers strike against GM; closed Chorley Park; conflict with PM Mackenzie King over conduct of WWII and conscription. | | | | | |
| 12 | | Gordon Daniel Conant (1885–1953) | 21 October 1942 – 18 May 1943 | Appointment (20th Leg.) | Liberal | MPP for Ontario | Conant ministry | |
| 12 | | Gordon Daniel Conant (1885–1953) | "Appointed" premier by Liberal leader Mitchell Hepburn but forced to call and contest leadership convention due to caucus revolt, which he lost to Nixon. | | | | | |
| 13 | | Harry Nixon (1891–1961) | 18 May 1943 – 17 August 1943 | Appointment (20th Leg.) | Liberal (Ldr. 1943) | MPP for Brant | Nixon ministry | |
| 13 | | Harry Nixon (1891–1961) | Long-time minister in UFO and Liberal governments. Called an election immediately after becoming premier and led his government to defeat. Shortest-serving Ontario premier but went on to be Ontario's longest-serving MPP. | | | | | |
| 14 | | George A. Drew (1894–1973) | 17 August 1943 – 19 October 1948 | 1943 election (21st Leg.) 1945 election (22nd Leg.) 1948 election (23rd Leg.) | Progressive Conservative (Ldr. 1938) | MPP for High Park | Drew ministry | ^α |
| 14 | | George A. Drew (1894–1973) | Began a 42-year Conservative dynasty; Drew Regulation; LeBel Royal Commission; joined Ontario to North American power grid, increased provincial share of Education spending; opened immigration offices in UK and arranged for cheap charter flights to bring 20,000 British immigrants to Ontario. | | | | | |
| 15 | | Thomas Laird Kennedy (1878–1959) | 19 October 1948 – 4 May 1949 | Appointment (23rd Leg.) | Progressive Conservative | MPP for Peel | Kennedy ministry | |
| 15 | | Thomas Laird Kennedy (1878–1959) | Interim leader between resignation of Drew and leadership convention to choose his successor. | | | | | |
| 16 | | Leslie Frost (1895–1973) | 4 May 1949 – 8 November 1961 | Appointment (23rd Leg.) 1951 election (24th Leg.) 1955 election (25th Leg.) 1959 election (26th Leg.) | Progressive Conservative (Ldr. 1949) | MPP for Victoria | Frost ministry | |
| 16 | | Leslie Frost (1895–1973) | 400-series highways; Provincial Sales Tax; public hospital insurance which would become OHIP; Expansion of universities; Fair Employment Practices Act and Fair Accommodation Practices Act and Ontario Human Rights Commission created; Voting rights for First Nations; Creation of Metropolitan Toronto and Toronto's first subway. | | | | | |
| 17 | | John Robarts (1917–1982) | 8 November 1961 – 1 March 1971 | Appointment (26th Leg.) 1963 election (27th Leg.) 1967 election (28th Leg.) | Progressive Conservative (Ldr. 1961) | MPP for London North | Robarts ministry | |
| 17 | | John Robarts (1917–1982) | Ontario Human Rights Code; 1967 "Confederation of Tomorrow" conference; Ontario Housing Corporation created; French education in Ontario schools; Creation of Ontario Health Insurance Plan; Creation of community college system; Creation of TVOntario; Creation of GO Transit; Creation of the Ontario Science Centre. | | | | | |
| 18 | | Bill Davis (1929–2021) | 1 March 1971 – 8 February 1985 | Appointment (28th Leg.) 1971 election (29th Leg.) 1975 election (30th Leg.) 1977 election (31st Leg.) 1981 election (32nd Leg.) | Progressive Conservative (Ldr. 1971) | MPP for Peel North (1971-1975) MPP for Brampton (1975-1985) | Davis ministry | |
| 18 | | Bill Davis (1929–2021) | Spadina Expressway; rejected (1971) then later partly extended (1984); full funding to Ontario's Catholic high schools; expansion of health care and education; extension of Ontario Human Rights Code provisions; expansion of French-language services; new regional governments; Rent controls; social housing expansion; Played a key role in patriation of the Canadian Constitution. | | | | | |
| 19 | | Frank Miller (1927–2000) | 8 February 1985 – 26 June 1985 | Appointment (32nd Leg.) 1985 election (33rd Leg.) | Progressive Conservative (Ldr. 1985) | MPP for Muskoka | Miller ministry | |
| 19 | | Frank Miller (1927–2000) | Lost a motion of no confidence immediately after the election and resigned power to the opposition party. | | | | | |
| 20 | | David Peterson (b. 1943) | 26 June 1985 – 1 October 1990 | Appointment (33rd Leg.) 1987 election (34th Leg.) | Liberal (Ldr. 1982) | MPP for London Centre | Peterson ministry | |
| 20 | | David Peterson (b. 1943) | Had the second-most seats in the 33rd assembly, but formed an accord with the New Democratic Party that would let the Liberal Party take power without forming an official coalition. Banned extra-billing by doctors and ended health insurance premiums. Reforms to rent laws, labour negotiation laws, pensions, environment; implemented extension of Catholic school funding to grade 13 announced by previous government; supported the Meech Lake Accord; Introduced no-fault auto insurance; Patti Starr scandal | | | | | |
| 21 | | Bob Rae (b. 1948) | 1 October 1990 – 26 June 1995 | 1990 election (35th Leg.) | New Democratic (Ldr. 1982) | MPP for York South | Rae ministry | |
| 21 | | Bob Rae (b. 1948) | Social Contract and clash with unions; Rae days; Pay equity; Affirmative action; Strengthening of rent control; anti-scab legislation; Reserve status for North Ontario Aboriginals; Moratorium on new nuclear plants; Attempted to maintain ban on Sunday shopping before allowing it; Introduction of casinos; Attempted to bring in extension of spousal benefits for same-sex partners. | | | | | |
| 22 | | Mike Harris (b. 1945) | 26 June 1995 – 14 April 2002 | 1995 election (36th Leg.) 1999 election (37th Leg.) | Progressive Conservative (Ldr. 1990) | MPP for Nipissing | Harris ministry | |
| 22 | | Mike Harris (b. 1945) | Common Sense Revolution; 30% tax cut; 21% cut to social assistance rates; attempted to introduce Workfare; cancelled urban infrastructure projects including Eglinton subway; cut government spending; downloading of Ontario Housing to municipalities; provincial funding for municipal transit reduced; Telehealth Ontario created; division of Ontario Hydro; municipal amalgamations, including Amalgamation of Toronto; Elimination of OAC year (Grade 13) and re-introduction of standardized testing; privatization of Highway 407; Ipperwash Crisis; teacher strikes; $1B cut from Education; Walkerton Tragedy; Ontario's Drive Clean; hospital closures and health restructuring. | | | | | |
| 23 | | Ernie Eves (b. 1946) | 15 April 2002 – 22 October 2003 | Appointment (37th Leg.) | Progressive Conservative (Ldr. 2002) | MPP for Dufferin—Peel—Wellington—Grey | Eves ministry | |
| 23 | | Ernie Eves (b. 1946) | Kimberly Rogers and welfare reform; Possible sale of Hydro One and problem with hydro costs due to hot summers and 2003 North America blackout. | | | | | |
| 24 | | Dalton McGuinty (b. 1955) | 23 October 2003 – 11 February 2013 | 2003 election (38th Leg.) 2007 election (39th Leg.) 2011 election (40th Leg.) | Liberal (Ldr. 1996) | MPP for Ottawa South | McGuinty ministry | |
| 24 | | Dalton McGuinty (b. 1955) | Green Energy and Economy Act; Auto insurance reforms; Cancelled tax cuts; Increase in health spending and Health Premium tax; Transfer of gas tax to municipalities; Breed-specific legislation aka ban on/government-sanctioned euthanization of 'pit bulls' and dogs considered to resemble 'pit bulls'; Established the Greenbelt; Renegotiation of federal equalization; Expansion of Ontario's Drive Clean; full-day kindergarten; MoveOntario; eHealth Ontario scandal; Harmonized Sales Tax; Ontario power plant scandal. On October 15, 2012, resigned unexpectedly and proroged the legislature. | | | | | |
| 25 | | Kathleen Wynne (b. 1953) | 11 February 2013 – 29 June 2018 | Appointment (40th Leg.) 2014 election (41st Leg.) | Liberal (Ldr. 2013) | MPP for Don Valley West | Wynne ministry | |
| 25 | | Kathleen Wynne (b. 1953) | First female Premier of Ontario, first openly gay premier in Canada; Ontario-Québec Relations (500 megawatts (MW) of peak electricity sharing); Public Sector and MPP Accountability and Transparency Act; The Great Lakes Protection Act; $30-billion investment into transportation across the province; privatization of Hydro One; allowed beer and wine to be sold in certain grocery stores;implementation of controversial updated sex education in public schools; raised the minimum wage in Ontario to $14; created the OHIP+ program to provide prescription drugs free for youth under 25; conflicted with the Auditor General and Financial Accountability Office over budgeting. On June 7, 2018, led party to worst defeat of a governing party in Ontario history. | | | | | |
| 26 | | Doug Ford (b. 1964) | 29 June 2018 – incumbent | 2018 election (42nd Leg.) 2022 election (43rd Leg.) 2025 election (44th Leg.) | Progressive Conservative (Ldr. 2018) | MPP for Etobicoke North | Ford ministry | |
| 26 | | Doug Ford (b. 1964) | Cancelled the provincial cap and trade system. Cut Toronto City Council from 47 to 25 wards. Buck-a-beer. Reduced the small business tax rate by 8.7%. Introduced free dental care for low-income seniors. Oversaw Ontario's response to the COVID-19 pandemic. Removed passenger vehicle licence plate renewal fees. Raised the provincial minimum wage to $15 per hour in January 2022, $16.55 in October 2023, $17.20 in October 2024, $17.60 in October 2025, and $17.95 in October 2026. Ontario Corps established. Closed the Ontario Science Centre. Involved with Greenbelt scandal. Leased Ontario Place to Therme Canada for redevelopment. | | | | | |
^{α} Party won the election, but premier lost own seat.

== List of premiers by time in office ==
| Rank | Premier | Length of tenure | Dates in office | Mandates | Party |
|---|---|---|---|---|---|
| 1 | Oliver Mowat | 23 years, 270 days | 1872–1896 | 6 | Liberal |
| 2 | Bill Davis | 13 years, 344 days | 1971–1985 | 4 | Progressive Conservative |
| 3 | Leslie Frost | 12 years, 188 days | 1949–1961 | 3 | Progressive Conservative |
| 4 | James Whitney | 9 years, 229 days | 1905–1914 | 4 | Conservative |
| 5 | John Robarts | 9 years, 113 days | 1961–1971 | 2 | Progressive Conservative |
| 6 | Dalton McGuinty | 9 years, 111 days | 2003–2013 | 3 | Liberal |
| 7 | Doug Ford (incumbent) | 8 years, 116 days | 2018–present | 3 | Progressive Conservative |
| 8 | Mitchell Hepburn | 8 years, 103 days | 1934–1942 | 2 | Liberal |
| 9 | Howard Ferguson | 7 years, 152 days | 1923–1930 | 3 | Conservative |
| 10 | Mike Harris | 6 years, 292 days | 1995–2002 | 2 | Progressive Conservative |
| 11 | Kathleen Wynne | 5 years, 138 days | 2013–2018 | 1 | Liberal |
| 12 | George William Ross | 5 years, 110 days | 1899–1905 | 1 | Liberal |
| 13 | David Peterson | 5 years, 97 days | 1985–1990 | 1 (Note: Frank Miller's Progressive Conservative Party won a plurality of seats in the 1985 Ontario general election, but the resulting 33rd Parliament of Ontario passed a motion of no confidence against him less than two months into his mandate, replacing his government with David Peterson's Liberal Party. This table counts the 1985 election as a mandate for Miller.) | Liberal |
| 14 | George A. Drew | 5 years, 63 days | 1943–1948 | 3 | Progressive Conservative |
| 15 | William Howard Hearst | 5 years, 43 days | 1914–1919 | 0 | Conservative |
| 16 | Bob Rae | 4 years, 268 days | 1990–1995 | 1 | New Democratic |
| 17 | John Sandfield Macdonald | 4 years, 157 days | 1867–1871 | 1 | Conservative |
| 18 | Ernest Charles Drury | 3 years, 244 days | 1919–1923 | 1 | United Farmers |
| 19 | George Stewart Henry | 3 years, 207 days | 1930–1934 | 0 | Conservative |
| 20 | Arthur Sturgis Hardy | 3 years, 92 days | 1896–1899 | 1 | Liberal |
| 21 | Ernie Eves | 1 year, 190 days | 2002–2003 | 0 | Progressive Conservative |
| 22 | Edward Blake | 310 days | 1871–1872 | 1 | Liberal |
| 23 | Gordon Daniel Conant | 209 days | 1942–1943 | 0 | Liberal |
| 24 | Thomas Laird Kennedy | 197 days | 1948–1949 | 0 | Progressive Conservative |
| 25 | Frank Miller | 138 days | 1985 | 1 | Progressive Conservative |
| 26 | Harry Nixon | 91 days | 1943 | 0 | Liberal |

== See also ==
- Politics of Ontario
- List of leaders of the opposition in Ontario

For more lists of this type, see Lists of incumbents.

== Sources ==
- "Ontario". The Canadian Encyclopedia.
- Government of Ontario. "Historical Records". Past & Present MPPs. Legislative Assembly of Ontario. Archived from the original on 2007-03-16.
