= Scott Act =

Scott Act may refer to:

- Scott Act (1863), which guaranteed the right to separate schools in what became Ontario, Canada, named for Richard William Scott
- Scott Act (1878), the Canada Temperance Act in the Dominion of Canada, also named for Richard William Scott
- Scott Act (1888), an American law prohibiting immigration of virtually all Chinese by rescinding certificates of reentry for Chinese who were then abroad
