= Ontario Temperance Act =

1916 Canadian law prohibiting alcohol

The Ontario Temperance Act is a law passed in 1916 that led to the prohibition of alcohol in Ontario, Canada. When the Act was first enacted, the sale of alcohol was prohibited, but liquor could still be manufactured in the province or imported. Strong support for prohibition came from religious elements of society such as the Ontario Woman's Christian Temperance Union, which sought to eliminate what it considered the societal ills and vices associated with liquor consumption, including violent behaviour and familial abuse. Historically, prohibition advocates in Ontario drew inspiration from the temperance movements in Britain and the United States. The Act was repealed in 1927.

== History ==
In 1864, the Dunkin Act enabled any municipality or county in the united Province of Canada (which included territory that what would become the Province of Ontario in 1867) to hold a majority vote to prohibit the sale of alcohol. In 1878, the Scott Act extended "local option" to the whole Dominion of Canada. Prior to the Ontario Temperance Act, two attempts failed to control or eliminate the sale of alcohol in the province. A non-binding plebiscite in 1894 failed because Judicial Committee of the Privy Council rulings disallowed provincial control over the importation of alcohol. Another attempt in 1902 failed because of low voter turnout, with less than half of those eligible participating. In the early 20th century, an increasing number of Ontario localities went "dry"; by 1914, 520 localities had banned the sale of alcohol, and only 322 were "wet". When the Ontario Temperance Act was passed, three Ontario counties had used the Scott Act to implement their own prohibition laws.

When William Hearst became premier of Ontario in September 1914, the temperance movement gained an ally, despite complaints from wet elements of Hearst's own Conservative Party. The onset of World War I gave advocates further impetus to push the cause by arguing that temperance would reduce waste, inefficiency, and distractions. In 1916, the Legislative Assembly of Ontario unanimously passed the Ontario Temperance Act. In March 1918, the Government of Canada issued an order-in-council that prohibited the manufacture, importation, and transportation of alcohol into Ontario and other provinces in which the purchase was illegal. Nonetheless, Ontarians could still acquire alcohol from doctors' offices, and drugstores. In 1920 alone, Ontario doctors wrote more than 650,000 prescriptions for alcohol.

Federal prohibition was repealed at the end of 1919. That year, a province-wide referendum saw support of the Ontario ban on sales by a majority of 400,000 votes. The manufacture and the export of liquor was made legal. In 1921, another referendum showed a slight slip in support for prohibition, but the province now became "bone dry" by banning the importation of alcohol. Another referendum two years later showed a greater slip in support for the Act, with 51.5 percent for and 48.5 against. In 1926, Howard Ferguson's Conservatives won a general election after it had promised the introduction of liquor sales in the province.

== Repeal and government as alcohol retailer ==
In 1927, the Liquor Control Act overturned prohibition as legislated in the Ontario Temperance Act and established the Liquor Control Board of Ontario (LCBO), through which the province managed liquor distribution with government-run stores. Nonetheless, drinking in public establishments remained illegal until seven years later. Some communities maintained a ban on the sale of liquor under local option until the 1970s and The Junction neighbourhood of Toronto remained "dry" until 2000, largely because of the efforts of former Ontario CCF Member of Provincial Parliament for High Park, "Temperance Bill" William Temple.

The Ontario Temperance Act failed because of changing public opinion and the inability of the Government of Ontario to effectively control consumption and importation of alcohol into the province. According to one historian, "the legislation seemed to be too drastic for the average citizen and not harsh enough to stop the large bootleggers." It has been also noted that prohibition deprived the Government of Ontario of significant tax revenue and reinstating those revenues was a motive to repeal.

== See also ==
- Canada Temperance Act
- 1894 Ontario prohibition plebiscite
- 1902 Ontario prohibition referendum
- 1919 Ontario prohibition referendum
- 1921 Ontario prohibition referendum
- 1924 Ontario prohibition referendum
- Prohibition in Canada
- Ontario (Attorney General) v. Canada Temperance Federation
- Attorney-General for Ontario v. Attorney-General for the Dominion
- William Raney#Embarrassments surrounding activities of The Reverend J O L Spracklin
