= Repeal of alcohol prohibition =

Repeal of alcohol prohibition may refer to:

- Repeals in the various Canadian provinces, Prohibition in Canada § Repeal
- Repeal in the United States, accomplished by the Twenty-first Amendment to the United States Constitution.
