= 1919 Ontario prohibition referendum =

Ontario, Canada referendum

October 20, 1919

Repeal of Ontario Temperance Act
Yes	32.4%
No	67.6%

Sale of light beer through government agencies
Yes	35.2%
No	64.8%

Sale of light beer at hotels
Yes	33.8%
No	66.2%

Sale of liquor through government agencies
Yes	39.3%
No	60.7%

A referendum was held in Ontario, Canada on October 20, 1919 (in conjunction with the 15th provincial election) on the legality of alcoholic beverages and the maintaining of prohibition. Prohibition had been passed by the provincial government in 1916 under the Ontario Temperance Act, though a clause required a referendum to be held in 1919 on whether the Act should be repealed and the previous licensing laws subsequently revived. A subsequent Act in 1919 provided three further questions for consideration, and subsequent implementation on approval. A majority voted against all four questions, and prohibition was maintained.

== Referendum questions ==
1. Are you in favour of the repeal of the Ontario Temperance Act?
2. Are you in favour of the sale of light beer containing not more than two and fifty-one hundredths per cent alcohol weight measure through Government agencies and amendments to the Ontario Temperance Act to permit such sale?
3. Are you in favour of the sale of light beer containing not more than two and fifty-one hundredths per cent alcohol weight measure in standard hotels in local municipalities that by a majority vote favour such sale and amendments to the Ontario Temperance Act to permit such sale?
4. Are you in favour of the sale of spirituous and malt liquors through Government agencies and amendments to the Ontario Temperance Act to permit such sale?

Unlike past prohibition referendums, the four questions were binding upon receiving a majority vote.

== Results ==
Referendum results
Question	Total votes	Yes		No	
Question	Total votes	Votes	%	Votes	%
1	1,141,595	369,434	32.4	772,161	67.6
2	1,142,900	401,893	35.2	741,007	64.8
3	1,142,613	386,680	33.8	755,933	66.2
4	1,142,894	449,370	39.3	693,524	60.7

As the majority voted no on all four questions, prohibition was not repealed.

== Gallery ==
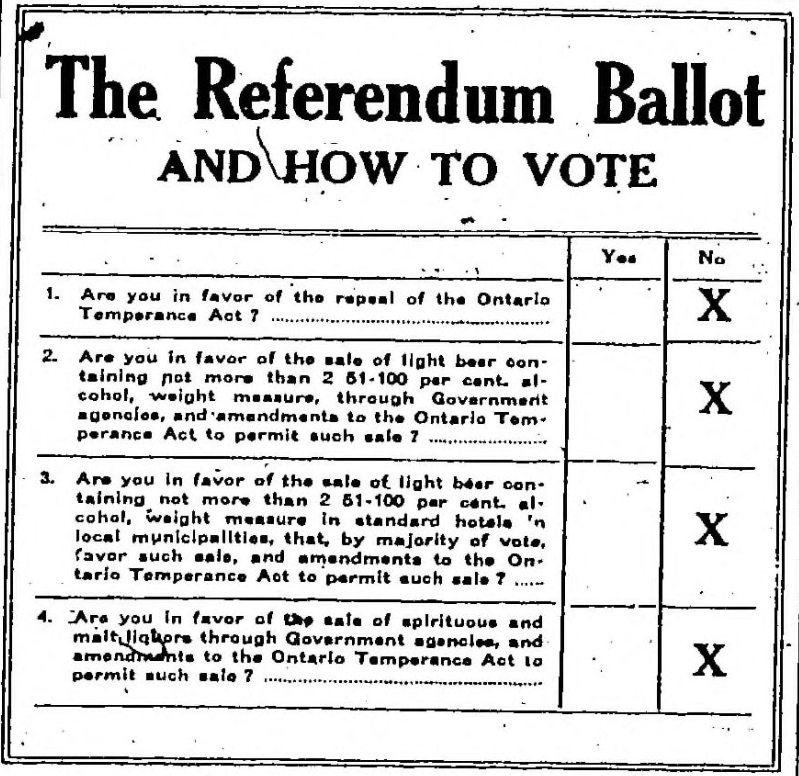
1919 Ontario referendum ballot, with suggested answers, as shown in The Acton Free Press (October 16, 1919)

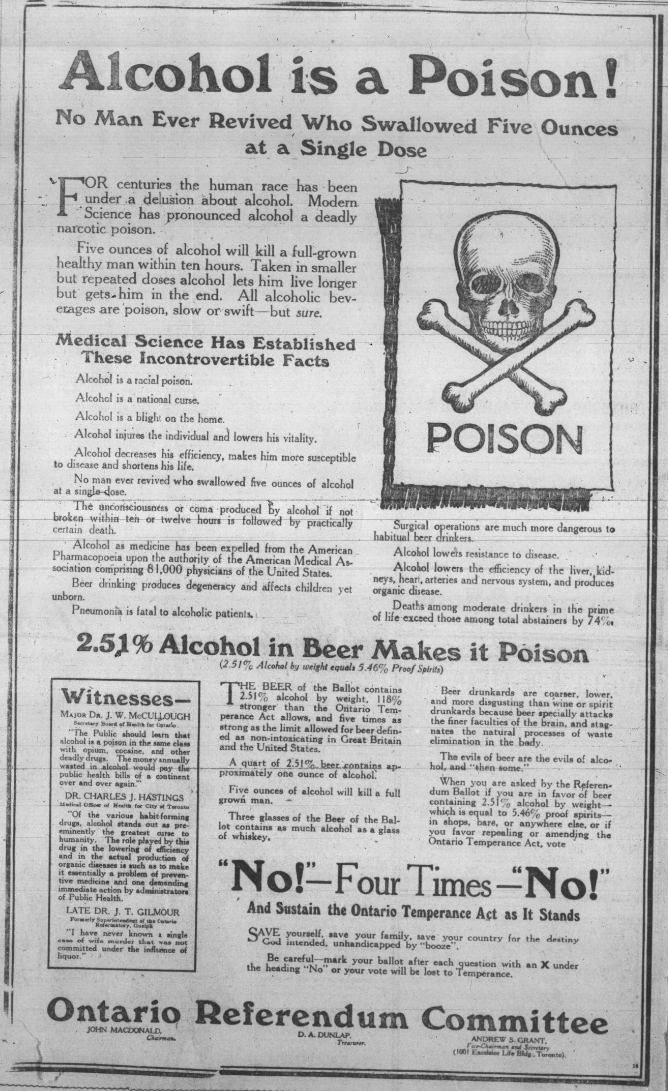
A 1919 newspaper advertisement by the Ontario Referendum Committee in support of the Ontario Temperance Act

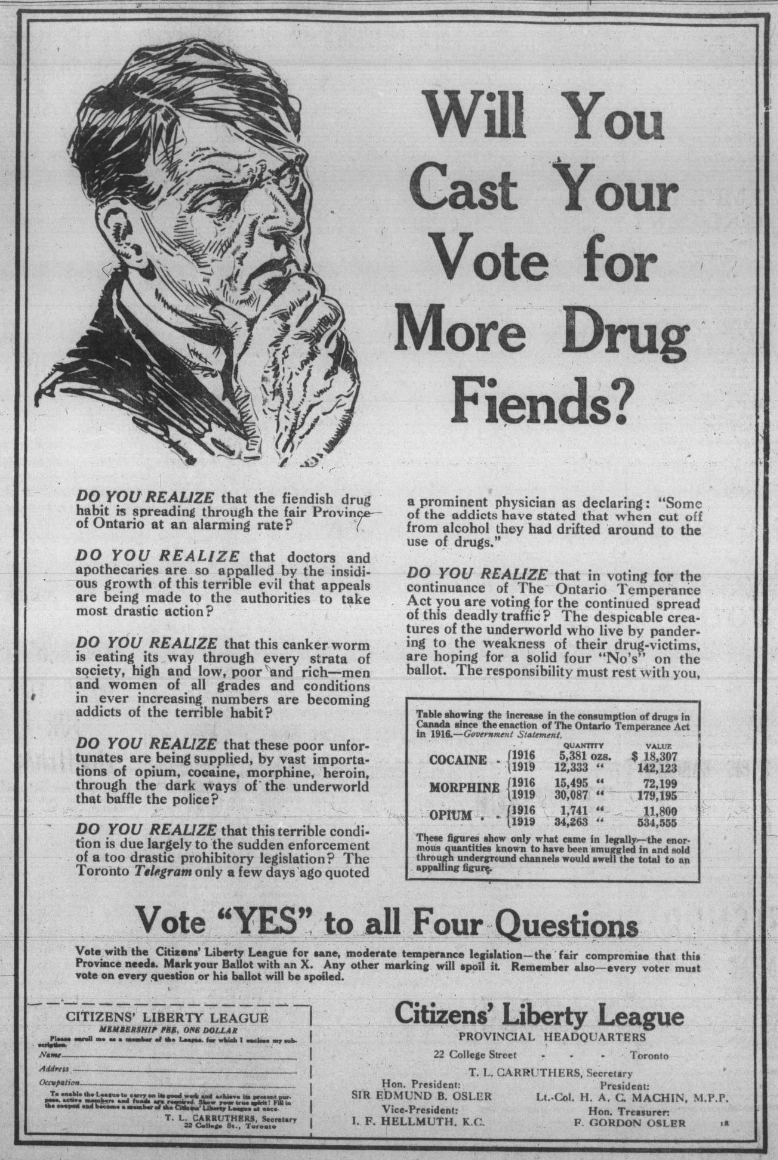
A 1919 advertisement by the Citizens' Liberty League in its campaign to repeal Prohibition in Ontario

== See also ==
- Prohibition in Canada
- Canada Temperance Act
- 1894 Ontario prohibition plebiscite
- 1902 Ontario prohibition referendum
- 1921 Ontario prohibition referendum
- 1924 Ontario prohibition referendum

== Bibliography ==
- Johnston, Larry; Sage, Rick (2007). "Referendums in Ontario: An Historical Summary" (PDF). Legislative Assembly of Ontario. Archived from the original (PDF) on September 20, 2007.
