= 1924 Ontario prohibition referendum =

Ontario, Canada referendum

October 23, 1924
- 1. Are you in favour of the continuance of the Ontario Temperance Act?; 2. Are you in favour of the sale as a beverage of beer and spirituous liquor in sealed packages under government control?

Results
Choice	Votes	%
Continuance of prohibition	585,676	51.49%
Legalization of alcohol sales	551,761	48.51%

A referendum was held on October 23, 1924 on the repeal of the Ontario Temperance Act. The referendum was brought about by a clause in the Act, which permitted the possible repeal of prohibition by a majority vote. The referendum upheld prohibition, albeit by the narrowest majority of all of Ontario's prohibition referendums; in 1927, prohibition would be repealed with the passing of the Liquor Licence Act.

== Referendum question ==
1. Are you in favour of the continuance of the Ontario Temperance Act?
2. Are you in favour of the sale as a beverage of beer and spirituous liquor in sealed packages under government control?

Unlike past referendums, the 1924 referendum was not a yes–no question; instead, voters indicated their support for either the first statement or the second.

== Results ==
1924 Ontario referendum - analysis of results
Choice	All ridings		Ridings for OTA			Ridings for Govt control		
Choice	Votes	%	Ridings	Votes	%	Ridings	Votes	%
Ontario Temperance Act	585,676	51.49	69	367,783	67.32	38	217,893	36.86
Government control	551,761	48.51	69	178,588	32.68	38	373,173	63.14
Total	1,137,437	100.00	69	546,371	100.00	38	591,066	100.00
Majority	33,915	2.98	69	189,185	34.64	38	155,280	26.28
Turnout	60.46%		69	65.86%		38	56.20%	

Temperance passed by the smallest majority of any of the prohibition referendums. The cities of Toronto, Hamilton, Ottawa and Windsor – areas where the ruling Conservative Party drew most of their support – voted overwhelmingly in favour of Question 2. Four months later, the party's throne speech announced intentions to begin debate on permitting the sale of a beer with a maximum alcohol content of 4.4%, which gained the nicknamed "Fergie's Foam" after Premier George Howard Ferguson. The government also declared that referendums on prohibition would no longer take place and the issue would be dealt with by the legislature.

In the subsequent 1926 election the Conservatives ran on a platform of repealing the Ontario Temperance Act, and maintained a majority while increasing their share of the popular vote by 7%. The Conservatives took the results as justification to repeal prohibition, and in 1927 passed the Liquor Licence Act. The act repealed the Ontario Temperance Act and created the Liquor Control Board of Ontario (LCBO), a crown corporation that brought about government control over the distribution of liquor. Brewers Retail Inc., a privately owned association of brewers overseen by the government, was created to regulate the sale of beer. While some communities would pressure local governments to limit the sale of liquor until as late as the 1990s, notably portions of west Toronto as a result of efforts by William Horace Temple, for all intents and purposes ended official temperance in Ontario had ended.

== See also ==
- Prohibition in Canada
- Canada Temperance Act
- 1894 Ontario prohibition plebiscite
- 1902 Ontario prohibition referendum
- 1919 Ontario prohibition referendum
- 1921 Ontario prohibition referendum
