= Liquor Licence Act (Ontario) =

Ontario, Canada statute

The Liquor Licence Act of Ontario (French: Loi sur les permis d'alcool) was a provincial act in Ontario dealing with licensing and possession of alcohol. In most cases, the Act impacted eateries requiring a licence to serve alcohol.

The Act's origins lie in the Prohibition period, when alcohol was deemed illegal. The Act was introduced in draft form in 1926 by the government of Premier George Howard Ferguson and passed quietly after the final reading on March 30, 1927. The Act helped establish the Liquor Control Board of Ontario to monitor and control the sale of liquor in the province. Later amendments created the Liquor Licensing Board of Ontario (now Alcohol and Gaming Regulation and Public Protection Act) in 1947, which is now responsible for licensing of establishments serving liquor.

Under the provisions of the Act, alcohol is still sold by the province at the LCBO, but also sold by non-government locations like The Beer Store (as Brewers Warehousing Company Limited in 1927); the Wine Rack and Vineyard Estates/Wine Country started as retail stores of Vincor and Andrew Peller wineries respectively before the province restricted growth of winery stores in 1987. Agency stores, small retailers licensed by the LCBO, appeared in 1962.

The Act was also used as the basis for qualification for provincial regulations, such as the Ontario Deposit Return Program.

Several revisions to the Act were made to reflect changes to liquor laws in Ontario, such as in 2015, when premier Kathleen Wynne and her advisor Ed Clark allowed the sale of six-packs of beer in Ontario grocery stores amid a Toronto Star exclusive on the anti-competitive practices made by The Beer Store. The changes took effect on December 15, 2015, when 58 grocery stores throughout the province began selling beer.

On November 29, 2021, the act was repealed and replaced with Liquor License and Control Act, 2019.

== See also ==
- Ontario Temperance Act 1916
