= Canada Temperance Act =

Repealed Canadian statute

Parliament of Canada
- Long title: An Act respecting the Traffic in Intoxicating Liquors
- Citation: S.C. 1878, c. 16
- Royal assent: 10 May 1878

Keywords
- Temperance
- Status: Repealed

The Canada Temperance Act (French: Loi de tempérance du Canada), (Note: originally enacted as Acte de tempérance du Canada) also known as the Scott Act, (Note: named after its sponsor Sir Richard William Scott) was an Act of the Parliament of Canada passed in 1878, which provided for a national framework for municipalities to opt in by plebiscite to a scheme of prohibition. It was repealed in 1984.

== Pre-Confederation colonial legislation ==
Temperance legislation of general application had been enacted by the various colonies as early as 1855, when New Brunswick implemented total prohibition to mixed success. Others, beginning with the Province of Canada on the passage of the Dunkin Act in 1864, named after its sponsor Christopher Dunkin, opted to allow local municipalities to implement temperance upon an approval by plebiscite.

The Act proved to be problematic in its operation following the division of the Province into Ontario and Quebec. In Ex parte O'Neill, RJQ 24 SC 304, it was held that the National Assembly of Quebec could not repeal the Dunkin Act, but it could pass a concurrent statute for regulating liquor traffic within the province. It was also later held that the Parliament of Canada could not repeal that Act with respect only to Ontario.

== Post-Confederation ==
The provinces continued to enact temperance legislation after the establishment of Canadian Confederation in 1867. Ontario passed the Crooks Act (Note: named after its sponsor Adam Crooks) in 1876 to provide for the limiting of licences granted by municipal councils in areas not otherwise subject to the Dunkin Act. The Parliament of Canada shortly followed afterwards with the passage of the Scott Act, which offered local option within a national scheme, followed in 1883 by the McCarthy Act, named after its sponsor, Dalton McCarthy, and its national licensing system. (Note: The Liquor License Act, 1883, S.C. 1883, c. 30 , subsequently declared unconstitutional in the McCarthy Act Reference.)

In 1917, provision was made to suspend the operation of the Act if provincial temperance legislation was determined to be as restrictive in application.

== Application ==
The Act was brought into effect in 17 municipalities:

Implementation of Canada Temperance Act
Province	Year	Area
New Brunswick	1879	Albert County
New Brunswick	1879	Carleton County
New Brunswick	1879	Kings County
New Brunswick	1879	Queens County
New Brunswick	1879	York County
New Brunswick	1880	Northumberland County
New Brunswick	1880	Westmorland County
Manitoba	1880	Electoral District of Marquette
Manitoba	1881	Electoral District of Lisgar
Nova Scotia	1881	Digby
Nova Scotia	1884	Yarmouth
Nova Scotia	1885	Guysborough
Quebec	1913	Thetford Mines
Ontario	1913	Manitoulin District
Ontario	1914	Huron County
Ontario	1914	Perth County (excluding Stratford)
Ontario	1915	Peel County

== Legal controversy ==
The Act was the subject of several constitutional challenges, many of which were of major importance in developing the jurisprudence underlying Canadian federalism:

- Severn v The Queen (holding that an Ontario Act requiring the licensing of liquor wholesalers and manufacturers was unconstitutional for infringing on the federal jurisdiction over trade and commerce)
- City of Fredericton v The Queen (the Supreme Court of Canada held that the Canada Temperance Act was a valid exercise of the trade and commerce power), later overturned by the Judicial Committee of the Privy Council in Russell v. The Queen (which declared that the Act fell under the power relating to peace, order and good government)
- Hodge v The Queen (which introduced the double aspect doctrine and declared that the provinces' jurisdiction under Section 92 was plenary in nature)
- the Local Prohibition Case (which held that prohibition fell under both federal and provincial jurisdiction and clarified the nature of both federal and provincial powers)

When prohibition in Ontario was relaxed in 1927, a reference question to the Supreme Court of Canada resulted in the 1935 finding that the Act still applied in the counties of Perth, Huron and Peel. A subsequent reference question by the Province of Ontario to the Ontario Court of Appeal resulted in a declaration that the Canada Temperance Act was constitutional, which was subsequently affirmed by the Judicial Committee of the Privy Council in 1946 in Ontario v. Canada Temperance Federation. Manitoulin and Peel would later hold plebiscites that revoked the application of the Act in December 1951, and Huron and Perth, the last jurisdictions in which the Act applied in Canada, would not do so until November 1959.

== Repeal ==
The Act remained on the statute books until its repeal in 1984.

== See also ==
- Prohibition in Canada
- 1894 Ontario prohibition plebiscite
- 1898 Canadian prohibition plebiscite
- 1902 Ontario prohibition referendum
- 1919 Quebec prohibition referendum
- 1919 Ontario prohibition referendum
- 1920 Canadian liquor plebiscite
- 1921 Ontario prohibition referendum
- 1924 Ontario prohibition referendum
- Ontario Temperance Act 1916
