= 1921 Ontario prohibition referendum =

April 18, 1921
- Shall the importation and the bringing of intoxicating liquors into the province be forbidden?

Results
Choice	Votes	%
Yes	540,773	59.12%
No	373,938	40.88%
Total votes	914,711	100.00%

A referendum was held in Ontario, Canada on April 18, 1921, concerning a ban on the importation of alcoholic beverages into the province. The referendum passed, and an importation ban was implemented.

== Referendum question ==
Shall the importation and the bringing of intoxicating liquors into the province be forbidden?

== History ==
Though the Judicial Committee of the Privy Council had ruled in 1896 that provinces do not have the authority to prohibit the importation of alcohol, the Canada Temperance Act allowed the federal government to enact a prohibition if a majority was reached in a referendum. Similar referendums had previously been undertaken in Alberta, Manitoba, Saskatchewan and Nova Scotia in 1920, and in New Brunswick and Prince Edward Island in 1921.

Initially, the Ontario referendum was to be held on the same day as those in Alberta, Manitoba, Saskatchewan and Nova Scotia. Concerns about the voter list eventually led to its rescheduling.

== Results ==
Response	# of votes polled	% of votes polled
Yes	540,773	59.1
No	373,938	40.9
Total	914,711	100.0

Total prohibition, or "bone-dry" prohibition, was brought into effect in Ontario. Though the provincial government was bound by the results, the enactment of an importation ban would be delayed.

== See also ==
- Prohibition in Canada
- Canada Temperance Act
- 1894 Ontario prohibition plebiscite
- 1902 Ontario prohibition referendum
- 1919 Ontario prohibition referendum
- 1924 Ontario prohibition referendum
