= 1894 Ontario prohibition plebiscite =

- January 1, 1894
- Are you in favour of the immediate prohibition by law, of the importation, manufacture and sale of intoxicating liquors as a beverage.

Results
Choice	Votes	%
Yes	192,489	63.48%
No	110,720	36.52%
Total votes	303,209	100.00%

A plebiscite on the legality of alcoholic beverages was held in Ontario, Canada on January 1, 1894. Per the terms of the Prohibition Plebiscite Act passed in 1893, a plebiscite was held on the issue of prohibition in conjunction with the 1894 municipal elections. Though a majority of voters indicated support for prohibition, the results were non-binding and prohibition would not occur in Ontario until 1916.

== Plebiscite question ==
An Act of the Legislature specified the form of the question posed:

Are you in favour of the immediate prohibition by law, of the importation, manufacture and sale of intoxicating liquors as a beverage.

Voting only occurred within the various constituted municipalities. Anyone who lived in unorganized areas of the Province was unable to participate.

== Results ==
Response	# of votes polled	% of votes polled
Yes	192,489	63.5
No	110,720	36.5
Total	303,209	100.0

Unmarried women and widows were permitted to vote in the plebiscite, though they voted in a ballot of a different colour (blue for women, yellow for men). Though the plebiscite passed, the results were non-binding and prohibition would not occur in Ontario until 1916. Provincial prohibition, though having majority support, would face another roadblock in 1896 when the Judicial Committee of the Privy Council determined that provinces do not have the authority to prohibit the importation of alcohol.

=== Analysis ===
1894 Ontario plebiscite - analysis of results by municipality
Type	Choice	All municipalities				Yes					No				
Type	Choice	Male	Female	Total	%	Municipalities	Male	Female	Total	%	Municipalities	Male	Female	Total	%
Counties	Yes	145,504	8,736	154,240	64.75	35	137,838	8,182	146,020	66.60	3	7,666	554	8,220	43.39
Counties	No	82,578	1,382	83,960	35.25	35	72,049	1,187	73,236	33.40	3	10,529	195	10,724	56.61
Counties	Total	228,082	10,118	238,200	100.00	35	209,887	9,369	219,256	100.00	3	18,195	749	18,944	100.00
Counties	Majority	62,926	7,354	70,280	29.50	35	65,789	6,995	72,784	33.20	3	2,863	(359)	2,504	13.22
Counties	Turnout	59.55%				35	59.62%				3	58.76%			
Districts	Yes	5,136	209	5,345	64.10	7	5,136	209	5,345	64.10	Nil				
Districts	No	2,951	42	2,993	35.90	7	2,951	42	2,993	35.90	Nil				
Districts	Total	8,087	251	8,338	100.00	7	8,087	251	8,338	100.00	Nil				
Districts	Majority	2,185	167	2,352	28.20	7	2,185	167	2,352	28.20	Nil				
Districts	Turnout	45.49%				7	45.49%				Nil				
Cities	Yes	27,045	3,091	30,136	57.87	11	26,447	3,015	29,462	58.19	1	598	76	674	46.42
Cities	No	21,219	724	21,943	42.13	11	20,495	670	21,165	41.81	1	724	54	778	53.58
Cities	Total	48,264	3,815	52,079	100.00	11	46,942	3,685	50,627	100.00	1	1,322	130	1,452	100.00
Cities	Majority	5,826	2,367	8,193	15.74	11	5,952	2,345	8,297	16.38	1	126	(22)	104	7.16
Cities	Turnout	50.96%				11	51.15%				1	45.39%			
Separated towns	Yes	2,402	366	2,768	60.28	6	2,201	340	2,541	62.71	2	201	26	227	42.04
Separated towns	No	1,746	78	1,824	39.72	6	1,437	74	1,511	37.29	2	309	4	313	57.96
Separated towns	Total	4,148	444	4,592	100.00	6	3,638	414	4,052	100.00	2	510	30	540	100.00
Separated towns	Majority	656	288	944	20.56	6	764	266	1,030	25.42	2	108	(22)	86	15.92
Separated towns	Turnout	51.84%				6	51.56%				2	54.04%			

Only three counties, one city and two separated towns voted No:

Counties

- Essex
- Prescott and Russell
- Waterloo

City

- Windsor

Separated towns

- Prescott
- Pelee Island

1894 Ontario plebiscite - analysis of total results
Choice	Group of municipalities	Male	Female	Total	%
Yes	Counties	145,504	8,736	154,240	
Yes	Districts	5,136	209	5,345	
Yes	Cities	27,045	3,091	30,136	
Yes	Separated towns	2,402	366	2,768	
Yes	Total	180,087	12,402	192,489	63.48
No	Counties	82,578	1,382	83,960	
No	Districts	2,951	42	2,993	
No	Cities	21,219	724	21,943	
No	Separated towns	1,746	78	1,824	
No	Total	108,494	2,226	110,720	36.52
Total votes		288,581	14,628	303,209	100.00
Majority		71,593	10,176	81,769	26.96
Turnout		57.26%			

== See also ==
- Prohibition in Canada
- Canada Temperance Act
- 1902 Ontario prohibition referendum
- 1919 Ontario prohibition referendum
- 1921 Ontario prohibition referendum
- 1924 Ontario prohibition referendum
