= 1902 Ontario prohibition referendum =

- December 4, 1902
- Are you in favour of bringing into force Part II of The Liquor Act, 1902?

Results
Choice	Votes	%
Yes	199,749	65.86%
No	103,548	34.14%
Total votes	303,297	100.00%
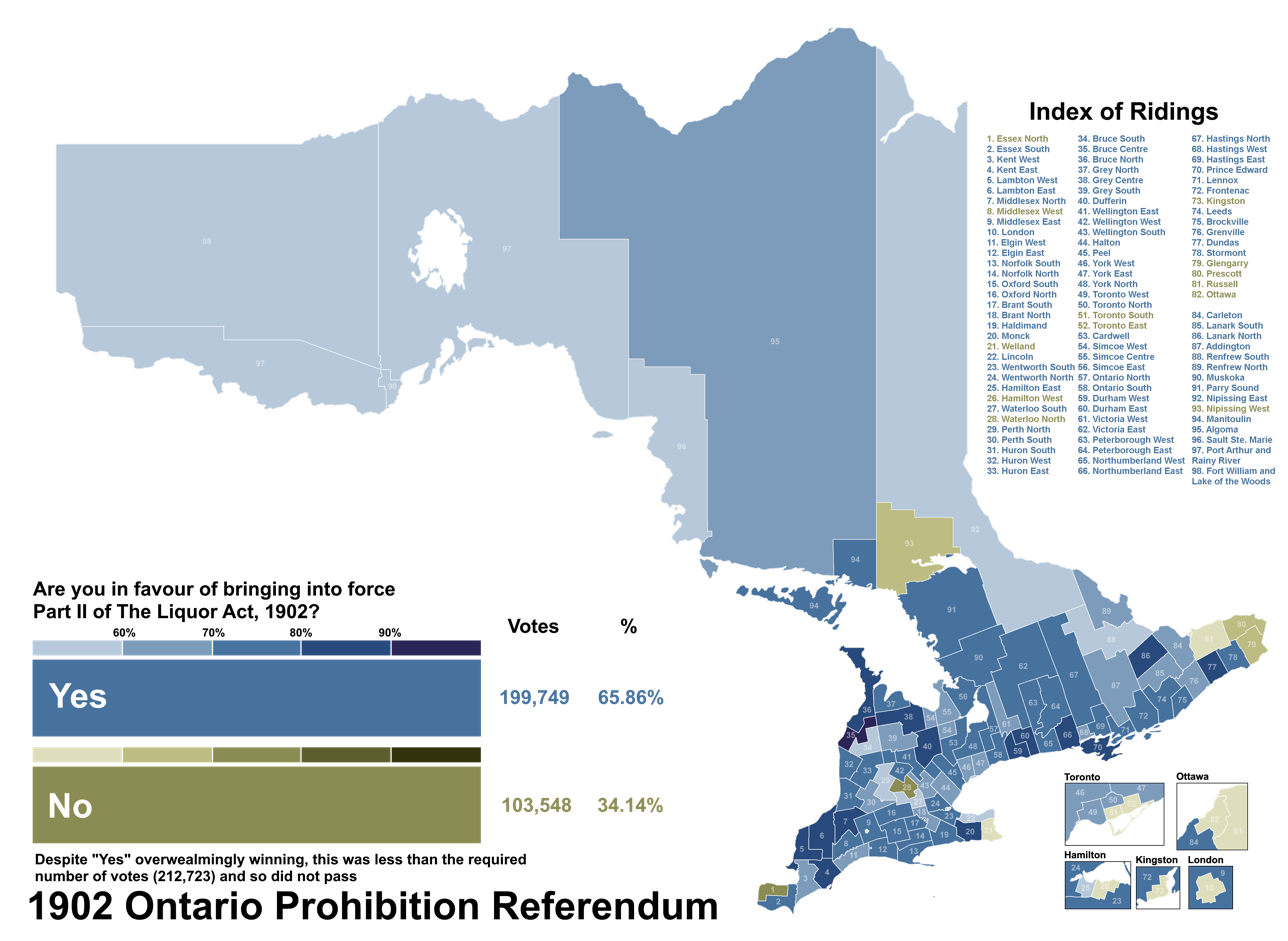
Yes
90–100%
80–90%
70–80%
60–70%
50–60%
No
90–100%
80–90%
70–80%
60–70%
50–60%

A referendum on the legality of alcoholic beverages was held in Ontario, Canada on December 4, 1902. Though 65 per cent of voters indicated support for prohibition, a majority of half of the number of voters in the 1898 election did not support the motion, and prohibition was not introduced.

== Referendum question ==
Are you in favour of bringing into force Part II of The Liquor Act, 1902?

The Judicial Committee of the Privy Council had previously ruled in 1896 that provinces do not have the authority to prohibit the importation of alcohol. Part II of the Liquor Act would authorize prohibition to the extent that Ontario would be allowed to enact, specifically a ban on the sale of alcohol in bars and retail establishments and the placement of restrictions on the sale of alcohol in restaurants.

The act provided that passage in the referendum was contingent on several conditions being met:

104. In case it appears from the said summary that a majority of the votes on the said question are in the affirmative and that the number of votes on the said question in the affirmative exceeds one half of the number of votes certified to by the Clerk of the Crown in Chancery as hereinafter mentioned, the Lieutenant-Governor in Council shall issue his Proclamation in the Ontario Gazette declaring Part II. of this Act to be in force on, from and after the first day of May, 1904, and Part II. of this Act shall come into force and take effect on, from and after the said date accordingly, but the provisions contained in said Part II. with respect to applications for license and all matters connected therewith or appertaining thereto, and with respect to the issue of such licenses may be resorted to, applied and followed at any time before the said first day of May for the purpose of procuring the issue of licenses under this Act to take effect on and from the said date.

(2) The Clerk of the Crown in Chancery shall certify under his hand and seal to the Lieutenant-Governor in Council the total number of votes arrived at by adding together

1. the votes polled for all of the candidates at the general election of members to serve in the Legislative Assembly in the year 1898 except in the Electoral District of Ottawa ;
2. one half of the votes polled for all the candidates in the said Electoral District of Ottawa; and
3. the number of votes polled at the last contested election held. prior to the said general election in every electoral district for which a candidate was returned in 1898 by acclamation.

== Results ==
1902 Ontario referendum - analysis of results
Choice	All ridings		Yes			No		
Choice	Votes	%	Ridings	Votes	%	Ridings	Votes	%
Yes	199,749	65.86	85	176,684	71.12	12	23,065	42.03
No	103,548	34.14	85	71,736	28.88	12	31,812	57.97
Total	303,297	100.00	85	248,420	100.00	12	54,877	100.00
Majority	96,201	31.72	85	104,948	42.24	12	8,747	15.94
Turnout	50.57%		85	49.70%		12	54.87%	

The Yes vote was less than the required threshold of 212,723, so prohibition was not adopted.

Only 12 of the 97 ridings voted No:

- Essex North
- Hamilton West
- Kingston
- London
- Nipissing West
- Ottawa
- Prescott
- Russell
- Toronto East
- Toronto South
- Waterloo North
- Welland

== See also ==
- Prohibition in Canada
- Canada Temperance Act
- 1894 Ontario prohibition plebiscite
- 1919 Ontario prohibition referendum
- 1921 Ontario prohibition referendum
- 1924 Ontario prohibition referendum
