= Ontario's Drive Clean =

Program to control vehicle emissions since 1999

Ontario's Drive Clean was an automobile emissions control program introduced by the Government of Ontario and came into effect April 1999, and cancelled 20 years later. The program was initially intended to weed out vehicles producing unrestrained amounts of particulate emissions contributing to smog and increasing pollution. It applies only to vehicles registered in southern parts of Ontario from Windsor to Ottawa due to the volume of vehicles in that part of the province. It is administered by privately owned facilities (such as auto repair shops and vehicle dealerships) that have been accredited by Ontario's Ministry of the Environment and Climate Change (MOECC) and the Ministry of Transportation (MTO).

At its inception, the program required light duty vehicles under 4,500 kg (cars, SUV, light trucks) that were over three years old to have an emissions test completed every two years (vehicles manufactured on even years are tested on odd years and vehicles manufactured on odd years are tested on even years) before the vehicle's owner or lessor can renew their licence plate. Vehicles that were manufactured up to and including 1988 are exempt as new vehicle emissions standards were coming into effect beginning in 1989. The minimum age for testing has been increased twice since the beginning of the program. As of 2011, vehicles that are over seven years old require emissions testing, however vehicles manufactured before 1988 are exempt from the test. On September 28, 2018, the Ontario government announced the cancellation of the Drive Clean program and instead focusing on heavy duty vehicles; the change became effective on April 1, 2019.

Heavy duty trucks and buses are also covered by the Drive Clean program. They are tested annually once the vehicle is more than one year old, with no age limit to testing; A 1975 diesel powered truck or bus would still be tested so long as it was still registered. All vehicles on Ontario roads are further monitored by a 'smog patrol' team for MOECC and can be stopped at random and roadside tested. The Smog Patrol team drive vehicles that are equipped with mobile testing equipment to perform roadside tests. The Smog Patrol can also perform a visual inspection to ensure all emissions control equipment is in place and functioning as originally built (tampering with or removing this equipment is an offence separate from Drive Clean but under the same Regulation). Some registrants circumvent an emissions test by registering their vehicles to addresses outside the Drive Clean testing areas. Circumventing an emissions test in this way is an offence and could result in a ticket or summons and could also result in licence plates being seized.

== Changing standards ==
The Drive Clean program has undergone several changes since its introduction in 1999. In 2003, standards for light-duty vehicles were tightened to require 11.5% lower vehicle emissions than the most stringent American Environmental Protection Agency (EPA) recommended standards. On November 18, 2005, the Minister of the Environment, announced several proposed changes to the Drive Clean program. Standards were tightened by a further 11.5%. Newer vehicles, which have a very high pass rate due to better emission control technology off the assembly line, were exempted from the program until they are seven years old.

== Critics ==
Critics have long argued against emissions testing, however the cost of equipment purchased to perform emissions tests in 1998/1999 would not be fully amortized until 2014 and therefore the program has been continued despite calls for its cancellation. As of 2015, Ontario was the only province in Canada requiring emissions testing on its vehicles, with British Columbia phasing out their program December 31, 2014.

In 2012, Ontario's Auditor General determined that the Drive Clean program, which was supposed to be revenue neutral had a surplus and was expected to have a surplus of $50M by 2018. As a result, the Government of Ontario reduced the price of emissions testing from $35 CAD to $30 CAD.

== Test accuracy ==
In 2014, testing methods were changed from tailpipe emissions testing to using the On Board Diagnostics (OBDII) port under the driver's side dashboard. OBDII was introduced in 1996 and became standard in 1997 on all new vehicles. Older vehicles that are not equipped with the OBDII port continue to be tested under the older tailpipe emissions platform.

Drive Clean's emissions test results have been shown to be unreliable in surveys carried out by the media such as in-depth work done by The Hamilton Spectator, the Fraser Institute, and consumer advocacy groups such as the Automobile Protection Association. In APA surveys, it was shown that the same car can have extremely variable results in test results (up to 800 percent in one survey), even at the same garage or on the same day with no work being carried out on the car. In 2004, the Ontario Auditor General reported on myriad cases of fraud within the Drive Clean program, such as test facilities (garages) that, for a fee, would test a clean car and report those results instead. Other test facilities would fail a well-tuned car to generate additional work. For these reasons and others, consumer reports suggest drivers try another garage if their car fails a Drive Clean test, before proceeding with expensive repairs.

== Equity concerns ==
Ontario's Drive Clean program provides no financial assistance to low-income drivers. This contrasts with otherwise similar mandatory emissions testing programs such as those in California, Texas and Arizona. Critics of Drive Clean, including the province's own consulting firm, the Eastern Research Group, have strongly recommended that financial assistance should be provided. The repair cost limit is about to triple since the program's inception (from $200 to $450, and a proposed $600 RCL) while emissions standards have simultaneously become 23% more stringent leading to a greater percentage of vehicles that fail emissions tests. The social welfare effect is similar to that of a regressive tax, one imposed on drivers who cannot afford newer cars. In 2006, some unofficial current estimates put the total cost of the program to Ontario motorists close to 2 billion dollars. The most recent verifiable figure, $1.1 billion (in 2004), consists of some $435 million in Drive Clean test fees, and about $690 million for repairs to vehicles that failed. Costs for preliminary repairs to vehicles in order to qualify for Drive Clean tests have never been included in these figures, such as repair or replacement of corroded exhaust system components. Drive Clean test facilities are free to refuse to test any vehicle until such preliminary repairs are made.

The Ontario government also has a program to purchase and scrap old polluting cars called Car Heaven. This program is sponsored by General Motors and Exxon-Mobil among others. It is structured in a way which will cost taxpayers little, and acts as a small incentive for people to scrap older cars. This has the effect of boosting prices for remaining used cars by reducing supply, making it somewhat more expensive for low-income persons to drive in Ontario. Currently, the average car donation to Car Heaven is 16 years old (model year 1990-1991). The typical vehicle donated to Car Heaven would otherwise have been on the road for three more years.

== Impacts on air pollution ==
Drive Clean's impact on air pollution in Ontario has been contested. Since its creation in 1999 the Ontario Medical Association and the Canadian Medical Association have each released estimates of the number of illnesses caused by air pollution in Ontario. The Ontario Medical Association estimated in 2005 that total air pollution (from all sources) would cause some 5,800 deaths and 17,000 hospital admissions that year. It also estimated that the direct health care costs of air pollution in Ontario were about $507 million, and the total economic cost of air pollution to be about $7.8 billion. However, three years later the Canadian Medical Association released a report that estimated that in 2008 there would be 4,597 hospital admissions in Ontario caused by air pollution, of which around 1,178 would result in acute premature death. It also suggested that in the year 2031 there would be 2,222 deaths in Ontario caused by air pollution, compared to 7,774 hospital admissions. In addition, the number of smog advisory days in Ontario peaked in 2005 at 53 days. In 2013, there were only two smog advisory days in Ontario. In addition, there were no smog days reported in 2015, according to a report by Air Quality Ontario

In late 2004, Norm Sterling, who was the Environment Minister in the Progressive Conservative premier Mike Harris's cabinet, stated that Drive Clean had already had its greatest impact on air pollution and had served its purpose. Sterling is often referred to as the founder of Drive Clean. Drive Clean can only address a small fraction of the total automobile emissions problem, because all internal combustion vehicles burn fuels which ultimately pollute the air (including most so-called "alternative" fuels).

The Greenpeace co-founder, Robert Hunter, wrote in 1999 that Drive Clean "has turned out to be an agonizing bureaucratic nightmare that hits drivers with what is basically another tax and a huge hassle, while accomplishing -- in Environmental Commissioner Eva Ligeti's assessment -- 'minimal benefits.'"

Critics of Drive Clean, who included Hunter and many other environmentalists argue that a greater long-term impact on overall air quality would result from reinvesting the same provincial resources towards encouraging low-emitter technologies, some of which offer electric power as an alternative to 100% internal combustion propulsion. There has been a call for the Ontario government to admit to Drive Clean's minimal impact, and to begin promoting low-emissions vehicles such as hybrid cars, plug-in hybrid electric vehicles, zero-emission vehicles such as the ill-fated General Motors EV1, and personal transports like the Segway PT. Unlike over 40 U.S. states, the Ontario government has banned low-speed electric vehicles citing "safety concerns". On March 23, 2006, Ontario's McGuinty government doubled their former $1,000 ceiling sales tax rebate on hybrid cars such as the Toyota Prius up to a maximum of $2,000, but stopped short of making such vehicles PST-free.

Politicians Norm Sterling and Howard Hampton have argued that diverting the same provincial funds used for paying for Drive Clean towards improving existing public transit networks might have yielded a far greater overall environmental benefit. Proper funding may have also acted to reduce the well-documented disproportional fare increases seen in Toronto from the Toronto Transit Commission (TTC) in recent years. The TTC has argued in the past that with riders covering more than 80 per cent of the cost of operating the TTC, it is by far the least-funded mass transit system in North America and one of the least-funded in the world. Another lost opportunity to reduce smog was the quiet shut-down of the Hamilton Street Railway's all-electric trolleybus routes in 1992. The Ontario government has however invested toward expanding public transit in Ontario. It agreed to fund a variety of transit projects under The Big Move.

== The future of Drive Clean ==
On June 7, 2010, the Ministry of Environment posted a request for proposals on MERX Canadian Public Tenders service. The modernized Drive Clean program, which was fully implemented on January 1, 2013, is intended to provide significant benefits by implementing OBD2 testing. Since January 1, 2013, the OBD2 testing has led to an average of 10% failure rate. On 1 April 2017, the $30 fee for a drive clean test was eliminated, however if failed the first time, $17.50 will be paid for subsequent tests. Vehicles manufactured before 1988 are exempt from the test.

On September 28, 2018, the Ontario government under Doug Ford announced the cancellation of the Drive Clean program and instead focusing on heavy duty vehicles; the change became effective on April 1, 2019.

== See also ==
- AirCare - a similar program in British Columbia
