= Prohibition in Canada =

Historic alcohol ban in Canada

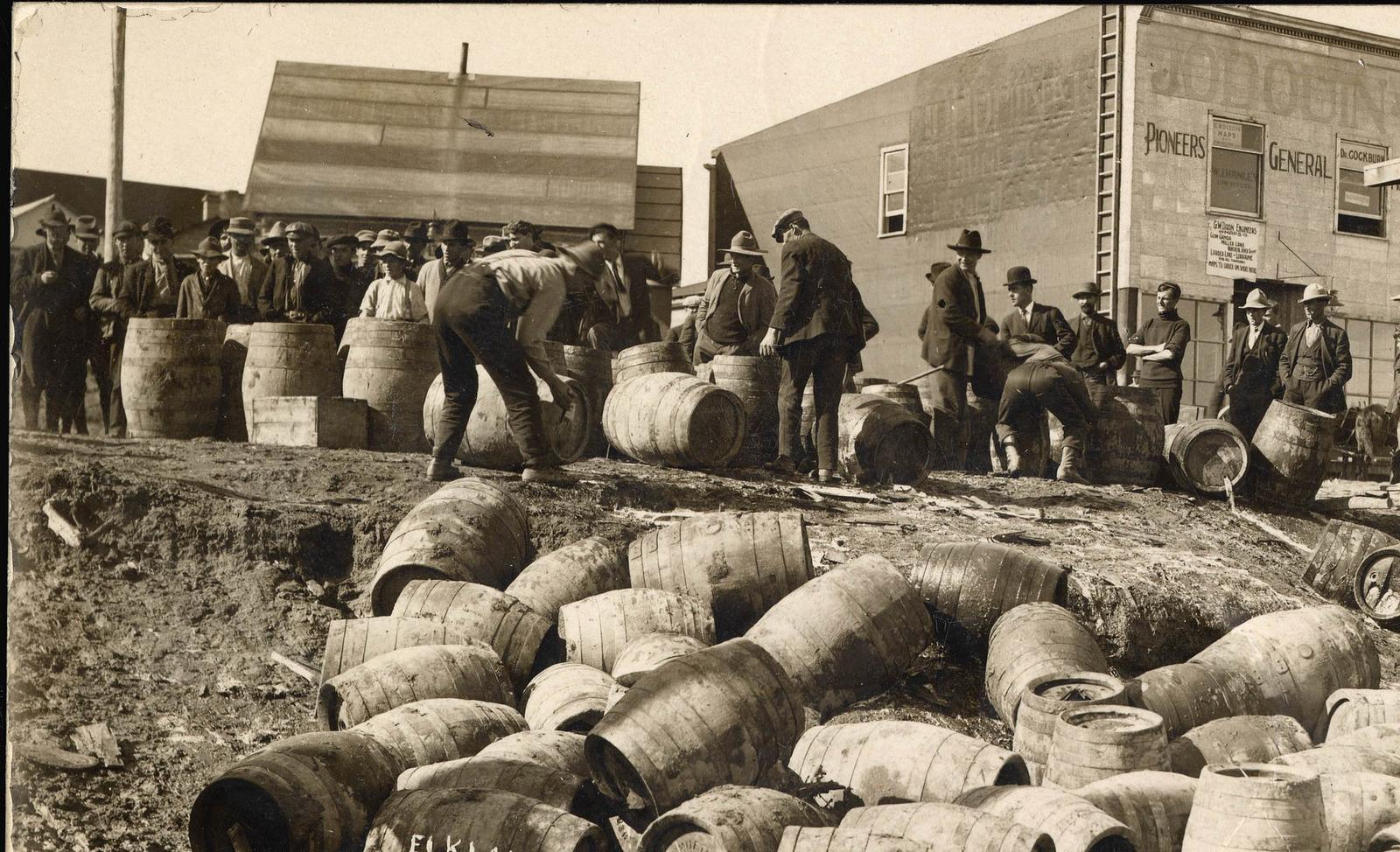
A police raid confiscating illegal alcoholic beverages, in Elk Lake, Ontario, in 1925

Prohibition in Canada was a ban on alcoholic beverages that arose in various stages, from local municipal bans in the late 19th century (extending to the present in some cases), to provincial bans in the early 20th century, and national prohibition (a temporary wartime measure) from 1918 to 1920. The relatively large and powerful beer and alcohol manufacturing sector, and the huge working class that purchased their products, failed to convince any of the governments to reverse their stance on prohibition. Most provinces repealed their bans in the 1920s, though alcohol was illegal in Prince Edward Island from 1901 to 1948. By comparison, the Ontario Temperance Act was in effect from 1916 to 1927.

As legislation prohibiting the consumption of alcohol was repealed, it was typically replaced with regulation imposing restrictions on the sale of alcohol to minors, and with excise taxes on alcoholic products.

== Origins ==
=== Temperance movement ===
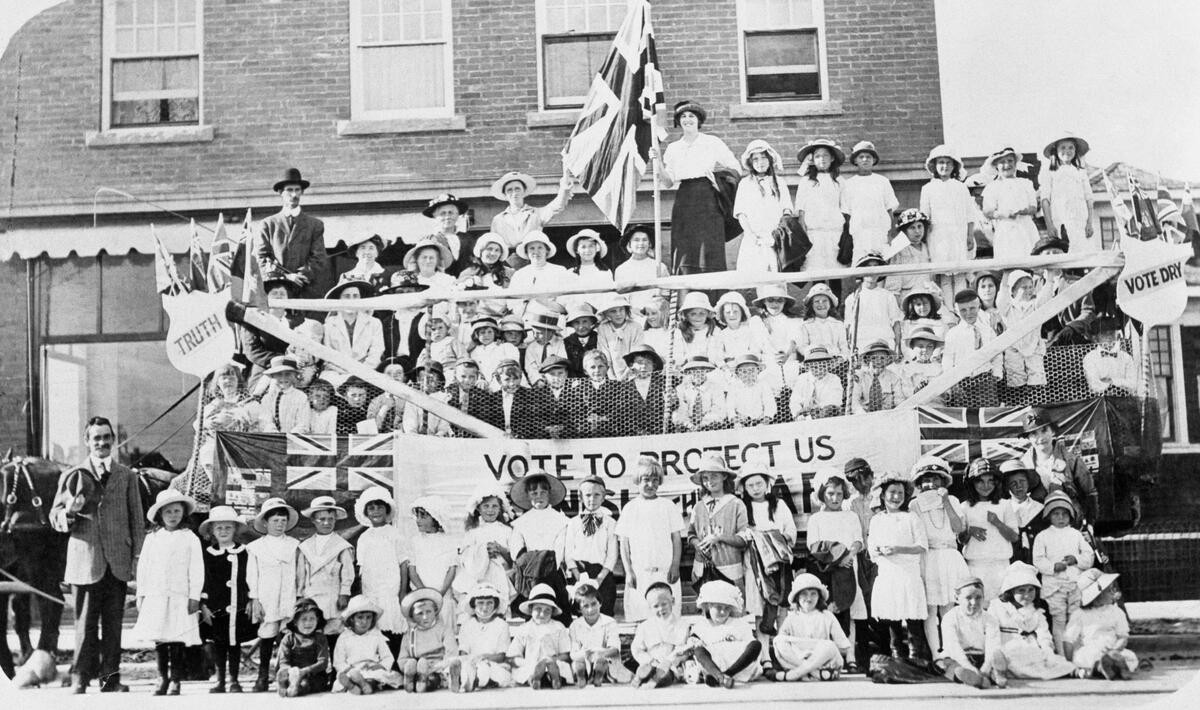
Hillhurst Presbyterian Sunday school group promoting prohibition temperance, Calgary, Alberta

Canadians drank heavily during the 19th century. The 1851 census of Upper Canada recorded 1,999 taverns or one to 478 people. Drunkenness, fighting, domestic abuse, and household impoverishment were rampant.

Prohibition was mostly spurred on by the organized crusades against social evil launched by the temperance movement. They targeted drinking establishments, which they viewed as the source of societal ills and misery. Initially, the temperance movement in Canada, which began in the 1820s, was largely concerned with the consumption of strong liquor, while beer, wine, and cider were not considered to be a significant problem. However, by the 1840s, "total abstinence" temperance societies were the norm, and all alcoholic beverages, including those with lighter alcohol content, were considered dangerous. Inspired by the Maine Law of 1851, which saw legal prohibition in the U.S. state of Maine, the temperance movement in Canada shifted to the strategy of legal coercion to advance the cause of sobriety.

The main temperance organizations that emerged at the beginning of the prohibition era in Canada were the Dominion Alliance for the Total Suppression of the Liquor Traffic and the Woman's Christian Temperance Union (WCTU) of Canada. Protestant denominations, including Baptists, Methodists, Presbyterians, and Congregationalists, generally supported prohibition and campaigned for it beginning in the late 19th century. Notable advocates included Archibald McKillop, a Scottish-Canadian blind poet and orator from the Eastern Townships who promoted sobriety through public speeches and verse. Prohibition was an important aspect of the Protestant Social Gospel.

The WCTU established itself throughout much of Canada and the United States as one of the largest and most influential contributors to the temperance movement. One way the WCTU attempted to spread the message of temperance was by pressuring provincial governments for temperance instruction in schools. In 1892, under pressure from the WCTU and other temperance organizations, Nova Scotia enacted legislation requiring schools to teach students about the effects of alcohol on the human body. By the end of the 19th century, through the efforts of the WCTU, most provinces had at least some temperance instruction in school. The WCTU also looked outside of the formal school systems to promote temperance ideals to children, and also spread their message to Sunday schools, and youth groups.

The Dominion Alliance was an umbrella organization that "included representatives from most temperance and prohibition societies," including the WCTU. The group lobbied governments at various levels to enact prohibitory laws, and other legislation that advanced the cause of temperance. They submitted a memorial, or a written statement of principles, to the nineteenth session of the Huron Diocese's Anglican Synod in 1876. In it they stated:

The Council of the Alliance has agreed to the following principles as a basis to which they most respectfully but earnestly call your attention:

DECLARATION OF PRINCIPLES.

1. "That it is neither right nor politic for the Government to afford legal protection and sanction to any traffic or system that tends to increase crime, to waste the resources of the Dominion, to corrupt the social habits, and to destroy the healths and lives of the people.
2. "That the traffic in intoxicating liquors as common beverages is inimical to the true interests of individuals, and destructive of the order and welfare of society, and ought therefore to be prohibited.
3. "That the history and results of all legislation in regard to the liquor traffic abundantly prove, that it is impossible satisfactorily to limit or regulate a system so essentially mischievous in its tendencies.
4. "That no consideration of private gain or public revenue can justify the upholding of a traffic so thoroughly wrong in principle, so suicidal in policy, and disastrous in its results, as the traffic in intoxicating liquors.
5. "That the Legislative Prohibition of the liquor traffic is perfectly compatible with national liberty, and with the claims of justice and legitimate commerce.
6. "That the Legislative Prohibition of the liquor traffic would be highly conducive to the development of progressive civilization.
7. "That rising above sectarian and party considerations, all good citizens should combine to procure an enactment prohibiting the manufacture and sale of intoxicating beverages, as affording the most efficient aid in removing the appalling evils of intemperance."

There may be differences of opinion in regard to the foregoing particulars, but the Council assures the Christian Body it has now the honor [sic] to approach, that the utmost diligence has been exercised in the examination of evidence on all the subjects embraced therein.

Deeply convinced of the value of the aid of Christian Ministers and Churches, as such, we solicit your co-operation in the efforts now being made to concentrate the moral and religious energies of the Dominion against the liquor traffic.

Your memorialists most earnestly hope that your counsels may be wisely directed, and that you will take such action in the premises as may strengthen the hands and encourage the hearts of those who have the direction of the Prohibitory Liquor Law movement.

=== Early local prohibition laws ===
Some legislative steps toward prohibition were taken in the 19th century. The passage of the Canada Temperance Act of 1864, also called the Dunkin Act, after Christopher Dunkin, in the Province of Canada, allowed any county or city to forbid the sale of liquor by majority vote in a referendum.

After Canadian Confederation, the power of local option votes was extended to the rest of Canada via the Canada Temperance Act of 1878. It was known as the Scott Act after its sponsor, Sir Richard William Scott. It allowed any county or city to opt into prohibition if it was supported by a majority in a local vote. Under the CTA, the sale of alcohol for sacramental or medicinal usage remained legal.

Local option votes resulted in more than 240 places in Ontario being under local option prohibition by 1912.

=== 1898 federal referendum ===
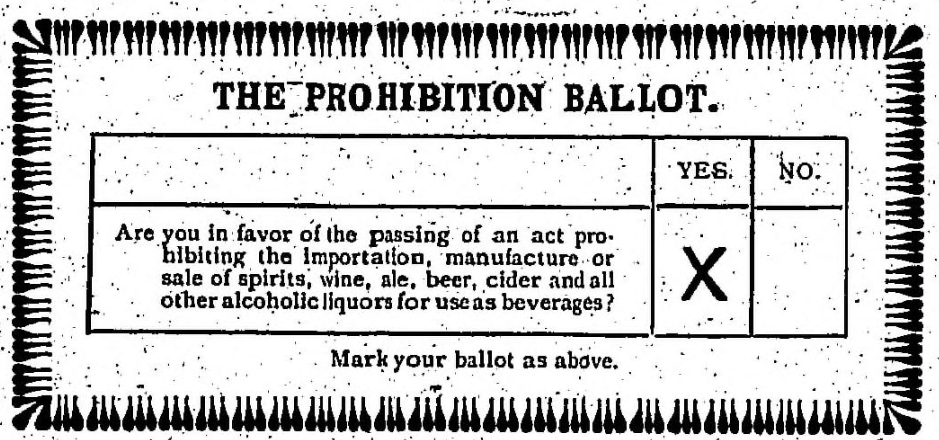
Sample ballot for the 1898 Canadian prohibition referendum, filled with suggested answers, as it appeared in The Acton Free Press (22 September 1898)

An official, but non-binding, 1898 prohibition plebiscite was held with 51 per cent voting in favour of prohibition, and 49 per cent against. Voter turnout was low, at 44 per cent. Prohibition had a majority in all provinces except Quebec, where a strong 80 per cent voted against it. The main factor was religion. Pietistic Protestants, such as Methodists, Presbyterians and Scandinavian Lutherans, were strongly in support. Liturgical or high-church Protestants, such as Anglicans and German Lutherans were in opposition; the Catholic population, both French and Irish, were strongly opposed. Urban areas were more opposed than rural. Economic wealth and class apparently made little difference.

Despite a prohibition majority, Prime Minister Wilfrid Laurier's government chose not to introduce a federal bill on prohibition, because of strong opposition in Quebec and low voter turnout. As a result, prohibition in Canada was enacted in a patchwork manner through laws passed at the provincial level during the first twenty years of the 20th century.

== Legislation ==
=== First Nations ===
First Nations were subject to prohibitory alcohol laws under the Indian Act of 1876. This was an attempt on the part of the Canadian government to facilitate assimilation, because for an indigenous person to possess alcohol they had to become a Canadian citizen through enfranchisement and to be eligible for enfranchisement indigenous people had to demonstrate sobriety. The laws also reflected a widespread false belief among North Americans, that indigenous peoples were more prone to alcohol dependency, known as the "firewater myth". Sections of the Indian Act regarding liquor were not repealed for over a hundred years, until 1985.

=== PEI first to adopt prohibition ===
Prince Edward Island implemented prohibition as early as 1901. Prince Edward Island finally repealed prohibition in 1948.

=== Provincial and federal prohibition during and after the First World War ===
During the First World War more provinces joined PEI in having prohibition. Most of the provinces enacted prohibition during the First World War, and opted to extend the ban on alcohol following the end of the war. Provinces held referendums on the issue. Quebec was unusual in that it adopted prohibition in 1919 and quickly repealed it due to intense public pressure.

The First World War was an important factor in the success of prohibition efforts in Canada at the beginning of the 20th century. Many believed that prohibition would create a Canadian society worthy of the sacrifices of soldiers overseas. The argument was also raised that prohibition would benefit the war effort since it would prevent waste and inefficiency. Some also considered the barroom a place where "foreigners" congregated and "plotted" against the British Empire, and therefore the war effort. As former opponents of prohibition became silenced, lest they be judged as unpatriotic, provinces began to implement prohibition.

Following the 1917 Canadian election, in March 1918 the federal government as a war measure made it illegal to manufacture "intoxicating" drinks. The federal government introduced national prohibition by an Order in Council that became effective on 1 April 1918. It prohibited the importation of alcohol of more than 2.5 per cent into Canada, the inter-provincial trade of alcohol, and included a ban on production. The wartime ban expired a year after the conclusion of the war. This was the first and last time that national prohibition on the production, distribution, and consumption of alcohol was enacted in Canada.

The elimination of alcoholic beverages made a difference in Canadian society. The Ontario Alliance for the Total Suppression of the Liquor Trade stated in 1922 that the number of convictions for offences associated with drink had declined from 17,413 in 1914 to 5,413 in 1921, and drunkenness cases had dropped from 16,590 in 1915 to 6,766 in 1921. By the end of prohibition, nearly three quarters of beer breweries had closed. It was only in the second half of the 20th century that a significant number of new breweries opened again.

=== Alcohol production and prohibition in Ontario ===
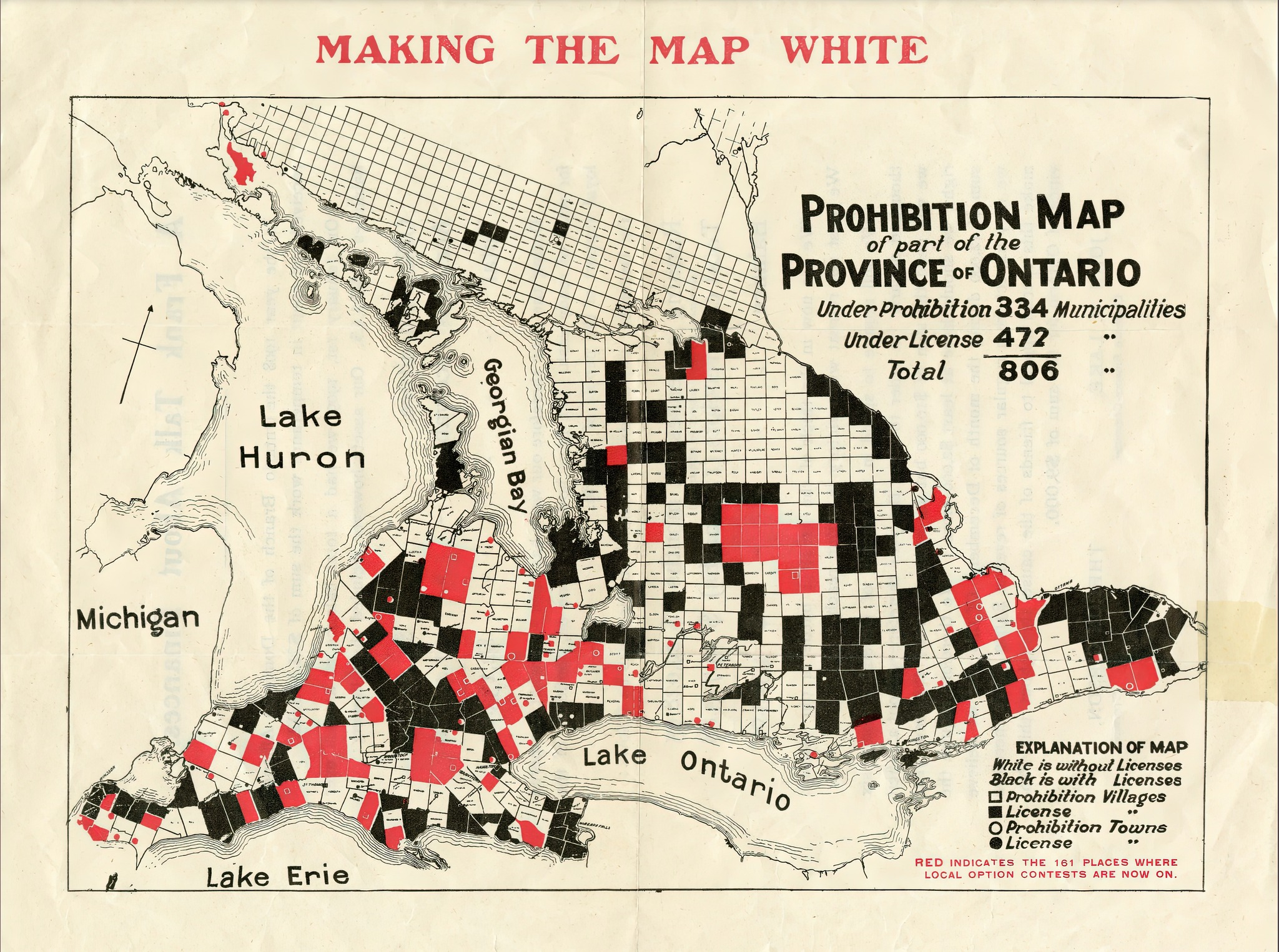
Map of alcohol prohibition in Ontario in 1909

Despite having prohibition from 1916 until 1927 in Ontario, the government allowed for numerous exceptions. Wineries were exempted from closure, and various breweries and distilleries remained open for the export market. In Hamilton, Ontario, Rocco Perri specialized in exporting liquor from old Canadian distilleries, such as Seagram and Gooderham and Worts, to the United States, and helped these companies obtain a large share of the American market. In London, Ontario, Harry Low and his group of rum-runners bought the Carling Brewery, while the Labatt family left the operations to the manager Edmund Burke. The fact that the "export" might be by small boat from Windsor across the river to Detroit only helped the province's economy. Rum-running occurred in other provinces as well.

Throughout the prohibition period, Ontario-made wines remained legal in Ontario and some have argued that Ontario never had prohibition. The government allowed the sale of light beer, considered to be non-intoxicating (and generally reviled by drinkers) in 1923, but it did not repeal the legislation creating prohibition until 1927, replacing it with the Liquor Control Act and creating the Liquor Control Board of Ontario to enforce the act. Although some might argue the light beer amendment of 1923 ended prohibition, there is a general consensus among recent historians that 1927 is the date of repeal.

After the 1924 Ontario prohibition referendum narrowly upheld prohibition under the Ontario Temperance Act (OTA), the Ontario government led by Howard Ferguson permitted the sale of low-alcohol beer. Ferguson's successful re-election platform in 1926 included a repeal of the OTA. Prohibition was ended in 1927 following the election, and the Liquor Control Act (LCA) was passed supplanting the OTA. The Liquor Control Board of Ontario (LCBO) was created to enforce the LCA by "controlling the sale of liquor to the public and the regulation of the places in which people could drink their booze." The Liquor Control Act of 1927 allowed for the sale of alcoholic beverages for individual purchase, but public drinking of full strength alcohol (in pubs, taverns, restaurants, beverage rooms) remained illegal. Subsequently, the Liquor Control Act of 1934 permitted public drinking, but only in hotel beverage rooms where beer was permitted, and dining rooms where beer and wine was permitted with meals.

== Repeal ==
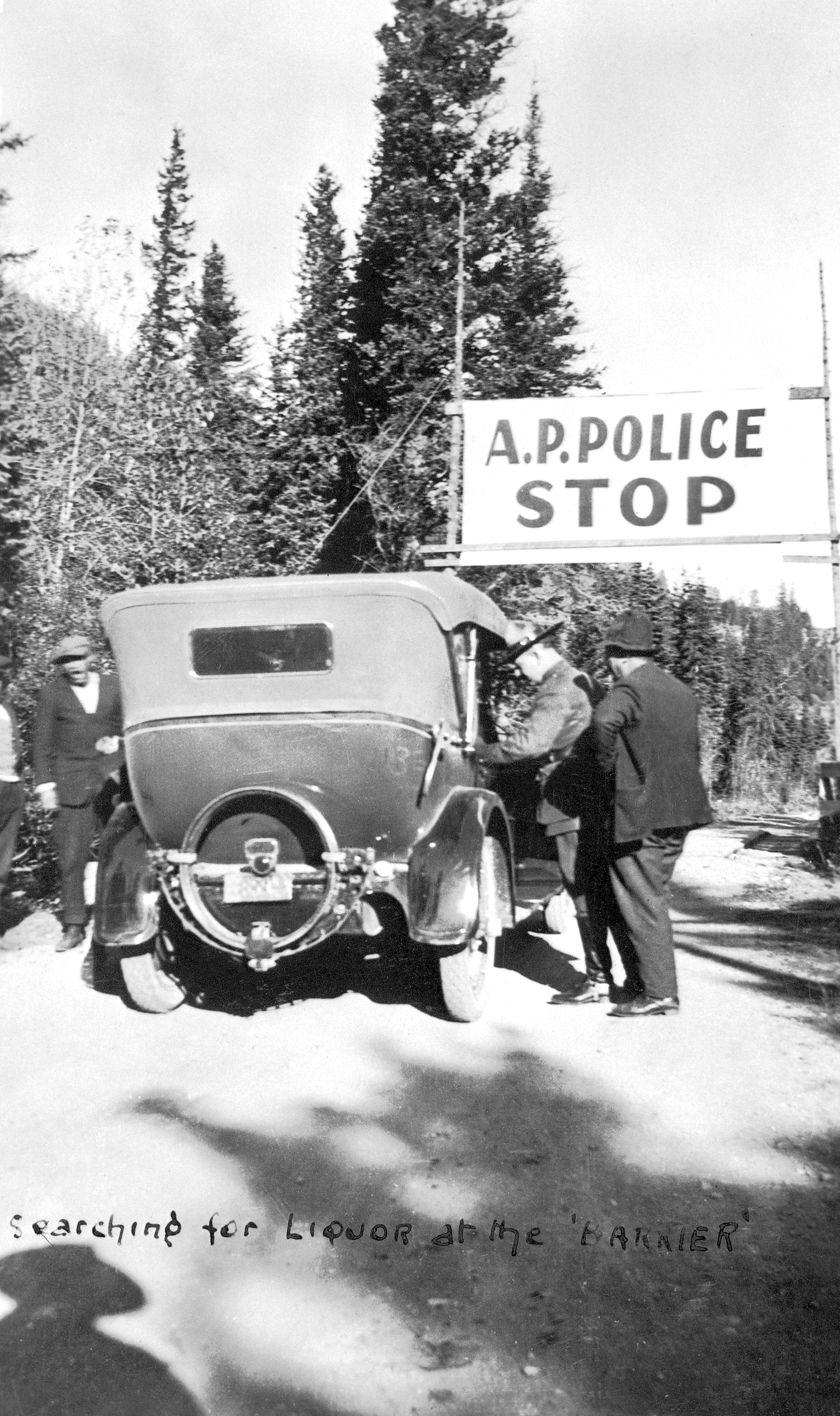
Police search for liquor at an Alberta Provincial Police stop near Coleman, Alberta, during prohibition

The dates of the repeal of prohibition in the various provinces are debatable. Since each province had its own laws, any attempt to generalize liquor control legislation distorts the situation.

This table should not be taken as definitive, but rather as one interpretation of prohibition's end points.

| Province/territory | Provincial prohibition enacted | Repealed |
|---|---|---|
| Northwest Territories | 1874 | 1891 |
| New Brunswick | 1856 | 1856 |
| New Brunswick | 1917 | 1927 |
| District of Keewatin | 1876 | 1905 |
| Prince Edward Island | 1901 | 1948 |
| Saskatchewan | 1915 | 1924 |
| Alberta | 1916 | 1923 |
| Manitoba | 1916 | 1921 |
| Ontario | 1916 | 1927 |
| British Columbia | 1917 | 1921 |
| Newfoundland (not part of Canada until 1949) | 1917 | 1924 |
| Yukon | 1918 | 1920 |
| Quebec | None (Note: Prohibition was proposed in a law adopted in 1918, and was supposed to come into effect on May 1st, 1919, but was never fully implemented owing to a referendum legalizing the sale of light beers and wines before the ban came into effect. Only the sale of spirits would be criminalized, between 1919 and 1921.) | |
| Nova Scotia | 1916 (full province) | 1930 |

After the First World War, opponents of prohibition claimed that too many people were ignoring the law and drinking illegally, and that prohibition contributed to the expansion of organized crime and violence. The new slogans were 'Moderation' and 'Government Regulation.' Moreover, the denominations of Presbyterianism, Methodism, and Congregationalism voted to merge as the United Church of Canada, to create a stronger liberal voice. The possibility of new revenue led several provinces to introduce government control on the sale of alcohol and by the mid-1920s prohibition was fighting a losing battle.

Quebec adopted a prohibition law in 1918, that was supposed to come into effect in May 1919, but, following a referendum in April 1919, allowed nonetheless the sale of light beer, cider, and wine in hotels, taverns, cafés, clubs, and corner stores. Quebec had a more liberal system than most places in North America at the time. As such, prohibition never fully came into effect in Quebec. Two years later, faced with extensive smuggling of hard liquors, the province legalized the sale of spirits in government run stores. A convenient train ride from the eastern seaboard of the United States, Quebec became a mecca for thirsty Americans, even inspiring the song "Hello Montreal."

Nova Scotia had adopted a form of prohibition in the Nova Scotia Temperance act of 1910, which applied to the entire province except Halifax. Halifax was added in 1916 making the full province dry, at least legally. Its seaport culture lessened support for the ban and also made its enforcement difficult. It was dropped in 1930 after a 31 October 1929 referendum.

From 1921 to 1925, five provinces repealed prohibition, usually after conducting a referendum on dropping prohibition. New Brunswick and Ontario dropped it in 1927. Nova Scotia dropped it in 1930.

British Columbia's new law initially allowed only sale of liquor in special liquor stores. Public drinking remained illegal until 1925, when "beer by the glass" legislation permitted beer parlours to open in hotels.

A prohibition plebiscite was conducted in Alberta on 3 November 1923, and a majority voted in favour of replacing prohibition. In 1924 Alberta replaced prohibition with government-store sales of beer, wine and hard liquor, and licensed beer "parlours" selling beer under strict conditions.

Saskatchewan held a referendum on 16 July 1923 and repealed prohibition in 1924, replacing it with government sale of liquor.

Prince Edward Island was the last province to repeal prohibition in 1948.

Despite the lifting of provincial prohibition laws, it still remained illegal for most types of liquor to be shipped across provincial borders, under the Importation of Intoxicating Liquors Act, into the 21st century. In response, Okanagan MP Dan Albas tabled Bill C-311, which would repeal this restriction and allow the interprovincial distribution of wine (but not beer or spirits). With the promise of potential for increased investment in Canada's wine industry if the restrictions were lifted (owing to wineries finally being able to distribute their product in other provinces), the House of Commons passed the bill in amended form by a vote of 287–0 in June 2012. However, the exemption created by the amendment is subject to the laws of the province into which the wine is being shipped. So far, the provinces have opened their borders inconsistently to outside alcohol. For example, Ontario and British Columbia permit the interprovincial transport of wine on the person (up to one case), but have made no law or policy that allows interprovincial shipment of wine.

== Dry communities in Canada ==
=== Alberta ===
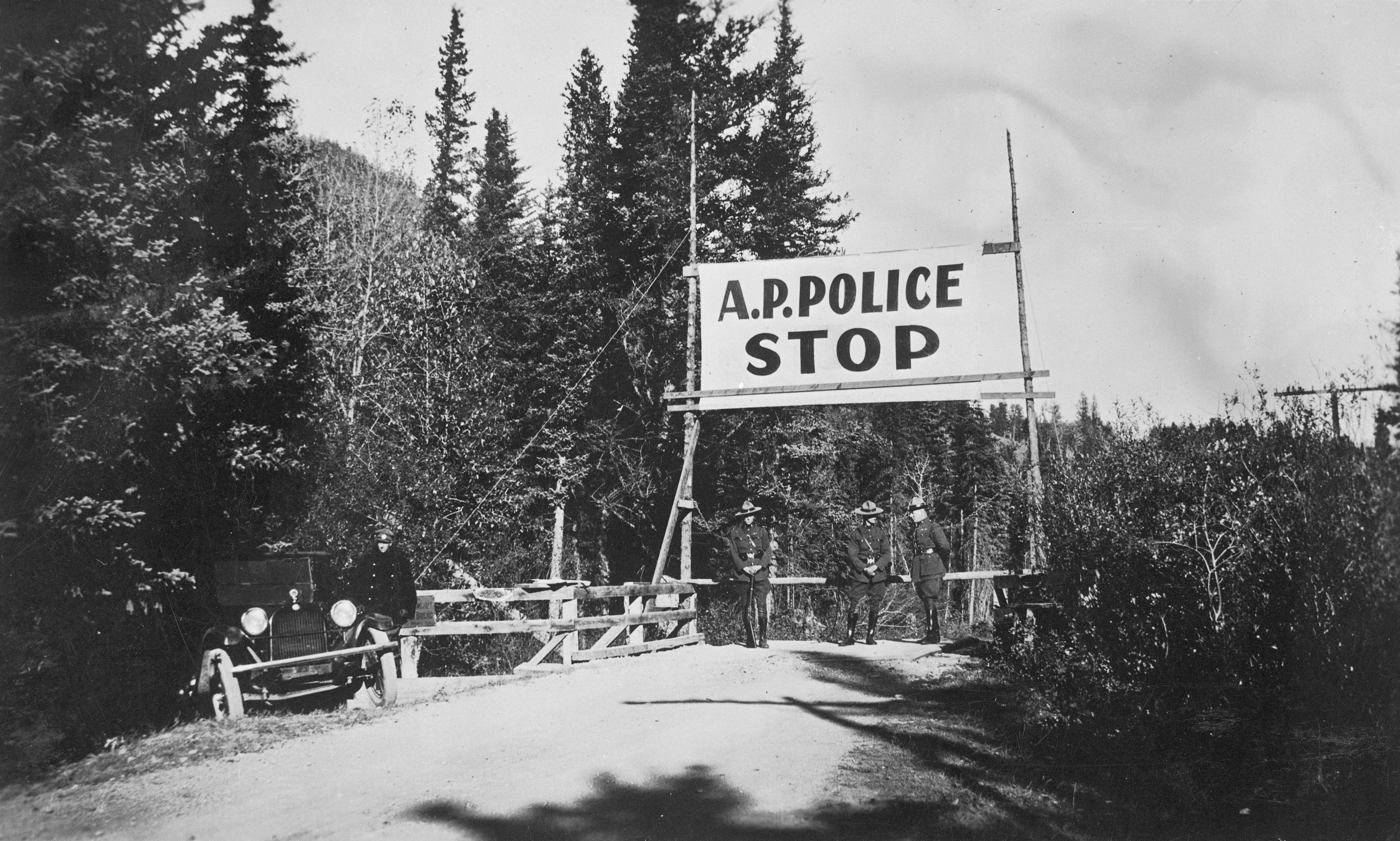
Alberta Provincial Police stop near Coleman, Alberta, during prohibition.

The Cardston, Alberta, licence district, which included the town and surrounding countryside, held a local option vote in 1902, and a majority voted in favour of prohibition. Cardston voted to uphold prohibition by plebiscite as recently as 2014.

Prohibition was abolished in the last few prohibition areas in Alberta on 17 June 2020, but under new provincial legislation, those areas remained dry until their respective councils passed motions to allow liquor vendors.

In Alberta, between 1921 and 1957, 126 local option votes were conducted on the question of allowing local beer parlours (taverns).

Cardston County, the western portion of the County of Warner No. 5 and the communities contained within their boundaries did not allow standing licences for sale of liquor within their limits, previous to 2020. This area includes the communities of Cardston, Raymond, Magrath and Stirling.

In June 2020, the Alberta government repealed its prohibition law in effect in these areas. Cardston passed a town bylaw to maintain prohibition.

In 2022, Raymond considered allowing alcohol sales. "In June of 2020, the province removed the last vestiges of the Prohibition Act and when that happened, Raymond went from prohibited community to a community without licence,” said Kurtis Pratt, Raymond’s chief administrative officer. In a 2022 town survey a majority of 52 per cent of the 885 respondents opted for Raymond to remain a dry community, and the town council voted down a motion for a bylaw amendment to allow for restaurants in Raymond to have a liquor licence.

A referendum in town of Cardston in June 2023 saw a majority vote to cancel prohibition. Town council voted to scrap the prohibition bylaw in September 2023, but still the issuance of the first licence for sale of liquor was up to town council. In August 2024, alcohol sales began at restaurants and recreation centres.

=== Manitoba ===
- Steinbach did not allow the sale of liquor within city limits until 2011.

=== Newfoundland and Labrador ===
- Natuashish, a federal Indian reserve, voted to ban alcohol in 2008, and a vote to repeal the ban in 2010 was not successful.

=== Northwest Territories ===
- As of 2025, there are six dry communities: Gamèti (within 20 km (12 mi) of Gamètì School), Łutselk'e (within 25 km (16 mi) of the community hall, Nahanni Butte (within 15 km (9.3 mi) of the Old School), Wekweètì (within 30 km (19 mi) of the community office), Whatì (within 25 km (16 mi) of Mezi Community School), and K'atl'odeeche First Nation (within the K'atl'odeeche First Nation territory).
- As of 2025, there are ten communities where the amount of alcohol is limited. These are Délı̨nę, Dettah, Fort Good Hope, Fort Liard, Fort McPherson, Paulatuk, Sambaa K'e, Tuktoyaktuk, Tulita, and Ulukhaktok.
- As of 2025, there are seven liquor stores in the territory. They are located in Fort Simpson, Fort Smith, Hay River, Inuvik, Norman Wells, and two in Yellowknife.

=== Nunavut ===
As of 2025, there are six dry communities: Arviat, Coral Harbour, Gjoa Haven, Kugaaruk, Pangnirtung, and Sanikiluaq.

There are also 12 communities that operate the committee system. In these communities anybody wishing to purchase alcohol must obtain permission, including the quantity, from a locally elected Alcohol Education Committee (AEC), before they are allowed to order from Iqaluit (Baffin communities), Rankin Inlet (Kivalliq communities), or Yellowknife (Kitikmeot communities). These communities are Arctic Bay, Chesterfield Inlet, Clyde River, Igloolik, Kimmirut, Kinngait, Naujaat, Pond Inlet, Qikiqtarjuaq, Resolute Bay, Sanirajak, and Whale Cove. Six communities are unrestricted: Baker Lake, Cambridge Bay, Grise Fiord, Iqaluit, Rankin Inlet, and Taloyoak.

In May 2022, the hamlet of Kugluktuk voted to return to limit on alcohol sales. A total of 287 votes were cast. This was equivalent to 38 per cent of eligible voters in the community whose total population is approximately 1,400. Sixty per cent of those voters opted for restrictions, which exceeds the 60-per-cent threshold that was required for change.

=== Ontario ===
- Orillia ended prohibition in 1955.
- The city of Owen Sound continued to outlaw liquor until 1972.
- Parts of west Toronto (see The Junction) did not permit liquor sales until 2000 due largely to the efforts of William Horace Temple that resulted in the ban from 1904 to 1998.
- James Bay Cree communities in Ontario remain dry as of 2016 (Moose Factory, Fort Albany, Kashechewan, Attawapiskat), Deer Lake First Nation; in that there is no government store selling alcoholic products. Restriction of the transport of alcohol into the communities is not generally enforced, and consumption is still common. Liquor sales are available in Moosonee, which is accessible from all communities by ice road in the winter.

=== Quebec ===
- Cree communities in James Bay Quebec, with the exception of Whapmagoostui, were still dry as of 2013 (Waskaganish, Eastmain, Wemindji, Chisasibi, Waswanipi, Mistissini, Oujé-Bougoumou and Nemaska). Chisasibi is unique in that it has a checkpoint for enforcing the ban on bringing alcohol into the village, although this is skirted by snowmobiles avoiding the main road.

=== Saskatchewan ===
- The community of Govenlock thrived after Montana's prohibition declaration in 1919, large groups of drinkers from that state frequently crossed the border by train to visit Govenlock to purchase booze. Govenlock has been a ghost town since 1976.

=== Yukon ===
- Old Crow is a dry Gwichʼin community on the Porcupine River.
- Ross River is a dry community.

== See also ==
- Whiskey Gap, Alberta
- Drug liberalization
- Prohibition in the United States
