= List of Canadian tornadoes and tornado outbreaks (2000–present) =

Canada's only confirmed F5 tornado occurred in Elie, Manitoba on June 22, 2007

This is a list of tornadoes and tornado outbreaks that have occurred in Canada since the year 2000. Due to increasing detection, particularly in the US and southern Canada, numbers of counted tornadoes have increased markedly in recent decades although number of actual tornadoes and counted significant tornadoes has not. In older events, the number of tornadoes officially counted is likely underestimated.

On average, there are around 80 confirmed and unconfirmed tornadoes that touch down in Canada each year, with most occurring in the southern Canadian Prairies, Southern Ontario and southern Quebec. Canada ranks second in the world for the most tornadoes per year, after the United States. The most common types are F0 to F2 in damage intensity level and usually result in minor structural damage to barns, wood fences, roof shingles, chimneys, uprooted or snapped tree limbs and downed power lines. Fewer than 5% of tornadoes in Canada are rated F3 or higher in intensity, where wind speeds are in excess of 225 km/h (140 mph). Prior to April 1, 2013, Canada used a slightly modified Fujita scale, and as of that date the Enhanced Fujita scale, again slightly modified, was put into use to rate tornado intensity, based on the damage to buildings and vegetation.

Each year on average, about 43 tornadoes occur across the Canadian Prairies and about 17 occur across Ontario and Quebec. New Brunswick and the British Columbia Interior are also recognized tornado zones. All other provinces and territories have significantly less threat from tornadoes. The peak season in Canada is through the summer months (June to August) when clashing air masses move north, as opposed to the spring season in the United States southern-central plains, although tornadoes in Canada have occurred in spring, fall and very rarely winter. In certain years like 2012, when there had been drought in the American Midwest and The Great Plains but the Canadian Prairies had higher humidity, Saskatchewan recorded more tornadoes that July than the entire USA.

The reported increase in numbers of tornadoes in recent years may reflect more reporting by citizens and media involvement rather than an actual increase in tornado occurrence (although some natural increase has not been ruled out), in addition to better detection technology i.e. Doppler weather radar and satellite imagery. The upswing could also be attributed to other factors, such as improved aerial and ground damage assessment after the fact in sparsely populated areas (particularly the case in remote parts of the Canadian Prairies and Northern Ontario, for example), better trained spotter capabilities and increased use of digital recording devices by citizens. The Northern Tornadoes Project attempts to gather more systematic data on tornado prevalence. Tornadoes in Canada are enough of a threat for a public warning system to be in place, overseen by the national weather agency, Environment Canada (EC).

For a variety of reasons, such as Canada's lower population density and generally stronger housing construction due to the colder climate, Canadian tornadoes have historically caused far fewer fatalities than tornadoes in the United States. The deadliest tornado in Canadian history, the Regina Cyclone of June 30, 1912, does not even rank in the top 25 when compared to American tornado fatalities. Urban centres are not immune from the threat of severe tornadoes. Twelve medium to large size Canadian cities have been hit by significant strength tornadoes (F3/EF3 or higher), which caused large-scale damage and fatalities: Toronto (1868); Regina (1912); Windsor (1946 and 1974); Sarnia (1953); LaSalle (1956); Sudbury (1970); Woodstock (1979); Lloydminster (1983); Barrie (1985); Edmonton (1987); Aylmer (1994 and 2018); and Ottawa-Gatineau (1888 and 2018).

All figures for damages are in Canadian dollars.

== 2000s ==
=== 2000 ===
- May 5 - an F0 tornado was confirmed near Hazzards Corners, Ontario, 8 km (5.0 mi) northeast of Madoc. It left a 10 km (6.2 mi) long path, causing minor damage to a house and knocking over approximately 100 trees.
- May 9 - two anticyclonic tornadoes touched down in Southern Ontario, causing minor damage. The first was given an F0 rating, and occurred north of Amherstburg. Multiple trees were knocked over along a 7 km (4.3 mi) path. The second tornado, an F1, touched down in Malden Centre. It tore the roof from a storage shed, and knocked over a large shipping container along a 1 km (0.62 mi) path. No injuries were reported with either storm.
- May 23 - an F2 tornado touched down near Appin, Ontario, damaging a pig barn and killing several pigs. Multiple homes also sustained damage, and hydro poles were snapped. No injuries were reported.
- May 24 - a confirmed F1 tornado hit Gloucester, Ontario, a suburb within the city of Ottawa. It snapped trees, tore the roof off a house and ripped the canopy from a gas station.
- June 22 - an F0 tornado was confirmed near the town of Quyon, Quebec.
- July 14 - an F3 tornado struck Green Acres Campground in Pine Lake, Alberta. Known as the Pine Lake tornado, it killed 12 people and caused over $13 million in damage. It was ranked as the fourth deadliest tornado in Canadian history.
- July 17 - three tornadoes were confirmed in Ontario after several supercell thunderstorms developed over the province. An F2 tornado formed over the city of Guelph, lasting approximately 23 minutes and leaving a path of damage 13 km (8.1 mi) long. Damage was estimated at over $2 million and one minor injury was reported. The same storm also produced a second, unrated tornado near Waterdown. The third tornado, an F1, occurred in Simcoe County, near the town of Melduf. It snapped and uprooted trees, and caused minor crop damage. An aluminum shed was destroyed.
- July 18 - an F0 tornado touched down near Saint-Jean-Chrysostome, Quebec.
- July 23 - an F3 tornado touched down and destroyed one home and tossed farm equipment near Marwayne, Alberta, 35 km (22 mi) northwest of Lloydminster.
- July 24 - a tornado outbreak in southern Manitoba spawned at least 4 confirmed tornadoes, including a large tornado which touched down for 10 minutes, from 6:10 pm to 6:20 pm, 5 km (3.1 mi) west of Brunkild, Manitoba. The Brunkild tornado did not hit anything, resulting in an F0 rating. The other confirmed tornadoes were located north of Elm Creek, Manitoba (4:22 pm), 3 km (1.9 mi) north of Brookdale, Manitoba(5:19 pm), west of Neepawa, Manitoba(5:50 pm) and south of Plum Coulee, Manitoba (6:08 pm).
- July 26 - a tornado touched down briefly near Wabamun, Alberta, about 70 km (43 mi) west of Edmonton, causing minor damage.
- August 1 - a tornado struck Viking, Alberta.
- August 6 - a tornado touched down near Elnora, Alberta, southeast of Pine Lake. The tornado occurred while people were gathering for a memorial service in Pine Lake for those who died in the Pine Lake tornado just a few weeks earlier.
- August 9 - a tornado was confirmed near Sangudo, Alberta.
- August 9 - an F1 tornado touched down near Tilbury, Ontario, destroying a barn and causing heavy damage to two farmhouses. No injuries were reported.

=== 2001 ===
- June 8 – an F0 tornado was confirmed near Upper Manitou Lake, about 45 km (28 mi) south of Dryden, Ontario, causing extensive tree damage.
- June 19 – two tornadoes touched down in the Saguenay–Lac-Saint-Jean region of Quebec. An F2 struck near Alma, lasting about half a minute and destroying two houses, a barn and a garage. The second tornado, an F0, was confirmed in the same region near Pointe-Taillon National Park.
- July 1 – an F1 tornado was confirmed near Lac Saint-Jean, Quebec. It tore the roof from a house and knocked out power to several communities.
- July 4 – four tornadoes touched down in Southern Ontario causing minor damage. Three were given an F0 rating, and were confirmed near the towns of Argyle, Campbellville and Ayr. The fourth was rated as an F1 and touched down in the Fenelon Falls area knocking over a silo. Two other tornadoes were reported, but not confirmed, near the towns of Arthur and Bancroft. No injuries were reported.
- July 4 – two F1 tornadoes were confirmed near the communities of Lac-des-Plages and Brébeuf, Quebec. No significant damage was reported.
- July 10 – an F0 tornado was confirmed near Saguenay, Quebec.
- July 13 – a tornado was spotted near Caroline, Alberta north of Calgary.
- August 4 – an F1 tornado touched down in Matagami, Quebec.
- August 9 – an F1 tornado was confirmed near Alma, Quebec.

=== 2002 ===
- May 31 – North Bay, Ontario, was struck by two weak tornadoes.
- June 23 – a weak tornado touched down in Ottawa between Kanata and Barrhaven.
- July 28 – severe thunderstorms over Northern Ontario produced a tornado over Halfway Lake Provincial Park (70 km (43 mi) north of Sudbury) where 800 people were camping at the time, fallen trees injure 4 campers. Up to 150 mm (5.9 in) rain falls in just 3 hours at Stratford and Tavistock.

=== 2003 ===
- June 11 – Laval, Quebec, was struck by an F1 tornado that damaged trees, and many warehouses in the industrial park just north of Autoroute 440. It also caused some vehicles to go off the road as it crossed west to east both lanes of Autoroute 15 during rush hour.
- July 2 – a tornado touched down on an area of Narrow Hills Provincial Park northwest of Nipawin, Saskatchewan. It destroyed several residential trailers, turned over a tractor-trailer unit, and caused a number of injuries; the storm also dropped baseball-sized hail that is typical of tornado-producing thunderstorms in the Prairies.
- July 4 – an F1 tornado struck the communities of Saint-Jacques, New Brunswick, Moulin-Morneault, Saint-Joseph-de-Madawaska, and Deuxieme-Sault. Uprooted trees, damaged homes and businesses. Site inspected by a Meteorological Service of Canada (MSC) forecaster.
- July 8 – an F0 touched down near Sainte-Jeanne-d'Arc, Quebec, in the Saguenay–Lac-Saint-Jean region. Several buildings and trees were damaged.
- July 11 – a tornado touched down near Westlock County, Alberta, north of Edmonton.
- July 14 - a tornado struck Gretna, Manitoba, leveling crops, blowing down sheds and garages and knocking down hydro poles. Trees up to a metre in diameter were struck down by the tornado.
- August 13 – a tornado touched down on a golf course and lake resort west of Edmonton in Wabamun, Alberta causing some injuries.

=== 2004 ===
- April 18 – an early season tornado touched down near Raymond, Alberta, about 30 km (19 mi) southeast of Lethbridge.
- May 22 – May 2004 tornado outbreak sequence, one strong F2 struck near Mitchell, Ontario, at 6 pm EDT (UTC−04:00) and an F3 in nearby Gad's Hill, causing extensive property and infrastructure damage.
- June 9 – an F1 struck near Escott, Ontario, destroying a barn and a two-car garage. One man was killed when a tree fell on the porch he was standing on.
- June 13 – a large tornado touched down near Vulcan, Alberta. The storm was also accompanied by hail greater than 2 cm (0.79 in) in diameter.
- July 8 – an F2 tornado touched down in Grande Prairie, Alberta, causing damage to homes and businesses, and flipping over vehicles.
- July 11 – a tornado briefly touched down in Andrew, Alberta, northeast of Edmonton.
- July 31 – four confirmed tornadoes touched down in southern Quebec. An F1 in Châteauguay on Montreal's south shore, another F1 in Durham-Sud, an F1 in Saint-Albert, which cut a path 6 km (3.7 mi) long, and an F0 in Chesterville.
- August 10 – two F1 tornadoes occurred near the Ottawa, Ontario, region. The first near Burnstown, 10 km (6.2 mi) southeast of Renfrew. It ripped the roof off a barn, snapped several trees and destroyed a shed. The second tornado happened near Thurso.

=== 2005 ===
- May 23 – a tornado touched down in and around Nipawin, Saskatchewan.
- June 4 – several cold-core funnel clouds were spotted in Central and Southern Alberta. Four of which briefly touched the ground. Several trees were damaged.
- June 21 – A severe thunderstorm spawned one tornado near Lethbridge, Alberta. Several funnel clouds and golf ball size hail was reported from Lethbridge to Taber.
- July 2 – a tornado touched down about 25 km (16 mi) west of Estevan, Saskatchewan.
- September 30 - a F2 tornado touched down in Havre-aux-Maisons, Quebec.
- August 19 – Southern Ontario tornado outbreak of 2005. These associated storms caused extensive widespread damage in a path from Stratford (20 km (12 mi) west of Kitchener), to Peterborough, and along Georgian Bay near Collingwood. A storm cell just to the north of Fergus spawned two F2 strength tornadoes that were particularly damaging, tearing apart trees, farms and overturning automobiles driving on a highway. The first tornado tracked through Milverton to Conestogo Lake (west of Elmira). The second moved from Salem to Lake Bellwood (north of Guelph). The same storm cell later triggered a tornado warning in Toronto and caused extensive flooding with over 140 mm (5.5 in) of rain in some northern sections of the city, washing out many roads as well as damaging infrastructure such as storm sewers and electrical systems. An unusual tornado possibly touched down within the Toronto city limits, although never officially confirmed by Environment Canada. In its wake, the storm left a trail of damage that, according to the Insurance Bureau of Canada, represented the highest insured loss in the province's history, exceeding $500 million. That's more than two and a half times Ontario's losses during the infamous ice storm of 1998 and the second largest loss event in Canadian history.
- November 9 – A late-season F1 tornado touched down in Hamilton, Ontario, damaging homes and tearing the roof off an elementary school a school, injuring two students.

=== 2006 ===
- July 4 – an F1 tornado struck Glassville, New Brunswick, 40 km (25 mi) south of Perth Andover. It caused a great deal of forest and structural damage, but no injuries or deaths were reported.
- July 14 – a tornado touched down near Gretna, Manitoba, flattening crops, damaging equipment sheds, and tearing up trees and power lines.
- July 17 – an F1 tornado struck Newmarket, Ontario, at night, packing winds of 120 to 170 km/h (75 to 106 mph), cut a swath of damage 10 km (6.2 mi) long and 100 m (330 ft) wide in the Woodbine Avenue/Davis Drive area around 10:15 pm EDT (UTC−04:00). At about the same time, an F0, with winds up to 115 km/h (71 mph), was wreaking havoc in a small section of the Stonehaven subdivision, off Leslie Street south of Mulock Drive.
- July 17 – an F1, or possibly a weak F2, hit a La Baie du Diable campground in Ferme-Neuve, Quebec, moving RVs and breaking trees.
- July 25 – an F0 tornado destroyed a barn in Lac Saint-Jean, Quebec. The same storm produced hail that reached 5–6 cm (2.0–2.4 in) in diameter and caused $2 million damage in the agricultural community.
- August 1 – an F2 tornado struck the community of Lac-Drolet, Quebec, in the Estrie region, destroying a house.
- August 2 – a number of homes and cottages damaged or completely destroyed by a tornado in Combermere, Ontario, located in the upper Ottawa Valley. The same storm system spawned an outbreak of fourteen confirmed tornadoes mostly concentrated north of Peterborough in the Haliburton, Kawartha and Madawaska areas, which damaged cottages in the area, some severely. It was the most tornadoes confirmed in Ontario in a single 24-hour span day since 1985 and matched the annual provincial average. The strongest were two F2s, one that struck an isolated area near Bancroft and the other that made a direct hit on the town of Combermere.
- August 5 – in Gull Lake, Manitoba an F2 tornado killed a woman at a campground north of Winnipeg.
- August 15 - an F1 tornado impacted the area of Pokemouche and Evangeline, New Brunswick. Hail, damaging winds and intense lightning were reported in the region. A tornado swept along a corridor of 20–50 m (66–164 ft) wide and 3 to 5 km (1.9 to 3.1 mi) long extending from Pokemouche through Evangeline. The tornado estimated in the lower F1 range (wind estimated around 120 km/h (75 mph)) caused structural damage to a few properties and uprooted/snapped a few trees along the corridor. The sighting of the actual funnel cloud / tornado was reported by a few members of the public. Ended at 47.7°N 64.85°W
- August 20 – two tornadoes touched down in Manitoba, including an F2 tornado that hit the community of La Broquerie, Manitoba, destroying a house. The second tornado touched down just east of the Stony Mountain Institution, approximately 15 km (9.3 mi) north of Winnipeg, Manitoba, whipping up dust in a farm field. Video on YouTube
- August 24 – two tornadoes touched down near Unity and Yorkton, Saskatchewan.

=== 2007 ===
- May 15 – An F1 tornado struck the Mitchell, Ontario, area around 60 km (37 mi) northeast of London, causing minor damage. It was the third significant tornado to hit the Mitchell area in a three-year span. The same storm system that caused this tornado also produced two other tornadoes (an F0 and an F1) in The Thumb area of Michigan, northern Indiana, and Ohio before crossing Lake Huron into Ontario.
- June 25 – a small tornado touches down near Standard, Alberta, destroying a barn and electrocuting a horse.
- June 26 – Environment Canada confirmed a tornado struck the Petitcodiac, New Brunswick, in the Salisbury area. The storm knocked down trees and hurled pieces of playground equipment and wheelbarrows long distances. In one incident, the tornado picked up a trampoline from a front lawn and threw it 18 m (59 ft) into a pasture.
- July 8 – a confirmed tornado touched down 20 km (12 mi) south of Mayerthorpe, Alberta.
- July 8 – an F1 tornado was confirmed near Mildmay, Ontario. The tornado destroyed a large implementation shed and debris was reported 1.5 km (0.93 mi) away. Another tornado was sighted in the area but was unconfirmed.
- July 23 – after a day of 40 °C (104 °F) heat in the Edmonton area, a downward draft from the overhead jet stream formed a high-precipitation (HP) supercell, resulting in a tornado over Edmonton International Airport in Leduc County just before sundown. The tornado touched just south of the Highway 2/2A junction, scattering rock, dirt, hay and small debris on 16 km (9.9 mi) of 2A, involving the towns of Kavanagh and Millet. Despite its large appearance, no major damage or injuries were reported, although power was out for a few hours in the vicinity and lightning ignited a range fire west of the airport.
- July 29 – an F0 tornado touched down near Gander Bay, Newfoundland and Labrador. The tornado flipped a few snowmobile trailers over before dissipating. One of very few to strike the province.
- July 31 – a suspected tornado flattens fields and demolishes a farm yard near Cupar, Saskatchewan, north of Regina.
- August 3 – an F2 tornado touched down in White Rapids, New Brunswick. The destruction of several farm buildings coupled with the cyclone signature that was recognized on the Doppler weather radar led officials to confirm a tornado.
- September 11 – an F0 tornado stuck near Batchawana Bay, Ontario, damaging property at Silver Birch Cabins and throwing around tents and lawn furniture.

2007 Confirmed Tornadoes
BC	AB	SK	MB	ON	QC	NB	NL
0	3	3	8	3	2	2	1

=== 2008 ===
- May 25 – at least two tornadoes touch down in the province of Manitoba. One was reported near Altona. No damage was reported.
- May 26 - two F0 tornadoes were confirmed in Northern Ontario. The first touched down in Windy Lake Provincial Park near, Sudbury, and the second near Reynolds Lake, northeast of North Bay. No injuries were reported.
- May 31 – a tornado touches down in Niverville, Manitoba. There were no reports of injuries or damage.
- June 6 – an F0 tornado was confirmed in the community of Echo Bay, Ontario. A roof was torn off a warehouse and tractor dealership was damaged.
- June 6 – a weak tornado touches down near Heisler, southeast of Edmonton. Minor property damage was reported.
- June 8 – a possible tornado was detected by doppler radar near Highway 402 in the Strathroy, Ontario, area in the late afternoon as strong storms moved through Southeast Michigan and into Southwestern Ontario. Three tornadoes in Ontario. F1 tornado was detected in Ruthven, near Kingsville and Leamington. Other tornadoes touched down near Lucan and Brantford.
- June 9 – a weak tornado touched down near Morris, Manitoba. No injuries or deaths were reported.
- June 10 – a tornado touched down west of Edmonton near Wabamun, Alberta.
- June 22 – an F0 tornado touched down in the Bryanston, Ontario, area, just north of London. The tornado damaged a large pig barn, and uprooted several trees.
- June 22 – a weak tornado touches down near Viking, Alberta. It damaged some properties including uprooted trees, a damaged fence and tore apart a shed.
- June 27 – five tornadoes touch down in the province of Manitoba. They were reported near Gladstone, Neepawa, Arden, Westbourne and MacGregor areas.
- July 6 – a weak tornado touches down north of Airdrie, Alberta. There was no report of damage or injuries.
- July 7 – a tornado touches down just west of Turtle Mountain Provincial Park, Manitoba, damaging docks and sinking boats. No injuries or fatalities.
- July 10 – an F1 tornado briefly touches down in the Shipshaw area of Saguenay, Quebec.
- July 10 – at least three tornadoes touch down in southeastern Saskatchewan during severe storms. They were reported near Dafoe, Kandahar, Dollard and Stoughton. Damage was also reported in Carlyle where high winds triggered a gas leak at a greenhouse forcing evacuations and a Home Hardware stores roof was ripped off in a storm in Yorkton.
- July 14 – a possible tornado touches down west of Battleford, Saskatchewan.
- July 15 – an F1 tornado touches down east of the small town of Vulcan, Alberta ripping two granaries off their concrete base on a farm.
- July 16 – a weak and brief F0 touched down just north of Downtown Edmonton around 14:00 pm MDT (UTC−06:00), a maximum width of 500 m (1,600 ft) was recorded. No major damage or injuries were reported.
- July 19, a waterspout touches down on Turtle Lake, Saskatchewan, north of the Battlefords Another tornado was reported near Dundurn south of Saskatoon
- July 22 – a weak F0 tornado touched down near Welland, Ontario, sending sheet metal into the air from a construction site. No significant damage or injuries were reported.
- July 23 – two waterspouts form over the St-Lawrence River in the Montreal area, one in the Port of Montreal area, visible from a large area of the island.
- July 26 – an F1 (possibly an F2) tornado touched down near the town of Coboconk, Ontario, at around 2:45 pm EDT (UTC−04:00). Severe weather warnings were in effect at the time of the tornado.
- July 27 – at least four tornadoes touch down near Chamberlin, Girvin, Radisson and Langham, Saskatchewan.
- August 26 – a tornado touches down at a golf course north of Prince Albert, Saskatchewan, injuring six.
- September 1 – an unconfirmed tornado touched down near La Broquerie, Manitoba, causing minor damage to the town's area. The tornado was on the ground for about three minutes.

2008 Confirmed Tornadoes
BC	AB	SK	MB	ON	QC	NB
0	6	10	10	9	3	0

=== 2009 ===
- April 25 – five tornadoes were confirmed in Ontario after the passage of an intense cold front on the warmest day of spring. Four were rated as F0 in strength, and touched down in the towns of Round Lake Centre, the west end of Ottawa, Guelph and Windsor. Damage consisted of snapped trees, broken hydro poles and roofs being peeled from buildings. Eighteen planes sustained damage at the Rockcliffe Flying Club. The fifth tornado was rated an F1, and hit the community of Breslau, damaging a barn and silo and uprooting trees over a 1.4 km (0.87 mi) path. No injuries were reported.
- May 1 – an F0 tornado touched down near Normandin, Quebec, snapping several utility poles.
- May 31 – an F0 tornado was confirmed approximately 18 km (11 mi) southeast of Calgary, Alberta. No damage was reported.
- June 1 – southern Manitoba saw its first major storm of the spring, which included an F0 tornado confirmed near Winnipeg.
- June 14 – an F0 tornado was reported and confirmed near Cloan, Saskatchewan, 40 km (25 mi) southwest of North Battleford. No damage was reported.
- June 25 – two tornadoes were confirmed in Central Alberta, causing slight damage. The first, an F1, touched down about 30 km (19 mi) northeast of Hanna tearing a roof from a barn. A second F0 tornado touched down near Cairns, ripping siding and roof tiles from structures.
- June 25 – three tornadoes touched down in Southern Ontario in the afternoon. An F2 was confirmed near Avon, tearing a roof off a house as a woman washed her hair in the bathroom. She escaped unharmed. Two F1 tornadoes were also confirmed near Leamington and Harrow causing minor damage.
- June 30 – an F1 tornado touches down and destroys several farm buildings near Baljennie, Saskatchewan. Another F0 tornado was confirmed near Hafford.
- July 3 – an F0 tornado was confirmed near Verona, Ontario, 30 km (19 mi) north of Kingston causing minimal damage.
- July 4 – a brief F0 landspout tornado was spotted near Swan River, Manitoba. No damage was reported.
- July 4 – an F1 tornado touched down near Red Deer, Alberta causing minimal tree damage and no injuries.
- July 7 – an F0 tornado was confirmed near Estaire, Ontario
- July 7 – an F0 tornado touched down near Valhalla, Manitoba, 114 km (71 mi) north of Winnipeg
- July 7 – an F0 tornado was confirmed in Elbow, Saskatchewan. No damage was reported.
- July 9 – two tornadoes touched down in Northwestern Ontario, killing three and injuring five. The first, an F1, touched down near Ear Falls and tracked across Wenesaga Lake through sparsely populated areas. It left a 23 km (14 mi) path snapping trees and damaging homes. The second tornado was given an F2 rating and tore through Fisherman's Cove Resort on Lac Seul, killing three men visiting from Oklahoma. Survivors were found in the lake after the storm, tossed there by the extreme winds.
- July 11 – an F1 tornado touched down in Boisbriand, Quebec, just west of Montreal, damaging houses and downing multiple trees. A second tornado also touched down in Mirabel and was given an F0 rating.
- July 13 – an F0 tornado was confirmed near Leader, Saskatchewan.
- July 26 – a landspout tornado briefly touched down near Woodstock, Ontario, downing one tree. It was given an F0 rating.
- July 27 – an F0 tornado was confirmed in Sainte-Christine, Quebec, damaging a shed and uprooting trees. No injuries were reported.
- July 29 – an F0 tornado touched down in the Duberger district of Quebec City, Quebec, uprooting trees and causing roof damage to homes.
- July 30 – Buffalo Narrows, Saskatchewan, saw an F0 tornado touch down. No damage was reported.
- July 31 – an F0 tornado was confirmed near Telford, Manitoba.
- August 1 – an F0 tornado touched down approximately 16 km (9.9 mi) north of Airdrie, Alberta.
- August 4 – an F2 tornado touched down between Déléage and Mont-Laurier, Quebec, leaving a 40 km (25 mi) path of damage. Forty homes sustained damage, with twenty-eight rendered uninhabitable. Cars were tossed around, utility poles and power lines broken, and a number of trees were twisted and uprooted. It was the highest rated tornado in the province since 1994. A cameraman for CFCF-TV and a helicopter pilot were killed a day later while gathering aerial footage of the damage.
- August 20 – nineteen confirmed tornadoes touched down in Ontario, the largest single-day tornado outbreak in the province's history. Referred to as the Southern Ontario Tornado Outbreak of 2009, it was one of the most destructive and costly tornado events ever in the province, and included one fatality. The four strongest tornadoes were given an F2 rating, with two of them hitting the densely populated city of Vaughan. Eleven of the tornadoes were given an F1 rating, and the last four were rated as F0. The lone fatality happened in Durham, Ontario, where an 11-year-old boy was killed by flying debris. At one point, over 10 million people in Southern Ontario were placed under tornado watches and/or warnings. It is also the largest tornado event in Canadian history.
- August 21 – two F0 tornadoes touched down in north central Quebec, one near the Baskatong Reservoir and the other near the town of La Tuque. Minor damage was reported in wooded areas.
- August 22 – a weak F0 tornado touched down in the city of Markham, Ontario, travelling for about 3 km (1.9 mi) and causing minor damage.
- September 28 – an F1 tornado was confirmed near Bowmanville, Ontario, damaging barns and uprooting trees. It travelled for approximately 7 km (4.3 mi) to Orono before dissipating.

2009 Confirmed Tornadoes: BC / AB / SK / MB / ON / QC / NB; 0 / 6 / 6 / 3 / 34 / 8 / 0	2009 Tornado Strengths: F0 / F1 / F2 / F3 / F4 / F5; 30 / 20 / 7 / 0 / 0 / 0

== 2010s ==
=== 2010 ===
- June 5 – a severe weather outbreak that affected the Midwestern United States and Great Lakes region, saw an F1 tornado was touch down in Eastern Ontario, near the villages of Dalkeith and Ste-Anne-de-Prescott, close to the Quebec border. It causing extensive damage to homes, trees and grain bins along an 8 km (5.0 mi) path.
- June 6 – four tornadoes were confirmed in Southwestern Ontario as a result of a severe weather outbreak in the region. Three brief tornadoes, an F0, F1 and F2, touched down south of Harrow, causing property damage. An F1 tornado also hit Leamington during the early morning, before dissipating near Point Pelee National Park. Damage was estimated to be in the millions of dollars, as the tornado uprooted trees and damaged houses and cars, leaving a 7 km (4.3 mi) path. Luckily, considering the time the tornado hit, there were no reports of injuries or deaths.
- June 21 – two weak tornadoes touched down near Limerick and Avonlea, Saskatchewan.
- June 22 – a possible tornado destroyed a garage and ripped a roof off a house in Woodlands, Manitoba, about 60 km (37 mi) north of Winnipeg.
- June 23 – two confirmed tornadoes touched down near the town of Midland, Ontario. The first tornado was rated an F2 and it touched down at approximately 6:30 pm EDT (UTC−04:00) near the Rowntree Beach area and ended near Waubaushene, a length of 25 km (16 mi). A second tornado rated an F1 spawned from the same thunderstorm, touched down around 7 pm EDT (UTC−04:00), just west of Washago. Its path lasted 12 km (7.5 mi). Tornado warnings did go off 12 minutes before the first tornado struck, leaving some residents unprepared. In addition a Red Alert was even issued by the Emergency Management of Ontario in a huge swath of Central Ontario. Both tornadoes left 15 people injured, 8 seriously. There were no fatalities. That same evening after 9 pm EDT (UTC−04:00), storms tracked through the Windsor-Essex County area, where a microburst caused damage near Colchester destroying a party tent and part of a garage, with funnel clouds and a possible tornado reported in the rural areas of the town of Essex, these tornadoes came on the same day just hours after Central Canada was rocked by an earthquake.
- June 23 – a confirmed tornado touched down near Rosser, Manitoba, causing little damage.
- June 24 – a possible tornado touched down near Wilkie, Saskatchewan.
- June 25 – an unconfirmed tornado touched down near Oxbow, Saskatchewan, damaging a farm.
- June 27 – severe thunderstorms formed in Southeast Michigan and tracked towards Windsor, Ontario, spawning a minor tornado from Essex to roughly Staples, with a second forming near Cottam, in central Essex County.
- June 28 – two F0 tornadoes touched down in the Montreal region, one in Sainte-Anne-de-Bellevue, Quebec, on Montreal's West Island, and one in Mascouche, east of the city. Many funnel clouds were also spotted in the area(s).
- June 29 – a confirmed tornado touched down near Whitecourt, Alberta, northwest of Edmonton. No damage was reported.
- July 2 – an F3 tornado tore through the Kawacatoose Reserve near Raymore, Saskatchewan. Some homes on the reserve were demolished, with several others sustaining damage. It also levelled farmhouses and farms west of the town. It left a 500 m (1,600 ft) wide path that was 45 km (28 mi) long. There were no deaths, but some people received broken bones, cuts and bruises. It was stated that the tornado could have possibly been on the ground for an hour.
- July 13 – a confirmed tornado touched down 20 km (12 mi) east of Carman, Manitoba. No rating was given for the tornado, as no damage was reported.
- July 17 – an F0 tornado hit the community of Saint-Lazare, Quebec, near Montreal. The tornado damaged some homes, and toppled trees. Two people were also struck by lightning associated with the storm.
- July 22 – an unconfirmed tornado touched down just north of Regina, Saskatchewan. No damage was reported.
- July 23 – an F0 tornado touched down in Amherstburg, Ontario, around 7 pm EDT (UTC−04:00). The path was around 1 km (0.62 mi) long and 100 m (330 ft) wide. The small tornado travelled directly north for a short distance, damaging trees and a roof on small outbuilding, before turning east and dissipating a short time later. There were no injuries reported. The same system also caused a downburst in Kingsville. Another tornado may have touched down near Ruthven, although nothing has been confirmed.
- July 25 – two confirmed tornadoes were spotted near the town of Lanigan, Saskatchewan, southeast of Saskatoon. Two more tornadoes touched down near the town of Humboldt. Most damage came from the golf-ball-sized hail associated with the storms, which destroyed several crops in the area.
- July 26 – a confirmed tornado touched down near Oakbank, Manitoba, 20 km (12 mi) east of Winnipeg.
- July 30 – around 3:20 pm MDT (UTC−06:00), a confirmed tornado touched down northwest of Sundre, Alberta, 120 km (75 mi) northwest of Calgary. There were reports of heavy rain and large hail, but no damage. Another possible tornado touched down 50 km (31 mi) southwest of Water Valley, but was not confirmed.
- August 22 – A tornado was reported southwest of Grande Prairie, Alberta.

2010 Confirmed Tornadoes
BC	AB	SK	MB	ON	QC	NB
0	3	7	3	8	5	0

=== 2011 ===
- April 27 – Environment Canada confirmed an F0 tornado touched down near the town of Fergus, Ontario, as a part of the 2011 Super Outbreak. Multiple trees were blown over, siding was torn from buildings and a large air conditioning unit was thrown from the roof of a retail store.
- May 28 – a tornado touched down briefly about 10 km (6.2 mi) south of Winnipeg, Manitoba, at about 5:30 pm CDT (UTC−05:00) in St. Adolphe. The tornado was likely an F0, but was not confirmed. It touched down in a field, lifted some debris and then dissipated.
- June 2 – a weak F0 tornado was spotted northwest of Shaunavon, Saskatchewan, as severe thunderstorms hit the area. The Royal Canadian Mounted Police (RCMP) reported damage to granaries in the area, and several power lines were toppled.
- June 23 – an F0 tornado briefly touched down near the Ottawa River and moved towards Aylmer, Quebec. No damage was reported.
- June 23 – an unconfirmed tornado was sighted near Fox Valley, Saskatchewan, about 325 km (202 mi) southwest of Saskatoon. Damage was reported to a hardware store and some city roads. Power lines were also knocked down.
- July 7 – multiple tornadoes touched down in Central Alberta from very strong thunderstorms that swept across the province. One touched down near the town of Bergen, and the others near the towns of Olds and Bowden. One of the hardest hit areas was near Innisfail, where three farms were damaged. A 180,000 sq ft (17,000 m^{2}) riding area was also destroyed. There were also reports of hail the size of softballs causing damage to cars and houses.
- July 13 – a weak F0 tornado touched down in southwestern Calgary, Alberta. It was originally classified a funnel cloud by Environment Canada, but amateur video of the event showed it was a tornado.
- July 18 – a tornado was reported about 15 km (9.3 mi) north of Big River, Saskatchewan, with multiple funnel clouds also reported around the same time. The same storm system later pelted the resort of Waskesiu with baseball-sized hail causing property damage around the townsite with damage to windows, siding and roofs.
- July 20 – an F1 tornado touched down between Saguenay and Quebec City, Quebec. Winds were strong enough to pick up a moving car off the highway.
- July 23 – an F2 tornado touched down southeast of Wyoming, Ontario, and carved a path 500 m (1,600 ft) wide and 11 km (6.8 mi) long. It dissipated just south of Watford, after blowing over eight steel transmission towers and also knocking down several hydro poles. Other damage reports included several trees snapped off and buildings moved from their foundations. One barn was completely destroyed.
- August 6 – an F1 tornado touched down in the village of Sainte-Élisabeth-de-Proulx, Quebec, roughly 30 km (19 mi) north of Lac Saint-Jean. Multiple cottages were damaged, and trees uprooted. Environment Canada is also looking into another possible tornado in the Saint-Ludger-de-Milot area.
- August 8 – a weak F0 tornado occurred in the town of Plattsville, Ontario, about 18 km (11 mi) southwest of Kitchener. There was no damage reported.
- August 16 – four F1 tornadoes touched down in the heavily wooded areas of Northwestern Ontario. The first occurred near Dryden, leaving a 24 km (15 mi) trail. The second touched down about 30 km (19 mi) northwest of Sioux Lookout, leaving a 12 km (7.5 mi) path. The third was confirmed in the Ear Falls-Wenesaga Lake area, about 100 km (62 mi) north of Dryden. It left a very small path of 1 km (0.62 mi). The fourth F1 also touched down in Ear Falls, near Gerry Lake, leaving a 2 km (1.2 mi) path. All four tornadoes were given the F1 rating because of the amount of tree damage, and lack of structural damage.
- August 21 – an F3 tornado hit Goderich, Ontario, in the late afternoon. A supercell thunderstorm formed and intensified over Lake Huron, spawning a waterspout which came ashore and passed directly through the heart of Goderich. At its widest over downtown, the tornado was estimated to be 1.5 km (0.93 mi) across, and its path was an estimated 20 km (12 mi) long. It caused devastating damage to the town's port and historic downtown centre, as well as to several blocks of residential homes. Approximately forty people were injured and one person was killed. It was Ontario's strongest tornado since 1996.
- August 21 – a very weak F1 tornado occurred in the west end of Gananoque, Ontario, twisting trees and demolishing a shed. The track was close to 1.5 km (0.93 mi) before it dissipated.
- August 24 – two confirmed F1 tornadoes hit Southwestern Ontario, after a line of severe storms swept through the province. The first touched down in the town of Little Corners, near Cambridge and left a 15 km (9.3 mi) path of toppled trees. The second touched down 6 km (3.7 mi) west of Nairn and left a 10 km (6.2 mi) trail before it dissipated. A third F0 tornado also touched down in the southwestern part of Grey County, near Neustadt. The track was around 3 km (1.9 mi) long and left damage mostly to trees.
- September 3 – Environment Canada confirmed that an F0 tornado occurred just west of the town of Grimsby, Ontario. A large gazebo was destroyed and branches were knocked from trees. The path of damage was close to 2 km (1.2 mi) long, and the maximum width was around 300 m (980 ft). No injuries were reported.
- September 4 – an F0 tornado hit the western part of Trois-Rivières, Quebec, in the early evening. Damage reports indicated that trees were uprooted, roofs torn off and power was knocked out. The tornado did not last long and there were no reported injuries.
- September 18 – an unconfirmed tornado was spotted east of Winnipeg, Manitoba. No damage was reported, and the tornado did not last very long.

2011 Confirmed Tornadoes
BC	AB	SK	MB	ON	QC	NB
0	1	1	0	14	3	0

=== 2012 ===
- May 22 – a late-afternoon F0 tornado touched down in a field east of Orono, Ontario. It dissipated quickly, and no injuries or damage was reported.
- May 25 – two low-level tornadoes were confirmed in rural areas northwest of Montreal, Quebec. An F0 touched down near the town of Brownsburg-Chatham around 8 pm EDT (UTC−03:00), followed by an F1 that swept through the Saint-Benoît sector of Mirabel. Both tornadoes caused extensive damage estimated to be in the millions. No one was injured.
- May 29 – a confirmed F0 tornado touched down east of Ottawa, in the small community of Bourget, Ontario. The tornado was short lived and caused minor roof damage and uprooted trees.
- June 5 – at least one confirmed tornado touched down 9 km (5.6 mi) south of Taber, Alberta, knocking out power in parts of the town. At least three others were reported near Turin, Brooks, and Bow Island.
- June 8 – an F1 tornado touched down in Huntingdon, Quebec, severely damaging a gas station and uprooting trees.
- June 9 – an unconfirmed tornado touched down north of Stettler, Alberta. Environment Canada referred to it as a "landspout tornado", which is essentially a funnel cloud that touches the ground in a weak thunderstorm system. A farm sustained minor damage to some grain bins, and tree limbs were snapped.
- June 15 – eight tornadoes were confirmed near the communities of Plover Lake, Biggar and Wilkie, Saskatchewan. There were several reports of funnel clouds throughout the evening. No damage was reported.
- June 18 – an F1 tornado touched down near Sioux Lookout, Ontario, knocking down several trees.
- June 26 – a tornado was confirmed near the town of Caron, Saskatchewan, and another was reported near Hodgeville. Environment Canada received 500 reports of funnel clouds over a 36-hour period. Damage was limited to farmers' fields and grain silos, and no injuries were reported.
- July 3 – at least three tornadoes were confirmed in Saskatchewan. One touched down near the town of Davidson, and heavily damaged a farm. The other two touched down southwest of Wynyard and southwest of Watrous. No injuries were reported.
- July 3 – an F1 tornado touched down 13 km (8.1 mi) southwest of Olds, Alberta, taking the roof off a house. Damage was also reported to a barn and hay shed, and multiple trees were uprooted. No injuries were reported.
- July 17 – two tornadoes were confirmed in Eastern Ontario, hitting the small communities of Athens and Summerstown. The Athens tornado was rated an F1, with winds speeds estimated at 140 km/h (87 mph) at touchdown. It left a track of damage 300 m (980 ft) wide and about 3 km (1.9 mi) long. Several trees were snapped off or uprooted, damaging houses and cars. A farm just west of town had several hay wagons flipped over, and it tore the woodshed and chimney off a house. The Summerstown tornado was rated as a likely F0, and its path was 30 m (98 ft) wide and about 2 km (1.2 mi) long. Several trees were knocked down, and crops sustained some damage.
- July 18 – three confirmed tornadoes touched down in central parts of Saskatchewan. The tornadoes were reported east of Rose Valley, and at least two more were spotted north and east of Wadena. No damage was reported.
- July 21 – two confirmed tornadoes touched down in near Smeaton, Saskatchewan, where a house was destroyed, and a 72-year-old man inside escaped unharmed. It also knocked trees down and grain bins over. A second reported tornado touched down near Emma Lake. There were no reports of damage.
- July 22 – an F0 tornado touched down near the town of Embro, Ontario. An Environment Canada employee witnessed the weak tornado in a field; It left no damage.
- July 24 – Environment Canada confirmed that five tornadoes touched down in Saskatchewan. All were east of Regina, near communities of Balgonie, Southey, Fillmore, and Grenfell. Minor damage was reported to farm buildings. There was no official word on the strengths of the tornadoes.
- July 28 – a brief tornado touched down about 10 km (6.2 mi) south of Cremona, Alberta. Damage was reported to a nearby farm.
- August 2 – an unconfirmed tornado touched down near Lake Diefenbaker, around the town of Elbow, Saskatchewan. No damage or injuries were reported.
- August 11 – an F0 tornado was confirmed near Midland, Ontario.
- August 30 – an F0 tornado touched down near Chibougamau, Quebec. Damage was reported at a campground where several trees were uprooted.
- September 8 – an early evening F0 tornado touched down in Drummondville, Quebec. A roof was blown off a 4-storey building and thrown across the street while other buildings and vehicles sustained minor damage.
- September 8 – Environment Canada confirmed that an F2 tornado touched down near the town of Odessa, Ontario. The path was estimated to be 6 km (3.7 mi) long, and it destroyed a large workshop, throwing the roof 300 m (1,000 ft). A man was in the workshop at the time of the tornado, but escaped uninjured.
- September 22 – an F0 tornado was confirmed in the small town of Wellington, Ontario, along the shoreline of Lake Ontario. Environment Canada said it was possible the tornado formed originally as a waterspout over the lake. Two properties received minor damage to lawn furniture and trees.
- October 31 – a weak F0 tornado touched down near the town of Mont-Laurier, Quebec, destroying a barn and blowing road signs over. It was the sixth confirmed tornado for Quebec in 2012, and the final tornado rated using the Fujita scale in Canada.

2012 Confirmed Tornadoes
BC	AB	SK	MB	ON	QC	NB
0	7	33	3	9	6	0

=== 2013 ===
- April 18 – Environment Canada confirmed that an EF1 tornado touched down near the community of Shelburne, Ontario, destroying a large riding stable. The path of the tornado was 10 km (6.2 mi) long and around 75 m (246 ft) wide. No injuries were reported. This tornado represented the change from the Fujita scale, to the Enhanced Fujita scale in Canada.
- May 21 – three tornadoes were confirmed in Central Ontario after strong thunderstorms moved across the region. The highest rated was an EF2, which touched down near Glenarm, 12 km (7.5 mi) west of Fenelon Falls. The roof of a home was torn off by the strong winds. The other two tornadoes were rated EF0; the first touching down in the community of Elmvale, south of Midland, and the other near Dalston, 12 km (7.5 mi) north of Barrie. Minor damage was reported to a barn roof and silo, and around 65 mature trees were uprooted.
- May 22 – an EF0 tornado touched down on Highway 401 near Mallorytown, Ontario. It occurred at 10:30 pm EDT (UTC−04:00) and forcibly moved a truck.
- May 29 – an EF0 tornado touched down near Casselman, Ontario, and was confirmed by Environment Canada thanks to amateur video of the funnel cloud lowering. Minor wind damage was reported along a narrow path of 9 km (5.6 mi) in length.
- June 1 – an EF0 tornado touched down near Kenilworth, Ontario, and was on the ground for around one minute. Because of the remote location, no damage was reported.
- June 1 – an EF0 tornado was confirmed in the municipality of Saint-Hugues, Quebec. It tore the door off a garage and caused minor roof damage to multiple homes.
- June 2 – Environment Canada confirmed that a tornado touched down briefly near Maple Creek, Saskatchewan. No rating was given for the tornado, and no damage or injuries were reported.
- June 10 – an unconfirmed tornado touched down southeast of Yorkton, Saskatchewan, near the town of Saltcoats. It is unknown if it did any damage.
- June 12 – a tornado was reported on the north side of Pigeon Lake, Alberta. It was on the ground very briefly before it went over the lake, resulting in a waterspout.
- June 16 – a low-end EF0 tornado was confirmed near Beaver Lake, Ontario, about 46 km (29 mi) southwest of Sudbury. The tornado was confirmed based upon photographic evidence, showing a weak funnel cloud rotating and briefly reaching the ground. No damage was reported.
- June 19 – an unconfirmed tornado was reported north of Onefour, near Pakowki Lake. Multiple photos uploaded to Twitter showed funnel clouds and possible tornado on the ground.
- June 28 – the ninth confirmed tornado of the season struck near the town of Springwater, Ontario, about 10 km (6.2 mi) northwest of Barrie. It was rated as a low end EF0, and no damage was reported.
- July 4 – a confirmed tornado touched down near Dollard, Saskatchewan, about 15 km (9.3 mi) west of Shaunavon. Trees were knocked over and some homes and businesses sustained damage. No injuries were reported. An unconfirmed tornado was also spotted near Stavely, Alberta, related to the same storm system.
- July 6 - a brief tornado was reported between Wroxton and Kamsack, Saskatchewan.
- July 10 – at around 6:20 pm EDT (UTC−04:00), a weak EF0 tornado touched down near Saint-Marc-des-Carrières, Quebec. No damage was reported.
- July 13 – the communities of Pipestone and Hartney, Manitoba, were hit by two unconfirmed tornadoes in the early evening, causing damage to multiple homes. Roofs were ripped off, trees knocked over, and mobile homes and trailers were overturned. The storm also brought large hail and heavy rain, causing extensive crop damage.
- July 13 – Environment Canada confirmed two tornadoes struck southern Saskatchewan, near the communities of Minton and Redvers. No damage was reported.
- July 15 – up to seven tornadoes touched down in parts of southern Saskatchewan after a severe line of thunderstorms swept through the province. Four tornadoes were confirmed by Environment Canada, two of them spotted close to the towns of Kronau and Gray. The other two confirmed were spotted west and southwest of Yorkton. The three unconfirmed tornadoes were reported north of Humboldt, near Rosthern, and near Hague. No damage or injuries were reported.
- July 18 – a strong EF0 tornado was confirmed in Sioux Valley First Nation, about 50 km (31 mi) west of Brandon, Manitoba. Five homes on the reserve were damaged and two people were injured.
- July 18 – an EF1 tornado was confirmed north of Massey, Ontario, 85 km (53 mi) southwest of Sudbury. It left a path 250 m (820 ft) wide and 7 km (4.3 mi) long. One house was damaged, and numerous trees were knocked over. No injuries were reported.
- July 19 – a weak EF0 tornado touched down near the community of Teviotdale, Ontario, just south of Mount Forest. No injuries or damage was reported.
- July 20 – an EF1 tornado touched down in the Grand Lake, new Brunswick area, about 40 km (25 mi) east of Fredericton. The damage path was close to 15 km (9.3 mi) long, between the communities of Jemseg and Codys. The hardest hit areas included Whites Cove, where several trees were uprooted and three barns destroyed, and Cambridge-Narrows, where three more structures were destroyed including a large barn.
- July 21 – Environment Canada confirmed a tornado touched down between Boissevain and Deloraine, Manitoba, in an open field. No damage was reported.
- July 24 – a tornado was reported on the ground near Okotoks, Alberta.
- July 24 – a small tornado was confirmed near Morris, Manitoba, 60 km (37 mi) south of Winnipeg. It was on the ground for a brief period and confined to a farmer's field. No damage was reported.
- July 29 – Environment Canada confirmed an EF0 tornado touched down in Ottawa, close to Orleans, Ontario. Most of the damage was confined to the Pine View Golf Course where it left a 100 m (330 ft) wide path and uprooted more than 20 trees. No injuries were reported.
- August 1 – a low end EF0 tornado was confirmed near Carleton Place, Ontario, about 45 km (28 mi) west of Ottawa. Environment Canada used an eye-witness account to confirm the tornado. No damage was reported.
- August 2 – Environment Canada confirmed an EF0 touched down in Magiskan Lake, north of Cochrane, Ontario. No injuries or damage was reported.
- August 7 – three EF0 tornadoes, and one EF1 tornado were confirmed in south-central Ontario within a one-hour period, thanks to video and photographic evidence. The first tornado touched down north of Orillia, followed by another between Arthur and Grand Valley. The third tornado happened near Carnarvon. The strongest tornado happened 5 km (3.1 mi) north of Haliburton, uprooting trees and snapping branches. An aerial survey was conducted since it was in such a remote location. No injuries or major damage was reported. In addition to these tornadoes, Environment Canada also added one that was previously classified as a waterspout. It happened over Head Lake, in the northern part of the Kawartha Lakes region. The waterspout was added to the 2013 tornado count because in this case, it was associated with a storm system.
- August 13 – a weak EF0 tornado hit Sherbrooke, Quebec, causing roof damage to a car dealership and breaking several windows.
- August 16 – a small EF0 tornado touched down in the Cabano, Quebec, area before moving out over Lake Témiscouata and turning into a waterspout. No damage was reported.
- September 1 – a confirmed tornado touched down near Fergus, Ontario, in a farmer's field. Environment Canada classified it as a low end EF0 tornado since no damage was reported. Another tornado was reported just 30 minutes later in a field west of Salem, 25 km (16 mi) northwest of Guelph. It was also rated as a low end EF0 in strength
- November 23 – a rare, late season tornado was confirmed north of Prescott, Ontario. The tornado was rated as an EF1, and caused significant structural damage to a farm silo. No injuries were reported.

2013 Confirmed Tornadoes
BC	AB	SK	MB	ON	QC	NB
0	4	13	5	22	4	1

=== 2014 ===
- May 13 – Environment Canada confirmed two tornadoes touched down in Southern Ontario. The first, an EF1, touched down in the Midlmay area, 100 km (62 mi) northwest of Kitchener. The small tornado had a 2 km (1.2 mi) path and was around 150 m (490 ft) wide. A house and barn sustained damage and multiple trees were snapped. The second tornado was rated an EF0, and spotted southeast of Listowel, near Conestogo Lake. The path was approximately 8 km (5.0 mi) long, with no significant damage.
- May 26 – a weak EF0 tornado touched down near Roxton Falls, Quebec, tearing the roof from a farm building. Another tornado was confirmed near Laurierville thanks to video evidence, but was not given a rating.
- June 13 – a confirmed tornado touched down northwest of Gleichen, Alberta in the early evening. Two funnel clouds were noticed with one briefly touching the ground. No damage was reported.
- June 17 – two tornadoes were confirmed in Central Ontario, the first being a high-end EF2, which hit the town of Angus. Around 100 homes were either destroyed or sustained damage before the tornado dissipated in the south end of Barrie. A tornado warning was in effect for the area at the time, and only a few minor injuries were reported. The second tornado, an EF1, touched down near the Stroud area, and left a 750 m (2,460 ft) path of uprooted trees and destroyed a farm shed. The same system also produced two unconfirmed tornadoes, one in Grey County, near Owen Sound Billy Bishop Regional Airport, and another near the town of Hanover.
- June 24 – Southern Ontario again saw two confirmed tornadoes, spawning from the same storm system. The first, an EF1, traveled 7 km (4.3 mi) from Orangeville to Amaranth, destroying a recreational vehicle (RV) and causing damage to the roof of a house. It also downed numerous trees and snapped hydro poles. The second, also an EF1, happened around a half hour later in the town of New Tecumseth, northeast of Orangeville. It damaged 18 properties along a 10 km (6.2 mi) path, including a horse barn where a horse perished. A house also sustained major damage to the garage where the roof was torn off. No injuries were reported from either tornado.
- June 27 – a tornado briefly touched down 16 km (9.9 mi) south of Cremona, Alberta, and was confirmed by Environment Canada based on multiple images of an apparent dust cloud at the base of the funnel. No damage was reported.
- June 29 – a tornado was confirmed near Wainwright, Alberta thanks to photo and video evidence. No damage was reported.
- June 30 – a confirmed EF0 tornado touched down over Bear Lake, Ontario, and was caught on video by a boater. The video shows the tornado crossing the lake and then head inland, where it quickly dissipated. Only minor tree damage was reported.
- June 30 – an EF0 tornado was confirmed in the municipality of Laforce, Quebec, uprooting several trees.
- July 5 – a confirmed tornado touched down in Hartney, Manitoba, 80 km (50 mi) southwest of Brandon. No damage was reported and it was on the ground for under a minute.
- July 5 – Environment Canada confirmed six tornadoes touched down in central Saskatchewan, giving ratings to two. An EF2 touched down 20 km (12 mi) north of Outlook, and caused extensive damage to farm buildings and trees. An EF0 was also confirmed in Kenaston, knocking over tombstones in a cemetery and damaging trees. The other four tornadoes were not rated and were only on the ground for a brief period. They happened northwest and southwest of Kenaston, and the last two were observed 15 km (9.3 mi) north of Davidson, both being on the ground simultaneously.
- July 7 – a brief tornado was reported and later confirmed near Norwich, Ontario, south of Woodstock. Environment Canada confirmed the low end EF0 tornado thanks to photographic evidence. No injuries or damage was reported.
- July 9 – an early morning storm system spawned three tornadoes in southern Quebec. An EF1 tornado touched down near the Sainte-Apolline-de-Patton region, damaging two homes. A second EF1 also touched down near Lambton with minor damage reported. The third tornado struck near Saint-Fabien-de-Panet and was rated an EF2. It caused significant tree damage to a large wooded area. Tornado warnings were in place for both areas at the time.
- July 15 – two EF0 tornadoes were confirmed near North Bay, Ontario, after strong thunderstorms moved through the area. The first was actually a waterspout over Lake Nipissing, but Environment Canada included it in the tornado count since it was associated with a thunderstorm over a small body of water. The second tornado touched down just south of North Bay/Jack Garland Airport. No damage was reported with either tornado.
- July 26 – three weak tornadoes were confirmed in Manitoba according to Environment Canada. The first two touched the ground briefly near Waterhen, and the third just southeast of La Salle. The tornadoes were not given a rating and there were no reports of damage.
- July 27 – two tornadoes touched down in Southern Ontario from the result of severe thunderstorms. The first was rated an EF1 and touched down south of Grand Bend, snapping hydro poles and knocking over trees. Some homes and vehicles were also damaged with one serious injury reported. The second confirmed tornado was reported by storm spotters near Millbank, 30 km (19 mi) northwest of Kitchener. Spotters described seeing swirling dust and debris at the bottom of a funnel cloud, indicating that a tornado briefly formed. The tornado was given a low EF0 rating and no damage was reported.
- July 31 – an EF1 tornado hit the small community of Pont-Rouge, Quebec, as confirmed by Environment Canada, causing significant damage to the roof of a house. Trees were also uprooted and shed was blown away. No injuries were reported.
- August 5 – Environment Canada confirmed a weak EF0 tornado touched down in Asubpeeschoseewagong First Nation (Grassy Narrows First Nation) community in Northwestern Ontario, causing damage to the roof of one house. The tornado was confirmed thanks to eyewitness accounts, archived radar data and photographic evidence.
- August 19 – two EF0 tornadoes were confirmed by Environment Canada in Southwestern Ontario. The first touched down in Windsor and left a damage path 1.5 km (0.93 mi) long and 150 m (490 ft) wide. A number of trees were snapped and a gazebo was destroyed. The second tornado occurred northeast of Harrow where a barn lost part of its roof.
- August 20 – a short lived EF0 tornado was confirmed near the town of Erin, Ontario, thanks to video evidence. No damage was reported.
- September 5 – two tornadoes were confirmed in Central Ontario after severe weather swept through the area. The first, a low-end EF0, hit Christian Island causing tree damage. The second tornado was rated an EF1 and touched down in the town of Udney, about 20 km (12 mi) east of Orillia. Six farms, three houses and a community centre storage building were damaged. No injuries were reported.
- September 10 – an EF1 tornado was confirmed near Port Alma, Ontario, 35 km (22 mi) southwest of Chatham-Kent. Multiple trees were snapped along a 900-metre path.
- October 6 – a low-end EF1 tornado hit the village of Sheffield, Ontario, about 35 km (22 mi) northwest of Hamilton. It damaged homes along a 1.5 km (0.93 mi) long path, ripping shingles from roofs and destroying a travel trailer. No injuries were reported.

2014 Confirmed Tornadoes: BC / AB / SK / MB / ON / QC / NB / TOTAL; 0 / 3 / 6 / 4 / 20 / 7 / 0 / 40	2014 Tornado Strengths: NR / EF0 / EF1 / EF2 / EF3 / EF4 / EF5; 12 / 14 / 11 / 3 / 0 / 0 / 0

=== 2015 ===
- May 30 – an EF1 tornado briefly touched down near the community of Bryanston, Ontario, 18 km (11 mi) northeast of London, ripping the roof off a barn. No injuries were reported.
- June 4 – Environment Canada confirmed an EF0 landspout tornado touched down 5 km (3.1 mi) northwest of Airdrie, Alberta. No damage was reported.
- June 22 – an EF0 tornado was confirmed near Holmesville, Ontario, 15 km (9.3 mi) southeast of Goderich. A photo posted to Twitter from a storm chaser in the area showed what appeared to be a tornado on the ground. Environment Canada cited "there was minor damage reported in the area, as well as evidence that objects "moved in different directions"". No injuries were reported.
- June 21 – an unrated tornado was confirmed by Environment Canada near Cochrane, Alberta. Funnel cloud advisories had been in effect for much of Southern Alberta throughout the day.
- June 24 – two EF0 landspout tornadoes were confirmed in southern Manitoba near the town of Manitou. The first touched down 3 km (1.9 mi) east of the town, and within 30 minutes a second was spotted 7 km (4.3 mi) northwest. Damage was localized to field crops and no injuries were reported. Parts of the province had been under tornado warnings at the time.
- July 12 – an unrated, small rope-like tornado touched down south of Ninette, Manitoba, about 200 km (120 mi) southwest of Winnipeg. Storm spotters reported it was on the ground for 3 to 5 minutes. No damage or injuries were reported.
- July 18 – an unrated landspout tornado was confirmed by Environment Canada near Winnipeg Beach, Manitoba, 56 km (35 mi) north of Winnipeg. The weak tornado was on land for approximately 20–30 minutes. There were no reports of injuries or damage.
- July 22 – a tornado was confirmed near the village of Priddis, Alberta, 40 km (25 mi) southwest of Calgary. Video evidence helped Environment Canada to confirm the brief touchdown, but they did not give it a rating. There were no reports of major damage. Another unrated tornado was also confirmed near Gleichen, causing no damage.
- July 27 – a high end EF2 tornado was confirmed near Tilston, Manitoba, close to the Manitoba–Saskatchewan and Canada–US borders. The large tornado was up to a kilometre wide at one point, and multiple vortices were seen swirling in fields. It severely damaged a farm, overturning trucks and destroying outbuildings and grain bins. A bridge was also damaged on Provincial Road 256, lifting asphalt from the road. Most significantly it was on the ground for 2.5 to 3 hours, making it the longest lived tornado documented in Canada and possibly one of the longest lived in the world. There were no reports of injuries.
- August 2 – four tornadoes were confirmed in Southern Ontario after severe storms swept through the southwestern and central parts of the province. An EF2 touched down near Teviotdale, 55 km (34 mi) northwest of Guelph. It destroyed a barn, and severely damaged two houses. Five Ontario Provincial Police (OPP) cruisers also sustained damage. Another EF2 was confirmed in Lebanon, 20 km (12 mi) southeast of Listowel, damaging barns and silos, and lifting a sailboat into a line of trees. It left a damage path approximately 5 km (3.1 mi) long. A third tornado, rated an EF1, touched down near Marsville, 15 km (9.3 mi) southwest of Orangeville. It left a damage path 2 km (1.2 mi) long, snapping trees and overturning a feed barn. Another EF1 was confirmed in the Millgrove area, north of Hamilton, leaving a small damage path with damage to roofs and trees. Luckily no injuries were reported.
- August 3 – an EF0 tornado was confirmed in the Matapedia Valley, Quebec, near the parish municipality of Saint-Zénon-du-Lac-Humqui. It caused damage to a farm, completely destroying a warehouse and left a damage path of 2 km (1.2 mi) long and 18 m (60 ft) wide in a nearby wooded area. No injuries were reported.
- August 5 – Alberta, a tornado was reported on the ground by storm spotters near Langdon, about 35 km (22 mi) east of Calgary. No damage was reported, but Environment Canada later confirmed it as an unrated tornado.
- August 6 – a tornado was confirmed near Foremost, Alberta, 115 km (71 mi) southeast of Lethbridge. There were no reports of damage.
- August 7 – an unrated tornado was confirmed near Anola, Manitoba, about 39 km (24 mi) east of Winnipeg. No damage was reported.
- August 19 – an EF1 tornado touched down in a wooded area northeast of Kapuskasing, Ontario, leaving a narrow swath of tree damage 150 m (490 ft) wide and 3.5 km (2.2 mi) long. Environment Canada was notified of the tree damage thanks to a pilot flying over the area.
- September 1 - a funnel cloud was reported to have briefly touched down in the waters near Conception Bay South, Newfoundland and Labrador, thus deeming it a waterspout.
- September 13 – an unrated tornado was confirmed near Didsbury, Alberta causing no damage.
- October 15 – an EF0 tornado was confirmed in Coniston, Ontario, just east of Sudbury thanks to video evidence and eyewitness reports. Multiple trees were snapped, some homes sustained roof damage and a trampoline was lifted 200 ft (61 m) in the air. No injuries were reported.

2015 Confirmed Tornadoes: BC / AB / SK / MB / ON / QC / NL / TOTAL; 0 / 7 / 0 / 6 / 8 / 1 / 1 / 23	2015 Tornado Strengths: NR / EF0 / EF1 / EF2 / EF3 / EF4 / EF5; 10 / 6 / 4 / 3 / 0 / 0 / 0

=== 2016 ===
- March 16 – the earliest confirmed tornado in the province's history touched down near Mount Forest, Ontario, damaging a barn and uprooting trees. It was given an EF1 rating and left a path approximately 3.5 km (2.2 mi) long. No injuries were reported.
- April 13 – an EF0 landspout tornado was confirmed just outside the city of Calgary, Alberta, causing no damage.
- May 21 – an unrated tornado was confirmed 8 km (5.0 mi) south of Kincaid, Saskatchewan.
- May 31 – Environment Canada confirmed an EF0 landspout tornado touched down east of Miami, Manitoba, causing no damage.
- June 2 – an EF0 tornado touched down in Maniwaki, Quebec, damaging buildings and uprooting trees. No injuries were reported.
- June 3 – Environment Canada confirmed an unrated landspout tornado touched down about 3 km (1.9 mi) southwest of Elgin, Manitoba. It was on the ground for under 5 minutes and no damage was reported.
- June 19 – two unrated landspout tornadoes were confirmed by Environment Canada near Naicam, Saskatchewan. Both tornadoes were on the ground for less than 5 minutes and caused no damage.
- June 19 – a confirmed landspout tornado touched down 43 km (27 mi) southwest of Grand Rapids, Manitoba. No damage was reported.
- June 20 – an EF2 tornado touched down near Lac Verne, Quebec, destroying a cottage and snapping multiple trees. Two people were seriously injured.
- June 30 – an EF1 tornado was confirmed in Ponoka, Alberta, causing damage to a handful of homes. No injuries were reported.
- July 1 – two EF0 tornadoes touched down in Central Ontario causing minimal damage. The first occurred over Buckhorn Lake, in Peterborough County. The second tornado was confirmed near Swift Rapids, southwest of Gravenhurst, leaving a narrow damage path about 30 m (98 ft) wide, along the lakeshore.
- July 1 – an EF0 tornado was confirmed by Environment Canada 20 km (12 mi) west of Didsbury, Alberta causing no damage.
- July 1 – a confirmed tornado touched down west of Biggar, Saskatchewan, in a farmer's field. It was not given a rating and lasted about 5 minutes.
- July 2 – two EF0 tornadoes were confirmed in Alberta. The first touched down 8 km (5.0 mi) south of Longview, snapping several trees. The second was confirmed approximately 5 km (3.1 mi) northwest of Pekisko causing no damage.
- July 3 – Environment Canada confirmed an EF1 tornado touched down near Hardisty, Alberta, damaging a farm in the area.
- July 4 – an EF0 tornado touched down in the area of Métabetchouan–Lac-à-la-Croix, uprooting trees and damaging a farm building.
- July 6 – a weak EF0 was confirmed through Environment Canada near Monitor, Alberta causing no damage.
- July 7 – Environment Canada confirmed a non-rated landspout tornado touched down southeast of Estevan, Saskatchewan. No damage was reported.
- July 10 – an unrated tornado was confirmed near Herbert, Saskatchewan
- July 13 – an EF0 landspout tornado was confirmed northeast of Endiang, Alberta causing no damage.
- July 17 – a weak EF0 tornado was confirmed 10 km (6.2 mi) northeast of Okotoks, Alberta causing minor roof damage to homes.
- July 18 – an EF1 tornado touched down near Roxton Falls, Quebec, in the municipality of Ulverton, destroying a barn and uprooting trees.
- July 19 – an EF2 tornado was confirmed near Davidson, Saskatchewan, destroying multiple farm buildings.
- July 20 – three tornadoes were confirmed in southern Manitoba, the largest given a preliminary EF1 rating and touching down in the southern part of Long Plain First Nation. Roofs were blown off houses, trees uprooted and some homes were separated from their foundations. It lasted approximately 15 minutes and was on the ground for 9 km (5.6 mi). The two other weak tornadoes touched down near Hartney, and Souris, causing no damage.
- July 23 – an unrated tornado touched down near Sturgis, Saskatchewan
- July 23 – Environment Canada confirmed a landspout tornado touched down briefly near Russell, Manitoba. There was no reported damage.
- July 31 – two EF2 tornadoes were confirmed in East Central Saskatchewan, destroying a house and leaving significant damage to several farms. The first tornado touched down 14 km (8.7 mi) north of Melville, and the second was confirmed near Otthon. Another brief unrated tornado was also confirmed near Rokeby, 15 km (9.3 mi) southeast of Yorkton. No injuries were reported.
- July 31 – a tornado was confirmed 15 km (9.3 mi) south of Camperville, Manitoba, causing no damage.
- August 3 – three tornadoes were confirmed in southern Manitoba, the first touching down near Margaret. It was short lived, causing minor damage. A second tornado hit areas west of Glenboro and destroyed a barn, killing 150 sheep. A third tornado was confirmed near Morden, uprooting trees.
- August 3 – Environment Canada confirmed two unrated tornadoes touched down in Saskatchewan. The first touched down 10 km (6.2 mi) northeast of Bethune, and the second was confirmed north of Rhein.
- August 4 – a probable landspout tornado touched down east of Vermilion, Alberta. No damage was reported.
- August 8 – four tornadoes were confirmed in Manitoba by Environment Canada, including two given a preliminary mid to high end EF2 rating. The first touched down in Waywayseecappo First Nation, 280 km (170 mi) northwest of Winnipeg. Seven homes were damaged and one destroyed and the tornado also overturned a school bus. The second EF2 occurred northeast of Erickson, causing roof damage and destroying small structures. Extensive damage was also caused to a nearby forest. Another tornado touched down south of Russell and was given a preliminary rating of EF0 based on tree damage. An unrated fourth tornado occurred near Elphinstone.
- August 10 – an unrated landspout tornado was confirmed north of Schuler, Alberta causing no damage.
- August 11 – a weak EF0 tornado touched down in Delaware, Ontario, removing siding from homes and damaging a crop of corn.
- August 13 – an EF1 tornado was confirmed in the Port Bolster and Sunset Beach communities of Georgina, Ontario, damaging a boat shelter and other buildings. A second, EF0 tornado also touched down near Ashburn, snapping trees and causing crop damage.
- August 21 – an EF0 tornado was confirmed 30 km (19 mi) northwest of Edson, Alberta, causing tree damage.
- August 24 – two tornadoes touched down in Essex County, Ontario, after a supercell thunderstorm developed over the Detroit River. An EF1 was confirmed in LaSalle, lasting for approximately 2 km (1.2 mi) and leaving minimal damage. After it lifted, another stronger tornado, an EF2, struck the nearby city of Windsor. It damaged multiple buildings near the E. C. Row Expressway and Central Avenue along an 8 km (5.0 mi) path. Three people were injured.
- August 24 – an unconfirmed landspout tornado occurred near Eddystone, Manitoba. No damage was reported.
- August 26 - a tornado was confirmed near Melfort, Saskatchewan.
- August 30 – an EF0 landspout tornado briefly touched down 20 km (12 mi) north of New Liskeard, Ontario, causing no damage.
- September 10 – a thunderstorm producing a waterspout over Lake Ontario that came ashore as an EF0 tornado in Prince Edward County, Ontario, tracking 3.5 km (2.2 mi) to the east before dissipating. The tornado snapped limbs off trees and caused minor property damage. No injuries were reported.
- October 17 – an EF1 tornado was confirmed in Stayner, Ontario, snapping multiple trees and overturning a large camper trailer.

2016 Confirmed Tornadoes: BC / AB / SK / MB / ON / QC / NB / TOTAL; 0 / 12 / 14 / 15 / 11 / 4 / 0 / 56	2016 Tornado Strengths: NR / EF0 / EF1 / EF2 / EF3 / EF4 / EF5; 23 / 18 / 8 / 7 / 0 / 0 / 0

=== 2017 ===
- April 11 - an EF1 tornado was confirmed near Thamesford, Ontario, northeast of London, damaging a barn and knocking over utility poles along an 11 km (6.8 mi) path. No injuries were reported.
- May 14 - two landspout tornadoes were confirmed north of Saskatoon, Saskatchewan, near the towns of Hepburn and Hoey. Damage to a horse shed was reported.
- June 2 - an EF1 tornado touched down near Three Hills, Alberta, approximately 125 km (78 mi) northeast of Calgary, snapping trees, damaging a roof and destroying an RV. No injuries were reported.
- June 9 - Environment Canada confirmed an EF0 landspout touched down in Mannville, Alberta, 170 km (110 mi) east of Edmonton. No damage was reported.
- June 14 - a tornado was confirmed near Dryden, Ontario.
- June 18 - eleven tornadoes were confirmed in Quebec, marking the province's largest tornado outbreak ever recorded. The strongest, an EF3, struck near Sainte-Anne-des-Lacs, Quebec, completely leveling two homes along a 30 km (19 mi) track. Four EF2 tornadoes touched down including one near Hébertville, which left a damage path 22.5 km (14.0 mi) in length. Five EF1 tornadoes were also confirmed, as well as an EF0 in the Laurentides Wildlife Reserve. Originally only four tornadoes were confirmed, but the total was changed in 2018 after extensive research thanks to a team from Western University and Environment and Climate Change Canada embarked on a challenging and far-reaching study called The Northern Tornadoes Project.
- June 21 - an EF0 tornado touched down near Sapotaweyak Cree Nation in Manitoba, approximately 600 km (370 mi) northwest of Winnipeg. It lasted only a few minutes and no damage was reported.
- July 1 - an EF0 tornado was confirmed near Sangudo, Alberta, approximately 120 km (75 mi) northwest of Edmonton. A meteorologist with Environment Canada said the touchdown was brief and no one was injured.
- July 5 - an EF2 tornado touched down in Alida, Saskatchewan, severely damaging a house. No injuries were reported.
- July 6 - an EF2 tornado was confirmed in Quetico Provincial Park in northwestern Ontario thanks to aerial reconnaissance by the Provincial Ministry of Natural Resources and Forestry. It flattened trees along a 100 meter wide and 2 km (1.2 mi) long path in the Ottertrack Lake area. No injuries were reported.
- July 9 - Sunchild First Nation, Alberta was hit with an EF0 tornado causing no damage.
- July 10 -An EF0 tornado was confirmed 13 km (8.1 mi) northwest of Calgary International Airport. No damage was reported.
- July 10 - an unconfirmed tornado was reported on the ground approximately 8 km (5.0 mi) west of Laporte, Saskatchewan.
- July 12 - two EF0 tornadoes were confirmed in Ontario, the first touching down north of Lucan, leaving a 170 meter wide, 5 km (3.1 mi) damage path and overturning multiple camper trailers at a local storage facility. The second tornado formed over Lake Simcoe as a tornadic waterspout. No damage was reported.
- July 13 - Two tornadoes were confirmed in Alberta after severe weather swept through the province. The first, an EF1, touched down 5 km (3.1 mi) northwest of Breton, Alberta snapping multiple trees and damaging roofs. The second tornado touched down near Athabasca over an open field and no damage was reported. The tornado was given a preliminary EF0 rating. No injuries were reported.
- July 21 - Six tornadoes were confirmed in southern Saskatchewan; the first two touching down north of Lanigan. The other four touched down near the town of Quill Lake, near Fishing Lake, near Jansen and between Wapella and Rocanville. Environment Canada has not yet rated any of these tornadoes, and no damage was reported.
- July 25 - an unrated tornado was confirmed near Dryden, Ontario.
- August 4 - three tornadoes were confirmed in Ontario's Cottage country after an afternoon of severe weather. The first tornado, an EF1, touched down near the community of Utterson, leaving a 4.2 km (2.6 mi) long path, snapping numerous trees. The second, also an EF1, left a 1 km (0.62 mi) damage path on the south side of Huntsville before heading out over Fairy Lake as a tornadic waterspout. Trees were snapped, docks were flipped and many cottages sustained roof damage. The third tornado was rated as an EF2 and touched down in the Lake of Bays area. It carved a 9 km (5.6 mi) path from Pell Lake to Dotty Lake, snapping numerous trees and causing structural damage to cottages. No injuries were reported.
- August 5 - an EF1 tornado touched down in Saint-Joseph-de-Beauce, Quebec, snapping trees and destroying buildings. The damage was contained to 4 properties in the area and no injuries were reported.
- August 11 - Environment Canada confirmed two tornadoes touched down in Southern Ontario. The first occurred nearLeamington, and damaged solar panels and a greenhouse. It was given an EF0 rating. The second was a much stronger EF2 tornado, and struck near Hawkesville, approximately 20 km (12 mi) northwest of Waterloo. It tore a 5 km (3.1 mi) path which damaged farm buildings and sheds, knocked heavy machinery over and snapped power poles. Luckily no injuries were reported.
- August 22 - an EF1 tornado touched down in Lachute, Quebec, approximately 62 km (39 mi) northwest of Montreal, destroying 20 homes and damaging over 300. No injuries were reported.
- September 22 - an EF0 tornado touched down in Northwestern Ontario near Werner Lake, approximately 80 km (50 mi) northwest of Kenora, damaging a remote cabin and nearby trees. No injuries were reported.
- October 7 - a weak, EF0 tornado was confirmed near Jenner, Alberta, approximately 100 km (62 mi) northwest of Medicine Hat. No damage was reported.
- October 15 - an EF0 tornado touched down in Mont-Laurier, Quebec, approximately 240 km (150 mi) northwest of Montreal, damaging 6 homes. No injuries were reported.

2017 Confirmed Tornadoes: BC / AB / SK / MB / ON / QC / NB / TOTAL; 0 / 8 / 9 / 1 / 12 / 14 / 0 / 44	2017 Tornado Strengths: NR / EF0 / EF1 / EF2 / EF3 / EF4 / EF5; 11 / 12 / 11 / 9 / 1 / 0 / 0

=== 2018 ===
- May 24 - an EF0 landspout tornado was confirmed near Calmar, Alberta causing no damage.
- May 24 - two landspout tornadoes were confirmed in southern Saskatchewan near Tyvan and Gerald.
- June 13 - two tornadoes were confirmed in Southern Ontario after strong storms swept through the province. The first, an EF2, touched down near Waterford and left a damage path 32 km (20 mi) long before dissipating near the shores of Lake Erie. Several barns were destroyed, multiple buildings sustained roof damage and trees were uprooted and sheared apart. One person sustained minor injuries. The second tornado, an EF0, briefly touched down near Norwich causing minimal damage.
- June 14 - an unrated tornado was confirmed by Environment and Climate Change Canada near Waskada, Manitoba, approximately 330 km (210 mi) southwest of Winnipeg. No damage was reported.
- June 23 - an EF0 landspout tornado was confirmed near Griffin, Saskatchewan, 30 km (19 mi) east of Weyburn. No damage was reported.
- June 30 - an EF0 tornado was confirmed near Pauingassi First Nation, approximately 280 km (170 mi) northeast of Winnipeg, Manitoba, causing no damage.
- July 1 - a waterspout tornado was confirmed over Lake Manitoba near St. Laurent, Manitoba, approximately 80 km (50 mi) northwest of Winnipeg, Manitoba, causing no damage.
- July 3 - an EF0 landspout tornado was confirmed near Otthon, Saskatchewan, 17 km (11 mi) southwest of Yorkton. No damage was reported.
- July 9 - three EF0 tornadoes touched down in Saskatchewan near the towns of Cantuar, Swift Current and Chaplin, causing no damage.
- July 10 - eight tornadoes were confirmed in southern Saskatchewan. All but two were given ratings of EF0 by Environment and Climate Change Canada (ECCC). The first occurred in the mid-afternoon, 15 km (9.3 mi) west of Golden Prairie. The next 2 touched down near Val Marie. An EF1 tornado then occurred near Ferland. As the storm system moved east, 2 tornadoes were confirmed southwest of Wood Mountain, one given an EF2 rating. The last two touched down near Fife Lake and Coronach.
- July 22 - a tornado was confirmed northeast of Langenburg, Saskatchewan, near the Manitoba provincial border. It uprooted several large trees.
- July 22 - a waterspout tornado was confirmed on Lake of the Prairies, near Roblin, Manitoba. No damage was reported.
- August 3 - an EF4 tornado with peak winds of 270–280 km/h touched down near Alonsa, Manitoba, approximately 210 km (130 mi) northwest of Winnipeg. It destroyed several homes, at least two cottages and several recreational trailers at the Margaret Bruce Beach Campground along an 800 metre wide path before dissipating over Lake Manitoba. Two people suffered minor injuries and one fatality was confirmed, the first tornado-related fatality in Canada since the 2011 Goderich tornado.
- August 27 - a high end EF0 tornado touched down north of Barrie, Ontario, tracking from Guthrie to Oro Station and possibly across Lake Simcoe before dissipating. It caused minimal damage to trees and buildings and snapped a 20 m (66 ft) communications tower in half along a 5 km (3.1 mi) path.
- August 29 - an EF2 tornado was confirmed in the Saint-Julien, Quebec, region, approximately 170 km (110 mi) northeast of Montreal. It uprooted many trees and one mobile home was completely destroyed.
- September 11 - A probable landspout tornado was reported near Nanton, Alberta.
- September 21 - Three tornadoes were confirmed in Eastern Ontario causing extensive damage. The first, an EF1, developed over Calabogie and tracked to White Lake. Several houses sustained roof damage and trees were snapped and uprooted. The second tornado touched down in the city of Ottawa and was given a high end EF3 rating. It developed 10 km (6.2 mi) west of Kinburn, tracked through Dunrobin, then crossed the Ottawa River into Breckenridge and continued through Gatineau, Quebec. It tossed cars, snapped trees and destroyed or severely damaged dozens of homes. The third tornado, an EF2, hit the Arlington Woods area of Ottawa, snapping hydro poles and damaging trees and buildings. All together at least 25 people were injured, 6 seriously. The EF3 tornado is only the second with that rating to touch down in Canada in September or later.
- September 21 - Environment and Climate Change Canada confirmed three EF1 tornadoes touched down in Quebec, associated with the tornado outbreak in Ontario the same day. The first touched down near the Val-des-Bois area, leaving a 13 km (8.1 mi) path of snapped trees and damaged buildings. The second occurred near the Baskatong Reservoir, about 30 km (19 mi) east of Mont-Laurier in a heavily wooded area. Satellite pictures showed damage to trees and power lines. The third tornado touched down 25 km (16 mi) north of Otter Lake leaving a 3 km (1.9 mi) path through woodlands.
- September 25 - Three tornadoes touched down in extreme Southwestern Ontario, near Windsor, after tornado warned storms swept through the region. Environment and Climate Change Canada (ECCC) confirmed a probable EF0 tornado hit first near Amherstburg where a brick welcome sign was blown over and large tree branches were snapped. There was no evidence of a long and narrow path of damage, but it was in line with the damage path of a tornado that occurred earlier that day in Michigan. The other two tornadoes were given EF1 ratings and touched down near the towns of McGregor and Staples. Both tornadoes caused roof and building damage and downed trees along a 3 km (1.9 mi) path that was approximately 50 metres wide. No injuries were reported.

2018 Confirmed Tornadoes: BC / AB / SK / MB / ON / QC / NB / TOTAL; 0 / 2 / 16 / 5 / 9 / 4 / 0 / 36	2018 Tornado Strengths: NR / EF0 / EF1 / EF2 / EF3 / EF4 / EF5; 7 / 18 / 6 / 3 / 1 / 1 / 0

=== 2019 ===
- April 24 – an EF0 landspout tornado was confirmed 7 km (4.3 mi) north of Peers, Alberta, damaging two sheds and a fence.
- May 3 – an EF0 landspout tornado was confirmed about 6 km (3.7 mi) southeast of Letellier, Manitoba, by Environment Canada. No damage was reported.
- June 2 – a probable EF1 landspout tornado hit the town of Fort Smith, Northwest Territories, damaging homes and snapping trees.
- June 2 – an EF1 tornado touched down in Orleans, Ontario, and traveled approximately 25 km (16 mi), dissipating northeast of Clarence Creek . Multiple trees were uprooted or snapped and many homes sustained roof damage. One person suffered minor injuries.
- June 13 - an EF0 tornado was confirmed 15 km (9 mi) southeast of Strathmore, Alberta.
- June 13 – a probable EF0 tornado touched down in Puslinch, Ontario, northwest of Hamilton, causing minor damage.
- June 14 – an EF0 tornado touched down near Seven Persons, Alberta causing no damage.
- June 23 – a brief tornado was observed 5 km (3.1 mi) north of Fort McLeod, Alberta and given an EF0 rating. No damage was reported.
- June 25 – an EF0 tornado was confirmed 2 km (1.2 mi) southwest of Sexsmith, Alberta, thanks to multiple photos and videos sent to the Prairie and Arctic Storm Prediction Centre. No damage was reported.
- June 26 – a brief EF0 landspout tornado touched down near Millet, Alberta causing no damage.
- June 28 – seven tornadoes were confirmed in Alberta; five EF0s and two EF1s. The five EF0s touched down 15 km (9.3 mi) north of Cold Lake, which then turned into a waterspout, 15 km (9.3 mi) east of Lac la Biche, the third 20 km (12 mi) southeast of Slave Lake, the fourth near Newbrook, and the fifth 23 km (14 mi) south of Hylo. The two EF1s touched down near Wolf Lake and Seibert Lake.
- June 28 – a probable tornado touched down 5 km (3.1 mi) west of Pierceland, Saskatchewan.
- June 29 – two tornadoes touched down in Meadow Lake Provincial Park in Saskatchewan, near Murray Doell Campground. An EF1 was confirmed approximately 15 km (9.3 mi) northwest of Goodsoil, Saskatchewan, and the other, an EF0, travelled just south of the campground. A camper trailer was turned over and many other trailers were damaged by fallen trees. Three people suffered minor injuries.
- June 29 - an EF0 tornado touched down near Grovedale, Alberta.
- July 1 – two tornadoes were confirmed in Saskatchewan after severe storms swept across the province. The first was spotted approximately 50 km (31 mi) south of Moose Jaw, and the second touched down 15 km (9.3 mi) northeast of Avonlea. Both tornadoes were given an EF0 rating.
- July 7 – a probable tornado touched down approximately 18 km (11 mi) west of Lomond, Alberta.
- July 7 – a probable tornado was reported near Mossbank, Saskatchewan.
- July 8 – an EF0 tornado was confirmed 75 km (47 mi) south of Grande Prairie, Alberta, causing no damage.
- July 11 - an EF0 tornado was confirmed near Pembroke, Ontario, snapping trees and causing minor property damage.
- July 12 - three EF0 tornadoes were confirmed in Saskatchewan after a round of stormy weather. The first touched down near Moose Jaw, then turned into a waterspout over Old Wives Lake. The other two tornadoes touched down northwest and south of the community of Rockglen. No damage or injuries were reported.
- July 13 - an EF0 tornado touched down near Northgate, Saskatchewan, causing no damage.
- July 14 - an EF0 tornado was confirmed approximately 2 km (1.2 mi) north of Crossfield, Alberta, destroying a holiday trailer.
- July 16 - an EF0 tornado touched down north of Oyen, Alberta.
- July 18 - an EF2 tornado touched down roughly 17 km (11 mi) east of Carmangay, Alberta, near Enchant, destroying a farm shed and causing property damage. No injuries were reported.
- July 18 - an EF0 landspout tornado was confirmed on Red Pheasant First Nation in Saskatchewan. No damage was reported.
- July 18 - an EF0 tornado was confirmed approximately 170 km (110 mi) west of Winnipeg, Manitoba, near the community of Camper. Two EF0 waterspouts were also confirmed over Dauphin Lake. No damage was reported.
- July 24 - Two tornadoes touched down in Alberta. The first was an EF0 tornado touched down near Waskatenau, Alberta, approximately 93 km (58 mi) northeast of Edmonton. No damage was reported. The second was an EF2 tornado near Hanmore Lake, destroying cabins, boats, and downing many trees.
- July 30 - Quebec saw its first tornado of the year as an EF1 touched down in Lac-aux-Sables, approximately 95 km (59 mi) northwest of Quebec City. It destroyed multiple camper trailers, snapped trees and damaged cottages. Three people suffered minor injuries.
- July 31 - an unconfirmed tornado was reported near Sylvan Lake, Alberta, approximately 24 km (15 mi) northwest of Red Deer.
- August 21 - An EF1 tornado was confirmed by the Northern Tornado Project in Lac-des-Écorces, Quebec, near Mont-Laurier The tornado happened around 10:30 P.M. and was first classified as a downburst, but further investigation found it was a tornado. Damages were mainly snapped trees, a ripped off roof, several damaged roofs (roof shingles), a lifted garage building, and 2 damaged mobile homes one of which was moved.
- Sept 2 - An EF0 tornado touched down near Griffin, Saskatchewan, causing no damage.
- Sept 11 - An EF1 tornado was confirmed near Petrolia, Ontario, damaging a barn, multiple sheds and snapping trees along a 5 km (3.1 mi) path. No injuries were reported.

2019 Confirmed Tornadoes: NT / BC / AB / SK / MB / ON / QC / NB / TOTAL; 1 / 0 / 22 / 12 / 4 / 4 / 2 / 0 / 44	2019 Tornado Strengths: NR / EF0 / EF1 / EF2 / EF3 / EF4 / EF5; 4 / 31 / 8 / 2 / 0 / 0 / 0

== 2020s ==
=== 2020 ===
- May 21 – an EF0 tornado was confirmed in North Saanich, British Columbia, on Vancouver Island. The tornado lifted a trampoline into the air; no other damage was reported.
- May 27 - an EF0 landspout tornado was confirmed near Mossleigh, Alberta. No damage was reported.
- May 31 - an EF0 tornado touched down near Beiseker, Alberta.
- June 8 - an EF2 tornado was confirmed near Brooks Lake, Ontario, northeast of Nestor Falls, causing extensive damage to a forest. The tornado cut a 31.7 km (19.7 mi) path through the forest reaching a maximum width of 2.4 km (1.5 mi), the widest tornado in Canadian history.
- June 10 - eleven tornadoes were confirmed across Ontario, with ten tornadoes, and Quebec, with one tornado, after powerful storms swept across the province. The strongest, an EF2, touched down near Mary Lake, Ontario, cutting a damage path of over 24 km (15 mi). Six EF1 tornadoes touched down in Ontario in Bracebridge, Belmont, Baysville, Mordolphin, Avon, Baysville and Lake Lavieille snapping trees and damaging structures. An EF1 tornado was also confirmed in a remote area near Lac Ava, Quebec. Three EF0 tornadoes were confirmed in Ontario in Belgrave, Brussels and Newbury, also damaging trees and farm buildings. No injuries were reported.
- June 13 - an EF0 tornado was confirmed near Barnwell, Alberta.
- June 19 - an EF0 tornado was confirmed near Staples, Ontario, causing no damage.
- June 23 - an EF0 landspout tornado was confirmed near Letellier, Manitoba.
- June 23 - an EF1 tornado was confirmed at Sturgeon Lake, Ontario, north of Lindsay. It destroyed a boathouse; no injuries were reported.
- June 24 - an EF0 tornado was confirmed north of Lac Saint-Jean, Quebec, uprooting trees and overturning a boat.
- June 28 - an EF2 tornado touched down southeast of Rapid City, Manitoba, snapping hundreds of trees, damaging barns and destroying two large drive sheds along a 5.6 km (3.5 mi) path. No injuries were reported.
- June 28 - an EF0 tornado was confirmed near Saint-Sébastien, Quebec, causing no damage.
- June 30 - an EF0 landspout tornado touched down near Kerwood, Ontario.
- July 1 - an EF0 tornado was confirmed near the community of Lone Pine, Alberta. No damage or injuries were reported.
- July 2 - an EF2 tornado was confirmed near Armit, Saskatchewan before crossing into Manitoba and causing EF1-strength tree damage southwest of Muskeg Lakes, Manitoba. This tornado was one continuous tornado but is recorded as an individual EF2 tornado in Saskatchewan and an individual EF1 tornado in Manitoba per Canadian records.
- July 4 - three tornadoes touched down in southern Saskatchewan. The first, an EF0, happened near Glenbain with no damage reported. The second, an EF1, touched down near Meyronne, staying on the ground for 40 minutes and destroying a garage, and damaging vehicles and a boat. The third, rated an EF0, was confirmed near Assiniboia, causing no damage.
- July 7 - five EF0 tornadoes were confirmed across southeastern Alberta, causing no damage. They occurred east of Keoma, west of Acme, west of Trochu, a few kilometers north of Brooks and south of Red Deer.
- July 7 - an EF2 tornado was confirmed in a forested area near Lac Olga, Quebec.
- July 10 - an EF0 tornado was confirmed near Milton, Ontario.
- July 11 - an EF0 tornado was confirmed over Lake Nipissing, Ontario
- July 12 - an EF1 tornado touched down near Nanton, Alberta, damaging a farm.
- July 13 - an EF2 tornado touched down near Stout Lake, Ontario, leaving a 13.4 km (8.3 mi) damage path.
- July 16 - an EF0 tornado was confirmed near Brantford, Ontario. No damage was reported.
- July 16 - an EF0 tornado was confirmed near Manawan, Quebec, causing no damage.
- July 17 - an EF0 tornado was confirmed near Kenville, Manitoba, causing no damage.
- July 19 - twelve tornadoes were confirmed in southwestern Ontario and parts of Quebec after storms swept the region. In the morning, a line of severe storms swept through Southern Ontario leaving a trail of destruction from nine tornadoes and several downbursts. Of the nine tornadoes, six were given EF1 ratings and caused damage to multiple farms and homes, crops, and trees. They were confirmed north Lucan, in Beachville, near Blyth, near Gads Hill, near Thedford and near Eden Mills. The three others were given EF0 ratings and touched down in Belmont, near St. Columban and along the Lambton Shores near Kettle Point. A waterspout was also confirmed on Lake Huron. In the afternoon, a second round of storms cross Ontario and Quebec, producing three tornadoes in Quebec. The first was an EF2 tornado in Saint-Vital-de-Clermont, causing tree damage. The second was an EF1 tornado near Lac Turgeon, causing minor tree damage. The third was another EF2 tornado near Lac Grosbois.
- July 23 - an EF0 tornado was confirmed near Sainte-Sabine-de-Bellechasse, Quebec. No damage was reported.
- July 25 - an EF2 tornado was confirmed in a heavily forested area near Dodds Lake, Ontario, northeast of Cochrane.
- July 27 - two tornadoes were confirmed in southern Quebec. An EF1 tornado touched down near Saint-Mathias-de-Bonneterre, approximately 200 km (120 mi) southeast of Montreal. It causing significant damage to homes, trees and a baseball diamond. A second tornado was captured by witnesses near Saint-Roch-de-Mékinac, 77 km (48 mi) north of Trois-Rivières. No damage was reported and it has been given a default rating of EF0.
- August 2 - four tornadoes were confirmed in Ontario. The first, an EF0, touched down in Camden East. It snapped trees and hydro poles and ripped off roofs. The second, an EF1, touched down near Bexley, in a forested area. The third, a low-end EF0, touched down near Oxford Mills, southwest of Kemptville, causing no damage. The fourth, an EF2, hit near Kinmount, north of Peterborough. It snapped trees and damaged a church and cemetery.
- August 3 - an EF0 tornado was confirmed near Youngstown, Alberta. No damage was reported.
- August 4 - an EF0 tornado was confirmed near Estevan, Saskatchewan, causing no damage.
- August 4 - an EF0 tornado touched down north of Palmerston, Ontario, causing minor damage.
- August 7 - an EF3 tornado was confirmed near Scarth, Manitoba, 16 km (9.9 mi) south of Virden. It damaged a farm and threw vehicles into the air, killing two people and seriously injuring another.
- August 13 - an EF0 tornado was confirmed near Alexander, Manitoba, causing no damage.
- August 14 - two tornadoes touched down in Northwestern Ontario in remote areas. An EF1 caused tree damage near French Lake in Quetico Provincial Park. An EF2 caused significant tree damage near Smoothrock Lake.
- August 16 - an EF0 landspout tornado was confirmed in Kent Bridge, Ontario, causing no damage.
- August 21 - an EF0 tornado was confirmed in Fort St. John, British Columbia, damaging homes and fences. No injuries were reported.
- August 21 - two EF0 landspout tornadoes were confirmed in Saskatchewan, near Fulda, and north of Humboldt, causing no damage.
- August 21 - two EF0 tornadoes was confirmed in Manitoba. The first tornado touched down near Shoal Lake and caused some crop damage. The second EF0 tornado touched down near Tuckers Lake.
- August 24 - a rare EF0 waterspout was confirmed over Bay St. George, Newfoundland And Labrador thanks to eyewitness photos.
- August 27 - two EF1 tornadoes touched down in Southwestern Ontario, damaging barns and snapping trees. They were confirmed near Union and Mount Carmel. No injuries were reported.
- August 28 - an EF0 tornado was confirmed in Point Clark, Ontario, snapping trees and damaging homes. No injuries were reported.
- September 3 - two tornadoes were confirmed in Ontario. An EF1 tornado touched down near Washago, snapping trees and damaging cottages. The second, an EF0 tornado, hit the east side of Port Colborne, leaving a 1 km (0.62 mi) path of damage.
- September 13 - an EF1 tornado touched down south of Pembroke, Ontario, causing damage to trees and homes along a 9.5 km (5.9 mi) path leading to Demers, Quebec. This tornado was one continuous tornado but is recorded as an individual EF1 tornado in Ontario and an individual EF0 tornado in Quebec per Canadian records.
- September 28 - an EF1 tornado was confirmed north of Lac des Aulnes, Quebec in the Portneuf Regional County Municipality, causing tree damage.
- September 30 - an EF1 tornado was confirmed north of Hamilton, Ontario, causing significant damage to a farm. No injuries were reported.
- October 23 - an EF0 tornado was confirmed in Thornbury, Ontario, damaging trees and power poles.
- November 15 - An EF1 tornado was confirmed in Georgetown, Ontario, uprooting trees and damaging homes. No injuries were reported.

2020 Confirmed Tornadoes: BC / AB / SK / MB / ON / QC / NL / TOTAL; 2 / 11 / 7 / 7 / 45 / 13 / 1 / 84	2020 Tornado Strengths: EF0 / EF1 / EF2 / EF3 / EF4 / EF5; 45 / 29 / 11 / 1 / 0 / 0

=== 2021 ===
- May 12 - an EF0 landspout tornado was confirmed approximately 10 km (6.2 mi) northwest of Saskatoon, Saskatchewan. No damage was reported.
- May 14 - two EF0 landspout tornadoes were confirmed by eyewitness video near Friedensruh, Manitoba and Roblin, Manitoba. No damage was reported.
- May 15 - an EF0 landspout tornado was confirmed near Sandy Bay, Manitoba, thanks to eyewitness photos, causing no damage.
- May 15 - an EF0 tornado was confirmed near Saint-Méthode-de-Frontenac, Quebec.
- May 25 - five tornadoes touched down in Northeastern Ontario and Quebec from the same parent storm. The storm first produced an EF2 tornado was confirmed in a heavily wooded area near Little Antler Lake, Ontario, southwest of Chapleau. Afterwards, the storm produced an EF1 tornado north of Gogama, causing tree damage. After crossing into Quebec, the tornado produced three EF2 tornadoes west of Val-d'Or, Quebec. They all touched down in heavily wooded areas near Petit lac Bull Rock, Lac des Deux Cantons and Lac-Simon.
- June 5 - two EF0 tornadoes were confirmed in Alberta; one near Longview, and the other near Blackie. No damage was reported.
- June 6 - an EF0 landspout tornado was confirmed near Joffre, Alberta.
- June 6 - two tornadoes touched down in Northwestern Ontario causing tree damage. An EF1 touched down near Fernlund Lake while an EF2 touched down near Chipchase Lake, southwest of Fort Hope.
- June 9 - an EF0 tornado was confirmed in Altona, Manitoba, damaging trees and a trailer.
- June 11 - an EF0 landspout tornado was confirmed in Thorndale, Ontario, causing no damage.
- June 15 - three EF0 tornadoes were confirmed in central Saskatchewan, near D'Arcy, Fiske and McGee, damaging grain bins, trees and crops.
- June 21 - six tornadoes were confirmed in southern Quebec. The strongest, an EF2, hit the community of Mascouche, approximately 40 km (25 mi) northeast of Montreal, damaging between 75 and 100 homes, uprooting trees, and killing one person. An EF1 touched down near Saint-Narcisse-de-Beaurivage, south of Quebec City. Four EF0 tornadoes were also confirmed, touching down near Saint-Valentin, Saint-Célestin, Saint-Elzéar and Sainte-Marie.
- June 23 - an EF1 tornado touched down in a remote forested area east of Sioux Lookout, Ontario near Nog Lake.
- June 26 - three tornadoes were confirmed in Southern Ontario, including an EF2, which touched down north of Chatsworth. It damaged several homes, downed trees and destroyed a barn. An EF1 also touched down north of Maynooth, snapping hydro poles and trees. The third, an EF0, occurred north of Goderich, causing no damage. No injuries were reported.
- June 30 - an EF1 tornado touched down near Stewiacke, Nova Scotia, destroying a barn and snapping trees.
- July 22 - an EF0 tornado touched down near Antrim, Nova Scotia.
- July 13 - five tornadoes were confirmed in Ontario and Quebec after a line of severe thunderstorms moved through the region. The first tornado, an EF0, touched down in Penetanguishene, Ontario, damaging trees and power lines along a 2.5 km (1.6 mi) path. The second tornado, an EF2, touched down near Beachburg, Ontario causing extensive tree damage before crossing the Ottawa River and causing EF1 damage in Quebec before lifting near Rivière-Barry. This tornado was one continuous tornado but is recorded as an individual EF2 tornado in Ontario and an individual EF1 tornado in Quebec per Canadian records. While this tornado was on the ground, a concurrent EF1 tornado caused tree damage on Butternut Island, Ontario, near Beachburg, Ontario. Two additional EF1 tornadoes were confirmed in Quebec near Fieldville and Notre-Dame-du-Laus.
- July 15 - fifteen tornadoes touched down across Southern Ontario and Western Quebec. The first tornado, an EF2, struck Barrie, Ontario damaging at least 470 homes and injuring 11 people. The initial tornado lifted over Lake Simcoe and the parent thunderstorm produced a second EF2 tornado on the east side of the lake near Beaverton, Ontario crossing through Lorneville, Ontario where there was significant structural and tree damage. Three additional tornadoes formed from another supercell to the south of Lake Simcoe; first as an EF2 stretching from Brown Hill, Ontario to Udora, Ontario before picking up before picking up and dropping an EF1 from Vallentyne, Ontario through to Sunderland, Ontario before picking up one final time and dropping another EF2 tornado from Sonya, Ontario through to Salem Corners, Ontario; 1 person was injured. Later in the afternoon, three additional EF2 tornadoes touched down through Central Ontario near Dwight, Ontario and two lakes in Algonquin Park: Sunbeam Lake and Lake Traverse. Three EF1 tornadoes touched down along the Ottawa River near Lac Mélina, Quebec, Petawawa, Ontario and Sheenboro, Quebec. The final four tornadoes occurred in remote areas of Quebec. Two of the tornadoes were EF1 rated and touched down near Lac Sar and Lac Tonin. The final two tornado were both EF2 rated and touched down near Lac Camachigama and Lac Bellefleur.
- July 20 - an EF0 tornado was confirmed on Whitestone Lake, Ontario, south of Dunchurch, damaging trees and cottages.
- July 22 - an EF2 tornado touched down near Deschambault Lake, Saskatchewan.
- July 22 - an EF0 tornado touched down near Antrim, Nova Scotia, in the Musquodoboit Valley, causing no damage.
- July 24 - four tornadoes were confirmed in Southwestern Ontario. Three were given an EF0 rating, and touched down near Thornbury, Bayfield, and Windsor, causing minor tree and structural damage. The fourth, an EF1, damaged trees and a greenhouse near Leamington.
- August 6 - an EF1 tornado was confirmed in a remote forest near Hathaway Lake, Saskatchewan, north of Pierceland.
- August 10 - three tornadoes were confirmed in Northwestern Ontario thanks to satellite imagery. The first tornado, an EF1, touched down near Marugg Lake, southeast of Sandy Lake. The second tornado, an EF1, touched down near Menako Lakes, north of Pickle Lake. The third tornado, an EF2, touched down near Whitewater Lake, north of Armstrong.
- August 10 - an EF0 tornado was confirmed east of London, Ontario, near the airport.
- August 11 - six tornadoes were confirmed in Northeastern Ontario. Three EF1's touched down near Urquhart Lake, Campover Lake and Dunns Valley. Three EF2's touched down near Blinko Lake, Kynoch and Elliot Lake. Satellite imagery helped confirm the tornadoes, which all occurred in heavily treed areas. Several downbursts were also confirmed.
- August 15 - three EF1 tornadoes were confirmed in Northern Alberta, south of High Level. The tornadoes touched down in remote areas near Chain Ponds and Buffalo Head Prairie. The tornadoes caused tree damage.
- August 20 - three tornadoes were confirmed in Manitoba in remote areas, east of Pinawa. The first tornado, an EF2, touched down near Betula Lake. The second tornado, an EF1, touched down near Bryan Lake. The third tornado, also an EF1, touched down near Westergaard Lake in Nopiming Provincial Park.
- August 23 - three tornadoes were confirmed in Saskatchewan. The first tornado, an EF0, touched down near Glenbain, causing no damage before it dissipated. The same parent storm developed a second tornado, an EF2, also near Glenbain. The EF2 caused severe damage to farm properties as it tracked 10.7 km (6.6 mi) to an area south of Hodgeville. The third tornado, an EF0, touched down east of Kindersley, causing no damage.
- August 24 - an EF0 tornado was confirmed east of Ituna, Saskatchewan, causing no damage.
- August 26 - an EF0 tornado was confirmed near McKay's Corners, Ontario, east of Chatham, causing no damage.
- August 29 - seven tornadoes touched down across Northeastern Ontario, with four tornadoes, and Northern Quebec, with three tornadoes. The first tornado, an EF1, was confirmed in Dowling, Ontario, northwest of Sudbury, damaging trees and buildings. The second tornado caused EF1-strength tree damage near Aubrey Lake, Ontario. The third tornado caused EF1-strength tree damage near Pledger Lake, Ontario, north of Hearst. The fourth tornado was an EF2 tornado in a remote area near Wakimika Lake, Ontario, west of Temagami. The fifth and sixth tornadoes, both EF1s, touched down near Lake Turgeon, Quebec and near Lac Patrie, Quebec, both northwest of Amos. The seventh tornado was an EF2 and caused significant tree damage over Lac Mandjoci, Quebec, southwest of Matagami.
- August 31 - an EF2 tornado caused tree damage in a remote area northeast of Beauval, Saskatchewan near Lac la Plonge.
- September 6 - an early morning EF0 tornado was confirmed in Port Albert, Ontario, damaging trees.
- September 7 - six tornadoes were confirmed after severe thunderstorms tore through southern Ontario. The strongest, a multi-vortex hybrid supercell-QLCS with an EF2 rating, caused significant damage over a 19.2 km (11.9 mi) path from Kingsbridge to an area just south of Lucknow with a maximum width of 1.3 km (0.81 mi). The same storm went on to produce a second EF2 tornado through northern Wellington County across a 26.5 km (16.5 mi) long path from Harriston to Kenilworth. The remaining four tornadoes, all rated EF0s, touched down near Goderich, Monkton, Kuhryville and Vaughan. Multiple waterspouts were also reported over Lake Huron near Port Albert, Kingsbridge and Amberley.
- September 8 - two EF0 tornadoes were confirmed in Southern Ontario. The first tornado started as a waterspout over Lake Ontario and moved on shore in Kingston causing no damage. The second tornado started as a waterspout over Georgian Bay and moved on shore causing weak tree damage on Delhaven Island, southwest of the Parry Sound area.
- September 12 - an EF1 tornado was confirmed near Parkhill, Ontario, causing tree and structural damage.
- September 15 - an EF1 tornado was confirmed near Strachan, Alberta, causing tree damage in a remote area.
- October 10 - two tornadoes touched down in Northwestern Ontario. The first tornado, rated an EF2, was confirmed in a remote area near Bending Lake, southeast of Dryden, causing tree damage. The second tornado touched down near Alder Lake, Minnesota and moved northward across the Canada–United States border near Mountain Lake. The tornado caused EF2 tree damage in Minnesota and EF1 tree damage in Ontario. The tornado is recorded as an EF1 tornado in Canadian records.
- October 16 - two EF0 tornadoes were confirmed in southern Quebec. The first tornado touched down near Sainte-Seraphine, causing tree and structural damage. The second tornado happened near Cowansville, also causing tree and structural damage. No injuries were reported.
- October 17 - an EF0 waterspout was confirmed over Lake Huron, west of Goderich, Ontario.
- November 6 - an EF0 tornado formed over the Strait of Georgia, west of Vancouver, British Columbia. Beginning as a waterspout, it came ashore and caused significant tree damage at the golf club on the University of British Columbia campus. Heavy rain and hail also accompanied the storm. No injuries were reported.
- November 21 - an EF0 tornado was confirmed near Sharon, Ontario, northeast of Newmarket, damaging trees.

2021 Confirmed Tornadoes: BC / AB / SK / MB / ON / QC / NS / TOTAL; 1 / 7 / 11 / 7 / 54 / 24 / 2 / 105	2021 Tornado Strengths: EF0 / EF1 / EF2 / EF3 / EF4 / EF5; 40 / 36 / 30 / 0 / 0 / 0

=== 2022 ===
- May 15 - an EF0 landspout tornado was confirmed south of Casselman, Ontario, southeast of Ottawa, causing no damage.
- May 17 - an EF0 landspout tornado touched down near Caron, Saskatchewan, approximately 100 km (62 mi) west of Regina.
- May 21 - four tornadoes were confirmed across Ontario after a powerful derecho swept across the province. Two EF1 tornadoes touched down in London on the leading edge of the storm, damaging buildings, snapping trees and flipping a plane at the London International Airport. An EF2 was also confirmed in Uxbridge, northwest of Oshawa, causing extensive damage along a 16 km (9.9 mi) path. A second EF2 tornado was confirmed in St. Christopher in the Township of Scugog, northeast of Oshawa, damaging barns and rural properties along an 8.5 km (5.3 mi) path.
- May 30 - five tornadoes touched down in Northwestern Ontario, including an EF2 tornado near Boffin Lake, approximately 15 km (9.3 mi) north of Fort Frances. A second EF2 was confirmed at Kaoskauta Lake, southwest of Dryden, and three EF1's touched down near Crozier, Black Narrows and Harnette Lake, causing mostly tree damage.
- May 31 - two tornadoes were confirmed based on satellite imagery in Northern Ontario. An EF2 touched down near Attawapiskat Lake, east of Lansdowne House and an EF1 was confirmed south of Webequie.
- June 6 - an EF1 tornado touched down near Enchant, Alberta, damaging grain bins and a shed. No injuries were reported.
- June 10 - two EF0 tornadoes were confirmed in Saskatchewan; northeast Furness, and east of Maymont, 90 km (56 mi) northwest of Saskatoon, thanks to witness video. No damage was reported.
- June 16 - eight tornadoes struck Ontario and Quebec. Two EF0 tornadoes were confirmed in Ontario near Brooklin, north of Whitby, causing tree damage and destroying a small wooden structure. The second touched down near Carleton Place, causing no damage. Six tornadoes were confirmed in Quebec. Two EF2 tornadoes touched down near Lac Johnson and Lac Betty, while four EF1 tornadoes were confirmed near Lac aux Eaux Mortes, McCarthy, Casey, and Lac Usik.
- June 20 - an EF0 tornado was confirmed near Rheinfeld, Saskatchewan, approximately 245 km (152 mi) southwest of Regina. No damage was reported.
- June 23 - an EF0 tornado was confirmed near Morse, Saskatchewan, approximately 57 km (35 mi) east of Swift Current. No damage was reported.
- June 25 - an EF0 waterspout was confirmed on Lake St. Martin, Manitoba.
- June 29 - an EF0 tornado was confirmed in an open field south of Coronation, Alberta, causing no damage.
- June 29 - seven tornadoes were confirmed in Saskatchewan, including an EF2, which touched down west of Manitou Beach, causing tree damage. An EF1 was also confirmed west of Foam Lake, damaging farm equipment and grain bins. Two EF1 tornadoes on separate tracks touched down near Cymric, also damaging farm properties and grain bins. Two twin tornadoes were also confirmed southwest of Serath, damaging two farms and crops. They were given EF1 and EF0 ratings, respectively. An EF0 tornado was also confirmed near Arbury, causing crop damage.
- June 29 - an EF2 tornado touched down in Duck Mountain Provincial Park, south of Kenville, Manitoba.
- July 1 - an EF1 tornado was confirmed near Lac Quenouille, Quebec, 120 km (75 mi) north of Montreal, causing tree damage.
- July 5 - five EF0 tornadoes were confirmed in Alberta and Saskatchewan. The three tornadoes occurred in Alberta near Alliance, Consort, and Neutral Hills. No damage was reported. The last two EF0 tornadoes were confirmed in Saskatchewan, near Madison, and Smiley, northwest of Swift Current.
- July 7 - an EF2 tornado was confirmed in Bergen, Alberta, approximately 81 km (50 mi) southwest of Red Deer, snapping trees, power poles, destroying one home and damaging 4 others.
- July 8 - four tornadoes were confirmed in Central Saskatchewan, including two EF2s. They touched down in Paynton and Blaine Lake, causing damage to trees and a farm. Two EF0 tornadoes also hit near Lambert Lake and Oliver Lake, causing no damage.
- July 9 - an EF0 tornado was confirmed near Argyle, Manitoba, causing no damage.
- July 10 - an EF0 waterspout was confirmed over the English River, on the One Man Lake Reserve (Wabaseemoong Independent Nations), thanks to witness video. No damage was reported.
- July 15 - three EF0 tornadoes were confirmed in Saskatchewan, near Allan, Young and Avonhurst, causing crop and tree damage.
- July 17 - an EF0 tornado touched down near Radville, Saskatchewan, 110 km (68 mi) south of Regina, causing no damage.
- July 18 - an EF2 tornado touched down just west of Medicine Hat, Alberta, damaging at least ten homes, grain bins, downing powerlines, and snapping trees.
- July 18 - an EF2 tornado touched down northeast of Timmins, Ontario, near Gowanmarsh Lake.
- July 19 - an EF0 tornado was confirmed in Wyoming, Ontario, damaging a machine shed.
- July 20 - eleven tornadoes were confirmed in heavily forested areas of western Quebec and Northeastern Ontario, thanks to satellite imagery. An EF2 tornado was confirmed north of Sudbury, Ontario near Kalaco Lake. The remaining ten tornadoes were confirmed in Quebec. Four of these tornadoes were rated EF2 and confirmed near Lac Plantin, Lac Pedro, La Vallée-de-l'Or and Lac Antiquois. The remaining six tornadoes, rated EF1, touched down near Lac des Deux Iles, Lac Landerneau, Lac Stone Island, Lac Langford, Lac Tona and Lac Cade.
- July 21 - five tornadoes touched down in rural parts of Quebec and New Brunswick. Three of the tornadoes, rated EF1, all occurred in Quebec, near Saint-André-du-Lac-Saint-Jean, Lac Maher and Lac des Ventres Rouges. The remaining tornadoes, both EF2s, occurred near Lac-Saint-Joseph, Quebec and Wild Goose Lake, New Brunswick. No injuries were reported. Tree damage was detected thanks to satellite imagery
- July 23 - three tornadoes touched down in the municipality of Saint-Adolphe-d'Howard, Quebec, in the Laurentians. The first was an EF2 tornado which damaged homes and uprooted trees. Two satellite tornadoes were also confirmed, which affected areas adjacent to the main tornadic flow. An EF0 was confirmed near Chemin du Village, and an EF1 touched down west of Saint-Joseph Lake.
- July 24 - three tornadoes touched down in the Ottawa Valley. The strongest was an EF2 tornado which left a 55 km (34 mi) path of damage through central Ontario, hitting the communities of Havelock, Marmora, Madoc, Actinolite and Tweed. It destroyed homes, barns and cottages, uprooted trees and downed power lines. At least one person was injured when their truck was lifted, and thrown into a field. A weaker, EF1 tornado was also confirmed southwest of Parham from the same parent storm, causing minor damage. A third tornado touched down in rural Quebec in a heavily forested area near Lac du Bec-Scie, Quebec.
- July 25 - an EF0 waterspout was confirmed over Lake Athabasca in northern Saskatchewan, causing no damage.
- July 28 - an EF1 tornado was confirmed in Algonquin Park, Ontario, leaving a 11.7 km (7.3 mi) path through a forested area near Wapiti Lake.
- July 31 - an EF0 tornado touched down 5 km (3.1 mi) southwest of Coronation, Alberta, causing no damage.
- July 31 - an EF1 tornado touched down near Ken Lake, British Columbia in a heavily forested area.
- August 1 - an EF0 tornado was confirmed near Cranbrook, Ontario, causing a narrow path of damage to trees and crops.
- August 2 - an EF0 tornado was confirmed near Netley, Manitoba, causing no damage.
- August 2/3 - seven tornadoes touched down in Northwestern Ontario in the late evening and overnight, with six developing after a bow echo storm overtook a weak supercell near Grassy Narrows. Three EF2 tornadoes and four EF1 tornadoes were confirmed near Campfire Lake, Conifer Lake, Sumach Lake, Overnight Lake and Virginian Lake. All tornadoes occurred in forested areas.
- August 3 - an EF0 tornado was confirmed in Shallow Lake, Ontario, northwest of Owen Sound, causing no damage.
- August 4 - two tornadoes were confirmed in Saskatchewan; an EF0 near Witchekan Lake First Nation, 90 km (56 mi) northeast of North Battleford, causing no damage, and an EF2 near Erinferry, causing tree and power pole damage.
- August 8 - an EF0 touched down in Winchelsea, Ontario, approximately 40 km (25 mi) north of London, causing tree and crop damage, and tossing a resident 10 metres (33 ft). No serious injuries were reported.
- August 8 - two EF1 tornadoes touched down across heavily forested areas in Northern Saskatchewan and Northern Manitoba. The first tornado crossed through Tryer Lakes, Saskatchewan. The second tornado touched down near Apussigamasi Lake, Manitoba, northeast of Thompson.
- August 11 - an EF0 tornado was confirmed thanks to witness video in Saint-Elzéar-de-Témiscouata, Quebec, causing no damage.
- August 18 - an EF0 tornado touched down east of Beausejour, Manitoba, and witness photos helped to confirm another EF0 tornado over Lake Manitoba. No damage was reported in either event.
- August 20 - a review of satellite imagery revealed three tornadoes touched down in Northern Ontario; an EF1 near Iroquois Falls, in a forested area, and an EF1 and EF2 near Gooseberry Lake.
- August 25 - a weak EF0 tornado was confirmed near Darbyville, Ontario, east of Guelph, causing no damage.
- August 29 - an EF0 tornado was confirmed in Payne, Ontario, 16 km (9.9 mi) south of Sarnia, damaging trees and barns.
- August 30 - an EF0 tornado touched down in Hastings, Ontario, causing tree damage.
- August 31 - an EF0 waterspout formed over Lake Huron, and then made landfall through Sauble Beach, Ontario, damaging trees, boats and docks along a narrow 5 km (3.1 mi) path.
- August 31 - an EF0 tornado touched down in Stapledon, Ontario, southwest of Ottawa causing tree damage.
- August 31 - three tornadoes touched down in the Saguenay–Lac-Saint-Jean region of Quebec. The first tornado was a weak EF0 tornado near Chicoutimi, causing no damage. The remaining two tornadoes, both EF1s, occurred near Deuxième lac Félix in a heavily forested area.
- September 1 - an EF1 tornado was confirmed in a heavily forested area near Lasthope Lake, Manitoba, southeast of Lynn Lake.
- September 20 - five tornadoes were confirmed in Northwestern Ontario. An EF2 tornado was confirmed thanks to satellite imagery, southeast of Pickle Lake, in a heavily wooded area, leaving a 42.4 km (26.3 mi) path. A second EF2 was also confirmed near Dusey Lake, southwest of Ogoki, and three EF1 tornadoes touched down near Winslow Lake, Calladine Lake and Quantz Lake all causing tree damage in forested areas.
- September 26 - an EF0 tornado was confirmed in Wellington, Ontario after a waterspout moved on shore flipping two trailers. Additional waterspouts were confirmed near the shores of Lake Ontario and Lake Erie as part of a Great Lakes-wide waterspout outbreak.
- October 24 - an EF1 tornado was confirmed in a remote area near Young Lake, Ontario, north of Kenora.
- November 5/6 - three tornadoes occurred overnight in rural Quebec, all damaging trees. The first, an EF2, touched down near Angliers, Quebec. The remaining two tornadoes, both EF1s, occurred in the early morning on November 6 near Lac Parent and Lac de la Paroi.

2022 Confirmed Tornadoes: BC / AB / SK / MB / ON / QC / NB / TOTAL; 1 / 8 / 26 / 8 / 46 / 32 / 1 / 122	2022 Tornado Strengths: EF0 / EF1 / EF2 / EF3 / EF4 / EF5; 44 / 47 / 31 / 0 / 0 / 0

=== 2023 ===
- May 11 - an EF0 landspout tornado was confirmed near Cayley, Alberta, causing no damage.
- May 23 - an EF1 tornado touched down near Lawrence Lake, Alberta, east of Hondo, in a forested area.
- May 27 - an EF1 tornado was confirmed 11 km (6.8 mi) southeast of Regina, Saskatchewan, near Rowatt, damaging a farm storage shed and throwing debris up to 3 km (1.9 mi) away.
- May 31 - an EF0 landspout tornado was confirmed northeast of Stettler, Alberta, near Botha, causing no damage.
- June 4 - an EF0 landspout tornado touched down near Carberry, Manitoba, causing no damage.
- June 11 - an EF0 landspout tornado was confirmed near Lomond, Alberta, causing no damage.
- June 13 - two EF0 tornadoes touched down in Southern Ontario; the first, near Talbotville, approximately 20 km (12 mi) south of London, causing minor damage, and the second near Beachville, southwest of Woodstock, causing no damage.
- June 14 - ten tornadoes, all with a preliminary rating of EF0, were confirmed in southern Alberta as part of a tornado outbreak. Three were confirmed near Turin, two outside of Enchant, and the other five near Iron Springs, Lake Newell, Brooks, Vermilion, and Cabin Lake. No damage was reported.
- June 17 - an EF0 tornado was confirmed near Whitla, Alberta, southwest of Medicine Hat, causing no damage. An EF1 tornado was also confirmed by satellite imagery in a forested area near McGregor Lake, northeast of Nordegg.
- June 20 - three EF1 tornadoes touched down in Southern Manitoba, near William Lake Provincial Park, Killarney, and MacGregor, damaging farm buildings and snapping multiple trees.
- June 25 - two EF0 tornadoes were confirmed in Windsor, Ontario, causing tree and structural damage.
- June 26 - six tornadoes were confirmed in Central Ontario following a round of severe storms. The first, an EF0, touched down in Stayner, approximately 30 km (19 mi) northwest of Barrie, causing minor damage. Three EF0 tornadoes were then confirmed in Tweed, 38 km (24 mi) northeast of Belleville, causing two narrow paths of tree damage around Stoco Lake and Elzevir. Two EF1 tornadoes were also confirmed by satellite imagery near Actinolite and Potter Settlement in heavily treed areas. No injuries were reported.
- June 27 - an EF0 tornado touched down near Keyes, Manitoba, 66 km (41 mi) northwest of Portage la Prairie, causing no damage.
- June 28 - two EF0 tornadoes were confirmed in Southern Manitoba, near Venlaw and Brookdale. No damage was reported.
- July 1 - a large, EF4 tornado touched down south of Didsbury, Alberta, destroying three homes and damaging nine others, along a 15.3 km (9.5 mi) path. One person was injured. It was the strongest recorded tornado in Alberta since the 1987 F4 Edmonton tornado.
- July 4 - an EF0 tornado was confirmed in Hamilton, Ontario, causing minor damage along a narrow path.
- July 6 - two tornadoes touched down in forested areas in Northeastern Ontario and Northern Québec. Satellite imagery revealed an EF1 tornado touched down near Pineview Lake, Ontario, west of Temagami, Ontario. The second tornado, also an EF1, touched down in a forested area near Lac Sunrise, Quebec, approximately 58 km (36 mi) west of Chibougamau.
- July 9 - four tornadoes were confirmed in Northwestern Ontario, including an EF2 which touched down near the remote community of Hine Lake, Ontario, causing tree damage along a 12 km (7.5 mi) path. The other three, all rated EF1, occurred near Landings Lake, Rude Lake and Pakashkan Lake through forested areas.
- July 13 - seven tornadoes touched down in the Ottawa Valley after a line of severe storms swept through the National Capital Region. The first two tornadoes were rated as EF1 tornadoes and struck the suburbs of Ottawa, Ontario, near Barrhaven, Ontario. The main path of damage extended approximately 5 km (3.1 mi), with a shorter 1 km (0.62 mi) path crossing it, caused by the first tornado. At least 125 homes suffered damage, and one person received minor injuries after being struck by debris. A third tornado, an EF0, hit the small community of Embrun, Ontario, 35 km (22 mi) southeast of Ottawa, causing minor damage to several homes. The fourth tornado, also an EF0, hit near Fournier, Ontario, causing tree and crop damage. After the storms moves into Quebec, an EF0, touched down in a field near the Montréal–Mirabel International Airport, 39 km (24 mi) northwest of Montréal. The sixth tornado, also an EF0, occurred near Saint-Thomas, approximately 58 km (36 mi) northeast of Montréal, causing damage to trees, two barns and one home along a 6.6 km (4.1 mi) path. No injuries were reported. The seventh, an EF1, touched down near Laurence, north of Saint-Roch-de-l'Achigan, through cropland and forested areas. No damage was reported.
- July 17 - an EF0 landspout tornado was confirmed near Okotoks, Alberta, thanks to witness photos and video.
- July 18 - an EF1 tornado touched down near Brompton, Quebec, damaging crops and a barn.
- July 20 - two tornadoes were confirmed in Southwestern Ontario, including an EF1, which damaged a home and trees along a 10.5 km (6.5 mi) path from South Buxton to Lake Erie. The second, an EF0, damaged crops, a power pole, trees and a barn east of Petrolia. No injuries were reported. An EF0 tornado was also confirmed over Lake Nippising, near North Bay, causing no damage.
- July 24 - an EF0 tornado was confirmed near of Cynthia, Alberta, approximately 115 km (71 mi) west of Edmonton. Minor tree damage was reported.
- July 26 - an EF2 tornado was confirmed near Ranger Lakes, Manitoba, approximately 169 km (105 mi) north of Winnipeg. The tornado was found in a remote forest.
- July 26 - an EF1 tornado touched down in Blenheim, Ontario, 20 km (12 mi) southeast of Chatham, damaging homes, sheds and trees. No Injuries were reported.
- July 27 - an EF1 tornado touched down near McParlon Lake, Ontario, in a partially treed area.
- July 28 - an EF0 tornado was confirmed in Inverness, Quebec, 50 km (31 mi) southwest of Quebec City, thanks to witness video. The tornado damaged a barn and resulted in isolated tree damage.
- August 3 - five tornadoes touched down across the Ottawa Valley. Three of the tornadoes caused tree damage in remote parts of the forest in Quebec with two EF2 tornadoes near Lac Kent, Quebec and Lac Marcel, Quebec, northwest of La Tuque, Quebec. The third tornado was an EF1 tornado near Lac Los, Quebec in the Antoine-Labelle Regional County Municipality. The last two tornadoes, both rated EF0, took place in Ontario. The first tornado was confirmed in rural south Ottawa, Ontario, 9 km (5.6 mi) northwest of Metcalfe, causing damage to businesses and homes. A second EF0 tornado also touched down northeast of Kaladar, causing no damage.
- August 12 - an EF0 tornado touched down northeast of Caledonia, Ontario, causing tree damage. A second EF0 tornado was recorded over Whitewater Lake, Ontario, near Azilda, Ontario.
- August 18 - a rare, fire-generated EF0 tornado, was confirmed over the north shore of Gun Lake, British Columbia, near Gold Bridge, near a raging nighttime wildfire. Sometimes referred to as a 'pyrotornado', it is the first such fire-generated tornado recorded by the Northern Tornadoes Project in Canada. An area of snapped and uprooted trees was found at the shoreline near where the tornado was reported, but it is unclear if the tornado was over land at any point and caused the tree damage.
- August 24 - three tornadoes touched down in Southern Ontario. The first, an EF1, touched down near Tecumseh, destroying a barn and damaging grain bins and power poles along a 22 km (14 mi) path. A second EF1 tornado developed east of the end point of the Tecumseh tornado, damaging several homes and barns in the Cottam area along a 13.8 km (8.6 mi) path. The third, an EF0, touched down in the west end of Windsor, damaging trees, homes and fences along a narrow 12.5 km (7.8 mi) path. No injuries were reported.
- August 24 - an EF0 tornado moved onshore at Pointe Riche, Newfoundland and Labrador, damaging several picnic tables.

2023 Confirmed Tornadoes: BC / AB / SK / MB / ON / QC / NL / TOTAL; 1 / 19 / 1 / 8 / 32 / 9 / 1 / 71	2023 Tornado Strengths: EF0 / EF1 / EF2 / EF3 / EF4 / EF5; 43 / 23 / 4 / 0 / 1 / 0

=== 2024 ===
- March 16 - an EF1 tornado was confirmed in Malden Centre, Ontario, damaging a home. The tornado tied the provincial record, (March 16, 2016), for the earliest ever documented in a season.
- April 29 - an EF0 landspout tornado was confirmed east of Airdrie, Alberta near the rural community of Kathyrn, causing no damage.
- May 19 - an EF0 landspout tornado was confirmed west of Carmangay, Alberta, causing no damage.
- May 21 - an EF0 landspout tornado touched down near Three Hills, Alberta, causing no damage.
- May 27 - an EF1 tornado touched down in Rigaud, Quebec, approximately 70 km (43 mi) west of Montreal, damaging a house, barns and farm silos over a 14.3 km (8.9 mi) path.
- May 28 - an EF0 landspout tornado touched down near Albuna, Ontario, causing no damage.
- June 3 - five EF0 tornadoes were confirmed in Central Alberta. Four touched down near the village of Edberg, where three of the storms caused minor crop, tree and structural damage. The fifth tornado touched down near Gadsby, Alberta, causing no damage.
- June 4 - an EF2 tornado was confirmed in a forest near Landings Lake, Ontario.
- June 6 - an EF0 tornado touched down south of Spencerville, Ontario, causing weak tree and crop damage.
- June 12 - six tornadoes were confirmed across Saskatchewan and Manitoba. The first, an EF0, touched down near Saltcoats, Saskatchewan, causing structural and tree damage. Two EF0 tornadoes then touched down near Rivers, Manitoba, causing minor structural and tree damage. An EF1 tornado was confirmed in Spruce Woods Provincial Park, Manitoba, causing tree damage. The last two, and EF0 and EF1, touched down near Saint Alphonse, Manitoba. There was no visible damage from the EF0, while the EF1 destroyed a shed, damaged grain bins, and left a path through forests and rural cropland.
- June 13 - 5 tornadoes touched down in heavily forested areas in Western Quebec. Three EF2 tornadoes caused tree damage near Lac Nodier, Pointe Albert and Lac Bend, and 2 EF1 tornadoes caused tree damage near Lac Kwîkwîcî and Lac Darbit.
- June 13 - an EF1 tornado touched down in Pearson, Ontario, and crossed the ON-QC border ending in Nédélec, Quebec, damaging trees and a machine shed.
- June 18 - two EF2 tornadoes were confirmed near Saganagons Lake and Titmarsh Lake in Northern Ontario, damaging trees.
- June 19 - two EF1 tornadoes were confirmed north of Iroquois Falls, Ontario, near Moseley Lake and Bingle Lake, in heavily forested areas.
- June 20 - an EF0 landspout tornado was confirmed in Pain Court, Ontario, causing no damage.
- June 22 - an EF0 tornado was confirmed near Lena, Manitoba, causing no damage.
- June 22 - an EF0 tornado touched down near Melancthon, Ontario, uprooting trees and damaging a wind turbine. An EF0 landspout tornado was also confirmed at CFB Borden, Ontario, causing minor damage to trees and a low-rise building.
- June 23 - seven tornadoes were confirmed in south-central Saskatchewan, with six given an EF0 rating, touching down near Vonda (x2), Annaheim, Borden, and Fulda. A waterspout was also confirmed over Buffer Lake. Tree damage was found at several farm properties. An EF1 tornado was also confirmed in Annaheim, causing tree and building damage.
- June 23 - an EF0 tornado touched down in Deep River, Ontario, damaging trees and buildings, and flipping a boat.
- June 24 - two EF1 tornadoes were confirmed in Northwestern Ontario in remote forested areas, near Apitu Lake and Brunette Lake.
- June 26 - an EF0 waterspout occurred over Lake Erie, near Port Burwell, Ontario, causing no damage.
- June 27 - an EF0 waterspout was confirmed on the St. Lawrence River, near Cap-Saint-Ignace, Quebec, causing no damage.
- June 29 - six EF1 tornadoes were confirmed northwest of Kirkland Lake, Ontario, from Wavell to Keith Lake. All caused narrow paths of tree damage.
- June 30 - two EF0 tornadoes were confirmed in New Brunswick, near Carlow, and Centre Glassville, causing tree and house damage.
- July 1 - five weak EF0 tornadoes were confirmed in southeastern Saskatchewan, with no damage reported. Three tornadoes developed near Crescent Lake, and the other two near Gull Lake and Bredenbury.
- July 4 - an EF0 tornado touched down near Woodlands, Manitoba, causing no damage.
- July 5 - an EF0 waterspout was confirmed over Pechu Lake, in Northern Ontario, causing no damage.
- July 10 - two EF0 tornadoes touched down in London, Ontario, from the remnants of Hurricane Beryl, causing tree and crop damage.
- July 11 - a weak EF0 tornado was confirmed near Biggar, Saskatchewan, causing no damage.
- July 13 - an EF0 waterspout was confirmed over Lac Saint-Pierre, Quebec, causing no damage.
- July 17 - an EF1 tornado touched down in Saguenay, Quebec, snapping power poles and causing roof damage.
- July 20 - an EF0 landspout tornado was confirmed south of Glen Ewan, Saskatchewan, causing no damage.
- July 20 - an EF0 tornado was confirmed southwest of La Rivière, Manitoba, causing no damage.
- July 21 - an EF0 landspout tornado touched down in the Arcola East neighborhood of Regina, Saskatchewan, causing no damage.
- July 24 - an EF1 tornado touched down near Christie Lake, Ontario, near Perth, downing trees and damaging multiple properties along a 39.2 km (24.4 mi) path, ending near Jasper. No injuries were reported.
- July 24 - four tornadoes were confirmed in Quebec. The first, an EF0, touched down near Lakefield, northwest of Montreal, causing weak tree damage. A second EF0 touched down near Cap-Santé, Quebec, approximately 40 km (25 mi) southwest of Quebec City, damaging a farm. Another EF0 was confirmed in Boucherville, east of Montreal, causing no damage. The fourth, and strongest, an EF1, touched down in Brossard, Quebec, south of Montreal, where it caused tree damage and flipped a semi truck. The truck driver suffered minor injuries.
- July 26 - an EF0 waterspout was confirmed over the Gulf of St. Lawrence, off Cape Breton Island, near Malibu Mines.
- July 30 - an EF0 waterspout was confirmed over Lake Huron, near Little Current, Ontario.
- August 3 - an EF0 waterspout was confirmed over Lake Erie, near Erieau, Ontario, causing no damage.
- August 5 - three landspout tornadoes were confirmed in the Niagara Region of Ontario. The first, an EF1, developed near Brookfield and tracked east towards Stevensville, damaging trees and buildings along a 10 km (6.2 mi). A second EF1 touched down in Fort Erie, causing damage to a hardware store. The third, an EF0, was also confirmed in Fort Erie, before crossing the Niagara River into Buffalo, New York, where it was given an EF1 rating. No damage was reported in Ontario.
- August 6 - two weak EF0 tornadoes touched down in southwestern Ontario, near Muikirk and New Glasgow, causing tree damage.
- August 10 - three EF0 waterspouts were confirmed in eastern Ontario; 2 over Lake Ontario, near Brighton, and one near Gananoque, on the St. Lawrence River.
- August 11 - an EF0 waterspout was confirmed over Lake Nippising, near North Bay, Ontario.
- August 13 - an EF0 waterspout was confirmed over the Gulf of St. Lawrence in Margaree Harbour, on Cape Breton Island, causing no damage.
- August 16 - an EF0 waterspout was confirmed over the Atlantic Ocean, near Glace Bay, Nova Scotia, causing no damage.
- August 17 - an EF2 tornado touched down in Ayr, Ontario, damaging a hardware store, homes, vehicles and trees. Empty rail cars and a tractor-trailer were also overturned. No injuries were reported.
- August 17 - an EF0 waterspout was confirmed over Georgian Bay, near Collingwood, Ontario, causing no damage.
- August 21 - two EF0 tornadoes touched down in Eastern Ontario, near Newington and Morrisburg, causing minor damage.
- August 23 - two EF0 waterspouts were confirmed over the Gulf of St. Lawrence, near Les Îles-de-la-Madeleine, Quebec, and Inverness, Nova Scotia.
- August 24 - an EF1 tornado touched down north of Arcola, Saskatchewan, causing tree damage.
- August 25 - an EF0 waterspout was confirmed near Vaudreuil-Dorion, Quebec, over Lake of Two Mountains.
- August 27 - an EF0 waterspout touched down over Mabel Lake, British Columbia, east of Enderby, causing no damage.
- August 31 - three tornadoes were confirmed near Thunder Bay, Ontario, causing damage to trees and structures. The first, an EF0, touched down west of Nolalu, followed by two EF1 tornadoes confirmed west of South Gillies and south of Oliver Lake.
- September 9 - an EF0 tornado touched down in Niagara Falls, Ontario, snapping trees and damaging buildings. No injuries were reported.
- September 17 - three tornadoes touched down near Dryden, Ontario; an EF2 near Lac Seul, an EF1 near Film Lake and another EF1 near Morison Lake. All caused significant tree damage.
- September 18 - two EF1 tornadoes were confirmed near Langbank, Saskatchewan, causing damage to a home and grain bin in Vandura, and damaging a farm in Poplar Grove.
- September 26 - two EF0 tornadoes were confirmed in Sainte-Anne-de-la-Pérade and Saint-Stanislas-de-Champlain, Quebec, near Trois-Rivières, causing tree damage.
- October 10 - an EF0 waterspout was confirmed near Hog Island, Prince Edward Island.
- October 13 - an EF0 waterspout was confirmed over Lake Ontario near Burlington, Ontario.
- November 1 - three tornadoes were confirmed in New Brunswick. The first, an EF0, occurred near Harvey, causing minor tree damage. The second and third, both EF1s, touched down near Sheffield, and southeast of Elgin, causing minor tree damage.
- November 4 - an EF0 tornado touched down in Sechelt, British Columbia, downing trees. It was the third November tornado to occur in the province since 1980.
- November 10 - an EF0 tornado was confirmed in Fergus, Ontario, causing light tree damage and minor roof damage to homes.

2024 Confirmed Tornadoes: BC / AB / SK / MB / ON / QC / PE / NB / NS / TOTAL; 2 / 8 / 19 / 8 / 49 / 17 / 1 / 5 / 4 / 113	2024 Tornado Strengths: NR / EF0 / EF1 / EF2 / EF3 / EF4 / EF5; 0 / 73 / 32 / 8 / 0 / 0 / 0

=== 2025 ===
- April 12 - an EF0 landspout was confirmed near Rolling Hills, Alberta, causing no damage.
- April 29 - four EF1 tornadoes touched down in Quebec. The first tornado struck a forested area near Petit lac Crazy. The second tornado struck another forested area near Harrington Lake. The third tornado struck a forested area near Lac la Tour, southwest of La Tuque. The fourth tornado touched down in Saint-Zénon, damaging houses, barns, and trees. No injuries were reported.
- April 30 - a weak EF0 landspout tornado touched down near Tourond, Manitoba, causing no damage.
- May 15 - an EF0 landspout tornado was confirmed near Sperling, Manitoba, causing no damage.
- May 16 - an EF0 tornado touched down near Lakeside, Ontario, causing minor damage.
- May 21 - an EF0 landspout tornado was confirmed near Vanderhoof, British Columbia, causing no damage.
- May 26 - two EF1 tornadoes touched down northeast of Athabasca, Alberta. The first, near Atmore, uprooted trees and partially removed the roof from a home along a 21 km (13 mi) path. The second, near Avenir, snapped or uprooted many trees. No one was injured.
- June 2 - two EF0 landspout tornadoes touched down near Cut Knife, Saskatchewan causing minor damage.
- June 10 - an EF2 tornado touched down in a forested area near Lac Kamishakamatsh, Quebec, northwest of Saguenay.
- June 13 - two EF0 tornadoes touched down in Alberta, near Red Deer and Rivière Qui Barre, causing no damage.
- June 13 - an EF0 tornado touched down near Coleville, Saskatchewan, causing no damage.
- June 14 - an EF0 was confirmed near Hepburn, Saskatchewan, causing no damage.
- June 15 - an EF0 tornado touched down near Didsbury, Alberta, causing no damage.
- June 19 - ten tornadoes were confirmed in southern Saskatchewan, including two rated EF2. These occurred near Frobisher and Kronau, causing damage to power poles, oil tanks, and grain bins. Three EF1 tornadoes touched down near Blackstrap Lake, South Touchwood, and Hubbard, damaging rural properties. Five EF0 tornadoes were confirmed near Hirsch, Frobisher, Kronau, Vibank and Young, causing minor damage.
- June 19 - four tornadoes were confirmed in the eastern Quebec. The first tornado was an EF0 north of Lefebvre which caused mine tree damage. An EF1 touched down near Danville, damaging a barn, homes, trees and trailers. Two additional EF1 tornadoes touched down in forested areas near Saint-Évariste-de-Forsyth and Saint-Marcel. No injuries were reported from any of the tornadoes.
- June 21 - two EF0 tornadoes touched down near Glenbain and Cabri, Saskatchewan, causing no damage.
- June 19 - 22 - See Tornado outbreak and derecho of June 19–22, 2025
- June 23 - six tornadoes touched down in Quebec. The first two tornadoes touched down in forested areas west of the Gouin Reservoir: an EF1 near Lac de la Tête and an EF2 near Brécourt Lake. Later in the day, two EF1 tornadoes struck forested areas southeast of the Gouin Reservoir near Lac Garni de Bois and Lac Melbourne. In the evening, an EF0 tornado touched down near Saint-Raphaël, Quebec, damaging a barn, homes, trees and trailers. A EF1 tornado touched down in a forested area south of Notre-Dame-du-Rosaire. No injuries were reported from any of the tornadoes.
- June 27 - an EF0 tornado touched down near Rumsey, Alberta, causing no damage.
- June 29 - an EF0 tornado was confirmed near Stockholm, Saskatchewan, causing tree damage.
- June 30 - an EF0 tornado was confirmed near Lucan, Ontario, causing minor damage.
- July 2 - three tornadoes struck central Alberta. An EF2 tornado was confirmed near Lodgepole, causing tree damage. A second EF2 tornado was confirmed near Jackson Lake, causing tree damage. An EF1 tornado was confirmed in a forested area near Shaw Lake, east of Lac La Biche.
- July 5 - two EF1 tornadoes touched down in forested parts of Quebec, both causing tree damage. The first tornado occurred near Lac Vassal, northeast of Amos. The second tornado occurred near Lac de la Rencontre, northwest of Obedjiwan.
- July 9 - an EF1 tornado touched down near Strachan, Alberta, snapping trees along a 7.18 km (4.46 mi) path.
- July 10 - an EF2 tornado touched down in a forested area near Storey Lake, Ontario, west of Pikangikum.
- July 12 - four tornadoes were confirmed in forested areas of Northeastern Ontario and Western Quebec. Three of the tornadoes were rated EF2-strength and caused tree damage near Tarzwell, Crane Creek and Trethewey Lake. The fourth tornado was confirmed as an EF1, touching down northeast of Fugèreville, Quebec.
- July 17 - an EF1 tornado touched down in the morning in a forested area near Hemlock Lake, Ontario, in Algonquin Provincial Park.
- July 17 - an EF1 tornado touched down shortly after noon in a forested area near Lac Earley, Quebec, northeast of Otter Lake.
- July 20 - two EF0 tornadoes were confirmed in Saskatchewan. The tornadoes occurred near Elstow and Bradwell, both causing no damage.
- July 22 - three tornadoes touched down in Northwestern Ontario. Two EF1 tornadoes caused tree damage near Otterskin Lake and Wapageisi Lake. An EF2 tornado also caused tree damage along a 9.43 km (5.86 mi) path near Wink Lake.
- July 26 - an EF2 tornado touched down near Swallow Lake, Ontario, west of Thunder Bay. The tornado cut a 7.99 km (4.96 mi) path through the forest, causing significant tree damage.
- July 26 - two EF0 tornadoes were confirmed near Goderich, Ontario, causing tree and property damage. The first tornado tornado touched down near Porter's Hill, leaving a 6.00 km (3.73 mi) path. The tornado lifted and the storm cycled, producing a second tornado near Harlock. No injuries were reported and damage was minor. The storm also produced a waterspout over Lake Huron.
- July 27 - four tornadoes touched down in Northwestern Ontario. The first tornado was rated as an EF2 and carved a path through the forest near Law Lake, northeast of Mine Centre, Ontario. Three additional EF1 tornadoes also occurred in forested areas near Finlayson Lake, Log Lake and Candide Lake.
- July 28 - five tornadoes touched down northeast of Lake Superior in Ontario. The first tornado, an EF2, left a 9.61 km (5.97 mi) path of tree damage through a forested area near Whitefish Lake. An EF1 tornado also caused tree damage near McMaster Lake, northwest of Wawa. The final three tornadoes, all EF1s, caused tree damage east of Chapleau near Oscar Lake, Hellyer Lake and Ridley Lake.
- August 3 - three EF0 tornadoes touched down in Alberta. Two tornadoes occurred near Hardisty while one touched down near Kinsella. All three tornadoes caused minor tree and crop damage.
- August 3 - an EF1 tornado touched down in a forested area near Lac François, Quebec, northwest of L'Étape.
- August 5 - an EF0 tornado was confirmed near Gray, Saskatchewan, causing no damage.
- August 5 - an EF0 tornado was confirmed near Grande-Clairière, Manitoba, causing no damage.
- August 6 - two EF0 tornadoes were confirmed in Manitoba near Birds Hill Provincial Park, and Dugald, causing tree damage.
- August 7 - an EF0 tornado was confirmed near Barnwell, Alberta, causing no damage.
- August 7 - an EF1 tornado caused tree damage in a forested area near Greensides Lake, Ontario, southwest of Fort Hope.
- August 8 - an EF2 tornado caused tree damage in a forested area near Anderson Lake, Ontario, northeast of Red Lake.
- August 9 - an EF1 tornado caused tree damage in a forested area near Scott Lake, Ontario, southwest of Kakabeka Falls.
- August 13 - an EF1 tornado caused tree damage in a forested area near Hunters Lake, Saskatchewan, northwest of Prince Albert.
- August 14 - an EF1 tornado caused tree damage in a forested area near Coathup Lake, Ontario, east of Pikangikum.
- August 16 - an EF1 tornado caused tree damage in a forested area near Abbott Lake, Ontario, northwest of Sudbury.
- August 20 - an EF0 tornado touched down near Buffer Lake, Saskatchewan, damaging grain bins, trees and crops.
- August 21 - an EF2 tornado caused tree damage in a forested area near Wapisew Lake, Saskatchewan, south of Cumberland House.
- September 5 - four EF2 tornadoes struck down in forested areas of Western Quebec. The tornadoes touched down near Lac Disson, Lac Joannès, Lac Twin Sud and Senneterre. The longest was near Senneterre where the tornado cut a 27.6 km (17.1 mi) path through the forest.

2025 Confirmed Tornadoes: BC / AB / SK / MB / ON / QC / NB / TOTAL; 1 / 15 / 23 / 5 / 27 / 24 / 0 / 95	2025 Tornado Strengths: NR / EF0 / EF1 / EF2 / EF3 / EF4 / EF5; 0 / 37 / 38 / 20 / 0 / 0 / 0

=== 2026 ===
- May 9 - an EF0 tornado was confirmed near Lucan, Ontario, causing minor damage.
- May 17 - four EF0 landspout tornadoes were confirmed near Crestomere, Didsbury, Olds, and Usona in Central Alberta. No damage was reported.
- May 18 - five EF0 landspout tornadoes touched down in Central Alberta, near Olds, Garfield, Gull Lake, Blackfalds, and Ponoka, causing no damage.
- May 19 - an EF0 landspout tornado was confirmed landspout near Heisler, Alberta, cauing no damage.
- May 19 - three EF0 tornadoes were confirmed in Southwestern Ontario, near Christina, Lambeth, and Salford, causing minor damage.
- May 22 - an EF0 tornado was confirmed near Disley, Saskatchewan, causing no damage.
- May 25 - an EF0 tornado was confirmed near Saint-Thomas-Didyme, Quebec, causing minor damage.
- May 31 - an EF0 tornado was confirmed south of Laporte, Saskatchewan, causing no damage.
- June 2 - three EF0 tornadoes touched down in Southern Manitoba, near Douglas, Manitou, and Sperling, causing minor tree damage.
- June 7 - three EF1 tornadoes were confirmed in southern Saskatchewan, near Glen Ewan, Carnduff and Hirsch, damaging trees, homes and farm outbuildings. No injuries were reported.
- June 9 - an EF3 tornado heavily damaged a farmstead near Oxbow, Saskatchewan, along a 32 km (20 mi) path. It was the first EF3 tornado in Canada since a tornado hit Scarth, Manitoba in 2020.
- June 9 - two EF0 tornadoes were confirmed near Ste. Anne and Dufrost, Manitoba, causing minor damage.
- June 12 - a weak EF0 tornado touched down in Croton, Ontario, just north of Thamesville, damaging trees and crops.
- June 15 - an eight-tornado outbreak occurred in northwest Alberta from three different supercell thunderstorms, with six tornadoes occurring with one long-track supercell. The strongest, an EF2, touched down west of Girouxville, snapping trees, causing structural damage to homes and small buildings, and damaging a farm. Three EF1 tornadoes were confirmed: one north of Enilda, which tracked into the Sucker Creek First Nation area and caused minor damage to trees and a recreational trailer, as well as two others in forested areas northwest of Eaglesham. Four EF0 tornadoes were confirmed northwest of Hines Creek, east of Nampa, south of McLennan, and south of Falher, causing minor damage.
- June 16 - three EF0 tornadoes were confirmed near Tilley and Seven Persons, Alberta, causing no damage.
- June 18 - an EF0 landspout tornado was confirmed northwest of Viceroy, Saskatchewan, causing no damage.
- June 18 - an EF1 tornado touched down in a forested area near Lakefield, Quebec.
- June 25 - an EF1 tornado was confirmed west of Glencoe, Ontario, damaging barns, vehicles and trees along a 10 km (6.2 mi) path.
- June 26 - an EF0 tornado was confirmed near Petitcodiac, New Brunswick, causing minor damage.
- June 28 - three tornadoes touched down in southern Saskatchewan, with the strongest, an EF2, damaging homes and barns on several properties from Badgerville to Pelly. A second EF1 was also confirmed south of Pelly, damaging homes and trees, while an EF0 touched down near Stornoway, causing no damage. No injuries were reported.
- June 28 - four tornadoes were confirmed in Manitoba, including an EF3, which caused major damage to a home near Rossburn. An EF2 was confirmed near Roynick Lake, causing tree damage in Riding Mountain National Park. Two EF1 tornadoes were also confirmed; the first near Lake of the Prairies, damaging trees and buildings on a farm property, and another near Little Menzie Lake, also causing tree damage in Riding Mountain National Park.
- June 29 - an EF0 tornado touched down near Elrose, Saskatchewan, causing no damage.
- June 29 - an EF1 tornado touched down in the Whyte Ridge area of Winnipeg, Manitoba, damaging homes, businesses, and trees.
- June 30 - four tornadoes were confirmed across Ontario. Two weak EF0 tornadoes touched down in Eastern Ontario, forming under a mesovortex along the leading edge of a bow echo thunderstorm near Verona, damaging farm properties and trees along an 18.2 km (11.3 mi) path. The second touched down northeast of Kingston, causing tree damage from Silver Corners southeastward to CFB Kingston along a 10.9 km (6.8 mi) path. An EF1 was also confirmed near Ironside Lake, north of Sudbury, Ontario, and another EF1 near Ashby Lake, southeast of Bancroft. Both were found via satellite imagery review and caused tree damage. No injuries were reported.
- July 1 - an EF2 tornado was confirmed by satellite imagery near Lac Igloo, Quebec, 250 km (160 mi) northwest of Montreal, leaving a large scar through dense forest.
- July 2 - two tornadoes were confirmed in southern Saskatchewan. An EF0 touched down northeast of Kindersley, causing no damage, and an EF1 damaged grain bins, trees, a barn and farm equipment at a property southeast of Denzil. No injuries were reported.
- July 3 - two EF0 tornadoes touched down near Springwater, and Edam, Saskatchewan, causing no damage.
- July 6 - an EF2 tornado touched down near Deception Lake, west of Kenora, Ontario, causing tree damage.
- July 8 - two EF2 tornadoes touched down south of Lloydminster, Alberta. The first occurred near Paradise Valley, damaging a manufactured home, trees, and grain bins. The second touched down in Dillberry Lake Provincial Park, tossing boats, trailers, damaging trees, and injuring five people in a campground before crossing the provincial border into Saskatchewan and dissipating.
- July 10 - eleven tornadoes were confirmed in Saskatchewan, with three given an EF1 rating. They occurred near Speers, Redberry Lake, and Waldheim, damaging buildings and trees on residential properties. EF0 tornadoes were confirmed near Plunkett, Prud’Homme, near Dundurn, two near Cupar, two near Leross, and one near Herzel, causing widespread damage.
- July 11 - an EF3 tornado was confirmed near Tulliby Lake, Alberta, causing damage to several structures and agricultural and oil sites. One house was swept from its foundation.
- July 11 - eight tornadoes were confirmed across Saskatchewan, with the strongest, an EF1, touching down near Hatherleigh, causing tree damage. A second EF1 was also confirmed near Bronson Lake. Six tornadoes were given an EF0 rating, and occurred near Klein Lake, Spiritwood, two near Glaslyn, and two near Mildred, causing minor damage.
- July 11 - an EF0 waterspout was confirmed off the coast of Prince Edward Island near Pownal Bay, causing no damage.
- July 17 - an EF2 tornado was confirmed near Robb, Alberta, causing extensive tree damage at Coal Valley.
- July 18 - two EF2 tornadoes touched down near Rocky Mountain House, Alberta, destroying one building and damaging others.
- July 21 - two tornadoes were confirmed in southern Quebec. An EF1 tornado touched down in Harrington, snapping trees and hydro poles, and an EF0 was confirmed near Saint-Donat, causing tree damage.
- August 2 - an EF0 tornado touched down north of Kemptville, Ontario, causing tree damage in Ferguson Forest Centre.
- August 2 - an EF0 tornado was confirmed in Repentigny, Quebec, causing minor damage.
- August 8 - two EF0 tornadoes were confirmed in Ontario, near Lindsay and Woodstock, causing minor damage.
- August 12 - a weak EF0 tornado touched down near Carbon, Alberta, causing no damage.
- August 14 - an EF0 waterspout was confirmed on Christopher Lake in northern Saskatchewan.
- August 23 - four waterspouts were confirmed across Ontario. Two were confirmed over Lake Ontario, south of Grafton, Ontario; one over Lake Erie, east of Pelee Island; and one over Lake Huron near Ipperwash Beach.
- August 24 - three waterspouts were confirmed in Southern Ontario; 2 on Lake Ontario, south of Brighton and Grafton, and one on Rice Lake, near Harris Island.
- August 26 - two EF0 tornadoes were confirmed in eastern Prince Edward Island. The first touched down near Little Harbour, east of Souris, while the second formed as a waterspout over Rollo Bay, also east of Souris.
- August 26 - a waterspout was confirmed east of Wagmatcook, Nova Scotia, on Cape Breton Island, over St Patricks Channel.
- August 28 - a waterspout touched down over Georgian Bay, near Christian Island, Ontario, causing no damage.
- August 30 - an EF0 tornado was confirmed near Mayfield, Saskatchewan, causing no damage.
- August 30 - three tornadoes touched down in Manitoba, damaging farm properties and trees. An EF1 was confirmed near Kola, while two tornadoes, an EF1 and EF0, were confirmed near Elkhorn. No injuries were reported.
- August 31 - an EF0 waterspout was confirmed off the northwest shore of Cape Breton Island in eastern Nova Scotia, causing no damage.
- September 1 - an EF0 waterspout was confirmed in the Gulf of St. Lawrence near Cable Head East, Prince Edward Island.
- September 2 - four tornadoes touched down in southern Ontario. An EF0 touched down near Tavistock, Ontario, and three EF1 tornadoes were confirmed near Shakespeare, Wellesley, and Monkton, causing significant damage to agricultural structures and trees.
- September 3 - two tornadoes were confirmed in Southwestern Ontario. Multiple homes in Windsor were damaged after an EF1 tornado started in Detroit, Michigan and crossed the Detroit River. A second EF1 tornado touched down in Wheatley, damaging a barn and overturing two semi trucks. No injuries were reported.
- September 6 - two EF1 tornadoes were confirmed in southern Manitoba, near Bénard, and in the River Heights area of Winnipeg. There was roof damage to homes, sheds, trees and vehicles, including a car that was moved. One person was injured.
- September 7 - an EF0 landspout tornado touched down near Weyburn, Saskatchewan, causing no damage.

2026 Confirmed Tornadoes: AB / SK / MB / ON / QC / NB / NS / PEI / TOTAL; 28 / 37 / 15 / 28 / 6 / 1 / 2 / 4 / 121	2026 Tornado Strengths: NR / EF0 / EF1 / EF2 / EF3 / EF4 / EF5; 0 / 78 / 30 / 10 / 3 / 0 / 0

== See also ==
- List of Canadian tornadoes and tornado outbreaks (pre-2000)
- List of Canadian tornadoes in 2023
- List of Canadian tornadoes in 2025
- List of Canadian tornadoes in 2026
- List of fatal and violent Canadian tornadoes
- List of tornadoes by province (Canada)
- List of F5 and EF5 tornadoes
- List of F4 and EF4 tornadoes
  - List of F4 and EF4 tornadoes (2010–2019)
  - List of F4 and EF4 tornadoes (2020–present)
