= List of tornadoes by province (Canada) =

This article lists confirmed and probable tornadoes that have touched down in Canadian provinces and territories.

It is estimated that around 100 tornadoes occur in Canada each year, though only around 60 are formally confirmed. with most occurring in Southern Ontario, the southern Canadian Prairies and southern Quebec. Canada ranks as the second country in the world with the most tornadoes per year, after the United States. Of the average 30 confirmed tornadoes each year, Alberta and Saskatchewan both average between 14 and 18 tornadoes per season, followed by Manitoba and Ontario with normally between 8 and 14 tornadoes per season. Quebec is another recognized tornado-prone zone averaging between 4 and 8 tornadoes each year. Atlantic Canada and Interior British Columbia are also recognized tornado zones averaging between 0 and 4 tornadoes each year. The Canadian Territories are not typically seen as tornado-prone regions, however tornadoes can occur in the region. The peak season for tornadoes and severe thunderstorms in Canada is in the late spring and summer months, although tornadoes have occurred the fall and, very rarely, winter.

In Canada, tornadoes are rated based on the damage they cause using a set of "Damage Indicators" which estimate wind speeds based on different levels of damage. Before April 1, 2013, the scale used to rate tornadoes in Canada was the Fujita scale. Following this day, Environment Canada started to use the Enhanced Fujita scale. The most common intensities for tornadoes in Canada range between an EF0 to EF2 (F0 to F2) and usually result in minor structural damage to barns, wood fences, roof shingles, uprooted or snapped tree limbs and downed power lines. Tornadoes rated at an EF3 to EF4 (F3 to F4) have occurred in Canada, but are significantly rarer. Canada has only ever seen one confirmed EF5 (F5) tornado, which occurred in Elie, Manitoba.

Due to increasing detection (i.e. Doppler weather radar, social media, and satellite imagery), the number of confirmed tornadoes have increased substantially in recent years. In past decades, the number of tornadoes officially counted is likely underestimated. The uptick in confirmed tornadoes is also attributed to other factors, such as improved aerial and ground damage assessment after the fact in sparsely populated areas (particularly the case in remote parts of the Canadian Prairies and Northern Ontario, for example), better trained spotter capabilities and increased use of digital recording devices by citizens. In Canada, the Northern Tornadoes Project from Western University has taken over the survey, rating, and confirmation of tornadoes in Canada.

For a variety of reasons, such as Canada's lower population density and generally stronger housing construction due to the colder climate, Canadian tornadoes have historically caused far fewer fatalities than tornadoes in other parts of the world.

Tornadoes in Canada are enough of a threat for a public warning system to be in place, overseen by the national weather agency, Environment and Climate Change Canada (ECCC). With connections between Environment Canada and the Government of Canada, AlertReady is used for the public alerting method for various public hazards.

== Alberta ==
Date	Location of impact(s)	Strength	Death	Injuries	Damage	Other notes
=== 1883 ===
1883, July 14	Medicine Hat	Not rated			Caused damage to nearby buildings	
=== 1893 ===
1893, April 4	Lethbridge	Not rated			Caused damage to local storefronts	
=== 1897 ===
1897, July 13–19	Wheatland County	Not rated			Minor tree damage and a destroyed barn roof.	
=== 1905 ===
1905, July 12	Pine Lake	Not rated			Significant, but narrow damage; Various farm properties sustained damage with a house losing its roof and nearby buildings remaining untouched	Briefly became a tornadic waterspout as it crossed the lake
=== 1906 ===
1906, October 29	Coutts	Not rated			Tore a corner off the local blacksmith shop; blew over a windmill owned by the Great Northern Railway of Canada	
=== 1907 ===
1907, August 14	South of Vermillion	Not rated			destroyed a house, stables and corrals; killed 3 chickens	
=== 1909 ===
1909, July 1	Didsbury	Not rated				
1909, July 16	South of Lloydminster	Not rated		~4	House destroyed; Farm machinery broken and twisted; Debris tossed more than 183 meters	
=== 1911 ===
1911, March 13	Macleod	Not rated			Minor damage	
1911, June 30	Winnifred	Not rated			Destroyed barn; Damaged houses	
1911, July 2–8	Strome	Not rated			Minimal property damage	Was active for "a few seconds"
1911, August 11	Black Diamond	Not rated			Significant damage done to property; Accompanied by significant hail	
=== 1915 ===
1915, June 25	Grassy Lake Redcliff	F4	~5	~12	Multiple buildings levelled; Freight train derailed	
1915, July 14	West of Nanton	Not rated			School taken off foundation; Several buildings levelled	
=== 1918 ===
1918	Vermilion	Not rated	~3		Woman was carried over 27 m (30 yd).	
=== 1927 ===
1927, July 7	Vulcan	Not rated			A curling rink was destroyed; Damaged a dairy farm and a granary; Significant town damage	
=== 1936 ===
1936, July 6	Lavoy	Not rated			Building damage	
=== 1950 ===
1950, September 1	Rycroft; Eaglesham	Not rated			Damaged crops; Damaged farm buildings	
=== 1966 ===
1966, June 10	Nanton	Not rated			Tree damage	
=== 1972 ===
1972, July 28	Bawlf	Not rated		~3	Destroyed farm buildings; Destroyed a two-story house	
=== 1980 ===
1980, May 23	Schuler	F0				
1980, May 23	Hilda	F1				
1980, May 25	Aden; Cereal	F1				Two tornadoes
1980, May 25	Hilda	F0				
1980, June 2	Grassy Lake	F0				
1980, June 11	Foremost	F1				
1980, July 14	Sylvan Lake	F0				
1980, August 10	Aldersyde	F0				
=== 1981 ===
1981, June 5	Landonville	F1				
1981, June 5	Clandonald	F0				
1981, June 6	Clandonald	F0				
1981, July 13	West Edmonton	F1				
1981, July 14	Boyle	F0				
1981, July 15	Rivière Qui Barre	F2				
1981, July 25	Sangudo	F0				
=== 1982 ===
1982, May 7	Coutts	F0				
1982, May 13	Mayerthorpe	F1				
1982, May 13	Fort Assiniboine	F0				
1982, May 29	Magnolia	F0				
1982, June 2	Gainford	F1				
1982, June 6	Entwistle	F1				
1982, June 30	Southeast of Rocky Mountain House	F3		~1	Destroyed a mobile home; Estimated C$500,000 of damage	
1982, June 30	North of Viking	F2				
1982, June 30	Lacombe; Kinsella	F1				Two tornadoes
1982, July 1	Consort	F1				
1982, July 6	Langdon	F0				
1982, July 11	Clive	F0				
1982, July 14	Jackfish Lake; Benalto; Sylvan Lake; Wetaskiwin; Sherwood Park; Vegreville	F0				Six tornadoes
1982, July 14	Barrhead; Duffield; Stony Plain; Lacombe	F1				Four tornadoes
1982, July 18	Lucky Lake	F0				
1982, July 30	Rocky Mountain House	F0				
1982, August 11	Alix; Edgerton; Stettler	F0				Three tornadoes
1982, August 15	Vauxhall	F0				
1982, September 10	Calgary	F1				
=== 1983 ===
1983, July 8	Blackfoot	Not rated				
=== 1984 ===
1984, June 29	Athabasca	Not rated		~1	Destroying granaries; Destroying farm equipment	
=== 1986 ===
1986, June 18	High Prairie	Not rated			Roof damage	Two tornadoes
1986, June 29	Stirling; Cayley	Not rated			Destroyed a storage shed	Two tornadoes
1986, July 9	Penhold Sylvan Lake	Not rated				Two tornadoes near Penhold; One tornado near Sylvan Lake
=== 1987 ===
1987, July 31	Edmonton	F4	~27	~253		Second deadliest tornado in Canadian history
1987, July 31	Southeast Edmonton	F1				
1987, July 31	Beaumont; Millet to Vegreville	F2			Estimated C$40,000 of damage	Two tornadoes
1987, July 31	Edmonton Area Central Alberta	F0				Four tornadoes
=== 1989 ===
1989, July 27	Edmonton	F1			Estimated C$500,000 of damage	
=== 1993 ===
1993, July 29	Holden	F3				
1993, July 29	Northeast of Lac La Biche	F1				
1993, July 29	Falun	F0				
=== 1998 ===
1998, July 19	Daysland	Not rated			Damaged power lines	
=== 2000 ===
2000, July 14	Pine Lake	F3	~12		Estimated C$13,000,000 of damage	Fourth deadliest tornado in Canadian history
2000, July 23	Marwayne	F3			Destroyed one home	
2000, July 26	Wabamun	Not rated				
2000, August 1	Viking	Not rated				
2000, August 6	Elnora	Not rated				
2000, August 9	Sangudo	Not rated				
=== 2001 ===
2001, July 13	Caroline	Not rated				
=== 2003 ===
2003, July 11	Westlock County	Not rated				
2003, August 13	Wabamun	Not rated		Few		
=== 2004 ===
2004, April 18	Raymond	Not rated				
2004, June 13	Vulcan	Not rated				
2004, July 8	Grande Prairie	F2			Damage to homes and businesses	
2004, July 11	Andrew	Not rated				
=== 2005 ===
2005, June 4	Central Alberta; Southern Alberta	Not rated			Tree damage	Four cold-core funnels briefing touch the ground
2005, June 21	Lethbridge	Not rated				
=== 2007 ===
2007, June 25	Standard	Not rated			Destroyed a barn	
2007, July 8	Mayerthorpe	Not rated				
2007, July 23	Edmonton International Airport; Kavanagh; Millet	Not rated			No major damage	Tornado involved all the places listed
=== 2008 ===
2008, June 6	Heisler	Not rated			Minor damage	
2008, June 10	Wabamun	Not rated				
2008, June 22	Viking	Not rated			Tree and fence damage	
2008, July 6	Airdrie	Not rated				
2008, July 15	Vulcan	F1			Damaged two granaries	
2008, July 16	Edmonton	F0				
=== 2009 ===
2009, May 31	Southeast of Lloydminster	F0				
2009, June 25	Northeast of Hanna	F1			Barn roof damage	
2009, June 25	Cairns	F0			Siding and shingles damage	
2009, July 4	Red Deer	F1			Tree damage	
2009, August 1	Airdrie	F0				
=== 2010 ===
2010, June 29	Whitecourt	Not rated				
2010, July 30	Sundre	Not rated				Another unconfirmed tornado near Water Valley
2010, August 22	Grande Prairie	Not rated				
=== 2011 ===
2011, July 7	Bergen; Olds; Bowden; Innisfail	Not rated			Farms destroyed; Trees damaged	Several tornadoes throughout Central Alberta
2011, July 13	Southwest Calgary	F0				
=== 2012 ===
2012, June 5	Taber; Turin; Brooks; Bow Island	Not rated				At least one confirmed tornado and three unconfirmed tornadoes.
2012, June 9	Stettler	Not rated			Minor damage	
2012, July 3	Southwest of Olds	F1			House and barn damage	
2012, July 28	Cremona	Not rated			Farm damage	
=== 2013 ===
2013, June 12	Pigeon Lake	Not rated				Became a waterspout
2013, June 19	Pakowki Lake	Not rated				
2013, July 4	Stavely	Not rated				
2013, July 24	Okotoks	Not rated				
=== 2014 ===
2014, June 13	Northwest of Gleichen	Not rated				
2014, June 27	Cremona	Not rated				
2014, June 29	Wainwright	Not rated				
=== 2015 ===
2015, June 4	Airdrie	EF0				
2015, June 21	Cochrane	Not rated				
2015, July 22	Priddis; Gleichen	Not rated				Two tornadoes
2015, August 5	Langdon	Not rated				
2015, August 6	Foremost	Not rated				
2015, September 13	Didsbury	Not rated				
=== 2016 ===
2016, April 13	Calgary	EF0				
2016, June 30	Ponoka	EF1			Damaged homes	
2016, July 1	West of Didsbury	EF0				
2016, July 2	South of Longview; Northwest of Pekisko	EF0			Tree damage	Two tornadoes
2016, July 3	Hardisty	EF1			Damaged farm	
2016, July 6	Monitor	EF0				
2016, July 13	Endiang	EF0				
2016, July 17	Okotoks	EF0			Minor damage	
2016, August 4	Vermilion	Not rated				
2016, August 10	Schuler	Not rated				
2016, August 21	Edson	EF0				
=== 2017 ===
2017, June 2	Three Hills	EF1			Tree and roof damage	
2017, June 9	Mannville	EF0				
2017, July 1	Sangudo	EF0				
2017, July 9	Sunchild First Nation	EF0				
2017, July 10	Northwest of Calgary International Airport	EF0				
2017, July 13	Breton	EF1			Tree and roof damage	
2017, July 13	Athabasca	EF0				
2017, October 7	Jenner	EF0				
=== 2018 ===
2018, May 24	Calmar	EF0				
2018, June 9	St. Paul	Not rated				
=== 2019 ===
2019, April 24	Peers	EF0			Damaged a fence; Damaged a shed	
2019, June 14	Seven Persons	EF0				
2019, June 23	North of Fort Macleod	EF0				
2019, June 25	2 km south of Sexsmith	EF0				
2019, June 26	Millet	EF0				
2019, June 28	15 km east of Lac La Biche	EF0				29-millimetre sized hail reported
2019, June 28	20 km southeast of Slave Lake	EF0				
2019, June 28	Cold Lake	EF0			Damaged a few trees as it made landfall	Golf Ball sized hail reported; Dissipated about 10 minutes after formation
2019, July 8	75 km south of Grande Prairie	EF0				Touched down at around 4:40pm
2019, July 14	Northeast of Crossfield	EF0				Touched down at around 2:15pm
=== 2022 ===
2022, July 7	South of Sundre	EF2			Destroyed one house; Damaged several properties	
2022, July 18	Redcliff	EF2				
=== 2023 ===
2023, May 31	East of Stettler	EF0		~2		Second Canadian tornado of 2023, first Albertan tornado of 2023. Landspout tornado.
2023, July 1	South of Didsbury	EF4		~2	9 homes damaged; 5 others completely destroyed	First F4/EF4 tornado in Alberta since the 1987 Edmonton tornado
=== 2024 ===
2024, May 19	West of Carmangay	EF0				Near Clear Lake; Touched down at 1:47 pm.
2024, May 19	West of Three Hills	EF0				Touched down at around 12:40 pm.
2024, June 3	Southwest of Edberg	EF0				Touched down at 2:38 pm.
2024, June 3	Southeast of Edberg	EF0				Touched down at 2:52 pm.
2024, June 3	Southeast of Edberg	EF0				Touched down at 2:53 pm.
2024, June 3	Edberg	EF0				Touched down at 2:56 pm.
2024, June 3	Southeast of Gadsby	EF0				Touched down at 4:45 pm.
=== 2025 ===
2025, April 12	Rolling Hills	EF0				First recorded Canadian tornado of 2025; Touched down at 5:22 pm.
2025, May 26	Atmore to Rossian	EF1				Touched down at around 7:00 pm.
2025, May 26	Avenir	EF1				Touched down at around 7:25 pm.
2025, June 13	Southern Red Deer	EF0				Touched down at around 2:30 pm.
2025, June 13	North of Rivière Qui Barre	EF0				Touched down at around 4:50 pm.
2025, June 15	East of Didsbury	EF0				Touched down at around 3:30 pm.
2025, June 27	East of Rumsey	EF0				Touched down at around 1:15 pm.
2025, July 2	East of Lac La Biche	EF1				Near Shaw Lake; Touched down at around 11:25 pm.
2025, July 2	North of Lodgepole	EF2				First EF2 in Canada for 2025; Touched down at around 5:10 pm.
2025, July 2	Northeast of Lac La Biche	EF2				Near Jackson Lake; Touched down at around 11:30 pm.
2025, July 9	West of Rocky Mountain House	EF1				Touched down at around 2:55 pm.
2025, August 3	Northeast of Hardisty	EF0				Touched down at around 4:25 pm.
2025, August 3	North of Hardisty	EF0				Touched down at around 4:40 pm.
2025, August 3	East of Kinsella	EF0				Touched down at around 5:10 pm.
2025, August 7	North of Barnwell	EF0				Touched down at 6:29 pm.
=== 2026 ===
2026, May 17	Northwest of Usona	EF0				Touched down at 5:03 pm.
2026, May 17	West of Crestomere	EF0				Touched down at around 5:10pm.
2026, May 17	Northeast of Didsbury	EF0				Touched down at 5:29 pm.
2026, May 17	Southeast of Olds	EF0				Touched down at around 6:45 pm.
2026, May 18	Southwest of Olds	EF0				Touched down at around 12:50 pm.
2026, May 18	South of Garfield	EF0				Touched down at around 5:15 pm.
2026, May 18	East of Gull Lake	EF0				Touched down at around 5:15 pm.
2026, May 18	South of Blackfalds	EF0				Touched down at 5:21 pm.
2026, May 18	West of Ponoka	EF0				Touched down at 5:38 pm.
2026, May 19	Northwest of Heisler	EF0				Touched down at 5:03 pm.
2026, June 16	South of Tilley	EF0				Touched down at 2:51 pm.
2026, June 16	Southeast of Tilley	EF0				Touched down at around 3:01 pm.
2026, June 16	Northeast of Seven Persons	EF0				Touched down at around 3:45 pm.

=== List of Alberta tornado strengths (1883-2023) ===
Not rated	F0 (EF0)	F1 (EF1)	F2 (EF2)	F3 (EF3)	F4 (EF4)	F5 (EF5)
~65	~398	~143	~30	~5	~3	~0

== British Columbia ==
Date	Location of impact(s)	Strength	Death	Injuries	Damage	Other notes
=== 1890 ===
1890, September 5	Victoria	Not rated			Minor fence damage was reported.	
=== 1893 ===
1893, April 13	Victoria	Not rated				
=== 1897 ===
1897, June 21	Nicola	Not rated			Snapped trees	
=== 1903 ===
1903, June 18	Mount Sicker	Not rated			Tree damage	
1903, November 10	Arrowhead	Not rated			Threw a Reid & Young 20 feet off its foundation	
=== 1906 ===
April 5	Rivers Inlet	Not rated			Destroyed a cannery	
=== 1910 ===
September 8	Creston	Not rated			Significant damage; Timber blocks weighing 400 pounds thrown 200 yards	
=== 1911 ===
April 15	Nanaimo	Not rated			Trees uprooted, fences downed, shingles torn off	
=== 1983 ===
1983, November 10	Millar Channel	F0	2		Fishing boat hit and capsized	
=== 1988 ===
1988, May 1	Vancouver	F0				
=== 1990 ===
1990, June 30	Bednesti	F0				
1990, July 5	Soda Creek	F2			Impressive tree damage; Downgraded from F3	
1990, July 6	100 Mile House	F0				
1990, August 13	Tachie	F2			Significant damage	
=== 1991 ===
1991, March 10	Pitt Meadows	F0			Damage to a greenhouse resulted in $3,500	
1991, April 5	Lac La Hache	F1			Ripped the roof off a Motel, resulting in $16,000 in damage	
1991, July 2	Cluculz Lake	F2				
=== 1992 ===
1992, June 9	Prince George	F0				
1992, June 28	Northwest of Alexis Creek	F1				
=== 2001 ===
2001, July 24	Cranbrook	F1				
2001, September 6	Humamilt Lake	F1				
=== 2002 ===
2002, August 10	Dawson Creek	F0				
=== 2003 ===
2003, July 16	Quesnel	F2				
=== 2008 ===
2008, August 18	Cluculz Lake	F0				
=== 2011 ===
2011, August 11	Trutch Creek County	F2				
2011, August 11	Kahntah County	F2				
=== 2013 ===
2013, July 1	East of Liard River	EF1				
=== 2018 ===
2018, September 2	Nyland Lake	EF1				
2018, September 16	Mission	EF0			Minor tree damage	
=== 2019 ===
2019, July 17	Jimmac Lake	EF1				
=== 2020 ===
2020, May 21	Victoria	EF0			Trampoline thrown	
2020, August 21	Fort St. John	EF0				
=== 2021 ===
2021, November 6	UBC Point Grey Campus	EF0			Downed trees, power lines, and trolley bus wires; Damage to vehicles; Road closures and reroutes to bus services	
=== 2022 ===
2022, July 31	Ken Lake	EF1				
=== 2023 ===
2023, July 22	Breadalbane Lake	EF1				
2023, August 18	Gun Lake	EF0				Firenado
=== 2024 ===
2024, August 27	Mabel Lake	EF0				
2024, November 4	Sechelt	EF0			Minor tree damage	
=== 2025 ===
2025, May 21	Vanderhoof	EF0				

=== List of British Columbia tornado strengths (1926-2023) ===
Not rated	F0 (EF0)	F1 (EF1)	F2 (EF2)	F3 (EF3)	F4 (EF4)	F5 (EF5)
~8	~16	~9	~6	~0	~0	~0

== Manitoba ==
Date	Location of impact(s)	Strength	Death	Injuries	Damage	Other notes
=== 1900 ===
1900, June 5	Winnipeg	Not rated	~1		Destroyed buildings	
=== 1908 ===
1908, October 5	Morris	Not rated			Damaged farm buildings; Tossed farm machinery	
1908, October 6	Birds Hill	Not rated			Destroyed two homes; Snapped telephone poles	
=== 1922 ===
1922, June 22	Southern Manitoba	Not rated	~5	Hundreds	Estimated C$2,000,000 of damage	Multiple tornadoes; Damage costs are in dollars of the time
=== 1955 ===
1955, June 19	Vita	Not rated			No fatalities, 30 injuries; Estimated C$500,000 of damage	Damage costs are in dollars of the time
=== 1958 ===
1958, January 1	Amaranth	Not rated				
=== 1959 ===
1959, June 6	La Salle	Not rated			Destroyed a garage	
=== 1977 ===
1977, July 18	St. Malo	F4	~3		Destroyed houses and barns; Peeled asphalt off Highway 59	
=== 1980 ===
1980, April 6	St-Malo	F0				
1980, May 28	Morden	F0				
1980, July 26	Pinaymootang First Nation, in Fairford	F0				
1980, July 29	Bowsman	F0				
=== 1981 ===
1981, June 4	Melita	F0				
1981, July 3	Grandview	F0				
1981, July 14	Notre-Dame-de-Lourdes	F0				
1981, August 30	Plumas	F0				
=== 1982 ===
1982, July 16	Emerson; Hadashville; Melita; St. Alphonse; Morden; Southwest of Portage la Prairie	F0				Six tornadoes
1982, August 14	Decker	F0				
=== 1984 ===
1984, July 8	St. Claude; Rosenort	F3				
=== 1992 ===
1992, June 24	Southern Manitoba; Portage la Prairie	Not rated				Five tornadoes
=== 1994 ===
1994, August 27	Turtle Mountain	F4			Estimated over C$1,000,000 of damage	
=== 1995 ===
1995, June 20	Manitoba	Not rated				Thunderstorms throughout Manitoba produced one tornado
=== 2006 ===
2006, July 14	Gretna	Not rated			Damaged crops, trees and a shed	
2006, August 5	Gull Lake	F2	~1			
2006, August 20	La Broquerie	F2			Destroyed a house	
=== 2007 ===
2007, June 22–23	Elie	F5			Destroyed four homes; Damaged a flour mill	First ever F5 tornado in Canada
2007, June 22–23	Pipestone; Glenora; Baldur; Oakville	F3				Three tornadoes
2007, June 22–23	Southern Manitoba	Not rated				Three tornadoes
=== 2008 ===
2008, May 25	Altona	Not rated				Two tornadoes
2008, May 31	Niverville	Not rated				
2008, June 9	Morris	Not rated				
2008, June 27	Gladstone; Neepawa; Arden; Westbourne; MacGregor	Not rated				Five tornadoes
2008, July 7	Turtle Mountain Provincial Park	Not rated			Sunk boats; Damaged docks	
2008, September 1	La Broquerie	Not rated			Minor damage	
=== 2009 ===
2009, June 1	Winnipeg	F0				
2009, July 4	Swan River	F0				
2009, July 7	Valhalla	F0				
2009, July 31	Telford	F0				
=== 2010 ===
2010, June 22	Woodlands	Not rated			Destroyed a garage; Damaged a house	
2010, June 23	Rosser	Not rated				Additional funnel clouds were reported throughout the region
2010, July 13	Carman	Not rated				
2010, July 26	Oakbank	Not rated				
=== 2011 ===
2011, May 28	St. Adolphe	Not rated				Likely an F0 but unconfirmed rating
2011, September 18	East of Winnipeg	Not rated				
=== 2013 ===
2013, July 13	Pipestone; Hartney	Not rated			Damaged homes; Overturned mobile homes; Tree damage	Two tornadoes
2013, July 21	Between Boissevain and Deloraine	Not rated				
2013, July 24	Morris	Not rated				
=== 2014 ===
2014, July 5	Hartney	Not rated				
2014, July 26	Waterhen; La Salle	Not rated				Three tornadoes (two near Waterhen and one near La Salle)
=== 2015 ===
2015, June 24	Near Manitou	EF0				Two tornadoes
2015, July 12	Ninette	Not rated				
2015, July 18	Winnipeg Beach	Not rated				
2015, July 27	Tilston	EF2			Damaged a farm; Overturned trucks; Bridge damage	Longest lived tornado documented in Canada
2015, August 7	Anola	Not rated				
=== 2016 ===
2016, May 31	Miami	EF0				
2016, June 3	Southwest of Elgin	Not rated				
2016, June 19	Southwest of Grand Rapids	Not rated				
2016, July 20	Long Plain First Nation	EF1			House damage; Tree damage	
2016, July 20	Hartney Souris	Not rated				Two tornadoes
2016, July 23	Russell	Not rated				
2016, July 31	Camperville	Not rated				
2016, August 3	Margaret; Glenboro; Morden	Not rated	~150 sheep		Minor building damage; Tree damage	Three tornadoes
2016, August 8	Waywayseecappo First Nation; Northeast of Erickson	EF2			Overturned school bus; Damaged homes; Destroyed a home	Two tornadoes
2016, August 8	South of Russell	EF0				
2016, August 8	Elphinstone	Not rated				
2016, August 24	Eddystone	Not rated				
=== 2017 ===
2017, June 21	Sapotaweyak Cree Nation	EF0				
=== 2018 ===
2018, June 14	South of Waskada	Not rated				
2018, June 30	Pauingassi First Nation	EF0				
2018, July 1	Lake Manitoba	Not rated			Tornadic waterspout	
2018, July 22	Lake of the Prairies	Not rated				There were also reports of funnel clouds near Waywayseecappo, Manitoba.
2018, August 3	Alonsa; Silver Ridge; Margaret Bruce Beach; Lake Manitoba	EF4	~1		Destroyed and damaged multiple homes; De-barked and ripped trees; Overturned mobile homes, vehicles, and farming equipment; Threw vehicles and mobile homes into Lake Manitoba	Recorded to be on the ground between 20 and 45 minutes; Became a waterspout following the destructive trail; First EF4 in Canada since switching to the Enhanced Fujita scale
=== 2020 ===
2020, June 29	Rapid City	EF2			Buildings demolished; Trees snapped	
2020, August 8	Virden	EF3	~3		Barn destroyed; Trees snapped	
2020 August 13	Alexander	Not Rated				
2020, August 21	Shoal Lake	Not Rated				
2021
2021, May 14	Friedensruh Roblin	Not Rated				
2021, May 15	Sandy Bay	Not Rated				
2021, June 9	Altona	EF0			Structural, vehicle damage; Trees damaged	
2021, August 20	Westergaard Lake Bryan Lake	EF1				
2021, August 20	Betula Lake	EF2				
2022
2022, June 25	Lake St. Martin	Not Rated				
2022, June 29	Kenville	EF2			Wide damage path through forested areas	
2022, July 9	Argyle Stonewall	EF0				
2022, August 2	Netley Teulon	Not Rated				
2022, August 8	Apussigamasi Lake	EF1			Damage path in forested areas	
2022, August 18	Lake Manitoba St. Ambroise	Not Rated			Tornadic Waterspout	Event location estimated
2022, August 18	Beausejour	EF0				
2022, September 1	Lasthope	EF1			Moderate damage to trees in forests	
2023
2023, June 4	Carberry	Not Rated			Short path through cropland	
2023, June 20	MacGregor	EF1			Grain bin lightly damaged; Trees moderately damaged	
2023, June 20	Killarney	EF1			Structural and tree damage	
2023, June 20	William Lake	EF1			Damage path through forested areas	Tornado started near Carpenter Lake, ND before crossing the border into MB
2023, June 26	Keyes Neepawa	Not Rated				
2023, June 28	Brookdale	Not Rated			Visible crop damage path	
2023, June 28	Venlaw	Not Rated			Visible crop damage path	
2023, July 26	Ranger Lakes	EF2			Damage path lightly carved ground	

=== List of Manitoba tornado strengths (1900-2023) ===
Not rated	F0 (EF0)	F1 (EF1)	F2 (EF2)	F3 (EF3)	F4 (EF4)	F5 (EF5)
~72	~263	~77	~26	~5	~4	~1

== New Brunswick ==
Date	Location of impact(s)	Strength	Death	Injuries	Damage	Other notes
=== 1872 ===
1872, ?	Westmorland County	Not Rated			Fences and houses destroyed; Trees snapped	
=== 1879 ===
1879, August 3	Bouctouche	F3	~5	~10	Many buildings destroyed; Estimated C$100,000 in damage	Easternmost intense tornado in North America; Tenth deadliest tornado in Canadian history
=== 1890 ===
1890, August 6	Sainte-Anne-Parish	Not Rated			31 buildings destroyed	
=== 1901 ===
1901, July 15	Kingsclear Parish New Maryland Parish	Not Rated			Barns and crops damaged	
=== 1980 ===
1980, August 9	Maple Green	F0				
=== 1981 ===
1981, July 8	Scotchtown	F2			Estimated C$10,000 of damage	
=== 1982 ===
1982, July 19	Bathurst	F1			Estimated C$10,000 of damage	
=== 1983 ===
1983, September 7	McNamee	F1				
=== 1989 ===
1989, August 14	Carlisle	Not Rated			Barn destroyed; Trees uprooted	
1989, August 14	Likely Carleton County	Not Rated				
1989, August 14	Likely Carleton County	Not Rated				
=== 1992 ===
1992, June 12	Fredericton	F0				
=== 1993 ===
1993, July 10	McGivney	F1			Mature trees snapped and/or uprooted.	Golf-ball sized hail reportedly fell.
=== 1994 ===
1994, June 18	Mactaquac	F1			Steel roof torn off a barn; Trees uprooted	
1994, July 13	Petite-Rivière de L'Île	F1			Heavy trailers moved; Trees uprooted; 5500kg steel shed lifted and rotated	Pea to Walnut-sized hail fell.
1994, September 17	Dundee	F2			Mobile home lifted 12-18m and destroyed; Debris thrown 2.5 km away	
=== 1995 ===
1995, July 26	Fredericton	F1			Building damage; Power poles downed	
1995, July 26	Keswick Ridge	F2			Roof torn off; Trees uprooted	
=== 1997 ===
1997, July 4	Grand Falls	F1			Farmers field ripped up; Roof torn off a building under construction	
=== 1998 ===
1998, July 10	Charleston	F2		2	Mobile home thrown 30m, completely destroying it	Occupants inside sustained minor injuries
=== 1999 ===
1999, July 18	Northeast of Moncton	F0			Probable F1	
1999, July 18	Durham Bridge	F0			A few trees downed; Power lines snapped	
=== 2002 ===
2002, July 4	Saint-Jacques; Moulin-Morneault; Saint-Joseph-de-Madawaska; Deuxième-Sault	F1			Damaged trees; Damaged homes; Damaged businesses	
=== 2004 ===
2004, July 31	Saint-Jacques	F1			Trees snapped at the trunk; Siding torn off a house	
=== 2005 ===
2005, July 13	Jacksontown	F1				
=== 2006 ===
2006, July 2	South Johnville Argyle	F2			Heavy tree damage; Severe damage to power lines and houses; Numerous barns damaged; One barn reportedly flattened.	Hail up to 3 cm
2006, July 2	Nashwaak Lake	F2			Multiple areas of many downed trees	
2006, July 4	Glassville	F1			Structure and forest damage	
2006, August 15	Pokemouche Evangeline	F1			Trees uprooted and snapped	
2006, September 24	Kedgwick	F2			Wall removed from a house; Trees damaged	
2006, September 24	Upsalquitch	F1			Tree damage	
=== 2007 ===
2007, June 16	Petitcodiac	F0			Trees snapped; Playground equipment thrown long distances	
2007, August 3	White Rapids	F1			Several farm buildings destroyed	Ice-cube sized hail fell over Blackville.
=== 2013 ===
2013, July 20	Jemseg; Codys; Whites Cove; Cambridge-Narrows	EF1			Several buildings were damaged; Trees damaged	
=== 2015 ===
2015, August 1	Sheephouse Falls	EF1				
=== 2016 ===
2016, July 18	Saint-Quentin	EF1			Large number of trees blown down	30,000 tonnes of fallen timber salvaged
=== 2018 ===
2018, August 7	Knowlesville	EF1				
=== 2022 ===
2022, July 21	Wild Goose Lake	EF2			Trees snapped and uprooted	
=== 2024 ===
2024, June 30	Carlow	EF0			Trees and a house damaged in near Carlow	
2024, June 30	Centre Glassville	EF0			Mild tree damage	
2024, November 1	Harvey Lake	EF0			Minor tree damage; Dock lofted	
2024, November 1	Sheffield	EF1			Minor tree & trampoline damage	
2024, November 1	Churchs Corner	EF1				

=== List of New Brunswick tornado strengths (1879-2023) ===
Not rated	F0 (EF0)	F1 (EF1)	F2 (EF2)	F3 (EF3)	F4 (EF4)	F5 (EF5)
~6	~8	~20	~9	~1	~0	~0

== Newfoundland and Labrador ==
Date	Location of impact(s)	Strength	Death	Injuries	Damage	Other notes
=== 1983 ===
1983, August 3	Gander Bay South	F0				
=== 1987 ===
1987, August 30	St. Lawrence	F0				
=== 1991 ===
1991, July 16	Grand Falls-Windsor	F1				
=== 1996 ===
1996, September 6	Trinity	F1				
=== 1998 ===
1998, ?	Buchans	?				
=== 2007 ===
2007, July 29	Gander Bay	F0			Flipped some snowmobile trailers	
2007, July 29	Grand Falls-Windsor	F0				
=== 2018 ===
2018, September 3	South of Wabush	EF2			Snapped and uprooted many trees	Tornado briefly moved over Rectangle Lake
=== 2023 ===
2023, August 24	Point Riche	EF0			Originally was a waterspout, came ashore.; Damaged several picnic tables.	

=== List of Newfoundland and Labrador tornado strengths (1983-2023) ===
Not rated	F0 (EF0)	F1 (EF1)	F2 (EF2)	F3 (EF3)	F4 (EF4)	F5 (EF5)
~1	~5	~2	~1	~0	~0	~0

== Northwest Territories ==
Date	Location of impact(s)	Strength	Death	Injuries	Damage	Other notes
=== 1978 ===
1978, July 30	Yellowknife	F2			Severe damage to weakly built houses; Toppled a tower	
=== 2006 ===
2006, ?	Caribou and Blanchet islands on Great Slave Lake	?				
=== 2012 ===
2012, July 19	Near Inuvik Airport	?				Funnel cloud confirmed through photo taken on a cell phone, but did not touch down. One of the northernmost funnel cloud sighted around the world.
=== 2015 ===
2015, ?	Great Slave Lake near Hay River	?				Waterspout
=== 2019 ===
2019, June 2	Fort Smith	EF1			Multiple sheds flipped; Severe damage to roofs and nearby trees	

=== List of Northwest Territories tornado strengths (1978-2023) ===
Not rated	F0 (EF0)	F1 (EF1)	F2 (EF2)	F3 (EF3)	F4 (EF4)	F5 (EF5)
~0	~0	~1	~1	~0	~0	~0

== Nova Scotia ==
Date	Location of impact(s)	Strength	Deaths	Injuries	Damage	Other notes
1895, August 4	Bridgetown-Clarence-Paradise	Not rated	0	0	Barns destroyed.; House obliterated.; Trees uprooted and thrown.; Top story of a building carried for a mile and with parts embedded over 3 feet into the ground.	Likely the strongest tornado to touch down in Nova Scotia.; Damage is consistent with a strong(EF3+) tornado.
=== 1954 ===
1954, January 30	White Point	F1	0	0	Snapped trees.; Damaged cabins.; Barn destroyed.	
=== 1955 ===
1955, July 18	Tidnish Area	F1	0	0	Cabins severely damaged.	Allegedly three waterspouts that came onshore.
=== 1980 ===
1980, July 22	Roseway	F0	0	0	Trees uprooted.; Camper trailer carried 3-5m and overturned.	
1980, August 16	Northport	F0	0	0	No damage reported.	
=== 1997 ===
1997, June 24	Lantz	F0	0	0	No damage reported.	Golf ball-sized hail reportedly fell.
=== 1999 ===
1999, August 18	Pugwash	F0	0	0	Dining room ripped from a cafe.	
=== 2016 ===
2016, August 7	Grand Mira South	EF0	0	0	Damage unknown.	
=== 2021 ===
2021, June 30	Stewiacke	EF1	0	0	Barn destroyed.	
2021, July 22	Antrim	EF0	0	0	No damage reported.	

=== List of Nova Scotia tornado strengths (1954-2023) ===
Not rated	F0 (EF0)	F1 (EF1)	F2 (EF2)	F3 (EF3)	F4 (EF4)	F5 (EF5)
~0	~6	~3	~0	~0	~0	~0

== Ontario ==
Date	Location of impact(s)	Strength	Death	Injuries	Damage	Other notes
=== 1792 ===
1792, June 30	Between Fonthill and Port Robinson	Not rated			Leveled houses; Damaged trees; Damage could have been F2	Is the oldest recorded tornado in Canada; Was two miles wide, making the widest tornado in Canada; Damaged trees along "Hurricane Road"
=== 1829 ===
1829, April 18	Between Collingwood and Niagara-on-the-Lake	Not rated			Damaged a saloon	Many tornadoes
1829, June 2	Guelph	Not rated				Strong tornado
1829, August 7	Galt	Not rated	~1			
=== 1860 ===
1860, May 19	Aurora	Not rated			Houses damaged; Tree damage	
=== 1880 ===
1880, June 10	Listowel	Not rated				
=== 1884 ===
1884, May 15	Elora Mapleton	F4			Destroyed barns and stables; Damaged a church	
=== 1885 ===
1885, June 7	North Middlesex; St. Thomas	Not rated			Damaged houses and orchards	
=== 1888 ===
1888, June 6	Cornwall	Not rated	~3		Destroyed houses; Destroyed barns; Destroyed outbuildings	Tornado passed from Cornwall to Montreal
1888, August 16	South Glengarry	Not rated	~9	~16	Damaged property	Tornado passed into Quebec; Fifth deadliest tornado in Canadian history
=== 1892 ===
1892, June 29	London	Not rated			Destroyed barns; Destroyed outbuildings	
=== 1898 ===
1898, September 26	Merritton	Not rated	~5			Tornado passed from Merritton into New York State
=== 1902 ===
1902, July 17	Chesterville	F4	~5	~12	Flattened homes and barns	Marionville to Osnabruck Centre; Furniture found on tree tops 200 yards away
=== 1923 ===
1923, June 24	Hornby; Cooksville	Not rated				
=== 1946 ===
1946, June 17	Windsor; Tecumseh	F4	~17		Estimated over C$9,000,000 of damage	Third deadliest tornado in Canadian history; First touched down in the US
1946, June 24	Fort Frances; Rainy River	F3				Tornado passed from International Falls, Minnesota, into Ontario
1946, December 12	Exeter	F2				
=== 1948 ===
1948, March 19	Windsor	Not rated				
=== 1953 ===
1953, May 21	Sarnia	F4	~7	Over 68		Tornado passed from Michigan into Ontario
=== 1966 ===
1966, May 6	Westport	F0			Damaged a few buildings	
=== 1967 ===
1967, April 17	Huron and Perth counties; St. Jacobs	F3			Estimated over C$8,200,000 of damage	Two tornadoes
1967, April 17	Southwestern Ontario	F0	~1			Two tornadoes
=== 1970 ===
1970, August 20	Sudbury; Lively; Copper Cliff	F3	~6	Over 200	Estimated C$17,000,000 of damage	Eighth deadliest tornado in Canadian history
=== 1972 ===
1972, July 22	Algonquin Provincial Park	Not rated				
=== 1973 ===
1973, July 13	Brighton	Not rated		~1	Damaged city hall; Damaged a church; Destroyed most trees	
1973, August 27	Algonquin Provincial Park	Not rated				
=== 1974 ===
1974, April 3	Windsor	F3	~9	Over 20	Estimated C$500,000 of damage	Sixth deadliest tornado in Canadian history
=== 1979 ===
1979, August 7	Woodstock; Stratford	F4	~2	Over 150	Estimated over C$100,000,000 of damage	Two tornadoes
1979, August 7	Woodstock	F0				*A satellite of the Woodstock-Stratford F4
=== 1980 ===
1980, May 5	Stratford	F1				
1980, May 31	Between Georgetown to Woodbridge	F0			Estimated C$900,000 of damage	
1980, June 9	Whitby	F0				
1980, July 15	Wellesley	F0			Estimated C$50,000 of damage	
1980, July 16	LaSalle	F1			Estimated C$500,000 of damage	
1980, August 8	Wheatley	F1				
1980, August 11	North Woodslee, Port Dover	F0			Estimated C$20,000 of damage	Two tornadoes
1980, August 14	London	F2			Estimated C$100,000 of damage	
1980, August 14	Springfield; Meath; Kirk Cove; Stanleyville	F0				Four tornadoes
1980, August 25	Neskantaga First Nation	F0				
1980, September 2	Jarratt	F3				
1980, September 2	South Lancaster	F1				
1980, September 2	Houghton Centre	F0				
1980, September 22	Woodbridge; Blenheim	F1				Two tornadoes
1980, September 22	Stratford; Primrose; Mariposa; Lakefield	F0				Four tornadoes
1980, September 25	Teeswater	F2				
=== 1981 ===
1981, March 30	Bothwell	F1				
1981, March 30	Hickson	F0				
1981, June 3	Midland	F0				
1981, June 6	Near Harcourt	F1				
1981, June 10	Near Acton	F0				
1981, July 18	Near Bond Head, Ontario [clarification needed]	F0				
1981, July 19	Near Thornhill; Maple; Arden	F0				Three tornadoes
1981, August 4	Bradford	F0				
1981, August 8	Brantford	F0				
1981, August 11	Niagara-on-the-Lake	F0			Estimated C$200,000 of damage	
1981, September 10	Shannonville	F1				
1981, September 10	Howe Island; Adolphustown	F0				Two tornadoes
=== 1982 ===
1982, May 28	Dobbinton	F0			Estimated C$2,000 of damage	
1982, June 15	Strathroy	F1				
1982, June 15	Chatham; Burford; Port Burwell	F0				Three tornadoes
1982, June 22	Mississauga	F1				
1982, June 22	Exeter	F0				
1982, July 18	Crowes Landing	F0				
1982, August 8	Cochrane	F0			Estimated C$100,000 of damage	
1982, August 19	Mattawa	F0				
1982, August 25	Mount Brydges; London	F1				Two tornadoes
=== 1983 ===
1983, May 2	Walpole Island, Ontario; Kettleby	F2		~1	Estimated C$1,000,000 of damage	Two tornadoes
1983, May 2	Reece's Corners	F4		~13	Estimated C$20,000,000 of damage; Destroyed 15-25 buildings	
1983, May 2	Rexdale	F0			Estimated over C$1,200,000 of damage	Three tornadoes
=== 1984 ===
1984, June 18	Westport	F2		Damaged a few buildings		
1984, August 14	Toronto	Not rated			Estimated millions of damage	
1984, September 2	Melrose; Forest; Staffa; Sebringville; Southwest of London; Bothwell	Not rated		~30		Six unrated tornadoes
=== 1985 ===
1985, May 31	Barrie	F4	~8	~155	Destroyed over 300 buildings; Estimated C$100,000,000 of damage	Seventh deadliest tornado in Canadian history
1985, May 31	Grand Valley; Orangeville; Tottenham	F4	~4	~69		
1985, May 31	Rice Lake; From Alma to Hillsburgh	F3				Two tornadoes
1985, May 31	Ida; Lion's Head	F2				Two tornadoes
1985, May 31	Wagner Lake; Reaboro; Minto; Grippen Lake	F1				Four tornadoes
1985, May 31	Leamington	F0				
1985, July 7	Mississauga	F1		~10	Estimated C$400,000 of damage	
1985, September 7	Big Rideau Lake	Not rated	~1			
1985, October 4	Wheatley	Not rated				
=== 1986 ===
1986, June 16	Brady Lake to Maynooth	F3				
1986, June 16	Southern Ontario	Not rated				Two tornadoes
=== 1987 ===
1987, July 22	Foam Lake	F1				
=== 1988 ===
1988, June 12	Mirage Lake	F2			Confirmed by the NTP nearly 37 years later on January 16th, 2025.	
=== 1990 ===
1990, August 28	Port Stanley; Frome; St. Thomas; Delaware	F3	Killed several horses		Destroyed houses; Destroyed barns	
1990, August 28	Komoka	F2			Destroyed a church	
1990, August 28	Kendal	F1				
=== 1991 ===
1991, March 27	Sarnia	Not rated			Estimated C$25,000,000 of damage	
=== 1994 ===
1994, August 4	Carp	Not rated				
=== 1995 ===
1995, July 15	Near Bridgenorth, Ontario	F2	~1		Overturned a houseboat	
1995, July 15	Central Ontario	Not rated				Five tornadoes
1995, August 14	Barrie	Not rated				
=== 1996 ===
1996, April 20	Grey, Wellington and Dufferin counties	F3		~9	Significant property damage	Two tornadoes
1996, May 20	Stoney Creek	Not rated				
=== 1997 ===
1997, July 2	Essex and Kent Counties	F1			Minor structure damage	
=== 1998 ===
1998, June 2	Holbrook	F1			Damaged many buildings including a church	Funnel cloud reports throughout the area
=== 1999 ===
1999, August 4	Burlington	F2				
=== 2000 ===
2000, May 5	Hazzards Corners	F0			Minor damage	
2000, May 9	North of Amherstburg	F1			Tree damage	
2000, May 9	Malden Centre	F0			Damaged shed	
2000, May 23	Appin	F2	Several pigs		Damaged a pig barn; Damaged homes	
2000, May 24	Gloucester	F1			Damaged trees; Damaged a gas station	
2000, July 17	Guelph	F2		~1	Estimated over C$2,000,000 of damage	
2000, July 17	Near Melduf	F1			Damaged trees; Damaged crops	
2000, July 17	Waterdown	Not rated				
2000, August 9	Tilbury	F1			Destroyed a barn; Damaged a few homes	
=== 2001 ===
2001, June 8	Upper Manitou Lake	F0			Major tree damage	
2001, July 4	Argyle; Campbellville; Ayr	F0				Three tornadoes; Unconfirmed tornado near Arthur
2001, July 4	Fenelon Falls	F1			Knocked over a silo	Unconfirmed tornado near Bancroft
=== 2002 ===
2002, May 31	North Bay	Not rated				Two tornadoes
2002, June 23	Ottawa	Not rated				
2002, July 28	Halfway Lake Provincial Park	Not rated		~4	Damaged trees; Flooding rains in Southern Ontario	
=== 2004 ===
2004, May 22	Mitchell	F2				
2004, May 22	Gad's Hill	F3			Extreme property damage	
2004, June 9	Escott	F1	~1		Destroyed garage; Destroyed a barn; Tree damage	
2004, August 10	Burnstown	F1			Barn damage; Destroyed a shed; Damaged trees	
=== 2005 ===
2005, August 19	Milverton to Conestogo Lake; Salem to Lake Belwood	F2			Destroyed and damaged homes and businesses; Damaged and destroyed trees	Two tornadoes, see Southern Ontario tornado outbreak of 2005
2005, August 19	Tavistock	F1				
2005, November 9	Hamilton	F1			Damaged school; Damaged homes; Damaged businesses	
=== 2006 ===
2006, July 17	Newmarket	F1				
2006, July 17	Newmarket	F0				
2006, August 2	Guelph; Drag Lake; Uffington; Catchacoma; Galway-Cavendish and Harvey Township	F0				Five tornadoes
2006, August 2	West Guilford; Minden Hills; Anstruther Lake	F1			Destroyed bridge	Three tornadoes
2006, August 2	Combermere; Bancroft	F2			Damaged train cars; Destroyed trees; Damaged trailer site; Estimated over C$1,000,000 of damage; Destroyed barns	Two tornadoes
=== 2007 ===
2007, May 15	Mitchell	F1			Minor damage	
2007, July 8	Mildmay	F1				Another unconfirmed tornado was sighted in the area
2007, September 11	Batchawana Bay	F0			Property damage	
=== 2008 ===
2008, May 26	Windy Lake Provincial Park	F0			No fatalities, injuries or property damage.	
2008, June 6	Echo Bay	F0			Damaged warehouse	
2008, June 8	Ruthven	F1				
2008, June 8	Lucan; Brantford	Not rated				Two tornadoes; One unconfirmed tornado near Strathroy
2008, June 22	Bryanston	F0			Damaged pig barn; Damaged trees	
2008, July 22	Welland	F0				
2008, July 26	Coboconk	F1				
=== 2009 ===
2009, April 25	Round Lake Centre; Guelph; Windsor; Ottawa	F0			Damaged trees and hydro poles; Destroyed roofs; Damaged planes	Four tornadoes
2009, April 25	Breslau	F1			Damaged a barn; Damaged a silo; Damaged trees	
2009, June 25	Avon	F2			Damaged roof	
2009, June 25	Leamington; Harrow	F1			Minor damage	Two tornadoes
2009, July 3	Verona	F0			Minor damage	
2009, July 7	Estaire	F0				
2009, July 9	Ear Falls; Wenesaga Lake	F1			Damaged homes; Snapped trees	
2009, July 9	Fisherman's Cove Resort	F2	~3	Few		
2009, July 26	Woodstock	F0			Damaged a tree	
2009, August 20	Between New Lowell and Edenvale	Not rated				
2009, August 20	Markdale; Moonstone; Gravenhurst; Dollars Lake; Redstone Lake; Orono	F0		~1	Damaged parks; Damaged homes; Damaged trees	Six tornadoes
2009, August 20	Ril Lake; Arnstein; Haliburton Forest; Bancroft / Carlow/Mayo; Rice Lake	F1			Damaged parks; Damaged homes; Damaged trees	Five tornadoes
2009, August 20	Durham; Clarksburg to Blue Mountain; Vaughan	F2	1		Damaged parks; Damaged homes; Damaged trees; Estimated at C$ 100,000,000	Eighteen tornadoes; 69,000 Hydro One customers lost power; Most tornadoes seen in one region in Canadian history
2009, August 22	Markham	F0			Minor damage	
2009, September 28	Bowmanville	F1			Damaged barns; Damaged trees	
=== 2010 ===
2010, June 6	Leamington	F1			Estimated over C$1,000,000 of damage	
2010, June 6	Dalkeith; Ste-Anne-de-Prescott	F1				
2010, June 23	Rowntree Beach	F2		~0-15	Damaged trees	
2010, June 23	West of Washago	F1		~0-15		An unconfirmed tornado was reported in Essex
2010, June 27	Essex to Staples; Cottam	Not rated				Two tornadoes
2010, July 23	Amherstburg	F0			Damaged trees; Damaged homes	An unconfirmed tornado was reported near Ruthven
=== 2011 ===
2011, April 27	Fergus	F0			Damaged trees; Damaged buildings	
2011, July 23	Wyoming	F2			Towers blown over; Destroyed a barn; Damaged hydro poles	
2011, August 8	Plattsville	F0				
2011, August 16	Dryden; Northwest of Sioux Lookout; Ear Falls / Wenesaga Lake Area; Ear Falls	F1			Tree damage	Four tornadoes
2011, August 21	Goderich	F3	~1	~40+	Damaged trees; Destroyed downtown; Damaged and destroyed homes; Damaged salt mine	
2011, August 21	Gananoque	F1			Destroyed a shed; Damaged trees	
2011, August 24	Little Corners; West of Nairn	F1			Damaged trees	Two tornadoes
2011, August 24	Neustadt	F0			Tree damage	
2011, August 24	Cambridge	F1			Tree damage, damage to homes	
2011, September 3	Grimsby	F0			Destroyed gazebo; Damaged trees	
=== 2012 ===
2012, May 22	Orono	F0				
2012, May 29	Bourget	F0			Tree damage; Minor roof damage	
2012, June 18	Sioux Lookout	F1			Tree damage	
2012, July 17	Athens	F1			Tree damage; Damaged buildings	
2012, July 17	Summerstown	F0			Tree damage; Crop damage	
2012, July 22	Embro	F0				
2012, August 11	Midland	F0				
2012, September 8	Odessa	F2			Destroyed a workshop	
2012, September 11	Wellington	F0			Minor damage	
=== 2013 ===
2013, April 18	Near Shelburne	EF1			Destroyed a large stable	
2013, May 21	Glenarm	EF2			Roof destroyed	
2013, May 21	Elmvale Dalston	EF0			Minor damage	Two tornadoes
2013, May 22	Highway 401 near Mallorytown.	EF0			Re-located a truck	
2013, May 29	Casselman	EF0				
2013, June 1	Kenilworth	EF0				
2013, June 16	Near Beaver Lake	EF0				
2013, June 28	Springwater	EF0				
2013, July 18	North of Massey	EF1			House damaged; Tree damage	
2013, July 19	Near Teviotdale	EF0				
2013, July 29	Ottawa	EF0				
2013, August 1	Carleton Place	EF0				
2013, August 2	Magiskan Lake	EF0				
2013, August 7	North of Orillia; Between Arthur and Grand Valley; Carnarvon	EF0				Three tornadoes; An additional waterspout was confirmed near Head Lake, Ontario
2013, August 7	North of Haliburton	EF1			Damaged trees	
2013, September 1	Near Fergus; West of Salem	EF0				Two tornadoes
2013, November 23	Prescott	EF1			Damaged farm silo	
=== 2014 ===
2014, May 13	Mildmay	EF1			Damaged a house; Damaged a barn; Damaged trees	
2014, May 13	Conestogo Lake	EF0				
2014, June 17	Angus	EF2			Damaged over 75 homes	
2014, June 17	Stroud	EF1			Destroyed a farm shed; Damaged trees	Two unconfirmed tornadoes near Owen Sound, Ontario, and Hanover
2014, June 24	Orangeville to Amaranth; New Tecumseth	EF1			Damaged vehicle; Damaged trees; Damaged homes; Damaged a barn	Two tornadoes
2014, June 30	Bear Lake	EF0			Minor tree damage	
2014, July 7	Norwich	EF0				
2014, July 15	Lake Nipissing; North Bay/Jack Garland Airport	EF0				Two tornadoes
2014, July 27	South of Grand Bend	EF1		~1	Tree damage; Home damage	
2014, July 27	Millbank	EF0				
2014, August 5	Asubpeeschoseewagong First Nation	EF0			House damage	
2014, August 19	Windsor Harrow	EF0			Destroyed gazebo; Damaged trees; Damaged barn	Two tornadoes
2014, August 20	Erin	EF0				
2014, September 5	Christian Island	EF0			Tree damage	
2014, September 5	Udney	EF1			House damage; Farm damage; Community Center damage	
2014, September 10	Port Alma	EF1			Damaged trees	
2014, October 6	Sheffield	EF1			Damaged homes	
=== 2015 ===
2015, May 30	Bryanston	EF1			Damaged barn roof	
2015, June 22	Holmesville	EF0			Minor damage	
2015, August 2	Teviotdale; Lebanon	EF2			Damaged homes; Destroyed a barn; Damaged a few silos; Damaged a sailboat; Damaged Ontario Provincial Police (OPP) cruisers	Two tornadoes
2015, August 2	Marsville; Millgrove	EF1			Damaged a barn; Damaged trees	Two tornadoes
2015, August 19	Northeast of Kapuskasing	EF2			Damaged trees	
2015, October 15	Coniston	EF0			Damaged trees; Damaged roof	
=== 2016 ===
2016, March 16	Mount Forest	EF1			Damaged a barn; Damaged trees	Earliest confirmed tornado in the province's history
2016, July 1	Buckhorn Lake; Swift Rapids	EF0				Two tornadoes
2016, August 11	Delaware	EF0			Damaged houses; Damaged crops	
2016, August 13	Georgina	EF1			Damaged a few buildings	
2016, August 13	Ashburn	EF0			Tree and crop damage	
2016, August 24	LaSalle	EF1			Minor damage	
2016, August 24	Windsor	EF2		~3	Multiple buildings	
2016, August 30	New Liskeard	EF0				
2016, September 10	Prince Edward County	EF0			Tree damage; Minor property damage	
2016, October 17	Stayner	EF1			Tree damage	
=== 2017 ===
2017, April 11	Thamesford	EF1			Damaged a barn	
2017, June 14	Dryden	Not rated			Tree damage	
2017, July 6	Quetico Provincial Park	EF2			Tree damage	
2017, July 12	Lucan; Lake Simcoe	EF0				Two tornadoes; The waterspout located over Lake Simcoe was recorded as a tornadic waterspout and was rated
2017, July 25	Dryden	Not rated			Tree damage	
2017, August 4	Utterson; Huntsville to Fairy Lake	EF1			Tree damage; Flipped docks; House damage	Two tornadoes
2017, August 4	Pell Lake to Dotty Lake	EF2			Tree damage; Cottage damage	
2017, August 11	Leamington	EF0			Greenhouse damage; Damaged solar panels	
2017, August 11	Hawkesville	EF2			Damaged farm buildings and shed	
2017, September 22	Werner Lake	EF0			Damaged a cabin; Tree damage	

=== 2018-2019 ===
Date	Location of impact(s)	Strength	Maximum Length	Maximum Width	Death	Injuries	Damage	Notes	Event Notes
==== 2018 ====
2018, June 13	North of Norwich	EF0					No reported damage	This tornado dissipated north of Norwich before the storm later produced an EF2 tornado southwest of Jarvis	
2018, June 13	Southwest of Jarvis	EF2	0.8 km (0.50 mi)	0.190 km (0.12 mi)			Significant tree damage; Damaged flag pole; Destroy barn and farm outbuildings	This tornado developed from the same storm that produced an EF0 tornado earlier in the day north of Norwich	
2018, June 17	Midlothian Lake	EF1	8.9 km (5.53 mi)	0.300 km (0.19 mi)			Significant tree damage through a heavily forested area	All the tornadoes on this day occurred from the same complex of storms	
2018, June 17	Northwest of Charlton	EF1	10.1 km (6.28 mi)	0.410 km (0.25 mi)			Significant tree damage through a heavily forested area	All the tornadoes on this day occurred from the same complex of storms	
2018, June 17	Nursey Lake	EF2	19.1 km (11.87 mi)	0.700 km (0.43 mi)			Significant tree damage through a heavily forested area	All the tornadoes on this day occurred from the same complex of storms	
2018, June 17	Southeast of Matachewan	EF2	10.8 km (6.71 mi)	0.400 km (0.25 mi)			Significant tree damage through a heavily forested area	All the tornadoes on this day occurred from the same complex of storms	
2018, July 4	South of McNamara Lake	EF1	13.9 km (8.64 mi)	1.100 km (0.68 mi)			Significant tree damage through a heavily forested area	This tornado developed from the same storm that produced an EF1 tornado further southeast near Shaw Lake around the time this tornado touched down	
2018, July 4	Near Shaw Lake	EF1	11.2 km (6.96 mi)	0.860 km (0.53 mi)			Significant tree damage through a heavily forested area	This tornado developed from the same storm that produced an EF1 tornado further northwest near McNamara Lake around the time this tornado touched down	
2018, July 26	Southwest of Lagoon City over Lake Simcoe	EF0					No reported damage		
2018, July 26	White Lake	EF0	0.3 km (0.19 mi)	0.080 km (0.05 mi)			Weak tree damage	This tornado started as a waterspout over White Lake	
2018, July 29	Northeast of Morpeth; Southwest of Palmyra	EF0	0.64 km (0.40 mi)	0.030 km (0.02 mi)			Week tree damage		An EF0 waterspout was confirmed south of Port Glasgow over Lake Erie
2018, August 8	West of Brantford	EF0					No reported damage		
2018, August 9	West of Thorah Island on Lake Simcoe	EF0					No reported damage	Both waterspouts west of Thorah Island were concurrent	An additional funnel cloud was reported northwest of Beaverton over Lake Simcoe
2018, August 9	West of Thorah Island on Lake Simcoe	EF0					No reported damage	Both waterspouts west of Thorah Island were concurrent	An additional funnel cloud was reported northwest of Beaverton over Lake Simcoe
2018, August 21	East of Bailiboro	EF0	2.42 km (1.50 mi)	0.100 km (0.06 mi)			Weak structural and tree damage		
2018, August 27	Near Gilchrist; Oro Station	EF0	8.64 km (5.37 mi)	0.190 km (0.12 mi)			Weak structural and tree damage		
2018, September 21	North of Leggat Lake; North of Hollywood Bay; Sharbot Lake	EF1	21.8 km (13.55 mi)	0.600 km (0.37 mi)			Significant tree damage through a heavily forested area; Weak structural damage		Three additional EF2 tornadoes occurred in Quebec
2018, September 21	North of Black Donald; Calabogie; South of Springtown; White Lake; South of Waba	EF2	37.6 km (23.36 mi)	1.210 km (0.75 mi)		~1	Significant tree damage through a heavily forested area; Destroyed buildings	This tornado dissipated south of Waba before the storm produced an EF3 north of Pakenham later in the day	Three additional EF2 tornadoes occurred in Quebec
2018, September 21	Kanata; Nepean; Ottawa	EF2	21.4 km (13.30 mi)	0.750 km (0.47 mi)		~23	Significant tree damage through a heavily forested area in Kanata; Several hundred structures were damaged or destroyed; Critical components of the electrical grid were damaged		Three additional EF2 tornadoes occurred in Quebec
2018, September 21	North of Pakenham; Near Kinburn; Dunrobin; Gatineau	EF3	48.8 km (30.32 mi)	1.450 km (0.90 mi)		~10	Significant tree damage through a heavily forested area; Several hundred structures were damaged or destroyed	This tornado developed from the same storm that produced an EF2 tornado earlier in the day from Calabogie to White Lake; This tornado crossed the Ottawa River into Quebec	Three additional EF2 tornadoes occurred in Quebec
2018, September 25	Amherstburg	EF0	0.125 km (0.08 mi) in Canada 0.563 km (0.35 mi) in Michigan	0.100 km (0.06 mi) in Canada 0.230 km (0.14 mi) in Michigan			Weak structural and tree damage	This tornado developed over Gibraltar as an EF1 tornado and crossed the Detroit River into Ontario where it was rated as an EF0 tornado; This tornado dissipated north of Amherstburg before the storm produced two EF1 tornadoes near McGregor and Staples later in the day	One additional EF0 tornado occurred in Michigan; One additional EF1 tornado occurred in Michigan
2018, September 25	West of McGregor	EF1	1.6 km (0.99 mi)	0.150 km (0.09 mi)			Structural and tree damage	This tornado dissipated near McGregor before the storm produced another EF1 tornado near Staples later in the day; This tornado developed from the same storm that produced an EF0 tornado earlier in the day north of Amherstburg	One additional EF0 tornado occurred in Michigan; One additional EF1 tornado occurred in Michigan
2018, September 25	East of Staples	EF1	2.75 km (1.71 mi)	0.050 km (0.03 mi)			Structural and tree damage	This tornado developed from the same storm that produced an EF0 tornado north of Amherstburg and an EF1 near McGregor earlier in the day	One additional EF0 tornado occurred in Michigan; One additional EF1 tornado occurred in Michigan
==== 2019 ====
2019, June 2	Orleans; Northwest of Cumberland	EF1	10.6 km (6.59 mi)	0.250 km (0.16 mi)		~1	Structural, fence and tree damage; Shattered windows	This tornado dissipated northwest of Cumberland before the storm later produced another EF1 tornado north of Clarence Creek	
2019, June 2	South of Rockland; North of Clarence Creek	EF1	6.9 km (4.29 mi)	0.250 km (0.16 mi)			Structural and tree damage	This tornado developed from the same storm that produced an EF1 tornado earlier in the day in Orleans	
2019, June 13	South of Aberfoyle; Northwest of Morriston	EF0	3.2 km (1.99 mi)	0.050 km (0.03 mi)			Weak tree damage; Damaged crane		
2019, July 11	Southwest of Pembroke	EF0	1.44 km (0.89 mi)	0.210 km (0.13 mi)			Weak tree damage		One EF1 downburst was confirmed earlier in the day in Weslemkoon Lake; Two EF1 downbursts were confirmed earlier in the day in Quebec; Two EF1 tornadoes were confirmed in Quebec
2019, July 15	Tupman Lake; Otukamamoan Lake	EF1	21.0 km (13.05 mi)	0.350 km (0.22 mi)			Significant tree damage through a heavily forested area		Four EF1 downbursts were confirmed in Buckingham Lake, near Shebandowan, in Grimm Lake and in Mishkeegogamaang First Nation
2019, July 15	Lake Despair	EF1	5.7 km (3.54 mi)	0.550 km (0.34 mi)			Significant tree damage through a heavily forested area		Four EF1 downbursts were confirmed in Buckingham Lake, near Shebandowan, in Grimm Lake and in Mishkeegogamaang First Nation
2019, July 15	Little Bear Lake	EF1	5.5 km (3.42 mi)	0.270 km (0.17 mi)			Significant tree damage through a heavily forested area	This tornado developed from the same storm that produced an EF2 tornado earlier in the day near Little Trout Lake	Four EF1 downbursts were confirmed in Buckingham Lake, near Shebandowan, in Grimm Lake and in Mishkeegogamaang First Nation
2019, July 15	Little Trout Lake	EF2	17.5 km (10.87 mi)	0.900 km (0.56 mi)			Significant tree damage through a heavily forested area	This tornado dissipated east of Little Trout Lake before the storm later produced an EF1 tornado near Little Bear Lake	Four EF1 downbursts were confirmed in Buckingham Lake, near Shebandowan, in Grimm Lake and in Mishkeegogamaang First Nation
2019, July 17	Southwest of Craighurst	EF0					Weak tree damage		An additional funnel cloud was reported near Leamington
2019, July 17	Longbow Lake; South of Kenora over Lake of the Woods	EF0					Weak structural and tree damage		One EF1 downburst was confirmed over Bare Island along the northern shores of Rainy Lake; Two additional EF1 tornadoes occurred in Minnesota; One additional unrated waterspout occurred in Minnesota
2019, July 17	Rainy Lake	EF1	7.6 km (4.72 mi) in Canada 5.63 km (3.50 mi) in Minnesota	0.630 km (0.39 mi) in Canada 0.550 km (0.34 mi) in Minnesota			Significant tree damage through a heavily forested area	This tornado crossed Rainy Lake from Minnesota	One EF1 downburst was confirmed over Bare Island along the northern shores of Rainy Lake; Two additional EF1 tornadoes occurred in Minnesota; One additional unrated waterspout occurred in Minnesota
2019, July 26	East of Sapawe	EF1	1.9 km (1.18 mi)	0.350 km (0.22 mi)			Significant tree damage through a heavily forested area	This tornado dissipated west of Kawene before the storm later produced an EF1 downburst south of Kawene	
2019, September 11	Southeast of Petrolia	EF1	4.5 km (2.80 mi)	0.200 km (0.12 mi)			Structural and tree damage; Destroyed barn & farm outbuildings	One EF1 downburst occurred from north of Petrolia to south of Sutorville as the tornado touched down	

=== 2020s ===
Date	Location of impact(s)	Strength	Maximum Length	Maximum Width	Death	Injuries	Damage	Notes	Event Notes
==== 2020 ====
2020, June 8	Brooks Lake; Lawrence Lake	EF2	31.7 km (19.70 mi)	2.440 km (1.52 mi)			Significant tree damage through a heavily forested area	Treefall patterns indicate that the intensity may have been higher than an EF2; An additional 33 microbursts were confirmed along the sides of the tornado track	
2020, June 10	West of Belgrave	EF0	5.5 km (3.42 mi)	0.300 km (0.19 mi)			Weak structural and tree damage	This tornado dissipated near Belgrave before the storm produced another EF0 north of Brussels later in the day	Unclassified EF0 tree damage was confirmed in Kingsbridge before the storm produced two EF0 tornadoes near Belgrave and Brussels; A photo of a possible, but unconfirmed, waterspout was reported south of Tobermory over Lake Huron; One EF0 downburst was confirmed in Windsor; One EF1 downburst was confirmed near Canisbay Lake
2020, June 10	North of Brussels	EF0	3.1 km (1.93 mi)	0.150 km (0.09 mi)			Weak tree damage	This tornado developed from the same storm that produced an EF0 tornado earlier in the day west of Belgrave	Unclassified EF0 tree damage was confirmed in Kingsbridge before the storm produced two EF0 tornadoes near Belgrave and Brussels; A photo of a possible, but unconfirmed, waterspout was reported south of Tobermory over Lake Huron; One EF0 downburst was confirmed in Windsor; One EF1 downburst was confirmed near Canisbay Lake
2020, June 10	North of Newbury; South of Glencoe; Stratburn	EF0	15.7 km (9.76 mi)	0.150 km (0.09 mi)			Tree damage; Weak damage to roofs and siding	This tornado dissipated near Strathburn before the storm produced another two EF1 tornadoes near Belmont and Avon later in the day	Unclassified EF0 tree damage was confirmed in Kingsbridge before the storm produced two EF0 tornadoes near Belgrave and Brussels; A photo of a possible, but unconfirmed, waterspout was reported south of Tobermory over Lake Huron; One EF0 downburst was confirmed in Windsor; One EF1 downburst was confirmed near Canisbay Lake
2020, June 10	Near Mordolphin	EF1	1.62 km (1.01 mi)	0.080 km (0.05 mi)			Significant tree damage through a heavily forested area	One EF0 downburst occurred in both Port McNicoll and Victoria Harbour as the tornado touched down	Unclassified EF0 tree damage was confirmed in Kingsbridge before the storm produced two EF0 tornadoes near Belgrave and Brussels; A photo of a possible, but unconfirmed, waterspout was reported south of Tobermory over Lake Huron; One EF0 downburst was confirmed in Windsor; One EF1 downburst was confirmed near Canisbay Lake
2020, June 10	Eilean Gowan Island; Bangor Lodge; Bracebridge	EF1	5.6 km (3.48 mi)	0.120 km (0.07 mi)			Significant tree damage through a heavily forested area; Structural damage	This tornado dissipated near Bracebridge before the storm produced another EF1 tornado near Baysville and unclassified EF1 tree damage near West Buck Lake later in the day	Unclassified EF0 tree damage was confirmed in Kingsbridge before the storm produced two EF0 tornadoes near Belgrave and Brussels; A photo of a possible, but unconfirmed, waterspout was reported south of Tobermory over Lake Huron; One EF0 downburst was confirmed in Windsor; One EF1 downburst was confirmed near Canisbay Lake
2020, June 10	South of Baysville; Dickie Lake	EF1	5.6 km (3.48 mi)	0.140 km (0.09 mi)			Significant tree damage through a heavily forested area	This tornado developed from the same storm that produced an EF1 tornado earlier in the day near Bracebridge; Unclassified EF1 tree damage was confirmed near West Buck Lake at the time the tornado touched down from the same storm	Unclassified EF0 tree damage was confirmed in Kingsbridge before the storm produced two EF0 tornadoes near Belgrave and Brussels; A photo of a possible, but unconfirmed, waterspout was reported south of Tobermory over Lake Huron; One EF0 downburst was confirmed in Windsor; One EF1 downburst was confirmed near Canisbay Lake
2020, June 10	Near Belmont; South of Mossley	EF1	17.4 km (10.81 mi)	0.250 km (0.16 mi)			Tree and crop damage; Destroyed shed and damaged farm buildings	This tornado developed from the same storm that produced an EF0 tornado earlier in the day near Newbury; An EF1 tornado developed from the same storm very soon after this tornado touched down near Avon	Unclassified EF0 tree damage was confirmed in Kingsbridge before the storm produced two EF0 tornadoes near Belgrave and Brussels; A photo of a possible, but unconfirmed, waterspout was reported south of Tobermory over Lake Huron; One EF0 downburst was confirmed in Windsor; One EF1 downburst was confirmed near Canisbay Lake
2020, June 10	West of Avon	EF1	5.5 km (3.42 mi)	0.100 km (0.06 mi)			Structural and tree damage	This tornado developed from the same storm that produced an EF0 tornado earlier in the day near Newbury; An EF1 tornado near Belmont developed from the same storm shortly before this tornado touched down	Unclassified EF0 tree damage was confirmed in Kingsbridge before the storm produced two EF0 tornadoes near Belgrave and Brussels; A photo of a possible, but unconfirmed, waterspout was reported south of Tobermory over Lake Huron; One EF0 downburst was confirmed in Windsor; One EF1 downburst was confirmed near Canisbay Lake
2020, June 10	Crow Bay (Algonquin); Lake Lavieille	EF1	11.4 km (7.08 mi)	0.460 km (0.29 mi)			Significant tree damage through a heavily forested area		Unclassified EF0 tree damage was confirmed in Kingsbridge before the storm produced two EF0 tornadoes near Belgrave and Brussels; A photo of a possible, but unconfirmed, waterspout was reported south of Tobermory over Lake Huron; One EF0 downburst was confirmed in Windsor; One EF1 downburst was confirmed near Canisbay Lake
2020, June 10	Mary Lake; North Portage; South Portage; North of Dwight	EF2	23.0 km (14.29 mi)	0.710 km (0.44 mi)			Significant tree damage through a heavily forested area		Unclassified EF0 tree damage was confirmed in Kingsbridge before the storm produced two EF0 tornadoes near Belgrave and Brussels; A photo of a possible, but unconfirmed, waterspout was reported south of Tobermory over Lake Huron; One EF0 downburst was confirmed in Windsor; One EF1 downburst was confirmed near Canisbay Lake
2020, June 19	Northeast of Staples	EF0					No reported damage	This was a landspout tornado	An additional funnel cloud was reported in Thamesford
2020, June 23	Sturgeon Lake; Sturgeon Point	EF1	3.50 km (2.17 mi)	0.090 km (0.06 mi)			Destroyed boat dock; Tree damage	This tornado likely started over Sturgeon Lake	
2020, June 30	North of Kerwood; Near Dejong	EF0					No reported damage	This was a landspout tornado	
2020, July 10	Milton	EF0					No reported damage	Unclassified EF0 tree damage was confirmed in Hamilton Beach shortly after the tornado touched down	One EF0 downburst was confirmed near both Greenway and Crediton; One EF1 downburst was confirmed near Hawkesbury
2020, July 11	Lake Nipissing	EF0					No reported damage		Additional funnel clouds were reported in Niagara Falls, Centretown and south of Brighton over Lake Ontario
2020, July 13	Stout Lake	EF2	13.4 km (8.33 mi)	0.550 km (0.34 mi)			Significant tree damage through a heavily forested area		
2020, July 16	West of Brantford	EF0					No reported damage		
2020, July 19	Southeast of Kettle Point	EF0	1.07 km (0.66 mi)	0.040 km (0.02 mi)			Crop damage	An EF1 tornado touched down to the south near Kinnaird at the same time this tornado touched down; Unclassified EF0 crop damage was confirmed further east of the end of the damage track	An EF0 waterspout was confirmed north of Brights Grove over Lake Huron; An additional EF0 downburst, EF1 tornado, and EF2 tornado were all confirmed in Quebec; Several EF0 downbursts occurred across Southwestern Ontario including from Molesworth to Arthur, in Bayfield, in Exeter, in Kirkton, from Avonbank to Tavistock, in Cambridge, in Watford, in Norwich, in Stoney Point and in North Bay.; Two areas of unclassified EF0 damage were also confirmed in Wiarton and Chatsworth.
2020, July 19	Near Dublin	EF0	6.4 km (3.98 mi)	0.050 km (0.03 mi)			Significant crop damage	This tornado dissipated northeast of Dublin before the storm produced an EF1 tornado north of Gads Hill later in the day	An EF0 waterspout was confirmed north of Brights Grove over Lake Huron; An additional EF0 downburst, EF1 tornado, and EF2 tornado were all confirmed in Quebec; Several EF0 downbursts occurred across Southwestern Ontario including from Molesworth to Arthur, in Bayfield, in Exeter, in Kirkton, from Avonbank to Tavistock, in Cambridge, in Watford, in Norwich, in Stoney Point and in North Bay.; Two areas of unclassified EF0 damage were also confirmed in Wiarton and Chatsworth.
2020, July 19	Southeast of London; Belmont	EF0	9.27 km (5.76 mi)	0.090 km (0.06 mi)			Tree and crop damage; Weak siding, shingle, and window damage to homes	This tornado developed from the same storm that produced an EF1 tornado earlier in the day near Kinnaird; Unclassified EF0 tree damage was confirmed further west of the start of the damage track in London	An EF0 waterspout was confirmed north of Brights Grove over Lake Huron; An additional EF0 downburst, EF1 tornado, and EF2 tornado were all confirmed in Quebec; Several EF0 downbursts occurred across Southwestern Ontario including from Molesworth to Arthur, in Bayfield, in Exeter, in Kirkton, from Avonbank to Tavistock, in Cambridge, in Watford, in Norwich, in Stoney Point and in North Bay.; Two areas of unclassified EF0 damage were also confirmed in Wiarton and Chatsworth.
2020, July 19	Near Kinnaird; Near Jura; North of Arkona	EF1	15.5 km (9.63 mi)	0.160 km (0.10 mi)			Tree and crop damage; Destroyed barn roof & partial walls	This tornado dissipated northeast of Arkona before the storm produced an EF0 tornado near Belmont later in the day; An EF0 tornado touched down to the north near Kettle Point at the same time this tornado touched down; Unclassified EF0 tree damage was confirmed further east of the end of the damage track in Ailsa Craig	An EF0 waterspout was confirmed north of Brights Grove over Lake Huron; An additional EF0 downburst, EF1 tornado, and EF2 tornado were all confirmed in Quebec; Several EF0 downbursts occurred across Southwestern Ontario including from Molesworth to Arthur, in Bayfield, in Exeter, in Kirkton, from Avonbank to Tavistock, in Cambridge, in Watford, in Norwich, in Stoney Point and in North Bay.; Two areas of unclassified EF0 damage were also confirmed in Wiarton and Chatsworth.
2020, July 19	North of Blyth	EF1	8.64 km (5.37 mi)	0.050 km (0.03 mi)			Significant crop damage; Minor tree damage; Destroyed shed	One EF0 downburst occurred south of Brussels just after the tornado lifted	An EF0 waterspout was confirmed north of Brights Grove over Lake Huron; An additional EF0 downburst, EF1 tornado, and EF2 tornado were all confirmed in Quebec; Several EF0 downbursts occurred across Southwestern Ontario including from Molesworth to Arthur, in Bayfield, in Exeter, in Kirkton, from Avonbank to Tavistock, in Cambridge, in Watford, in Norwich, in Stoney Point and in North Bay.; Two areas of unclassified EF0 damage were also confirmed in Wiarton and Chatsworth.
2020, July 19	South of Centralia	EF1	2.55 km (1.58 mi)	0.200 km (0.12 mi)			Significant tree damage; Crop damage; Destroyed barn roof; Tossed, bent, and twisted grain bins	This tornado dissipated southeast of Centralia before the storm produced another EF1 tornado near Beachville later in the day; A large EF0 downburst occurred around this tornado and damaged parts of Mount Carmel, Lucan and Granton; Unclassified EF0 crop damage was confirmed further west of the start of the damage track towards an area west of Crediton	An EF0 waterspout was confirmed north of Brights Grove over Lake Huron; An additional EF0 downburst, EF1 tornado, and EF2 tornado were all confirmed in Quebec; Several EF0 downbursts occurred across Southwestern Ontario including from Molesworth to Arthur, in Bayfield, in Exeter, in Kirkton, from Avonbank to Tavistock, in Cambridge, in Watford, in Norwich, in Stoney Point and in North Bay.; Two areas of unclassified EF0 damage were also confirmed in Wiarton and Chatsworth.
2020, July 19	North of Gads Hill	EF1	3.87 km (2.40 mi)	0.260 km (0.16 mi)	~3 cows		Tree and crop damage; Destroyed barn	This tornado developed from the same storm that produced an EF0 tornado earlier in the day near Dublin	An EF0 waterspout was confirmed north of Brights Grove over Lake Huron; An additional EF0 downburst, EF1 tornado, and EF2 tornado were all confirmed in Quebec; Several EF0 downbursts occurred across Southwestern Ontario including from Molesworth to Arthur, in Bayfield, in Exeter, in Kirkton, from Avonbank to Tavistock, in Cambridge, in Watford, in Norwich, in Stoney Point and in North Bay.; Two areas of unclassified EF0 damage were also confirmed in Wiarton and Chatsworth.
2020, July 19	North of Beachville	EF1	2.88 km (1.79 mi)	0.100 km (0.06 mi)			Tree damage; Damaged roof material; Crop damage	This tornado developed from the same storm that produced an EF1 tornado earlier in the day south of Centralia; Unclassified EF0 structural damage was confirmed further east of the end of the damage track in Woodstock and Bond's Corners	An EF0 waterspout was confirmed north of Brights Grove over Lake Huron; An additional EF0 downburst, EF1 tornado, and EF2 tornado were all confirmed in Quebec; Several EF0 downbursts occurred across Southwestern Ontario including from Molesworth to Arthur, in Bayfield, in Exeter, in Kirkton, from Avonbank to Tavistock, in Cambridge, in Watford, in Norwich, in Stoney Point and in North Bay.; Two areas of unclassified EF0 damage were also confirmed in Wiarton and Chatsworth.
2020, July 19	South of Eden Mills	EF1	1.17 km (0.73 mi)	0.070 km (0.04 mi)			Structural and tree damage		An EF0 waterspout was confirmed north of Brights Grove over Lake Huron; An additional EF0 downburst, EF1 tornado, and EF2 tornado were all confirmed in Quebec; Several EF0 downbursts occurred across Southwestern Ontario including from Molesworth to Arthur, in Bayfield, in Exeter, in Kirkton, from Avonbank to Tavistock, in Cambridge, in Watford, in Norwich, in Stoney Point and in North Bay.; Two areas of unclassified EF0 damage were also confirmed in Wiarton and Chatsworth.
2020, August 2	Southwest of Oxford Mills	EF0	0.3 km (0.19 mi)	0.020 km (0.01 mi)			Weak tree and crop damage	This tornado developed from the same storm that produced an EF1 tornado earlier in the day through Camden East	An additional funnel cloud was reported in Little Current
2020, August 2	Camden East	EF1	2.5 km (1.55 mi)	0.110 km (0.07 mi)			Structural and tree damage	This tornado dissipated northeast of Camden East before the storm produced an EF0 tornado southwest of Oxford Mills later in the day	An additional funnel cloud was reported in Little Current
2020, August 2	North of Bexley	EF1	4.9 km (3.04 mi)	0.270 km (0.17 mi)			Significant tree damage through a heavily forested area	This tornado dissipated northeast of Bexley before the storm produced an EF2 tornado through Kinmount later in the day	An additional funnel cloud was reported in Little Current
2020, August 2	Kinmount	EF2	2.0 km (1.24 mi)	0.270 km (0.17 mi)			Significant tree damage through a heavily forested area; Structural damage	This tornado developed from the same storm that produced an EF1 tornado earlier in the day north of Bexley	An additional funnel cloud was reported in Little Current
2020, August 4	Palmerston	EF0	1.11 km (0.69 mi)	0.200 km (0.12 mi)			Weak tree damage	Initial review of the damage could not rule out a gustnado as a possible cause of the weak damage occurring over a relatively short distance	Additional funnel clouds were reported in Kleinburg, Oakville, Hamilton and Jarvis; An EF0 downburst was confirmed in Burlington; An EF0 waterspout was confirmed south of Port Colborne over Lake Erie
2020, August 16	Southwest of Kent-Bridge	EF0					No reported damage	This was a landspout tornado	An additional funnel cloud was reported in Harrow; An EF0 waterspout was confirmed west of Point Clark over Lake Huron
2020, August 27	East of Mount Carmel	EF1	7.16 km (4.45 mi)	0.100 km (0.06 mi)			Tree and crop damage; Destroyed barn		An additional funnel cloud was reported south of St. Thomas; Three EF0 downbursts were confirmed in London, from an area south of Thamesford to Banner and southwest of Burford
2020, August 27	East of Union; East of Dexter	EF1	5.07 km (3.15 mi)	0.150 km (0.09 mi)			Tree and crop damage; Damage farm outbuildings		An additional funnel cloud was reported south of St. Thomas; Three EF0 downbursts were confirmed in London, from an area south of Thamesford to Banner and southwest of Burford
2020, August 28	Point Clark	EF0	0.29 km (0.18 mi)	0.080 km (0.05 mi)			Tree damage		
2020, September 3	Port Colborne	EF0	1.05 km (0.65 mi)	0.050 km (0.03 mi)			Weak structural and tree damage		
2020, September 3	Northeast of Washago; Southeast of Severn Bridge	EF1	1.81 km (1.12 mi)	0.090 km (0.06 mi)			Tree damage	One EF0 downburst occurred northwest of Severn Bridge just before the tornado touched down	
2020, September 13	Near Pembroke; Allumette Island	EF1	9.8 km (6.09 mi)	0.180 km (0.11 mi)			Significant tree damage through a heavily forested area; Minor structural damage	This tornado crossed the Ottawa River into Quebec	
2020, September 30	Southwest of Strabane	EF1	0.67 km (0.42 mi)	0.110 km (0.07 mi)			Shifted barn roof; Destroyed barn and shed; Tree and crop damage		An additional funnel cloud was reported south of Bondhead over Lake Ontario; One EF0 waterspout was confirmed on Lake Erie, south of Long Point; Two EF0 waterspouts were confirmed on Lake Ontario, one north of Vineland and one south of Brighton
2020, October 23	Thornbury; Clarksburg	EF0	3.15 km (1.96 mi)	0.050 km (0.03 mi)			Minor tree damage	This tornado crossed into and dissipated on Georgian Bay	Unclassified EF0 tree damage was confirmed in Baysville
2020, November 15	Georgetown	EF1	3.63 km (2.26 mi)	0.360 km (0.22 mi)			Structural and tree damage		Unclassified EF0 roof damage was confirmed in Waterford; Three EF0 downbursts were confirmed from New Dundee to Ayr, Port Burwell and in Dunneville; One EF1 downburst was confirmed from Ingersoll to Salford
==== 2021 ====
2021, May 25	Little Antler Lake	EF2	33.4 km (20.75 mi)	0.260 km (0.16 mi)			Significant tree damage through a heavily forested area		An under-review damage path was found near Gogama; Three additional EF2 tornadoes occurred in Quebec
2021, June 26	Northwest of Lucknow	EF0					No reported damage		
2021, June 26	North of Maynooth	EF1	2.30 km (1.43 mi)	0.180 km (0.11 mi)			Tree damage through a heavily forested area; Snapped power poles		
2021, June 26	Massie; Strathavon; Walter's Falls	EF2	13.5 km (8.39 mi)	0.400 km (0.25 mi)			Significant tree damage through a heavily forested area; Collapsed chimney; Significant roof damage; Destroyed farm building		
2021, July 13	Penetanguishene	EF0	2.5 km (1.55 mi)	0.300 km (0.19 mi)			Tree damage		One EF0 downburst was confirmed in Tasso Lake; Two additional EF0 downbursts were confirmed in Quebec; Two additional EF1 tornadoes occurred in Quebec
2021, July 13	Northeast of Beachburg; Sullivan Island	EF1	6.94 km (4.31 mi)	1.460 km (0.91 mi)			Significant tree damage through a heavily forested area	This tornado crossed the Ottawa River into Quebec	One EF0 downburst was confirmed in Tasso Lake; Two additional EF0 downbursts were confirmed in Quebec; Two additional EF1 tornadoes occurred in Quebec
2021, July 15	Southwest of Vallentyne; South of Sunderland	EF1	9.5 km (5.90 mi)	0.140 km (0.09 mi)			Tree, crop & structural damage	This tornado developed alongside two EF2 tornadoes near Udora and Sonya	One additional EF1 tornado occurred in Quebec
2021, July 15	Stewart Crossing	EF1	5.66 km (3.52 mi)	0.140 km (0.09 mi)			Significant tree damage through a heavily forested area		One additional EF1 tornado occurred in Quebec
2021, July 15	Barrie; Sandy Cove Acres; Innisfil	EF2	12.46 km (7.74 mi)	0.510 km (0.32 mi)		~11	Significant structural damage including various uninhabitable homes; Tree damage; Tossed and destroyed vehicles	This tornado dissipated over Lake Simcoe before the storm produced another EF2 near Lorneville later in the day; Estimated insured losses are $83.698 million	One additional EF1 tornado occurred in Quebec
2021, July 15	North of Zephyr; South of Udora	EF2	11.8 km (7.33 mi)	0.350 km (0.22 mi)			Structural damage; Tree & crop damage	This tornado developed alongside an EF2 tornado near Sonya and an EF1 tornado near Sunderland	One additional EF1 tornado occurred in Quebec
2021, July 15	Near Lorneville; North of Grasshill; Hartley	EF2	13.0 km (8.08 mi)	0.600 km (0.37 mi)			Destroyed barn & farm outbuilding; Tree & crop damage	This tornado developed from the same storm that produced an EF2 tornado earlier in the day in Barrie	One additional EF1 tornado occurred in Quebec
2021, July 15	North of Sonya; South of Salem Corners; West of Little Britain	EF2	6.73 km (4.18 mi)	0.270 km (0.17 mi)		~1	Structural damage; Tree & crop damage	This tornado developed alongside an EF2 tornado near Udora and an EF1 tornado near Sunderland	One additional EF1 tornado occurred in Quebec
2021, July 15	Near North Portage	EF2	4.76 km (2.96 mi)	0.360 km (0.22 mi)			Significant tree damage through a heavily forested area		One additional EF1 tornado occurred in Quebec
2021, July 15	Near Sunbeam Lake; Southworth Lake	EF2	7.14 km (4.44 mi)	0.320 km (0.20 mi)		~2	Significant tree damage through a heavily forested area		One additional EF1 tornado occurred in Quebec
2021, July 15	Near Lake Traverse	EF2	11.9 km (7.39 mi)	0.340 km (0.21 mi)			Significant tree damage through a heavily forested area		One additional EF1 tornado occurred in Quebec
2021, July 20	Whitestone Lake	EF0	2.42 km (1.50 mi)	0.100 km (0.06 mi)			Weak tree damage	One EF1 downburst occurred near Canning Lake just before the tornado touched down	
2021, July 24	Thornbury	EF0	1.04 km (0.65 mi)	0.090 km (0.06 mi)			Weak tree damage; Minor structural damage	One EF0 downburst occurred near Clarksburg just before the tornado touched down	
2021, July 24	East of Bayfield	EF0					Weak tree damage		
2021, July 24	Windsor	EF0	2.37 km (1.47 mi)	0.350 km (0.22 mi)			Weak tree damage; Minor roof damage to various houses	This tornado dissipated in Windsor before the storm later produced an EF1 tornado in Leamington	
2021, July 24	Leamington	EF1	2.48 km (1.54 mi)	0.190 km (0.12 mi)			Tree damage; Shattered greenhouse glass panels	This tornado developed from the same storm that produced an EF0 tornado earlier in the day in Windsor	
2021, August 10	Northeast of London; London Airport	EF0	4.30 km (2.67 mi)	0.020 km (0.01 mi)			Weak tree damage		
2021, August 11	Urquhart Lake	EF1	9.24 km (5.74 mi)	0.750 km (0.47 mi)			Significant tree damage through a heavily forested area	All the tornadoes on this day occurred from the same complex of storms	Under-review damage paths were found near; Campover Lake; Elliot Lake; Mather's Lake; Franklin Lake; Basswood Lake; St. Joseph Island
2021, August 11	Dunns Valley; Wharncliffe	EF2	9.93 km (6.17 mi)	0.820 km (0.51 mi)			Significant tree damage through a heavily forested area	All the tornadoes on this day occurred from the same complex of storms	Under-review damage paths were found near; Campover Lake; Elliot Lake; Mather's Lake; Franklin Lake; Basswood Lake; St. Joseph Island
2021, August 11	Kynoch	EF2	8.41 km (5.23 mi)	0.780 km (0.48 mi)			Significant tree damage through a heavily forested area	All the tornadoes on this day occurred from the same complex of storms	Under-review damage paths were found near; Campover Lake; Elliot Lake; Mather's Lake; Franklin Lake; Basswood Lake; St. Joseph Island
2021, August 11	Blinko Lake	EF2	3.92 km (2.44 mi)	0.430 km (0.27 mi)			Significant tree damage through a heavily forested area	All the tornadoes on this day occurred from the same complex of storms	Under-review damage paths were found near; Campover Lake; Elliot Lake; Mather's Lake; Franklin Lake; Basswood Lake; St. Joseph Island
2021, August 26	Near McKay's Corners	EF0					No reported damage	This was a landspout tornado	
2021, August 29	Aubrey Lake	EF1	7.75 km (4.82 mi)	0.180 km (0.11 mi)			Significant tree damage through a heavily forested area	Unclassified EF1 tree damage was confirmed further west of the start of the damage track towards Rocky Island Lake	An EF1 downburst was confirmed on Sugarloaf Island in Anima Nipissing Lake; Unclassified EF1 tree damage was confirmed south of Latchford; Two additional EF1 tornadoes occurred in Quebec
2021, August 29	Dowling	EF1	2.05 km (1.27 mi)	0.150 km (0.09 mi)			Significant tree damage through a heavily forested area; Structural damage		An EF1 downburst was confirmed on Sugarloaf Island in Anima Nipissing Lake; Unclassified EF1 tree damage was confirmed south of Latchford; Two additional EF1 tornadoes occurred in Quebec
2021, September 6	Port Albert	EF0	2.30 km (1.43 mi)	0.175 km (0.11 mi)			Tree damage; Tossed patio furniture	This tornado occurred at a 'rare' time - 4:05 AM local time	
2021, September 7	South of Goderich; North of Summerhill	EF0	12.8 km (7.95 mi)	0.250 km (0.16 mi)			Weak tree damage	This tornado dissipated north of Summerhill before the storm later produced another EF0 tornado near Kuhryville	An EF0 downburst was confirmed in Port Elgin; An EF1 downburst was confirmed in Southampton
2021, September 7	North of Kuhryville; West of Brunner	EF0	2.89 km (1.80 mi)	0.060 km (0.04 mi)			Weak tree damage; Crop damage	This tornado developed from the same storm that produced an EF0 tornado earlier in the day south of Goderich	An EF0 downburst was confirmed in Port Elgin; An EF1 downburst was confirmed in Southampton
2021, September 7	Southeast of King City in Vaughan	EF0	0.750 km (0.47 mi)	0.080 km (0.05 mi)			Weak tree damage; Crop damage	This tornado developed from the same storm that produced two EF2 tornadoes earlier in the day near Kingsbridge and Harriston	An EF0 downburst was confirmed in Port Elgin; An EF1 downburst was confirmed in Southampton
2021, September 7	Kingsbridge; Lanes; Zion; Lucknow	EF2	19.0 km (11.81 mi) over land; 20.0 km (12.43 mi) over Lake Huron	1.30 km (0.81 mi)			Significant tree & crop damage; Significant structural damage to homes, barns, and silos; Complete destruction of numerous farm buildings	Four EF0-strength waterspouts were recorded over Lake Huron surrounding this tornado; The tornado was strongest over Lake Huron; This tornado dissipated southeast of Lucknow before the storm later produced another EF2 tornado near Harriston and an EF0 tornado in Vaughan	An EF0 downburst was confirmed in Port Elgin; An EF1 downburst was confirmed in Southampton
2021, September 7	Southeast of Harriston; Wagram; Southeast of Kenilworth	EF2	26.4 km (16.40 mi)	1.20 km (0.75 mi)			Significant tree & crop damage; Significant structural damage to homes, barns, and silos	This tornado developed from the same storm that produced an EF2 tornado earlier in the day near Kingsbridge; This tornado dissipated southeast of Kenilworth before the storm later produced an EF0 tornado in Vaughan	An EF0 downburst was confirmed in Port Elgin; An EF1 downburst was confirmed in Southampton
2021, September 12	North of Sylvan; Parkhill	EF1	6.96 km (4.32 mi)	0.300 km (0.19 mi)			Tree damage; A shed lost part of the roof		An EF0 downburst was confirmed near Belmont; An EF1 downburst was confirmed near Ailsa Craig

=== Summary of Ontario tornado strengths per year ===
Year	Total	Not rated	F0 (EF0)	F1 (EF1)	F2 (EF2)	F3 (EF3)	F4 (EF4)	F5 (EF5)
Process of converting previous years into the new format ^
1792	1	1	0	0	0	0	0	0
1829	3	3	0	0	0	0	0	0
1860	1	1	0	0	0	0	0	0
1880	1	1	0	0	0	0	0	0
1884	1	0	0	0	0	0	1	0
1885	1	1	0	0	0	0	0	0
1888	2	2	0	0	0	0	0	0
1892	1	1	0	0	0	0	0	0
1898	1	1	0	0	0	0	0	0
1902	1	0	0	0	0	0	1	0
1923	1	1	0	0	0	0	0	0
1946	3	0	0	0	1	1	1	0
1948	1	1	0	0	0	0	0	0
1953	1	0	0	0	0	0	1	0
1967	2	0	1	0	0	1	0	0
1970	1	0	0	0	0	1	0	0
1972	1	1	0	0	0	0	0	0
1973	2	2	0	0	0	0	0	0
1974	1	0	0	0	0	1	0	0
1979	2	0	1	0	0	0	1	0
1980	16	0	9	5	2	1	0	0
1981	12	0	9	3	0	0	0	0
1982	9	0	6	3	0	0	0	0
1983	3	0	1	0	1	0	1	0
1984	3	3	0	0	0	0	0	0
1985	9	2	1	2	1	1	2	0
1986	2	1	0	0	0	1	0	0
1987	1	0	0	1	0	0	0	0
1988	1	0	0	0	1	0	0	0
1990	3	0	0	1	1	1	0	0
1991	1	1	0	0	0	0	0	0
1994	1	1	0	0	0	0	0	0
1995	3	2	0	0	1	0	0	0
1996	2	1	0	0	0	1	0	0
1997	1	0	0	1	0	0	0	0
1998	1	0	0	1	0	0	0	0
1999	1	0	0	0	1	0	0	0
2000	9	1	2	4	2	0	0	0
2001	3	0	2	1	0	0	0	0
2002	3	3	0	0	0	0	0	0
2004	4	0	0	2	1	1	0	0
2005	3	0	0	2	1	0	0	0
2006	5	0	2	2	1	0	0	0
2007	0	1	2	0	0	0	0	0
2008	6	1	3	2	0	0	0	0
2009	15	1	6	5	3	0	0	0
2010	6	1	1	3	1	0	0	0
2011	10	0	4	4	1	1	0	0
2012	8	0	6	1	1	0	0	0
2013	17	0	12	4	1	0	0	0
2014	17	0	9	7	1	0	0	0
2015	6	0	2	2	2	0	0	0
2016	10	0	5	4	1	0	0	0
2017	10	2	3	2	3	0	0	0
2018	23	0	10	7	5	1	0	0
2019	13	0	4	8	1	0	0	0
2020	42	0	17	21	4	5	1	0
2021	35	0	12	9	14	0	0	0

== Prince Edward Island ==
=== List of Prince Edward Island tornadoes ===
==== 1980s ====
Date	Location of impact(s)	Strength	Maximum Length	Maximum Width	Death	Injuries	Damage	Notes	Event Notes
===== 1980 =====
1980, August 15	East of Green Bay; Near Tyrone; North Wiltshire	F0	4.63 km (2.88 mi)						
1980, September 28	Cape Traverse	F0					Weak structural damage		
===== 1982 =====
1982, September 10	Wilmot	F0							

==== 2000s ====
Date	Location of impact(s)	Strength	Maximum Length	Maximum Width	Death	Injuries	Damage	Notes	Event Notes
===== 2007 =====
2007, August 19	Crapaud	F0							

==== 2020s ====
Date	Location of impact(s)	Strength	Maximum Length	Maximum Width	Death	Injuries	Damage	Notes	Event Notes
===== 2026 =====
2026, July 11	Between Belfast and Orwell	EF0							

=== Summary of Prince Edward Island tornado strengths per year ===
Year	Total	Not rated	F0 (EF0)	F1 (EF1)	F2 (EF2)	F3 (EF3)	F4 (EF4)	F5 (EF5)
1980	2	0	2	0	0	0	0	0
1982	1	0	1	0	0	0	0	0
2007	1	0	1	0	0	0	0	0
2026	1	0	1	0	0	0	0	0
1980-2020 yearly average	0.1	0	0.1	0	0	0	0	0

== Quebec ==
Date	Location of impact(s)	Strength	Death	Injuries	Damage	Other notes
=== 1870 ===
1870, July 16	Montreal	Not rated	~1		Everything in the path of the tornado	
=== 1872 ===
1872, July 3	Saint-Stanislas	F3	~2	Several	Eleven structures were completely destroyed including three homes; A house containing eleven people exploded outwards, critically injuring them.	A tornado was mentioned in the Montreal Gazette.
=== 1888 ===
1888, June 6	Ontario to Montreal	Not rated	~3		Destroyed houses; Destroyed barns; Destroyed outbuildings	Tornado passed from Cornwall to Montreal
1888, August 16	Saint-Zotique to Salaberry-de-Valleyfield	F4	~9	~16	Damaged property	Tornado passed from Ontario; Fifth deadliest tornado in Canadian history
=== 1892 ===
1892, June 14	Sainte-Rose	Not rated	~6	~21	Damaged property	Ninth deadliest tornado in Canadian history
=== 1923 ===
1923, August 19	Sainte-Cécile-de-Lévrard Warwick	Not rated			32 buildings damaged	Estimated at 100 000$
=== 1939 ===
1939, June 11	Saint-Jean-sur-Richelieu	Not rated			Damaged trees	
=== 1949 ===
1949, July 19	Chénéville	Not rated			Damaged some houses and tore the spire of a church	
=== 1975 ===
1975, July 24	Saint-Bonaventure	F3	~4	~60+	Destroyed over 100 homes and businesses	Strong tornado; Significant damage; Three deaths occurred in a mobile home
=== 1978 ===
1978, June 27	Buckingham Masson-Angers	F2		~35	Damaged over 100 homes and businesses	
=== 1980 ===
1980, August 8	Le Petit-Aigle	F2		~1		
1980, August 9	Roberval	F0				
=== 1982 ===
1982, April 14	Adamsville	F1				
=== 1984 ===
1984, July 15	Nichabau Cayamant Lac Blue Sea	F3	~1	~40	Around 80 damaged buildings, businesses and churches	
=== 1985 ===
1985, May 20	St Raphaël de Bellechasse	F0				
1985, June 18	Saint-Sylvère	F3		~3		
1985, July 6	Lacolle; Hemmingford	F1				
=== 1986 ===
1986, June 16	Lac Gareau	F3			Significant damage to some houses, vehicles and trees	Two unconfirmed tornadoes in the area as well
1986, June 24	Tingwick	Not rated			Damaged property	
1986, July 15	Maniwaki	F0	~1			
=== 1987 ===
1987, May 28	Glen-Sutton	F0				
1987, June 8	Fort-Coulonge	F1			Minor damage	
1987, July 26	Kinnear's Mills	F1				
=== 1989 ===
1989, November 16	Mont-Saint-Hilaire	F2			Estimated over C$2,000,000 of damage	Latest confirmed tornado in the province's history
=== 1991 ===
1991, June 12	Saint-Barnabé	F1				
1991, August 26	Louvicourt	F1				
1991, August 27	Pierreville Maskinongé	F3		~15	Estimated over C$25,000,000 of damage	60% of buildings in Maskinongé damaged; Two tornadoes
1991, August 27	Réserve Faunique Mastigouche Lac Némiscachingue	F2				Two tornadoes
=== 1992 ===
1992, May 17	Chichester	F0				
1992, August 2	Sainte-Élisabeth	F0				
=== 1993 ===
1993, July 3	Saint-Leonard	F0				
1993, July 20	Saint-Mathieu	F0				
1993, August 2	Lévis	F0				
1993, August 31	Wottonville	F1				
1993, September 3	Saint-Césaire	F1				
=== 1994 ===
1994, April 27	Saint-Janvier Lorraine	F1				
1994, May 22	St-Augustin, Quebec [clarification needed]	F0				
1994, May 31	Lac-à-la-Tortue	F2				
1994, May 31	Donnacona-Neuville; Saint-Nicolas	F1				Two tornadoes
1994, June 12	Saint-Cuthbert	F1				
1994, June 21	Parc-de-la-Mauricie	F0				
1994, July 9	Saint-Charles-sur-Richelieu	F2	~1	~3	Damaged houses	
1994, July 21	Lac-Saint-Louis	F0				
1994, July 26	Roxton Falls	F0				
1994, July 30	Franklin	F0				
1994, August 4	Aylmer	F3		~15	Major building damage	
1994, August 4	Laurel	F2				
1994, August 4	Rawdon	F1				
1994, August 28	L'Île-Perrot	F0				
=== 1995 ===
1995, July 20	Lac Newcomb	F0				
1995, July 21	Trois-Rivières	F0				
=== 1996 ===
1996, April 21	Ormstown	F0				
1996, July 11	Saint-Stanislas, Quebec [clarification needed]	F1				
1996, July 15	Elgin	F2				
1996, August 8	Saint-Jacques	F0				
1996, August 25	Saint-Bernard	F1				
=== 1997 ===
1997, June 25	Pointe-Fortune	F1				
1997, July 4	L'Ascension de Patapédia	==== F1 ====				
1997, July 4	Restigouche	F2			Destroyed barns	
1997, July 28	Mercier	F0				
1997, November 2	Lac-Etchemin	F0				
=== 1998 ===
1998, June 29	Lac Blue Sea	F0				
1998, June 29	Saint-Philibert	F1				
1998, July 11	Lac-Sergent	F0				
1998, July 20	Landrienne	F1				
1998, July 27	Lac Parent	F0				
1998, August 11	Sainte-Catherine-de-la-Jacques-Cartier	F0				
1998, August 11	Saint-Émile	F1			Citywide power outages; Damaged shed	
1998, August 15	Lac Cole	F0				
1998, September 27	Chicoutimi	F0				
=== 1999 ===
1999, May 8	Hull	F1		~6	Estimated C$2,000,000 of damage; Damaged roofs	
1999, May 25	Saint-Gabriel	F0				
1999, June 6	Sherrington	F0				
1999, June 8	Sainte-Marthe	F1				
1999, July 6	Notre-Dame-du-Mont-Carmel; Yamaska; Berthierville; Danville; Sainte-Catherine-de-Hatley	F0				Five tornadoes
1999, July 6	Drummondville	F1	~1	~4	Major building damage; Tree damage; Estimated C$12,400,000 of damage	
1999, September 20	Saint-Michel-des-Saints	F1				
=== 2000 ===
2000, June 22	Quyon	F0				
2000, July 18	Saint-Jean-Chrysostome	F0				
=== 2001 ===
2001, June 19	Pointe-Taillon National Park	F0			Tree damage	
2001, June 19	Alma	F2			Destroyed houses; Destroyed a barn; Destroyed a garage	
2001, July 1	Lac Saint-Jean	F1			Damaged home	
2001, July 4	Lac-des-Plages; Brébeuf	F1				Two tornadoes
2001, July 10	Saguenay	F0				
2001, August 4	Matagami	F1				
2001, August 9	Alma	F1				
=== 2002 ===
2002, May 31	Packington	F2			Damaged homes and outbuildings	
2002, July 4	Boileau	F1				
2002, July 14	Senneterre	F1				
2002, July 22	Saint-Frédéric, Québec	F1				
2002, August 18	Dolbeau	F1				
2002, September 3	Berry	F0				
=== 2003 ===
2003, June 11	Laval	F1			Tree damage; Warehouse damage	
2003, June 25	Ville-Marie	F0				
2003, June 27	Labrieville	F0				
2003, June 29	Fort William	F0				
2003, July 8	Sainte-Jeanne-d'Arc, Quebec	F0			Tree damage; Several buildings were damaged	
2003, July 27	Saint-Jean-Port-Joli	F0				
2003, July 27	Saint-Narcisse-de-Rimouski	F1				
2003, August 6	Roxton Pond	F0				
2003, September 4	Issoudun	F0				
2003, September 23	L'Assomption	F0				
=== 2004 ===
2004, June 8	Landrienne	F1				
2004, June 20	Laurier-Station; Saint-Elzéar	F0				Two tornadoes
2004, July 1	Lac-Gatineau	F0				
2004, July 31	Chesterville	F0				
2004, July 31	Châteauguay; Durham-Sud; Saint-Albert	F1				Three tornadoes
2004, August 10	Thurso	F1			Tree damage	
2004, September 3	Malartic	F0				
=== 2005 ===
2005, June 6	Gatineau	F0				
2005, June 25	Verchères	F1				
2005, July 1	Saint-Ambroise-de-Kildare	F0				
2005, August 16	Réservoir Opinaca	F0				
2005, September 30	Havre-aux-Maisons	F2				
=== 2006 ===
2006, June 29	L'Anse-Saint-Jean	F0				
2006, July 17	Ferme-Neuve	F1			Damaged trees; Moved RVs	
2006, July 25	Lac Saint-Jean	F0			Estimated C$2,000,000 of damage; Destroyed a barn	
2006, August 1	Saint-Gédéon-de-Beauce	F1				
2006, August 1	Lac-Drolet	F2		~2	Some houses and vehicles damaged	
2006, August 22	Saint-Thomas	F0				
=== 2007 ===
2007, July 15	Lac Boivin	F0				
2007, August 12	La Tuque; Saint-Just-de-Bretenières	F0				Two tornadoes
2007, August 25	Beauceville	F0				
=== 2008 ===
2008, July 10	Saguenay	F1				
2008, July 23	Lanoraie	F0				Two waterspouts were also reported near Montreal
2008, August 11	Roberval	F0				
2008, September 8	Lac Gauthier	F0				
=== 2009 ===
2009, May 1	Normandin	F0		Damaged hydro poles		
2009 July 11	Sainte-Thérèse	F1			Damaged homes; Tree damage	
2009, July 11	Boisbriand	F1			Damaged homes; Tree damage	
2009, July 11	Mirabel	F0				
2009, July 27	Sainte-Christine	F0			Damaged a shed; Tree damage	
2009, July 29	Duberger	F0			Roof damage; Tree damage	
2009, August 4	Between Déléage and Mont-Laurier	F2		~2	Around 40 Homes damaged; Cars tossed; Hydro poles snapped; Tree damage; Estimated C$6,000,000 of damage	Two men died in a helicopter crash the next day while doing ground survey
2009, August 21	Baskatong Reservoir; La Tuque	F0			Tree damage	Two tornadoes
=== 2010 ===
2010, June 28	Sainte-Anne-de-Bellevue; Mascouche	F0				Additional funnel clouds were spotted; Two tornadoes
2010, July 16	Sainte-Anne-de-Bellevue	F0				
2010, July 17	Saint-Lazare	F0			Damaged homes; Tree damage	Lightning strikes two people
2010, September 2	Saint-Benoit-de-Mirabel	F0				
=== 2011 ===
2011, June 23	Aylmer	F0				
2011, July 20	Between Saguenay and Quebec City	F1				
2011, August 6	Sainte-Élisabeth-de-Proulx	F1			Damaged cottagges; Tree damage	An unconfirmed tornado in Saint-Ludger-de-Milot, Quebec
2011, September 4	Trois-Rivières	F0			Roof damage; Tree damage	
=== 2012 ===
2012, May 25	Brownsburg-Chatham	F0			Estimated C$millions of damage	
2012, May 25	Saint-Benoît	F1			Estimated C$millions of damage	
2012, June 8	Huntingdon	F1			Damaged a gas station; Tree damage	
2012, August 30	Chibougamau	F0			Tree damage	
2012, September 8	Drummondville	F0			Roof damage	
2012, October 31	Mont-Laurier	F0			Barn damage; Road signs blown over	
=== 2013 ===
2013, June 1	Saint-Hugues	EF0			Minor roof damage	
2013, July 11	Saint-Marc-des-Carrières	EF0				
2013, August 13	Sherbrooke	EF0			Roof damage; Broken windows	
2013, August 16	Cabano	EF0				Changed into a waterspout over Lake Témiscouata, Quebec
=== 2014 ===
2014, May 26	Roxton Falls	EF0			Roof damage	
2014, May 26	Laurierville	Not rated				
2014, June 30	Laforce	EF0			Tree damage	
2014, July 9	Sainte-Apolline-de-Patton; Lambton	EF1			Damaged homes	Two tornadoes
2014, July 9	Saint-Fabien-de-Panet	EF2			Tree damage	Rare nocturnal tornado
2014, July 31	Pont-Rouge	EF1			Roof damage; Tree damage; Damaged shed	
=== 2015 ===
2015, August 3	Saint-Zénon-du-Lac-Humqui, Quebec	EF0			Damaged farm; Destroyed a weak house; Tree damage	
=== 2016 ===
2016, June 2	Maniwaki	EF0			Tree damage; Damaged buildings	
2016, June 20	Lac Verne	EF2		~2	Destroyed a cottage; Tree damage	
2016, July 4	Métabetchouan–Lac-à-la-Croix	EF0			Damaged a farm; Tree damage	
2016, July 18	Roxton Falls	EF1			Tree damage; Destroyed a barn	
=== 2017 ===
2017, June 18	Mare-du-Sault	EF0			Tree damage	
2017, June 18	Rivière Beausejour; Lac-de-la-Boiteuse; Lac Noir; Manawan; Lac des Cornes	EF1			Tree damage	Eight tornadoes
2017, June 18	Hébertville; Lac Bachon; Lac Tom; Lac-de-la-Corneille	EF2			Damaged houses, barns and vehicles in Hébertville; Tree damage	Four tornadoes
2017, June 18	Sainte-Anne-du-Lac	EF3		~2	Destroyed two homes; One home stripped of its roof and walls leaving only its foundation	Biggest outbreak in Québec's history
2017, August 5	Saint-Joseph-de-Beauce	EF1			Destroyed buildings; Tree damage	
2017, August 22	Lachute	EF1			Damaged 150 homes	
2017, October 15	Mont-Laurier	EF0			Damaged 6 homes	
=== 2018 ===
2018, July 23	Lanaudière; Lake Deligny	EF0			Damaged trees; Overturned shed	Waterspout then tornado
2018, August 29	Saint-Julien, Quebec	EF2			Destroyed trees; Bent traffic signs; Destroyed mobile home	
2018, September 5	Nouveau-Siding Langlade Kanawata Lac Boulon Réserve Faunique des Laurentides	EF1			Damaged trees	Five tornadoes
2018, September 5	Barrière Lac Kean Réservoir Gouin Lac Hiya Lac Gus Lac Rouillé	EF2			Damaged trees	Six tornadoes
2018, September 6	Lac Adee	EF1			Damaged trees	
2018, September 6	Lac-aux-Perles Réserve Faunique des Laurentides	EF2			Damaged trees	Two tornadoes
2018, September 21	Aylmer Mont-Bleu Gatineau	EF3		~30	Destroyed and damaged trees; Destroyed multiple homes and damaged hundreds; Destroyed vehicles; Some homes swept off their foundations	Began in Kinburn, Ontario.; High-end and long-track; Damage estimated at $334 000 000 for the entirety of the outbreak
2018, September 21	Baskatong Reservoir; North of Otter Lake; Val-des-Bois	EF1			Destroyed and damaged trees; Damaged hydro poles; Destroyed and damaged houses	Three tornadoes
=== 2019 ===
2019, July 11	Parent	EF1			Tree damage	
2019, July 11	Saint-Roch-de-L'Achigan	EF1		~1	Damaged many caravans	
2019, July 29	Senneterre	EF1			Tree damage	
2019, July 30	Lac-aux-Sables	EF1		~3	Damaged many caravans	
2019, August 21	Baie-des-Chaloupes McTavish	EF1				Two tornadoes
2019, August 21	La tuque Rivière-Rouge	EF2				Two tornadoes
2019, August 21	Lacs-des-Écorces	EF2			Structural damage	
2019, September 4	Saint-Pierre-les-Becquets Sainte-Rose-de-Watford	EF1			Structural damage observed in Saint-Pierre-les-Becquets	Two tornadoes
=== 2020 ===
2020, June 24	Sainte-Jeanne-D'arc	EF0			Minor tree damage; A boat suffered damage	
2020, July 19	Saint-Eugène-de-Chazel	EF1				
2020, July 19	Val-Saint-Gilles	EF2				
2020, July 27	Saint-Isidore-de-Clifton Saint-Mathias-de-Bonneterre	EF1			Some homes damaged	
2024, May 27	Rigaud Très-Saint-Rédempteur	EF1			Destroyed and damaged trees; Damaged houses and garages	Tornado crossed Autoroute 40

=== List of Quebec tornado strengths (1870-2023) ===
Not rated	F0 (EF0)	F1 (EF1)	F2 (EF2)	F3 (EF3)	F4 (EF4)	F5 (EF5)
~8	~108	~214	~91	~8	~1	~0

== Saskatchewan ==
Date	Location of impact(s)	Strength	Death	Injuries	Damage	Other notes
=== 1889 ===
1889, April 7	Last Mountain Lake	Not rated			Many homes and barns destroyed	
=== 1898 ===
1898, June 20	Wolseley	Not rated			A skating and curling rink, church, homes and a stable destroyed; Three Canadian Pacific Railway freight cars overturned	
1898, June 20	Percy	Not rated	~1		Roof of a farmhouse ripped off	Percy is now a ghost town
1898, July 31	West of Regina	Not rated			Several telegraph poles destroyed	
1898, August 17	Hirsch	Not rated		~3		
=== 1900 ===
1900, August 3	Qu'Appelle	Not rated			Large concrete dwelling completely destroyed	Two horses killed.
1900, August 28	Whitewood Wapella	Not rated	~5	~2	Town of Whitewood mostly demolished; Significant damage done in Wapella	
1900, August 28	Yellow Grass	Not rated			Numerous structures in Yellow Grass destroyed	
=== 1901 ===
1901, August 29	Yorkton	Not rated			Many roofs blown off; A new brick house destroyed; A horse stable containing 3 horses was lifted and thrown 50 feet	The horses were unharmed
=== 1904 ===
1904, June 10	Carlyle	Not rated			A skating rink, kitchen, hotel and a few stables were destroyed	
1904, July 15	Near Saskatoon	Not rated			Stable thrown and scattered 0.8 km (0.5 mi); Outbuildings near the stable were also badly damaged; Property loss estimated at C$200 (C$6,768 in 2025)	
=== 1906 ===
1906, June 14	Balgonie	Not rated			Skating rink destroyed; Horse stable flipped	
1906, August 1	North Battleford	Not rated		~1	Newly built church swept away; A couple of houses overturned	
=== 1907 ===
1907, July 6	Near Oxbow	Not rated			Kimberly school house completely demolished; Several granaries destroyed	
1907, August 8	Tuxford	Not rated			A church, hotel, and large barn were moved from their foundations; Hardware store reduced to small fragments; Sidewalks ripped up	Every building in Tuxford was damaged
1907, August 8	Last Mountain Lake	Not rated	~1	~7		
1907, August 8	Zealandia	Not rated	~1			
=== 1908 ===
1908, July 22	Frobisher	F3	~3	~12		
1908, July 29	Fillmore	Not rated	~1	~7	School destroyed; Large barn destroyed	
1908, July 29	Warman	Not rated			Church shifted; Saskatchewan Trading Company's warehouse was destroyed	
=== 1909 ===
1909, April 15	Piche (now called Bents)	Not rated			A half completed house was lifted and thrown next to another homestead	
1909, July 1	Carievale Gainsborough	Not rated	~5	~28	Farm machinery twisted and thrown over 0.8 km (0.5 mi); Homes and out-buildings scattered across the prairie, reduced to fragments; Post office destroyed	Hen-sized hail reportedly fell.
1909, July 4	Gravelbourg	Not rated	~1		Roof torn off a house and thrown 60 yards	
1909, July 16	Golden Valley	F3		~4	Multiple homes destroyed	
1909, July 16	North of Wilkie	Not rated		~1	House completely destroyed; Debris driven into the ground; Property loss estimated at C$1,500 (C$31,655 in 2025)	
=== 1910 ===
1910, June 21	South of Moose Jaw	Not rated	~3	~7	Every house and shack in the path was destroyed	
1910, June 23	Palmer	Not rated	~3	~8		
1910, June 27	Weyburn	Not rated	~1	~1		
1910. July 3	Grandora	Not rated	~1	~1		
1910, July 29	Beverley	Not rated			Quon Koy demolished; Home east of Beverley destroyed	
=== 1911 ===
1911, May 9	Carievale	Not rated			Skating rink wrecked; Lumber carried several hundred yards; Numerous structures, including barns and a kitchen destroyed	
1911, July 9	Huronville	Not rated		~3	Several homes lifted and thrown over 1.6 km (1 mi)	
1911, July 12	Wawota Kennedy	Not rated			Multiple barns and fences destroyed	
=== 1912 ===
1912, June 30	Regina	F4	~28	>300	Estimated C$4,500,000 in damage (C$136,000,000 in 2025)	The deadliest tornado in Canadian history; Known as the "Regina Cyclone"
=== 1913 ===
1913, August 14	Ogema	Not rated	~2			
=== 1916 ===
1916, August 28	Atwater	Not rated	~1	>4		
=== 1919 ===
1919, June 27	Quill Lake	Not rated	~2	~2		
1919, June 27	Lanigan	Not rated	~1			
=== 1920 ===
1920, July 22	Alameda Frobisher Lampman Steelman Estevan	F3	~3	>20	Estimated C$100,000 in damage (C$1,397,457 in 2025)	Grazulis rated it F5.
=== 1922 ===
1922, July 21	Crystal Springs	Not rated			Lifted and dropped a house	
1922, August 15	Eastend	F3	~2	~4		
=== 1923 ===
1923, June 16	Sceptre	Not rated	~1			
1923, June 16	Rosetown	Not rated	~1	~3		
1923, July 7	McGee	Not rated	~1	~4		
=== 1924 ===
1924, July	Constance	Not rated	~1			
=== 1926 ===
1926, July 14	Waldron	Not rated	~2	~5		
=== 1927 ===
1927, June 18	Elfros Mozart	F3	~1	~6	House picked up	
=== 1932 ===
1932, May 31	Aberdeen	Not rated	~1			
=== 1935 ===
1935, July 1	Benson	F4	~1	~2		
1935, July 6	Smiley	F3	~2			
1935, July 28	Île-à-la-Crosse	Not rated	~1	>3		
=== 1944 ===
1944, July 1	Lebret	Not rated	~4			Two tornadoes
1944, August 9	Kamsack	F4	~3	~44	Destroyed over 400 homes; Destroyed over 100 businesses	Known locally as the "Kamsack Cyclone"
=== 1950 ===
1950, November	Regina	Not rated				An exact date is unknown
=== 1958 ===
1958, April 16	Watrous	Not rated			Destroyed a large barn	Many pigs killed; Pigs thrown up to 5 km (3.1 mi) away
=== 1963 ===
1963, June 29	Spy Hill	F3	~1	~2	Destroyed homes; Damaged property; Four farms heavily damaged	
=== 1968 ===
1968, April 11	Watson	Not rated			Destroyed a garage	
=== 1973 ===
1973, July 5	Kelvington	Not rated				
=== 1976 ===
1976, June 3	Davidson	Not rated	~1	~15		
=== 1979 ===
1979, July 10	Glasnevin	Not rated	~1			
1979, August 8	Regina	F2			Damage to parts of the city	Two unconfirmed tornadoes in the area
=== 1980 ===
1980, May 25	Dubuc	F0			Trees, signs and a chimney downed	
1980, May 25	Carnduff	F1			Trees uprooted; Grain auger overturned; Quonset destroyed	
1980, May 25	Bellegarde	F1			Barns and outbuildings destroyed or damaged; Trees uprooted; Estimated C$10,000 in damage (C$37,307 in 2025)	
1980, May 25	Creelman	F1			Curling rink wrecked; Barn flattened	
1980, May 26	Quill Lake	F0			Roofs ripped off of small buildings	
1980, June 11	Estevan	F0				
1980, June 23	Invermay	F1			Large barn, camper home and granary completely destroyed	
1980, June 23	Francis	F1		~1	Two barns and several shed damaged	
1980, June 23	Ebenezer	F1			Trees uprooted; Garage demolished	
1980, July 6	Prince Albert	F1			Part of a roof blown off; Storage shed dropped in neighbors yard	
1980, July 10	Fairy Glen Gronlid	F1			Cattle shed annihilated; Several large trees uprooted	
1980, July 28	North Battleford	F0			Utility shed damaged; Doghouse with dog inside blown against a garage	
=== 1981 ===
1981, May 28	Wakaw	F0			Two steel bins destroyed, another overturned	
1981, June 16	Gallivan	F0			Straw and weeds lifted	
1981, June 16	Delmas	F0				
1981, July 1	Carnduff	F0				
1981, July 14	Govan	F0				
1981, July 28	Torch River	F0				
1981, July 29	Regina	F0				
1981, August 5	Aylesbury	F0				
1981, August 5	Kronau	F1			Old skating rink and garage destroyed; Camper trailer tossed around	
1981, August 16	Pense	F0				
1981, August 17	Hughton	F1			Eight steel bins and a wooden shed destroyed at a farm	
1981, August 22	Stenen	F0				
1981, August 22	Wadena	F0				
=== 1982 ===
1982, April 30	Cudworth	F0			Metal garden shed tossed into neighbour's yard	
1982, June 2	Prince Albert	F0				
1982, June 5	Delisle	F0				
1982, June 6	Prince Albert	F0				
1982, June 15	Parkbeg	F0				
1982, July 1	Golden Prairie	F1			Large barn and chicken coup demolished	
1982, July 16	Colgate	F1			Barn destroyed; Roof torn off a house; Two silos crushed inwards at the top	
1982, July 19	Carrot River	F1			Trees snapped and uprooted; Damage to buildings on a farm	
1982, August 5	Carnduff	F0				
1982, August 11	Ponteix	F2			Concrete and wood walls at a Power and Liquor store flattened; Auto body shop and school roof damaged	
1982, August 11	Prince Albert	F0				
1982, August 11	Marshall	F1			Nine steel bins destroyed	
1982, August 14	Denholm	F1			Three steel power transmission towers destroyed, three others damaged	
1982, August 17	Sylvania	F1			19 out of 28 steel bins destroyed or damaged	
1982, August 18	Hardy	F1				
=== 1983 ===
1983, May 19	Bengough	F1			Damage to a farm; Debris thrown over 100 meters away	
1983, May 29	Silton	F0				
1983, June 20	Lumsden	F0				
1983, June 24	Prince Albert	F0				
1983, June 24	Jackfish Lake	F0				
1983, June 24	Coleville	F0				
1983, June 24	Chamberlain	F0				
1983, June 24	Strasbourg	F0				
1983, June 24	Marengo	F0				
1983, June 24	Yellow Grass	F0				
1983, July 8	Gull Lake	F1			Barn roof carried 200 m.; House damaged; Trees downed	
1983, July 8	Cadillac	F1			Large machine shed thrown; 2x4's launched through trailers; Chicken coup and meat cutting house destroyed	
1983, July 9	Fort Qu'Appelle	F0			High-voltage power line down	
1983, July 9	Regina	F1			Hydro poles snapped; Buildings damaged	
1983, July 20	Forgan	F1				
1983, July 20	Stewart Valley	F1				
1983, July 20	Pennant	F3			Home levelled to its foundation; Hockey rink flattened; Debris scattered up to a kilometre (0.6 mi) away; Estimated >C$5,000,000 in damage (>C$14,118,150 in 2025)	
1983, July 25	Central Butte	F1			House under construction destroyed; Steel bin moved 30 m; Multiple trees uprooted	
1983, July 29	Radville	F0				
1983, August 5	Maxstone	F0				2 tornadoes observed on the ground
1983, August 12	Sturgis	F0				
1983, August 18	Moose Jaw	F0				
1983, September 5	La Ronge	F0				Waterspout
=== 1984 ===
1984, May 12	Broadview	F0				
1984, May 12	Esterhazy	F0				
1984, May 12	Whitewood	F1			Homes damaged; Garage thrown; Trees uprooted	
1984, May 15	Mankota	F0			Two wood granaries destroyed	
1984, May 16	Beaubier	F1			Buildings and granaries damaged	
1984, May 16	Outram	F1			Barn and chicken house flattened	16 chickens missing
1984, May 16	Griffin	F1			Large trees uprooted; Quonset hut flattened; Damage to barn roof	
1984, May 16	Estevan	F0			Small building damaged	
1984, May 16	Estevan	F1			Quonsets and barns damaged	
1984, May 20	Burgis	F1			Steel bins, a plywood bin, two grain augers and a barn destroyed at a farmhouse; Large tree uprooted	
1984, May 20	Sunnyside	F0				
1984, June 12	Rocanville	F0			No damage reported	
1984, June 22	Wynyard	F0			Large pine tree downed; Multiple small buildings collapsed or swept off foundations	
1984, June 28	Gull Lake	F0			Outbuilding lifted; Trees uprooted	
1984, June 29	Langham	F0			Trees uprooted; Irrigation pipe twisted	
1984, June 29	Kindserley	F1			Grain bins destroyed; Farm buildings damaged	
1984, July 6	Maymont	F0			Shed twisted; Roof of cattle shed damaged	
1984, July 20	Tobin Lake	F1			Severe tree damage; Cabin roof and trailer badly damaged	
1984, August 19	Laird	F0			Four bins scattered over 800 m	
=== 1985 ===
1985, June 5	Langham	F0			Large chicken farm under construction demolished	
1985, July 6	Viscount	F0				
1985, July 12	Mazenod	F1				
1985, July 17	Frontier	F0				
1985, August 8	Lumsden	F0				
1985, August 30	Lintlaw	F2			Severe roof and wall damage; Eight granaries, a chicken coup and a barn swept away; Trees snapped	35 chickens missing
=== 1986 ===
1986, May 5	Lampman	F1			Roof damage; Trees broken; Four metal granaries collapsed	
1986, May 18	Lisieux	F0			Grain bins destroyed	
1986, May 18	Salvador	F1				
1986, May 19	Regina	F1				
1986, May 25	Saskatoon	F0				Was headed towards Dundurn.
1986, May 25	Hanley	F0				
1986, May 25	Melville	F0				
1986, June 1	Borden	F0				
1986, June 1	Borden	F0				
1986, June 1	Milden	F0				
1986, June 3	Assiniboia	F1			Roofs of 3 large grain bins destroyed	
1986, June 17	Aberdeen	F0				
1986, June 17	Dalmeny	F0				
1986, June 18	Salvador	F1			Farm building severely damaged	
1986, June 18	Lisieux	F0			Grain bins destroyed	
1986, June 19	Regina	F1			East end of a large barn lifted and dropped 7 m; Farm had 5 of 7 grain bins destroyed, the base of one bin carried 145 m	Almost rated F2.
1986, June 24	Saskatoon	F0				Headed towards Dundurn.
1986, June 25	Hanley	F0				
1986, June 25	Melville	F0			Damage to a TV tower	
1986, June 26	Broadview	F0				
1986, June 30	Wilcox	F0				
1986, June 30	Moose Jaw	F0				
1986, June 30	Estevan	F0				
1986, July 11	Strasbourg	F0				
1986, July 11	Strasbourg	F0				
1986, July 25	Oxbow	F1				
1986, July 25	Maidstone	F0				
1986, July 27	Congress	F0				
1986, July 27	Broadview	F0				
1986, July 27	Carlyle	F0				
1986, July 29	Spiritwood	F1				
1986, July 29	Tweedsmuir	F0				
1986, July 29	Sturgeon Lake	F0				
1986, July 29	Prince Albert	F0				
1986, July 29	Prince Albert	F0				
1986, July 29	Garrick	F0			Large spruce trees snapped	
1986, September 2	Portreeve	F0			Crane toppled	
=== 1988 ===
1988, June 9	Near Coronach	F0				
=== 1989 ===
1989, June 19	Central Saskatchewan	Not rated				Eight tornadoes
1989, June 20	Corinne	F1				
1989, July 8	Odessa Peebles	F2		~1		
1989, July 12	Gorlitz	F1				
1989, July 29	Lumsden Beach	F2		~3		
=== 1990 ===
1990, June 28	South of Saskatoon	Not rated				Large tornado
1990, July 7	Frontier	F0				
=== 1991 ===
1991, June 11	Near Regina	F0				
=== 1994 ===
1994, June 5	Saskatoon	F0				
1994, June 13	Delmas	F2				
=== 1995 ===
1995, August 27	Limerick	F0				
1995, August 29	Spring Valley	Not rated			Destroyed farms	
=== 1996 ===
1996, July 4	Saskatoon; Maymont; Osler	Not rated			Homes and property damaged; Damaged a drive-in	Eight tornadoes; Tornadoes were scattered through the three listed regions
1996, July 4	Maymont	F2			Maple trees knocked over; Telephone poles snapped	
1996, July 4	Fielding	F3			Trees downed; Damage to a farm; Pavement ripped up on the highway	
1996, July 4	Hepburn Aberdeen	F3			Wooden farmhouse damaged; All other buildings on the farm destroyed	
=== 1999 ===
1999, May 18	Saskatoon	Not rated				Three tornadoes
=== 2003 ===
2003, July 2	Narrow Hills Provincial Park	Not rated		Few	Tree damage; Campers were damaged	
=== 2005 ===
2005, May 23	Nipawin	Not rated				
2005, July 2	Estevan	Not rated				
=== 2006 ===
2006, August 24	Unity; Yorkton	Not rated				Two tornadoes
=== 2007 ===
2007, June 22–23	Lampman; Carnduff	Not rated		~1	Property damage	Two tornadoes
2007, July 31	Cupar	Not rated			Field damage; Farm damage	
=== 2008 ===
2008, July 10	Dafoe; Kandahar; Dollard; Stoughton	Not rated			Damaged roofs; Gas leak	Four tornadoes
2008, July 14	Battleford	Not rated				
2008, July 19	Dundurn	Not rated				Waterspout touched down on Turtle Lake
2008, July 27	Regina	F0			Dirt was kicked up	
2008, July 27	Chamberlain	F0				
2008, July 27	Radisson	F0			Spruce trees uprooted; Recently built shed damaged	
2008, July 27	Langham	F0			Dirt was kicked up	
2008, August 26	Prince Albert	Not rated		~6		
=== 2009 ===
2009, June 14	Cloan	F0				
2009, June 30	Baljennie	F1			Damaged several farm buildings	
2009, June 30	Hafford	F0				
2009, July 7	Elbow	F0				
2009, July 13	Leader	F0				
2009, July 30	Buffalo Narrows	F0				
=== 2010 ===
2010, June 21	Limerick; Avonlea	Not rated				Two tornadoes
2010, June 24	Wilkie	Not rated				
2010, June 25	Oxbow	Not rated			Damaged a farm	
2010, July 2	Kawacatoose Reserve	F3		Few	Damaged and destroyed homes; Destroyed farmhouses	
2010, July 22	North of Regina	Not rated				
2010, July 25	Lanigan; Humboldt	Not rated			Crop damage	Four tornadoes; Two tornadoes near Lanigan; Two tornadoes near Humboldt
=== 2011 ===
2011, June 2	Northwest of Shaunavon	F0			Damaged granaries; Power lines snapped	
2011, June 23	Fox Valley	Not rated			Power lines damaged; Store damage; Road damage	
2011, July 18	North of Big River	Not rated				Additional funnel clouds reported
=== 2012 ===
2012, June 15	Plover Lake; Biggar; Wilkie	Not rated				Eight tornadoes; Additional funnel clouds reported
2012, June 26	Caron	Not rated			Crop damage; Damaged farm buildings	An unconfirmed tornado was reported near Hodgeville
2012, July 3	Davidson; Southwest of Wynyard; Southwest of Watrous	Not rated			Heavy damage to a farm	Three tornadoes
2012, July 18	East of Rose Valley; North of Wadena; East of Wadena	Not rated				Three tornadoes
2012, July 21	Smeaton; Emma Lake (Saskatchewan)	Not rated			Destroyed a house; Tree damage; Damaged grain bins	Two tornadoes
2012, July 24	Balgonie; Southey; Fillmore; Grenfell	Not rated			Minor damage	Five tornadoes
2012, August 2	Elbow	Not rated				
=== 2013 ===
2013, June 2	Maple Creek	Not rated				
2013, June 10	Saltcoats	Not rated				
2013, July 4	Dollard	Not rated			Tree damage; Home and businesses were damaged	
2013, July 6	Between Wroxton and Kamsack	Not rated				
2013, July 13	Minton Redvers	Not rated				Two tornadoes
2013, July 15	Kronau; Gray; West of Yorkton; Southwest of Yorkton	Not rated				Four tornadoes; Three unconfirmed tornadoes near Hauge, Saskatchewan, Rosthern and Humboldt
=== 2014 ===
2014, July 5	Northwest of Kenaston; Southwest of Kenaston; North of Davidson	Not rated				Four tornadoes; Two tornadoes North of Davidson, Saskatchewan
2014, July 5	Kenaston	EF0			Tombstone damage; Tree damage	
2014, July 5	North of Outlook	EF2			Tree damage; Farm damage	
=== 2015 ===
2015, July 27	Gainsborough	Not rated				
=== 2016 ===
2016, May 21	Kincaid	Not rated				
2016, June 19	Naicam	Not rated				Two tornadoes
2016, July 1	Biggar	Not rated				
2016, July 7	Estevan	Not rated				
2016, July 10	Herbert	Not rated				
2016, July 19	Davidson	EF2			Destroys farm houses	
2016, July 23	Sturgis	Not rated				
2016, July 31	North of Melville; Otthon	EF2			Destroyed a house; Heavy farm damage	Two tornadoes
2016, July 31	Rokeby	Not rated				
2016, August 3	Bethune; Rhein	Not rated				Two tornadoes
2016, August 26	Melfort	Not rated				
=== 2017 ===
2017, May 14	Hepburn Hoey	Not rated			Damaged horse shed	Two tornadoes
2017, July 5	Alida	EF2			Damaged a house	
2017, July 10	Laporte	Not rated				
2017, July 21	Quill Lake; Fishing Lake; Jansen; Between Wapella and Rocanville; North of Lanigan	Not rated				Six tornadoes; Two tornadoes North of Lanigan
=== 2018 ===
2018, May 22	Northwest of Regina	EF0				
2018, May 24	Esterhazy; Tyvan	EF0				Two tornadoes
2018, May 25	Aylsham	EF0				
2018, June 23	Griffin	EF0				
2018, June 24	Brownlee	EF0				
2018, July 3	Otthon	EF0				
2018, July 9	Cantuar Chaplin Swift Current	EF0				Three tornadoes
2018, July 10	Golden Prairie; Val Marie; South of Wood Mountain; Coronach; Fife Lake	EF0				Six tornadoes; Two tornadoes near Val Marie
2018, July 10	Wood Mountain, Saskatchewan	EF2				
2018, July 10	Ferland, Saskatchewan	EF1				
2018, July 22	Langenburg	EF0			Uprooted trees	
=== 2019 ===
2019, June 29	15 km northwest of Goodsoil	EF1			Numerous trees snapped or uprooted; One camping trailer rolled and many were damaged by fallen trees; Many sheds were damaged	
2019, June 29	10 km northwest of Goodsoil	EF0				
2019, July 1	50 km south of Moose Jaw	EF0			No damage was reported	
2019, July 1	15 km northeast of Avonlea	EF0			No damage was reported	
2019, July 12	Over Old Wives Lake near Moose Jaw	EF0				Waterspout over Old Wives Lake at around 1 pm
2019, July 12	Northwest of Rockglen, Saskatchewan	EF0				Began at 4 pm; Unknown duration
2019, July 12	South of Rockglen	EF0				Began at 4:30 pm and lasted for five minutes
2019, July 13	7 km northwest of Northgate	EF0				Touched down at approximately 4:15 pm
2020 === 2020 ===
2020, July 4	Near Meyronne (formerly Glenbain)	EF1			Damage to home and outbuildings	Touched down at approximately 4:30 pm Estimated wind speed: 155 km/h
2020, July 4	Near Kincaid	EF0				Touch down at approximately 4:40 pm
2020, July 4	Near Assiniboia	EF0			No damage was reported	Touch down at approximately 6:23 pm. Estimated wind speed: 90–130 km/h
2020, July 10	Bengough	EF0				
2020, August 4	Estevan	EF0			No damage was reported	Touched down at approximately 5:00 pm
2020, August 21	Fulda	EF0			No damage was reported	Touched down at approximately 5:30 pm
2020, August 21	Humbolt	EF0				Touched down at approximately 5:10 pm
2021
2021, May 12	10 km NW of Saskatoon	EF0			No damage was reported	Touched down at approximately 12:25 pm
2021, June 15	6 km North of D'arcy	EF0			Damage was reported	Touched down at 5:36 pm
2021, June 15	Near McGee	Not rated				Touched down at 6:28 pm
2021, June 15	Near McGee	Not rated				Touched down at 6:34 pm
2023
2023, May 27	6 km south of Regina	EF1				
2026
2026, June 9	East of North Portal to south of Oxbow	EF3			Destruction of a home and outbuilding, as well as damage to grain bins, multiple vehicles, and trees on a singular farm property. Snapped power poles and damaged pump jacks were also found.	Touched down at around 6:55 pm CST.; Maximum estimated windspeed of 245 km/h (152.2 mph).; Path length of 32 km and a maximum width of 560 m.; Damage was found along the US border, though the survey could not continue into North Dakota.

=== List of Saskatchewan tornado strengths (1908–2023) ===
Not rated	F0 (EF0)	F1 (EF1)	F2 (EF2)	F3 (EF3)	F4 (EF4)	F5 (EF5)
~129	~506	~143	~42	~6	~3	~0

== Yukon ==
=== List of Yukon tornadoes ===
Date	Location of impact(s)	Strength	Death	Injuries	Damage	Other notes
=== 1959 ===
1959, September 9	Watson Lake	Not Rated			Poplar, Jackpine and Pine trees, 30 - 70 feet tall and 10 inches in diameter uprooted.	
=== 2015 ===
2015, June 29	Sambo Lake	EF1			Snapped trees	

=== List of Yukon tornado strengths ===
Not rated	F0 (EF0)	F1 (EF1)	F2 (EF2)	F3 (EF3)	F4 (EF4)	F5 (EF5)
~1	~0	~1	~0	~0	~0	~0

== Records and facts ==
=== Canada's deadliest tornadoes ===
Rank	Date	Location of impact(s)	Death	Sources
1	1912, June 30	Regina, Saskatchewan	28	
2	1987, July 31	Edmonton, Alberta	27	
3	1946, June 17	Windsor, Ontario	17	
4	2000, July 14	Pine Lake, Alberta	12	
5	1888, August 16	Valleyfield, Quebec	9	
6	1974, April 3	Windsor, Ontario	9	
7	1985, May 31	Barrie, Ontario	~8	
8	1970, August 20	Sudbury, Ontario	6	
9	1892, June 14	Sainte-Rose, Quebec	6	
10	1897, August 6	Buctouche, New Brunswick	5	

=== Canada's F5 / EF5 tornadoes ===
Date	Location of impact(s)	Strength	Death	Injury	Facts	Sources
2007, June 22	Elie	F5	0	0	The switch to the Enhanced Fujita scale means that this tornado will be the only F5 tornado in Canada	

=== Canada's largest tornado outbreaks ===
- Based on total tornadoes, not the strongest tornado
- At least 8 tornadoes

Rank (not tied)	Rank (tied)	Date	Province(s)	Total tornadoes	Greatest strength
1	1	2009, August 20	Ontario	16–19	F2
2	2	2017, June 18	Quebec	11	EF3
3	2	1985, May 31	Ontario	11	F4
4	3	2006, August 2	Ontario	10	F2
5	3	1982, July 14	Alberta	10	F1
6	4	1996, July 4	Saskatchewan	9	F3
7	5	2018, July 10	Saskatchewan	8	EF2
8	5	2012, June 15	Saskatchewan	8	Unknown
9	5	1989, June 19	Saskatchewan	8	Unknown
10	5	1987, July 31	Alberta	8	F4

== Media ==
Elie, Manitoba - 2007, June 22 - F5 tornado

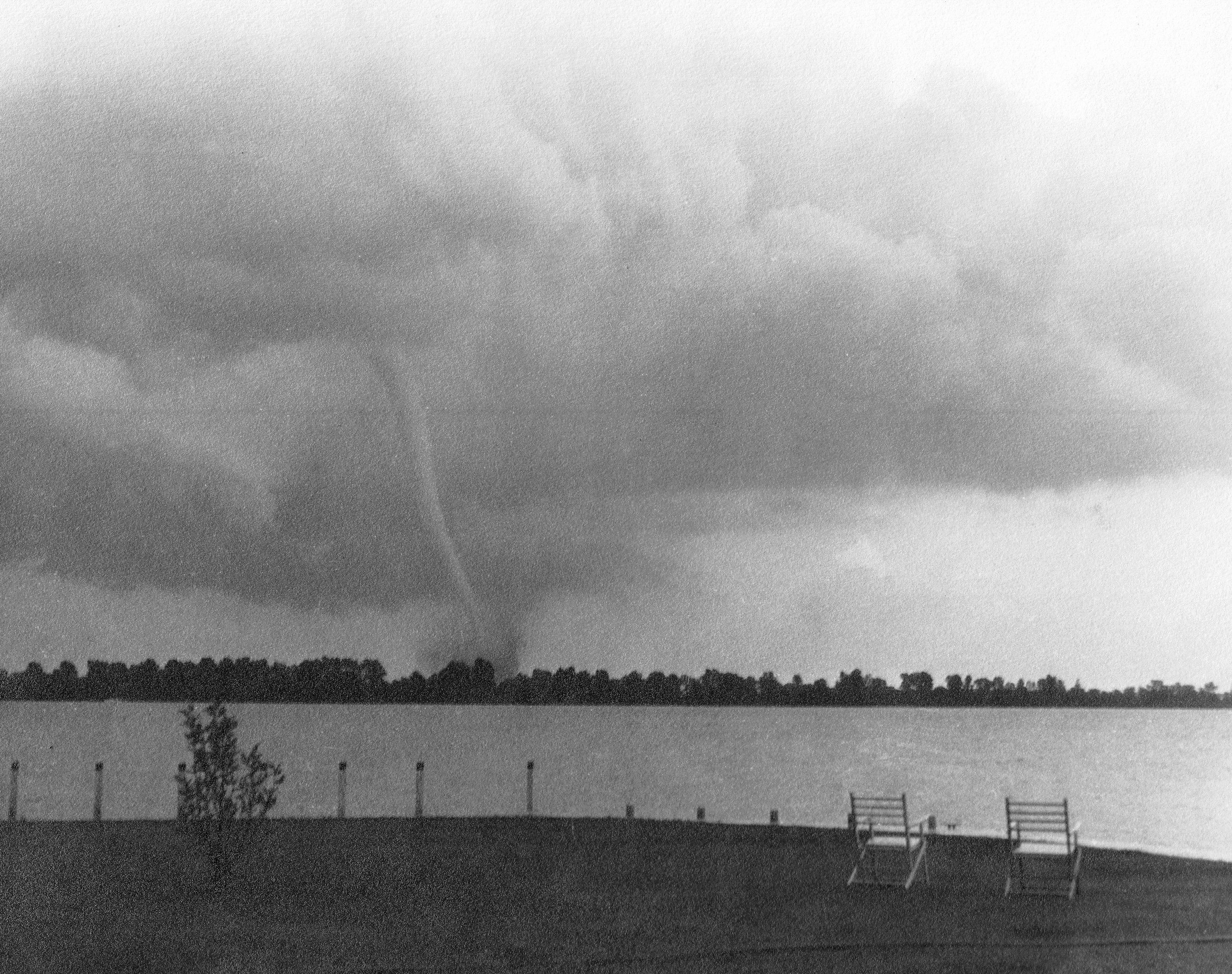
Windsor, Ontario - 1946, June 17 - F4 tornado

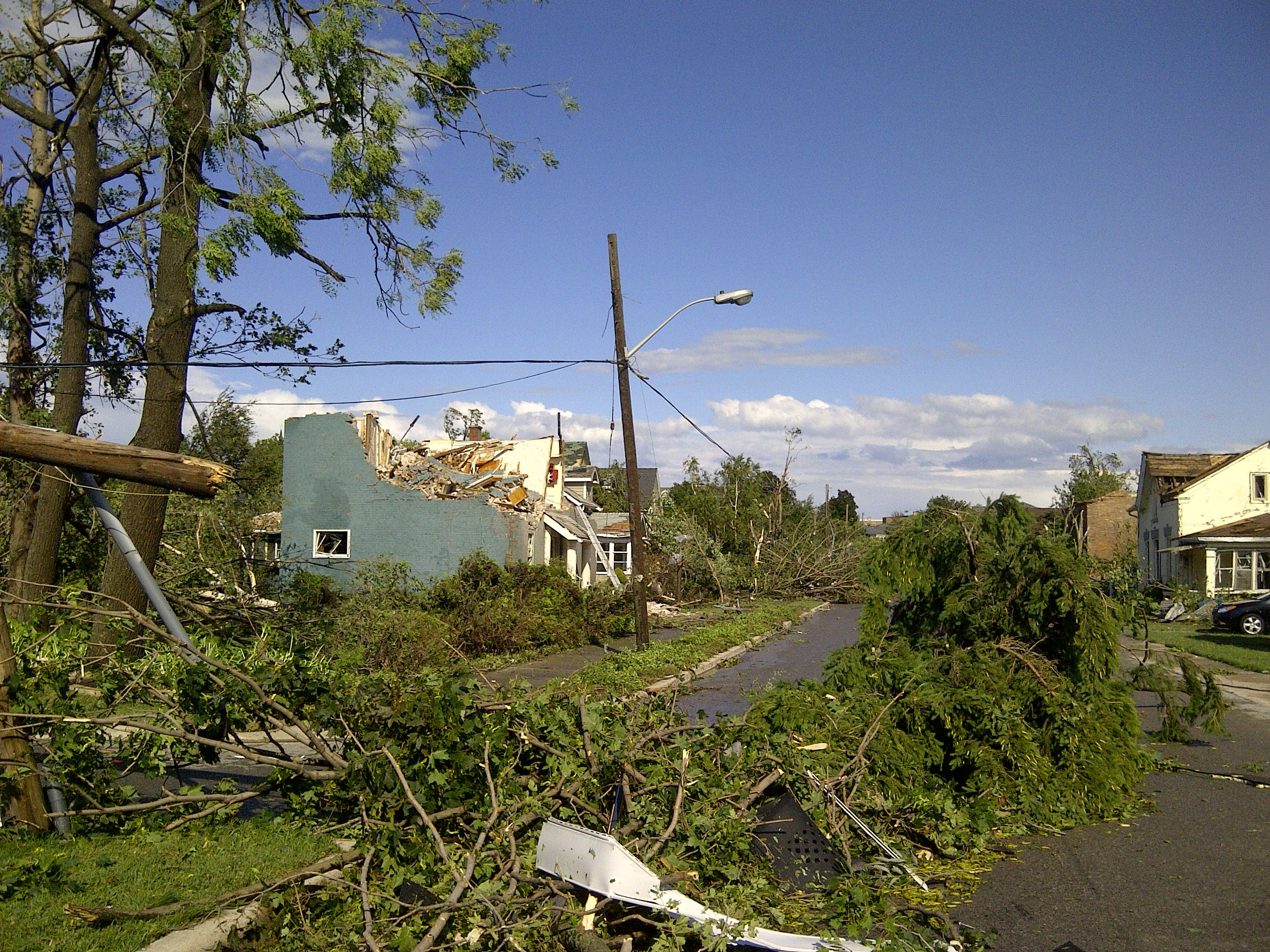
Goderich, Ontario - 2011, August 21 - F3 tornado damage

== Footnotes ==
- All figures for damages are in Canadian dollars.
- Prior to 2013, the Fujita system was used.
- Following 2013, the Enhanced Fujita system was and is being used.
- '~' indicates the number is around the real value

=== Tornado rating strengths ===
==== Fujita Scale ====
F0	F1	F2	F3	F4	F5
60–110 km/h	120–170 km/h	180–240 km/h	250–320 km/h	330–410 km/h	420–510 km/h

==== Enhanced Fujita Scale ====
EF0	EF1	EF2	EF3	EF4	EF5
90–130 km/h	135–175 km/h	180–220 km/h	225–265 km/h	270–310 km/h	≥315 km/h

== See also ==
- Tornado Alley
- Lists of Canadian tornadoes and tornado outbreaks
