= Lists of Canadian tornadoes and tornado outbreaks =

The following are lists of Canadian tornadoes and tornado outbreaks:

- List of Canadian tornadoes and tornado outbreaks (before 2001)
- List of Canadian tornadoes and tornado outbreaks (since 2001)
- List of fatal and violent Canadian tornadoes
- List of tornadoes by province (Canada)
- List of Canadian tornadoes in 2023
- List of Canadian tornadoes in 2025
- List of Canadian tornadoes in 2026
