= Otthon =

Community in Saskatchewan, Canada

- Unincorporated community
- Location of Otthon
- Coordinates: 51°06′00″N 102°36′04″W
- Country: Canada
- Province: Saskatchewan
- Rural municipality: Cana No. 214

Population (2021)
  - Total: 56
- Postal code: S0A 2P0
- Area code: 306

Otthon is an unincorporated community in the Canadian province of Saskatchewan. It is situated along Highway 10.

== History ==
The Otthon post office, opened in 1898, (closing briefly between 1898 and 1899) and then remained open until December 31, 1968. Otthon was established in 1894 by Christopher Rennie, with the name Otthon meaning home in the Hungarian language. The initial settlers were led by Rev. Janos Kovacs of the Hungarian Reformed Church in Pennsylvania. The settlement attracted Hungarian miners working in Pennsylvania as well as immigrants directly from Hungary.

== Demographics ==
In the 2021 Census of Population conducted by Statistics Canada, Otthon had a population of 56 living in 26 of its 33 total private dwellings, a change of −23.3% from its 2016 population of 73. With a land area of 0.27 km^{2} (0.10 sq mi), it had a population density of 209.1/km² in 2021.

== See also ==
- List of communities in Saskatchewan
