= Saskatchewan Highway 47 =

Provincial highway in Saskatchewan, Canada

Highway 47
- Highway 47 highlighted in red
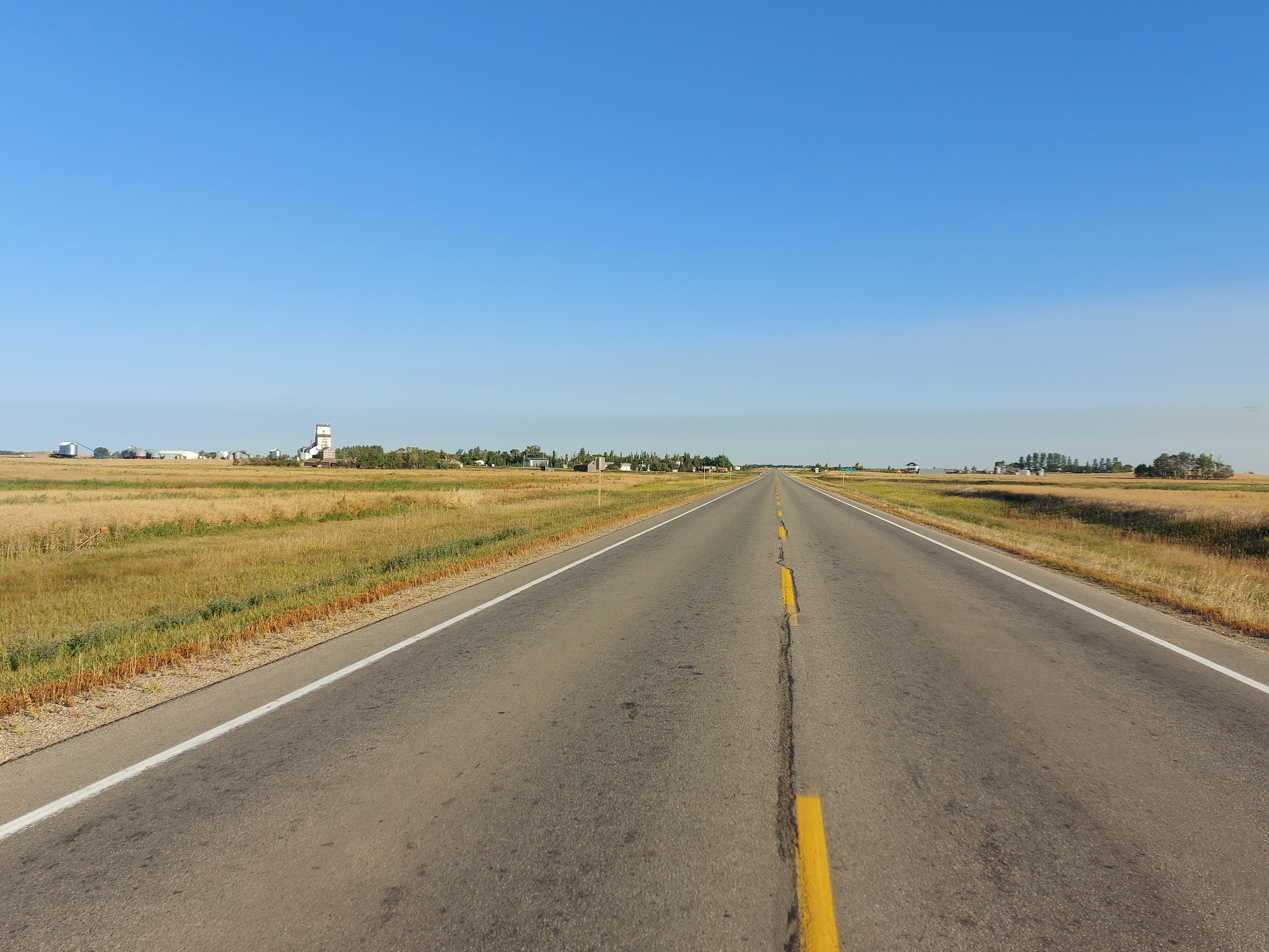
- Highway 47 with the village of Benson to the left

Route information
- Maintained by Ministry of Highways and Infrastructure
- Length: 358.0 km (222.5 mi)

Major junctions
- South end: ND 40 at the U.S. border near Estevan
- Highway 18 in Estevan; Highway 39 near Estevan; Highway 13 at Stoughton; Highway 48 near Peebles; Highway 1 (TCH) at Grenfell; Highway 22 near Killaly; Highway 10 in Melville; Highway 15 in Melville; Highway 16 (TCH/YH) at Springside; Highway 5 at Buchanan
- North end: Highway 49 at Preeceville

Location
- Country: Canada
- Province: Saskatchewan
- Rural municipalities: Estevan, Benson, Tecumseh, Wellington, Chester, Wolseley, Elcapo, Grayson, Cana, Orkney, Good Lake, Buchanan, Preeceville
- Major cities: Estevan, Melville

Highway system
- Provincial highways in Saskatchewan
← Highway 46	→ Highway 48

Highway 47 is a provincial highway in the Canadian province of Saskatchewan. The highway runs from North Dakota Highway 40 at the Canada–United States border until Highway 49 near Preeceville. It is about 358 kilometres (222 mi) long — 64 kilometres (40 mi) of which is unpaved from the Moose Mountain Creek crossing north until the intersection with Highway 1.

== History ==
Prior to the renumbering of the Yellowhead Highway in 1976, the section of Highway 47 between Springside and Preeceville was known as Highway 314. The northern extension of Highway 47 coincided with the renumbering of Highway 14 between Saskatoon and the Manitoba border to Highway 16.

The section of Highway 47 between Melville and Willowbrook was originally part of Highway 10, which turned east at Willowbrook along present-day Highway 52 to Yorkton. Highway 10 was realigned in the 1960s and the former north-south section became part of Highway 47.

== Route description ==
Highway 47 begins at the Noonan–Estevan Highway Border Crossing and heads north towards Estevan running alongside the Boundary Dam Reservoir and providing access to Woodlawn Regional Park. At the south end of Estevan, Highway 47 begins a 1.4-kilometre (0.87 mi) concurrency with Highway 18 that goes to 4th St. At 4th St in Estevan, 18 turns east and 47 turns west (concurrent with Highway 39A) and travels through downtown Estevan for three blocks. At 13th Ave, Highway 47 turns north and heads out of the city towards the Estevan Bypass. It crosses the bypass travelling to Benson and then Stoughton. At Stoughton, the highway crosses Highway 13 and meets the southern terminus of Highway 33. Highway 47 continues north through Stoughton, passes by Moose Mountain Lake and heads to Highway 48. It crosses 48 and heads north to Highway 1 (the Trans-Canada Highway) where it begins an eastward 8.4 kilometres (5.2 mi) long concurrency towards Grenfell. At Grenfell, Highway 47 turns north towards Melville and the junctions with Highways 10 and 15. It carries on north from Melville through Willowbrook, Springside, and Buchanan on it way to its northern terminus at Preeceville.

== Major intersections ==
From south to north:

Rural municipality	Location	km	mi	Destinations	Notes
Estevan No. 5		0.0	0.0	ND 40 south – Noonan, Columbus	Continues into North Dakota
Estevan No. 5		0.0	0.0	Canada–United States border at Noonan–Estevan Highway Border Crossing	
Estevan No. 5		3.6	2.2	Highway 703 east	
City of Estevan		14.8	9.2	Highway 18 west – Torquay	South end of Highway 18 concurrency
City of Estevan		16.2	10.1	Highway 18 east / Highway 39A south (4th Street) / Souris Avenue – North Portal, Oxbow	North end of Highway 18 concurrency; south end of Highway 39A concurrency
City of Estevan		16.7	10.4	Highway 39A north (4th Street) / 13th Avenue – Weyburn	North end of Highway 39A concurrency
Estevan No. 5		19.9	12.4	Highway 39 (Estevan Bypass) – Weyburn, Regina, North Portal	
Estevan No. 5		26.9	16.7	Highway 704 west – Hitchcock	
Benson No. 35		43.0	26.7	Highway 361 east – Lampman Highway 702 west – Midale	
Benson No. 35		56.3	35.0	Highway 705 west – Viewfield	
Tecumseh No. 65	Stoughton	75.9	47.2	Highway 13 (Red Coat Trail) – Weyburn, Carlyle	
Tecumseh No. 65	Stoughton	76.5	47.5	Highway 33 west – Francis, Regina	
Wellington No. 97	Ocean Man 69	95.1	59.1	Highway 701 – Creelman	South end of unpaved section
Wellington No. 97		108.3	67.3	Highway 711 – Osage, Corning	
Chester No. 125		124.5	77.4	Highway 708 west – Francis	
Chester No. 125		132.0	82.0	Highway 48 – Regina, Kipling	
Wolseley No. 155		158.7	98.6	Highway 1 (TCH) west – Indian Head, Regina	South end of Highway 1 concurrency; north end of unpaved section
Elcapo No. 154	Grenfell	165.3	102.7	Highway 616 south – Peebles	
Elcapo No. 154	Grenfell	167.1	103.8	Highway 1 (TCH) east – Moosomin, Winnipeg	North end of Highway 1 concurrency
↑ / ↓		196.6	122.2	Crosses the Qu'Appelle River	
Grayson No. 184		197.8	122.9	Highway 247 east – Crooked Lake	
Grayson No. 184		207.0	128.6	Highway 22 east – Grayson, Esterhazy	South end of Highway 22 concurrency
Grayson No. 184	Killaly	210.3	130.7	Highway 22 west – Neudorf	North end of Highway 22 concurrency
Cana No. 214	No major junctions				
City of Melville		229.8	142.8	Highway 10 west – Fort Qu'Appelle, Regina Highway 740 west	South end of Highway 10 concurrency
City of Melville		230.7	143.4	Highway 15 (3rd Avenue W) – Ituna, Bredenbury	
City of Melville		232.5	144.5	Highway 10 east / Queen Street – Yorkton	North end of Highway 10 concurrency
Cana No. 214	No major junctions				
Orkney No. 244	Willowbrook	262.5	163.1	Highway 15 – Ituna, Yorkton	
Orkney No. 244	Springside	281.6	175.0	Highway 16 (TCH/YH) – Saskatoon, Yorkton	South end of former Highway 314
Orkney No. 244	Springside	282.4	175.5	Highway 726 east / Range Road 2061 – Ebenezer	South end of Highway 746 concurrency; alternate access to Highway 16
Good Lake No. 274		291.8	181.3	Highway 726 west	North end of Highway 746 concurrency
Good Lake No. 274		296.7	184.4	Highway 229 east – Good Spirit Lake Provincial Park	
Good Lake No. 274		314.7	195.5	Highway 746 – Sheho, Canora	
Buchanan No. 304	Buchanan	324.0	201.3	Highway 5 – Saskatoon, Wadena, Canora	
Buchanan No. 304		336.9	209.3	Highway 754 west – Rama	
Preeceville No. 334	Preeceville	356.4	221.5	Highway 755 west – Wadena	
Preeceville No. 334	Preeceville	358.0	222.5	Highway 49 to Highway 9 – Kelvington, Norquay, Hudson Bay	North end of former Highway 314
1.000 mi = 1.609 km; 1.000 km = 0.621 mi: Concurrency terminus; Route transition

== See also ==
- Transportation in Saskatchewan
- Roads in Saskatchewan
