= Saskatchewan Highway 33 =

Provincial highway in Saskatchewan, Canada

Highway 33
- Highway 33 highlighted in red
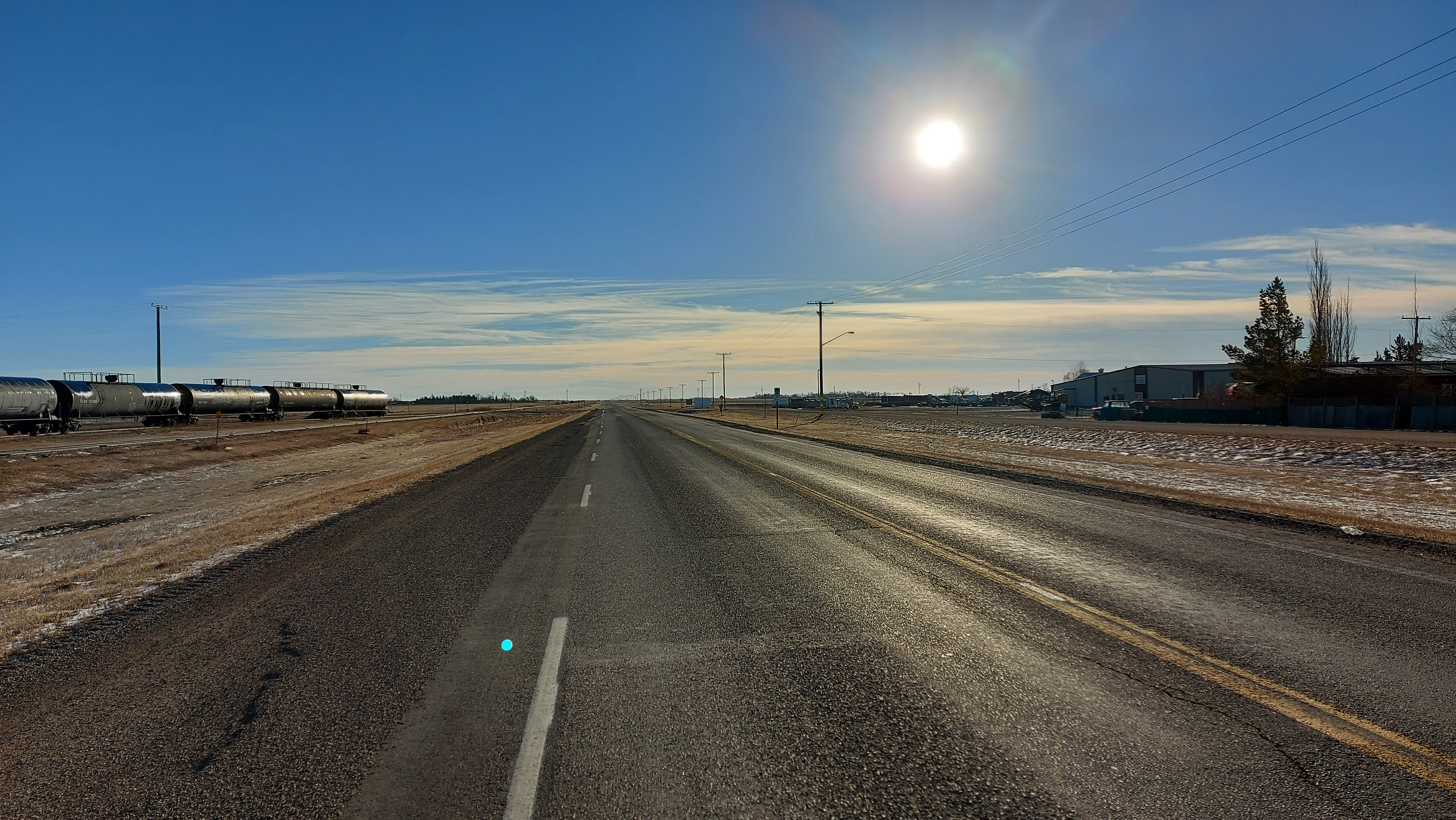
- Highway 33 at Creelman

Route information
- Maintained by Ministry of Highways and Infrastructure
- Length: 140.8 km (87.5 mi)

Major junctions
- West end: Victoria Avenue in Regina
- CanAm Highway / Highway 6 (Ring Road) in Regina; Highway 1 (TCH) in Regina; Highway 35 in Francis
- East end: Highway 47 in Stoughton

Location
- Country: Canada
- Province: Saskatchewan
- Rural municipalities: Sherwood, Edenwold, Lajord, Francis, Wellington, Tecumseh, Fillmore
- Major cities: Regina

Highway system
- Provincial highways in Saskatchewan
← Highway 32	→ Highway 34

Highway 33 is a paved provincial highway in the southern portion of the Canadian province of Saskatchewan. The highway runs from Victoria Avenue in the city of Regina to Stoughton in a south-easterly direction. The section of highway through Regina is divided and concurrent with Arcola Avenue. Highway 33, at a length of 141 kilometres (88 mi), is Canada's longest straight stretch of Highway.

== History ==
The Souris-Arcola-Regina Section branch line of the Canadian Pacific Railway (CPR) arrived in the area on 9 November 1904. The section of track from Regina to Stoughton was the longest piece of straight track worldwide, and still has the claim of being the longest straight track of North America. Highway 33 follows along this surveyed rail line. The CPR served the communities of Stoughton, Heward, Creelman, Fillmore, Osage, Tyvan, Francis, and Sedley.

== Route description ==
Highway 33 has its north-western terminus in Saskatchewan's capital city of Regina and its south-eastern terminus in Stoughton. In Regina, which is the only city along the highway's route, it begins at Victoria Avenue concurrently with Arcola Avenue and heads south-east. The highway is a limited-access road and divided for the first 8.5 kilometres (5.3 mi), after which it becomes a two-lane highway until its southern terminus. North of Arcola Avenue's intersection Victoria Avenue, Arcola Avenue continues west as an arterial road and becomes Saskatchewan Drive west of Winnipeg Street. The Highway 33 / Arcola Avenue concurrency headed south-east from Victoria Avenue to the diamond interchange at Ring Road. Carrying on from Ring Road, the highway is met by several arterial roads with the Arcola Avenue concurrency ending at the last one, Chuka Boulevard. Highway 33 carries on and about 1 kilometre (3,300 ft) from Chuka Boulevard, it has a diamond interchange with the Regina Bypass (Trans-Canada Highway). Beyond the bypass, Highway 33 continues south-east towards Stoughton. For its entire length, the highway is straight and, at 139 kilometres (86 mi), it is Canada's longest straight road and the world's twelfth. Including Arcola Avenue to Victoria Avenue, the straight section of road totals 141 kilometres (88 mi).

East out of Regina, Highway 33 follows Wascana Creek and provides access to Richardson. Continuing south-east, Highway 33 heads towards Kronau where it has an intersection with Highway 622 and provides access to Oyama Regional Park. After Kronau, the highway passes through the communities of Lajord and Sedley and intersects Highways 621 and 620 en route to Francis and Highway 35. North on Highway 35 heads to the Trans-Canada Highway and the Qu'Appelle Valley while south goes to Weyburn and Highways 13 and 39.

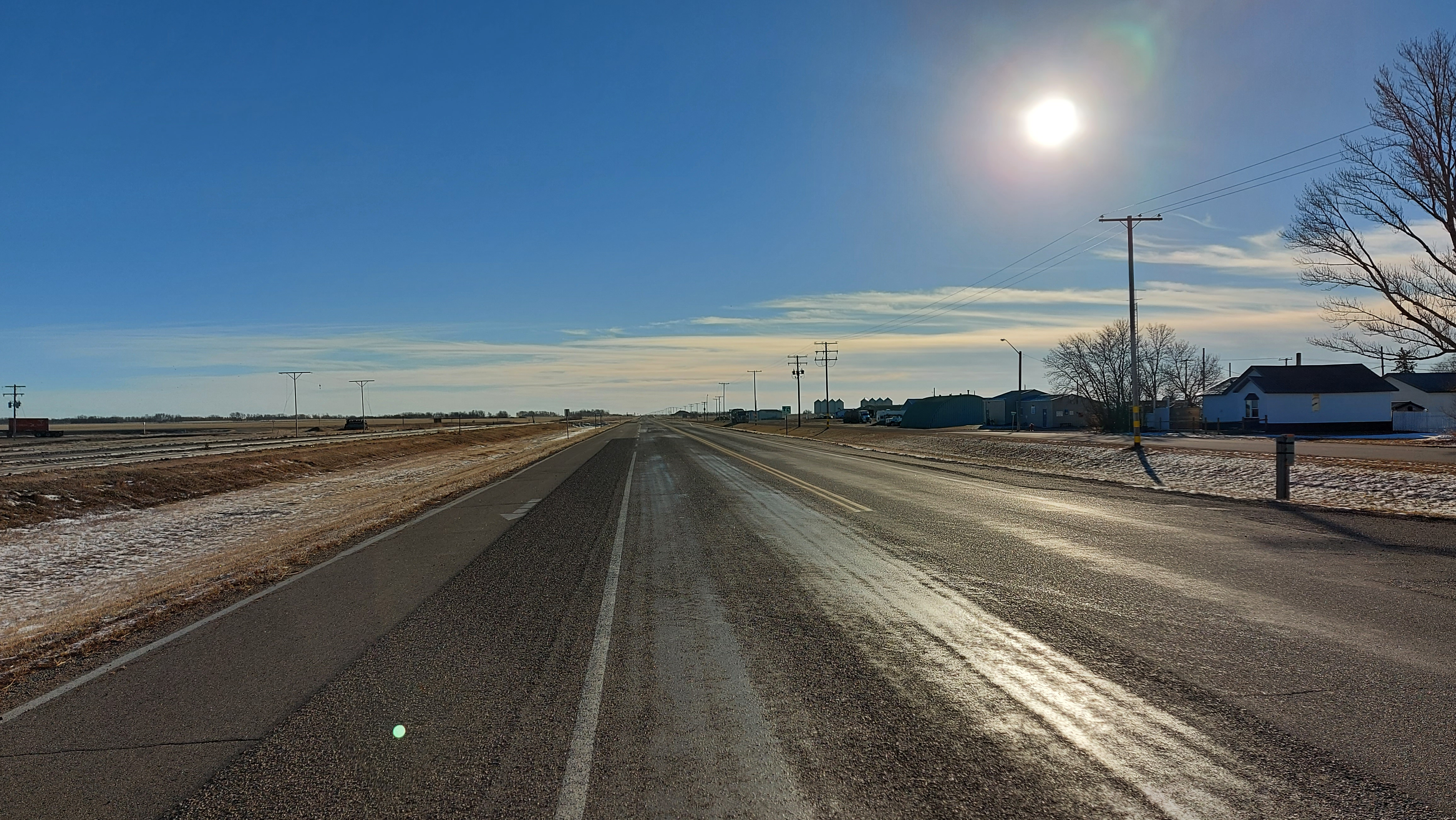
Highway 33 through Fillmore

From Francis, Highway 33 continues south-east where it intersects with Highways 711 and 606 and passes through the communities of Tyvan, Osage, Fillmore, Creelman, and Heward en route to its south-eastern terminus at Highway 47 in Stoughton. The town of Stoughton is at the intersections of three main highways, 13 (the Red Coat Trail), 33, and 47, and as such has the nickname "The Crossroads of Friendship".

=== Major attractions and geophysical features ===
The terrain along Highway 33 is mainly undulating flat agricultural wheat and grain fields. Grain and livestock production is the main economic industry in the area. The name of the community of Lajord, for example, translated from Norwegian means "flat place", which aptly describes the scenery.

Wascana Creek crosses Highway 33 at Tyvan from east to west and then meanders to the north-west alongside the highway to Regina. The creek is the main inflow for Wascana Lake in the heart of Regina.

Between Lajord and Kronau, on the east side of the highway, is Oyama Regional Park. The park is set on Oyama Reservoir which is situated along Manybone Creek — a tributary of Wascana Creek.

Osage Wildlife Refuge is a conservation area on the west side of Highway 33, about 4.8 kilometres (3 mi) south-east of Osage.

The Stoughton Campground is accessed from Highway 33 and has full-service campsites, a swimming pool, tennis court, and ball diamonds. Near the southern terminus of Highway 33, and accesses from Highway 13, is the 9-hole Stoughton Golf and Country Club.

== Major intersections ==
From west to east:

Rural municipality	Location	km	mi	Destinations	Notes
City of Regina		0.0	0.0	Victoria Avenue	Highway 33 western terminus
City of Regina		1.9	1.2	CanAm Highway / Highway 6 (Ring Road) to Highway 1 (TCH) west / Highway 11 north – Moose Jaw, Saskatoon	Interchange
City of Regina		6.8	4.2	Highway 1 (TCH) (Regina Bypass) – Moose Jaw, Winnipeg	Interchange; Highway 1 exit 234
Sherwood No. 159	No major junctions				
Edenwold No. 158		15.4	9.6	Highway 624 north – Pilot Butte	
Lajord No. 128	Kronau	25.6	15.9	Highway 622 – Balgonie, Riceton	
Lajord No. 128	Lajord	36.1	22.4	Highway 621 – Lewvan	
Francis No. 127	Sedley	51.4	31.9	Highway 620 north	
Francis No. 127	Francis	63.8	39.6	Highway 35 – Qu'Appelle, Weyburn	
Wellington No. 97	No major junctions				
Fillmore No. 96	Osage	89.3	55.5	Highway 711 – Cedoux	
Fillmore No. 96	Fillmore	102.7	63.8	Highway 606 north – Montmartre	West end of Highway 606 concurrency
Fillmore No. 96	Fillmore	103.8	64.5	Highway 606 south – Griffin	East end of Highway 606 concurrency
Fillmore No. 96	Creelman	114.9	71.4	Highway 701 east	
Tecumseh No. 65	Stoughton	140.8	87.5	Highway 47 – Grenfell, Estevan; To Highway 13 – Arcola, Carlyle, Weyburn	Highway 33 eastern terminus
1.000 mi = 1.609 km; 1.000 km = 0.621 mi: Concurrency terminus; Route transition

== See also ==
- Transportation in Saskatchewan
- Roads in Saskatchewan
