= Stewart Southern Railway =

Overview
- Headquarters: Fillmore, Saskatchewan
- Reporting mark: SSS
- Locale: Southern Saskatchewan, Canada
- Dates of operation: 2010–
- Predecessor: Canadian Pacific

Technical
- Track gauge: 4 ft 8 1/2 in (1,435 mm) standard gauge
- Length: 82 miles (132 km)

Stewart Southern Railway is a short line railway located in the South East region of Saskatchewan, with its headquarters located in the community of Fillmore. The line runs between Regina and Stoughton on the former Canadian Pacific line known as the Tyvan Subdivision. The Tyvan Sub parallels Saskatchewan Highway 33 for most of its length. The railway handles commodities such as peas, lentils, and potash with Seaboard being the primary Customer.

In 2011 the main shipper has changed from grain cars to oil tankers, topping out just before the last bust in the oil field of 100 cars per day to Regina. Purely Canadian, a grain facility has built on the line at LaJord, bringing a multimillion-dollar investment into the area and has become the largest shipper on the line as of 2019-2020

November 1, 2018, Watco began operating and managing all aspects of the railroad. In May 2020 Watco passed the management and operations to Xpert Rail Consulting.
