= Forget, Saskatchewan =

Village in Saskatchewan, Canada

Forget
- Village
- Village of Forget
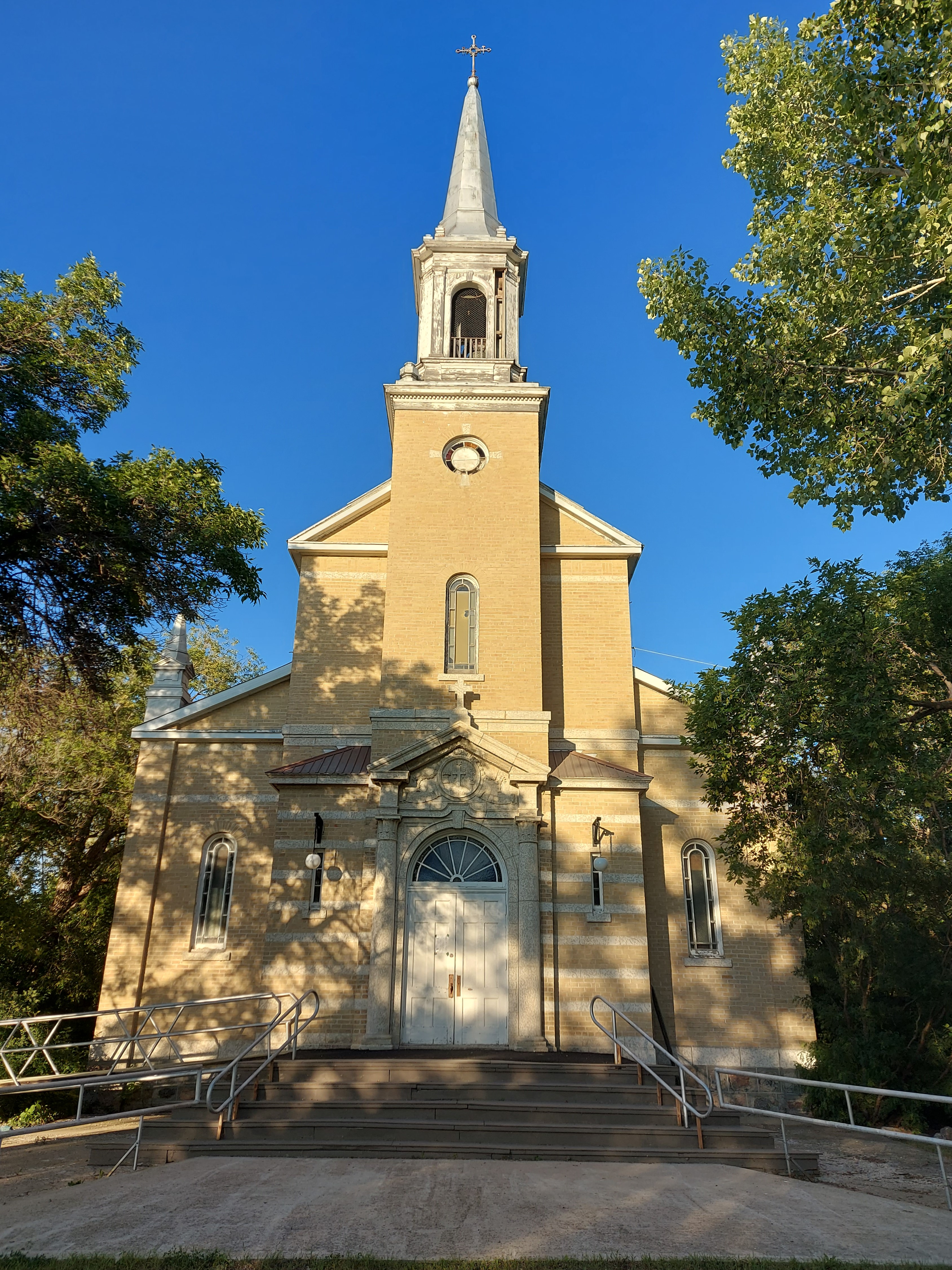
- Our Lady of La Salette Church in Forget

- Location within Saskatchewan Location within Canada
- Coordinates: 49°39′13″N 102°52′12″W
- Country: Canada
- Province: Saskatchewan
- Census division: 1
- Rural Municipality: Tecumseh No. 65

Government
  - Type: Municipal
  - Governing body: Forget Village Council
  - Mayor: Rick Coderre
  - Administrator: Zandra Slater

Area
  - Total: 1.39 km^{2} (0.54 sq mi)

Population (2016)
  - Total: 55
  - Density: 39.7/km^{2} (103/sq mi)
- Time zone: UTC-6 (CST)
- Postal code: S0C 0X0
- Area code: 306
- Highways: Highway 13 (Red Coat Trail / Ghost Town Trail) / Highway 616
- Railways: Canadian Pacific Railway

Forget /ˈfɔːrʒeɪ/ is a village in the Canadian province of Saskatchewan within the Rural Municipality of Tecumseh No. 65 and Census Division No. 1. It is east of Stoughton, near Highway 13.

Forget incorporated as a village on November 21, 1904. The village is named in honour of Amédée E. Forget, the first Lieutenant Governor of Saskatchewan.

== Demographics ==
Population history (1981–2016)
Year	Pop.	±%
1981	70	—
1986	81	+15.7%
1991	68	−16.0%
1996	62	−8.8%
2001	40	−35.5%
2006	40	+0.0%
2011	35	−12.5%
2016	55	+57.1%
2021	35	−36.4%
Source: Statistics Canada via Saskatchewan Bureau of Statistics

In the 2021 Census of Population conducted by Statistics Canada, Forget had a population of 35 people living in 18 of its 22 total private dwellings. With a land area of 1.37 km^{2} (0.53 sq mi), it had a population density of 25.5/km^{2} (66.2/sq mi) in 2021.

== See also ==
- Red Coat Trail
- List of communities in Saskatchewan
- List of villages in Saskatchewan
