= Osage, Saskatchewan =

Village in Saskatchewan, Canada

Coordinates: 49°57′35″N 103°34′34″W

Location of Osage in Saskatchewan

Osage (2016 population: 20) is a village in the Canadian province of Saskatchewan within the Rural Municipality of Fillmore No. 96 and Census Division No. 2. The village is located on Highway 33, that runs south-east from Regina to Stoughton, at its intersection with Highway 711. The village has a grain elevator, post office, service station, and a two-sheet natural ice curling rink. Children from the area attend school in Fillmore, 13 km away. Osage celebrated its centennial in 2006.

Osage Wildlife Refuge is about 3 miles south-east of the village.

The Village was named after a town in Iowa.

== History ==
Osage incorporated as a village on May 8, 1906.

== Demographics ==
Population history (1981–2016)
Year	Pop.	±%
1981	49	—
1986	43	−12.2%
1991	33	−23.3%
1996	23	−30.3%
2001	25	+8.7%
2006	20	−20.0%
2011	20	+0.0%
2016	20	+0.0%
Source: Statistics Canada via Saskatchewan Bureau of Statistics

In the 2021 Census of Population conducted by Statistics Canada, Osage had a population of 25 living in 9 of its 13 total private dwellings, a change of 25% from its 2016 population of 20. With a land area of 0.62 km^{2} (0.24 sq mi), it had a population density of 40.3/km^{2} (104.4/sq mi) in 2021.

In the 2016 Census of Population, the Village of Osage recorded a population of 20 living in 10 of its 14 total private dwellings, a 0% change from its 2011 population of 20. With a land area of 0.59 km^{2} (0.23 sq mi), it had a population density of 33.9/km^{2} (87.8/sq mi) in 2016.

== See also ==
- List of communities in Saskatchewan
- List of villages in Saskatchewan
