= Kronau, Saskatchewan =

Community in Saskatchewan, Canada

Kronau
- Hamlet
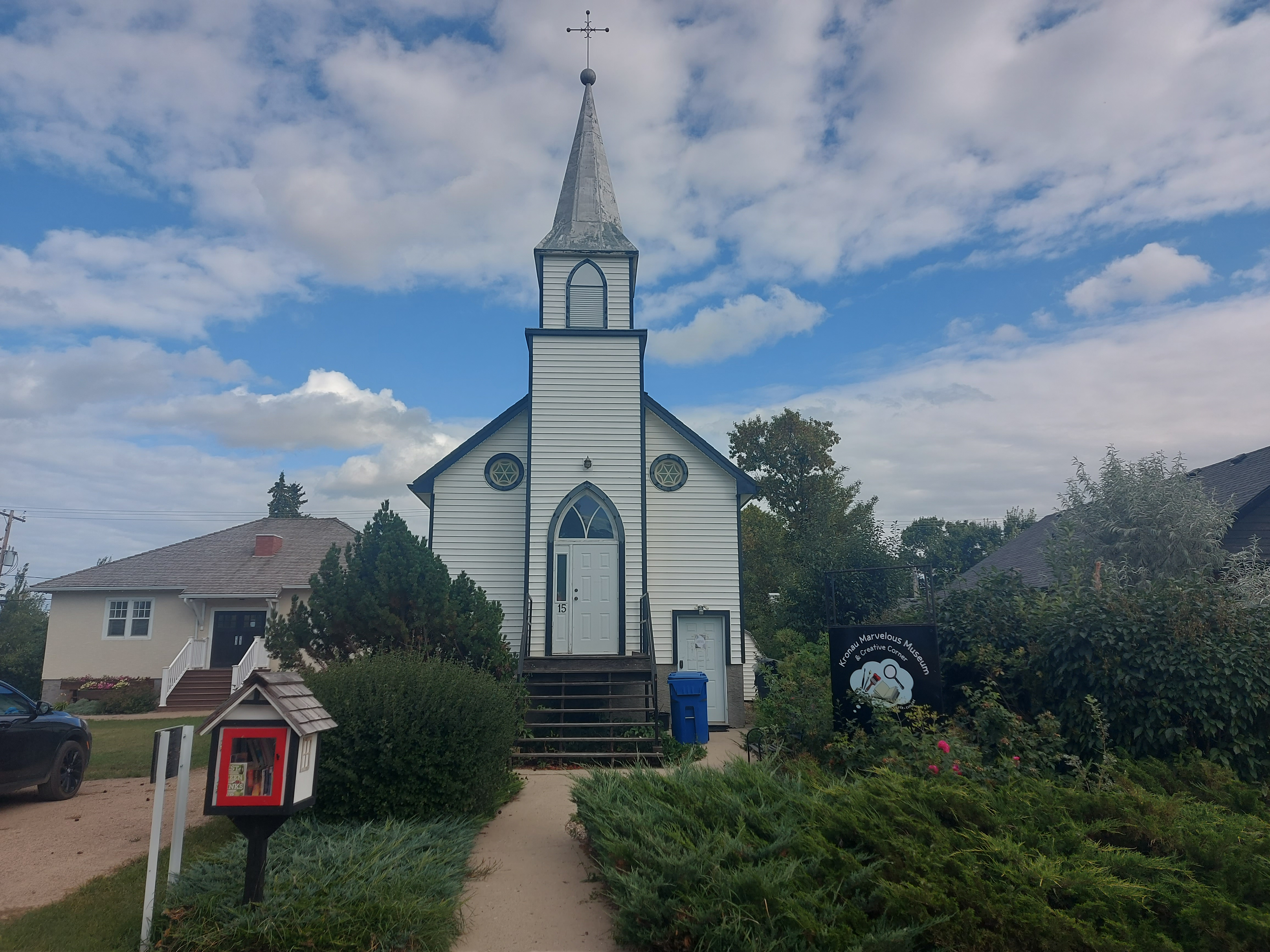
- Kronau Marvelous Museum & Creative Corner

- Location in Saskatchewan Kronau (Canada)
- Coordinates: 50.3059°N 104.2912°W
- Country: Canada
- Province: Saskatchewan
- Census division: 6
- Rural municipality: Lajord No. 128

Population (2021)
  - Total: 288
- Highway(s): Highway 33 / Highway 622
- Railway(s): Stewart Southern Railway
- Waterway(s): Kronau Creek

Kronau is a hamlet in the Canadian province of Saskatchewan about 28 kilometres (17 mi) south-east of Regina on Highway 33 in the Rural Municipality of Lajord No. 128. Listed as a designated place by Statistics Canada, the hamlet had a population of 288 in the Canada 2021 Census.

== History ==
The area of Kronau was first settled by German-Russians from near the Black Sea and German-Americans from the northern United States during the late 19th and early 20th century.

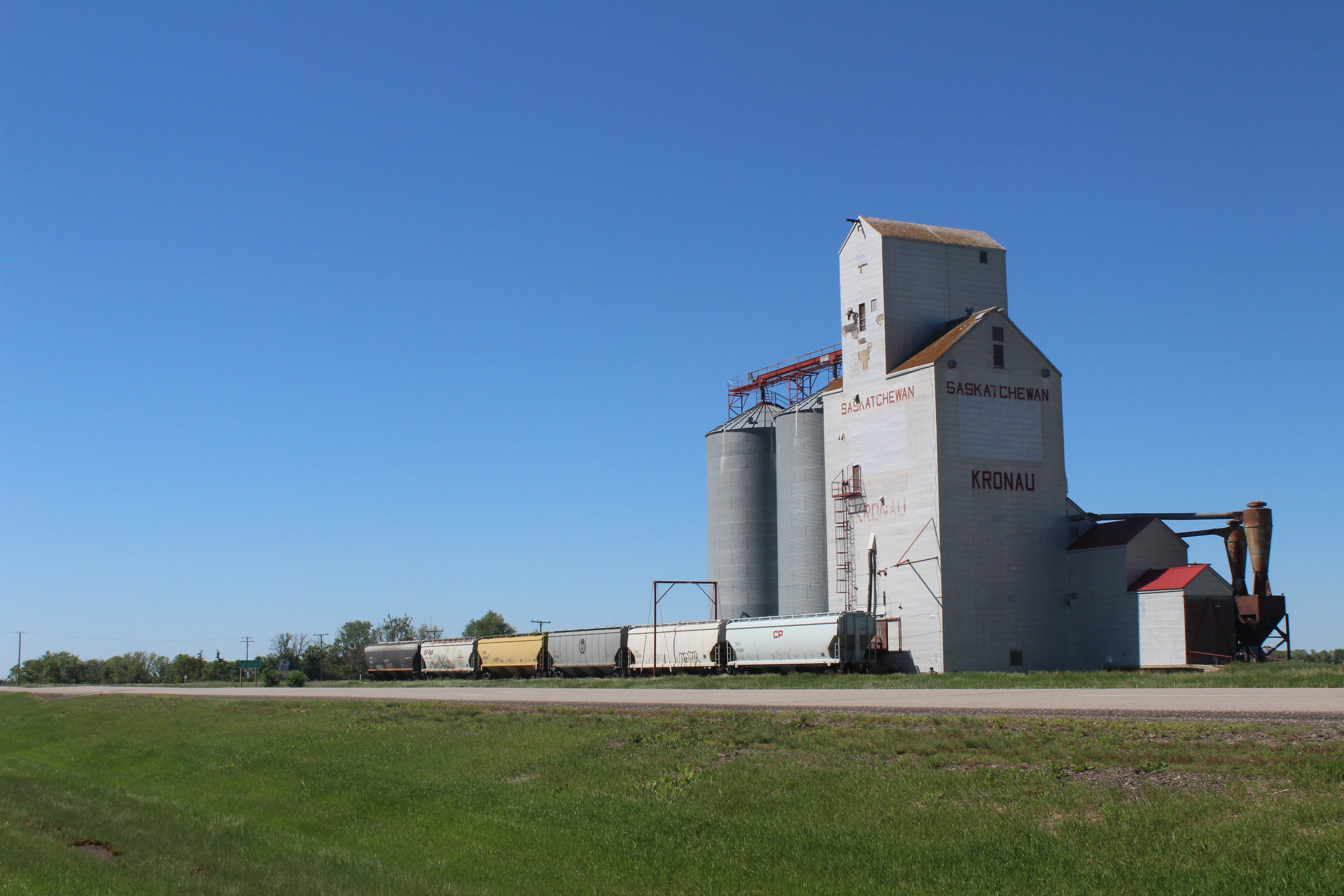
Grain elevator in Kronau

== Heritage sites ==
- St. Peter's Church and Grotto at St. Peter's Colony is 12 km east of Kronau. The Catholic church was completed in 1904 next to a cemetery established in 1892. The grotto built in 1917 by Father Henry Metzger became a pilgrimage site. Father Metzger, a noted artist, also painted the Stations of the Cross in the church. The church and grotto site was listed on the Canadian Register of Historic Places in 2010.
- Kronau Bethlehem Heritage Cemetery or Bethlehem Lutheran Church Cemetery was established in 1896. and was listed on the Canadian Register of Historic Places in 1985.

== Demographics ==
Population history (1911–2021)
Year	Pop.	±%
1911	102	—
1916	74	−27.5%
2011	250	+237.8%
2016	394	+57.6%
2021	288	−26.9%
Source: Government of Canada

In the 2021 Census of Population conducted by Statistics Canada, Kronau had a population of 288 living in 101 of its 103 total private dwellings, a change of −26.9% from its 2016 population of 394. With a land area of 0.67 km^{2} (0.26 sq mi), it had a population density of 429.9/km^{2} (1,113.3/sq mi) in 2021.

Canada census – Kronau, Saskatchewan community profile

	2011
Population	250 (+23.4% from 2006)
Land area	0.66 km^{2} (0.25 sq mi)
Population density	390.1/km^{2} (1,010/sq mi)
Median age	32.9 (M: 30.6, F: 36.0)
Private dwellings	84 (total)
Median household income

References: 2011

== See also ==
- List of communities in Saskatchewan
