= Tuvan =

Tuvan, Tyvan or Tuvinian can refer to:

- Of or pertaining to Tuva, a federal subject of Russia
  - Tuvans or Tuvinians, a Turkic ethnic group living in southern Siberia
  - Tuvan language, also known as Tuvinian, Tyvan or Tuvin, a Turkic language spoken in the Republic of Tuva
  - Tuvan throat singing, a singing technique where one can sing in two tones at the same time
- Tuvan syndrome, a fictional malady in the Star Trek episode "Inter Arma Enim Silent Leges" (Star Trek: Deep Space Nine)

== See also ==
- Tyvan, Saskatchewan
