= Sedley, Saskatchewan =

Village in Saskatchewan, Canada

Sedley
- Village
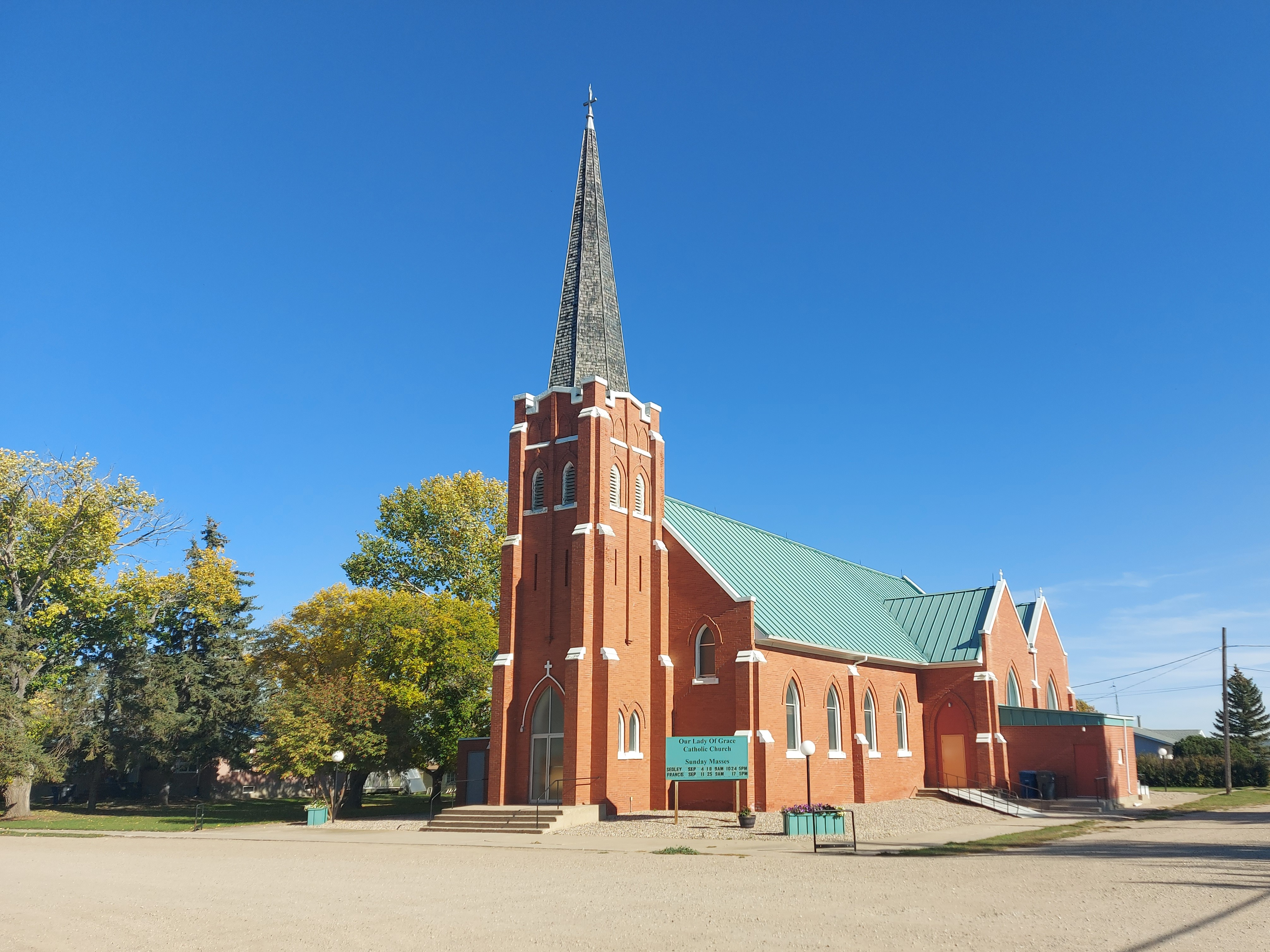

- Location within Saskatchewan Location within Canada
- Coordinates: 50°10′00″N 104°00′00″W
- Country: Canada
- Province: Saskatchewan
- Rural Municipalities (R.M.): Francis No. 127
- Post office Founded: 1904-07-01

Government
  - Mayor: Brian Leier

Area
  - Total: 1.31 km^{2} (0.51 sq mi)

Population (2011)
  - Total: 337
  - Density: 256.8/km^{2} (665/sq mi)
  - Summer (DST): UTC-6 (CST)
- Postal code: S0G 4K0
- Area code: 306
- Website: Official website

Sedley (2016 population: 358) is a village in the Canadian province of Saskatchewan within the Rural Municipality of Francis No. 127 and Census Division No. 6. It is 40 kilometres (25 mi) southeast of the city of Regina on Highway 33. This village is located at the intersection of Highway 33 and Highway 620. Sedley lies in a wheat-producing agricultural district.

== History ==
The Canadian Pacific Railway (CPR) rail branch line helped to settle this community. Sedley incorporated as a village on August 3, 1907. It was named for Sedley Blanchard, a lawyer.

== Geography ==
Wascana Creek runs just to the west of Highway 33.

== Demographics ==
Population history (1981–2016)
Year	Pop.	±%
1981	373	—
1986	360	−3.5%
1991	342	−5.0%
1996	305	−10.8%
2001	322	+5.6%
2006	319	−0.9%
2011	337	+5.6%
2016	358	+6.2%
Source: Statistics Canada via Saskatchewan Bureau of Statistics

In the 2021 Census of Population conducted by Statistics Canada, Sedley had a population of 367 living in 126 of its 137 total private dwellings, a change of 2.5% from its 2016 population of 358. With a land area of 1.34 km^{2} (0.52 sq mi), it had a population density of 273.9/km^{2} (709.3/sq mi) in 2021.

In the 2016 Census of Population, the Village of Sedley recorded a population of 358 living in 136 of its 136 total private dwellings, a 5.9% change from its 2011 population of 337. With a land area of 1.33 km^{2} (0.51 sq mi), it had a population density of 269.2/km^{2} (697.2/sq mi) in 2016.

== Notable people ==
- Kelly Bechard, hockey player and Olympian
- Carol Morin, broadcaster

== Published works ==
- Title Outline history of Our Lady of Grace Church, Sedley, Saskatchewan : On the occasion of its 75th anniversary Author Baker, Leonard, Mrs Published Weyburn, Sask. : Weyburn Review Ltd., 1981

== See also ==
- List of communities in Saskatchewan
- List of villages in Saskatchewan
