= Noonan–Estevan Highway Border Crossing =

Border crossing between Canada and the United States

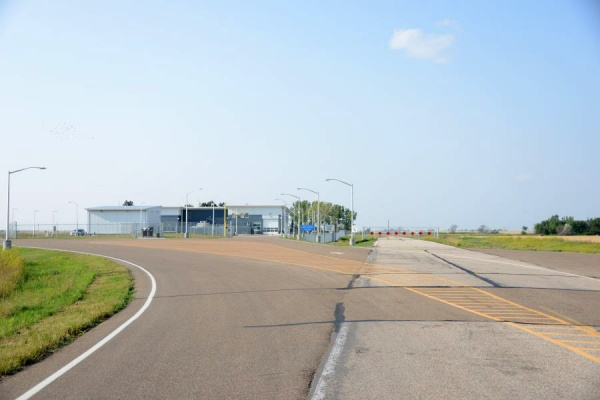
- US Border Inspection Station at Noonan, North Dakota

Locaiton
- Country: United States; Canada
- Location: ND 40 / Highway 47; US Port: 10945 107th Ave, Noonan, North Dakota 58765; Canadian Port: Saskatchewan Highway 47, Estevan, Saskatchewan S4A 2A2
- Coordinates: 48°59′58″N 103°00′18″W

Details
- Opened: 1913

Website
- US Canadian

The Noonan–Estevan Highway Border Crossing connects the cities of Noonan, North Dakota and Estevan, Saskatchewan on the Canada–US border. North Dakota Highway 40 on the American side joins Saskatchewan Highway 47 on the Canadian side.

== Canadian side ==
The customs office, established in 1913, was housed in the Public Building about 18 kilometres (11 mi) north of the border. The office operated under the administrative oversight of the Port of North Portal. A facility was not constructed at the border until 1937. The status was upgraded to Port of Estevan in 1950. Canada built its double-canopy border station in 1972. A rebuild plan issued in 2017 has yet to be finalized.

In 2020, the hours changed from being 8am to 9pm (summer) and 9am to 10pm (winter) to 8am to 4pm (summer) and mirroring the US winter hours.

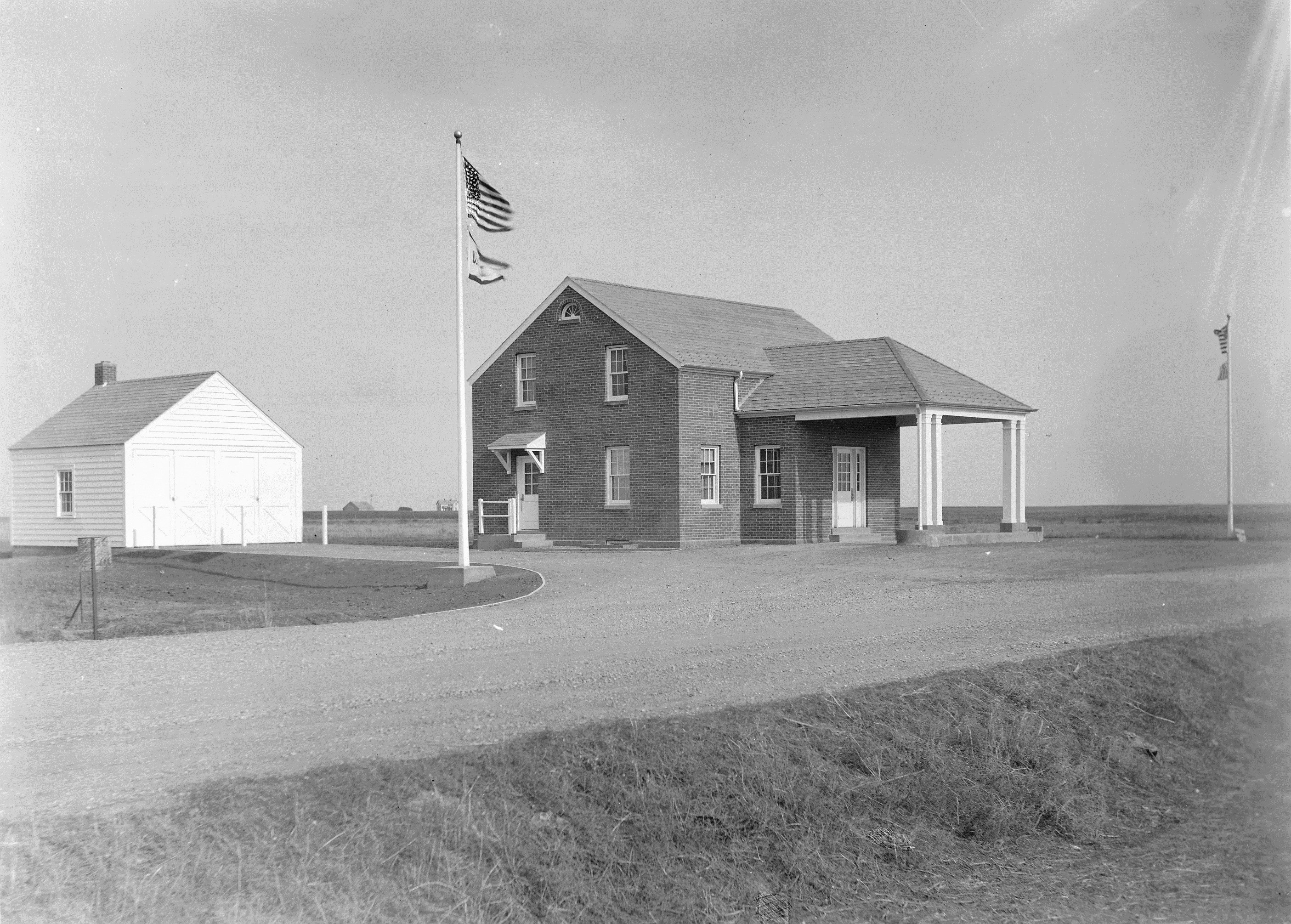
Noonan ND Border station, 1937

== US side ==
The US Customs office similarly relocated to the border in 1937. The US replaced its red brick border station with a ranch-style facility in 1975, and then demolished that in favor of a large grey modern facility which opened in 2011.

== See also ==
- List of Canada–United States border crossings
