= Heward, Saskatchewan =

Village in Saskatchewan, Canada

Heward
- Village
- Village of Heward
- Location of Heward in Saskatchewan Heward (Canada)
- Coordinates: 49.737°N 103.146°W
- Country: Canada
- Province: Saskatchewan
- Region: Saskatchewan
- Census division: 1
- Rural Municipality: Tecumseh No. 65

Government
  - Governing body: Heward Village Council
  - Mayor: Dale Hemphill
  - Administrator: Zandra Slater
  - MP: Robert Kitchen
  - MLA: Kevin Weedmark

Area
  - Total: .92 km^{2} (0.36 sq mi)

Population (2021)
  - Total: 44
  - Density: 47.8/km^{2} (124/sq mi)
- Time zone: UTC-6 (CST)
- Postal code: S0G 2G0
- Area code: 306
- Highways: Highway 33

Heward (2016 population: 44) is a village in the Canadian province of Saskatchewan within the Rural Municipality of Tecumseh No. 65 and Census Division No. 1. The village is located along Highway 33 in southeastern Saskatchewan. Even though it has under 50 people it still maintains a post office, rink, and hall that all service the farming community. In 1977, Prairie Trails and Tales: Heward Saskatchewan 1900-1976 was written by Muriel Dempsey.

== History ==
Heward incorporated as a village on November 21, 1904.

Bryce Dickey, born in Heward in 1908, wrote an extensive history of the village which is published in the summer 2007 issue of Folklore magazine. He describes how "Reverend Pike, an Englishman and a bachelor decided to build a new church and it was to be the same design and construction as one in England that had been lost to the sea due to coastal erosion." The chimes and font were from this church and were installed in the Heward church. When the church was finally closed, the chimes and font were sent to a church in Regina.

== Demographics ==
Population history (1981–2016)
Year	Pop.	±%
1981	54	—
1986	39	−27.8%
1991	25	−35.9%
1996	26	+4.0%
2001	25	−3.8%
2006	20	−20.0%
2011	40	+100.0%
2016	44	+10.0%
Source: Statistics Canada via Saskatchewan Bureau of Statistics

In the 2021 Census of Population conducted by Statistics Canada, Heward had a population of 30 living in 15 of its 20 total private dwellings, a change of −31.8% from its 2016 population of 44. With a land area of 0.92 km^{2} (0.36 sq mi), it had a population density of 32.6/km^{2} (84.5/sq mi) in 2021.

In the 2016 Census of Population, the Village of Heward recorded a population of 44 living in 19 of its 20 total private dwellings, a 9.1% change from its 2011 population of 40. With a land area of 0.99 km^{2} (0.38 sq mi), it had a population density of 44.4/km^{2} (115.1/sq mi) in 2016.

== See also ==
- List of communities in Saskatchewan
- List of villages in Saskatchewan
