= Rural Municipality of Fillmore No. 96 =

Rural municipality in Saskatchewan, Canada

Fillmore No. 96
- Rural municipality
- Rural Municipality of Fillmore No. 96
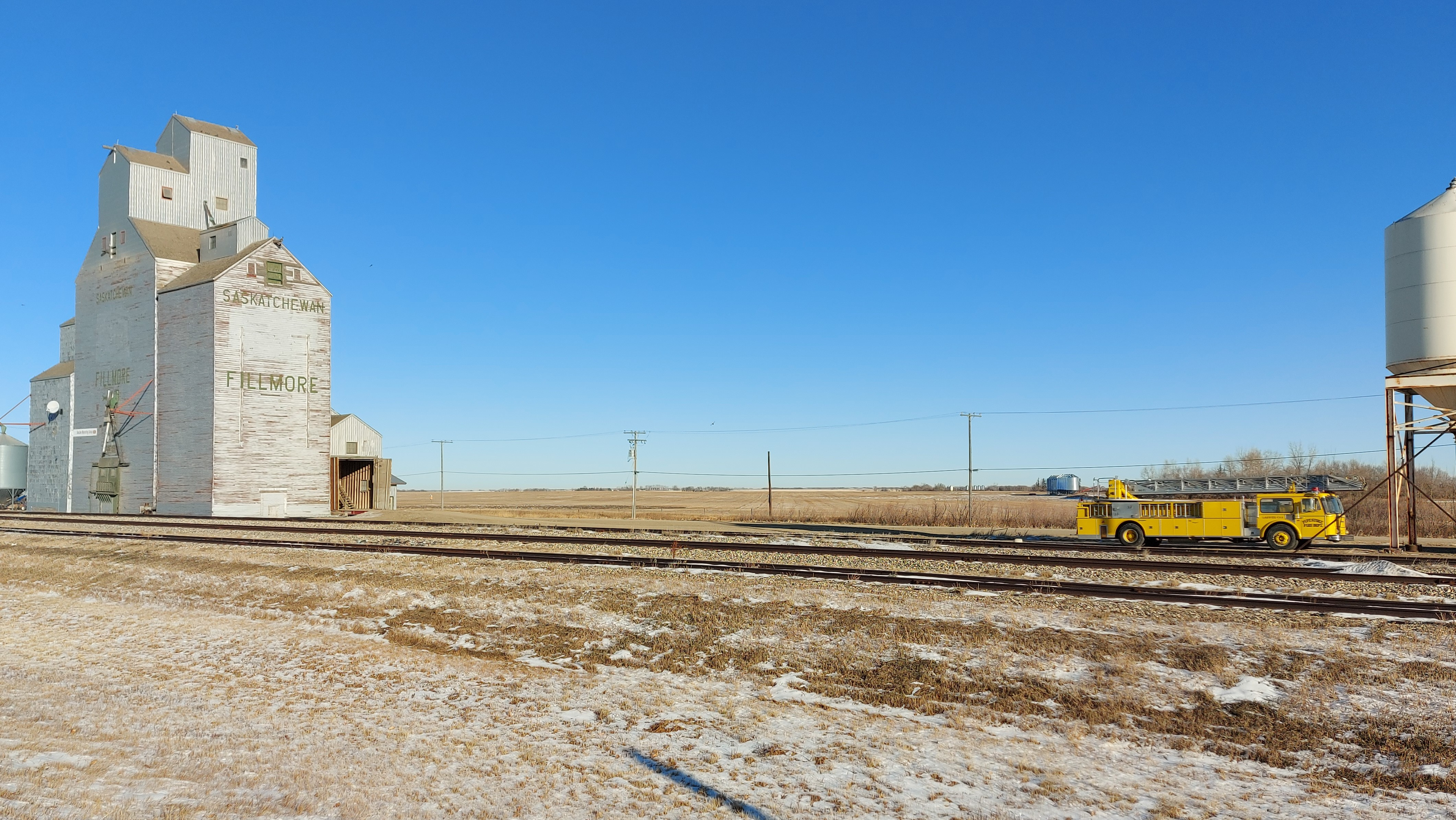
- Grain elevator and fire truck in Fillmore

- Location of the RM of Fillmore No. 96 in Saskatchewan
- Coordinates: 49.904°N 103.427°W
- Country: Canada
- Province: Saskatchewan
- Census division: 2
- SARM division: 1
- Federal riding: Souris—Moose Mountain
- Provincial riding: Cannington; Moosomin; Weyburn-Big Muddy
- Formed: December 13, 1909

Government
  - Reeve: Winston van Staveren
  - Governing body: RM of Fillmore No. 96 Council
  - Administrator: Vernna Wiggins
  - Office location: Fillmore

Area (2016)
  - Land: 828.33 km^{2} (319.82 sq mi)

Population (2016)
  - Total: 223
  - Density: 0.3/km^{2} (0.78/sq mi)
- Time zone: CST
  - Summer (DST): CST
- Postal code: S0G 1N0
- Area codes: 306 and 639
- Website: Official website

The Rural Municipality of Fillmore No. 96 (2016 population: 223) is a rural municipality (RM) in the Canadian province of Saskatchewan within Census Division No. 2 and SARM Division No. 1. It is located in the south-east portion of the province along Highway 33.

== History ==
The RM of Fillmore No. 96 incorporated as a rural municipality on December 13, 1909. It was previously Local Improvement District No. 6–E–2.

== Geography ==
=== Communities and localities ===
The following urban municipalities are surrounded by the RM.

Villages

- Creelman
- Fillmore
- Osage

The following unincorporated communities are within the RM.

Localities

- Huronville

== Osage Wildlife Refuge ==
Osage Wildlife Refuge (49.9334°N 103.5505°W) is a wildlife conservation area in the RM of Fillmore, about 4.8 kilometres (3.0 mi) south-east of Osage along Highway 33.

== Demographics ==
Population history (1981–2016)
Year	Pop.	±%
1981	477	—
1986	454	−4.8%
1991	422	−7.0%
1996	344	−18.5%
2001	308	−10.5%
2006	256	−16.9%
2011	255	−0.4%
2016	223	−12.5%
Source: Statistics Canada via Saskatchewan Bureau of Statistics

In the 2021 Census of Population conducted by Statistics Canada, the RM of Fillmore No. 96 had a population of 224 living in 105 of its 124 total private dwellings, a change of 0.4% from its 2016 population of 223. With a land area of 815.57 km^{2} (314.89 sq mi), it had a population density of 0.3/km^{2} (0.7/sq mi) in 2021.

In the 2016 Census of Population, the RM of Fillmore No. 96 recorded a population of 223 living in 98 of its 119 total private dwellings, a −12.5% change from its 2011 population of 255. With a land area of 828.33 km^{2} (319.82 sq mi), it had a population density of 0.3/km^{2} (0.7/sq mi) in 2016.

== Government ==
The RM of Fillmore No. 96 is governed by an elected municipal council and an appointed administrator that meets on the second Wednesday of every month. The reeve of the RM is Winston van Staveren while its administrator is Vernna Wiggins. The RM's office is located in Fillmore.

== Transportation ==
Rail

- Souris-Arcola-Regina Section Canadian Pacific Railway (CPR) —serves Stoughton, Heward, Creelman, Fillmore, Osage, Tyvan, Francis, and Sedley

Roads

- Highway 33—serves Fillmore and Village of Osage
- Highway 606—serves Fillmore
- Highway 711—serves the Village of Osage
- Highway 619—serves the Village of Osage

== Gallery ==
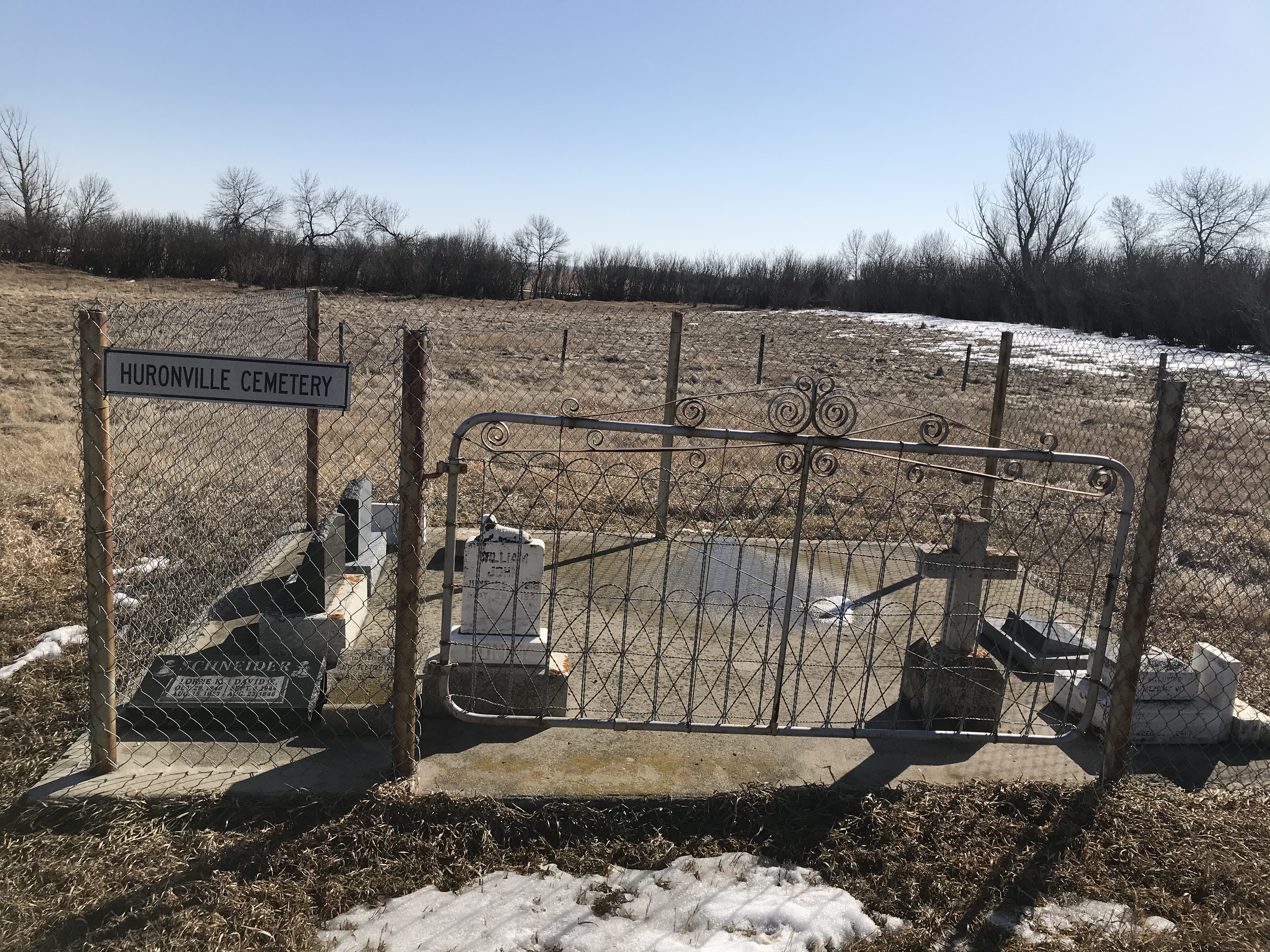
Cemetery in Huronville

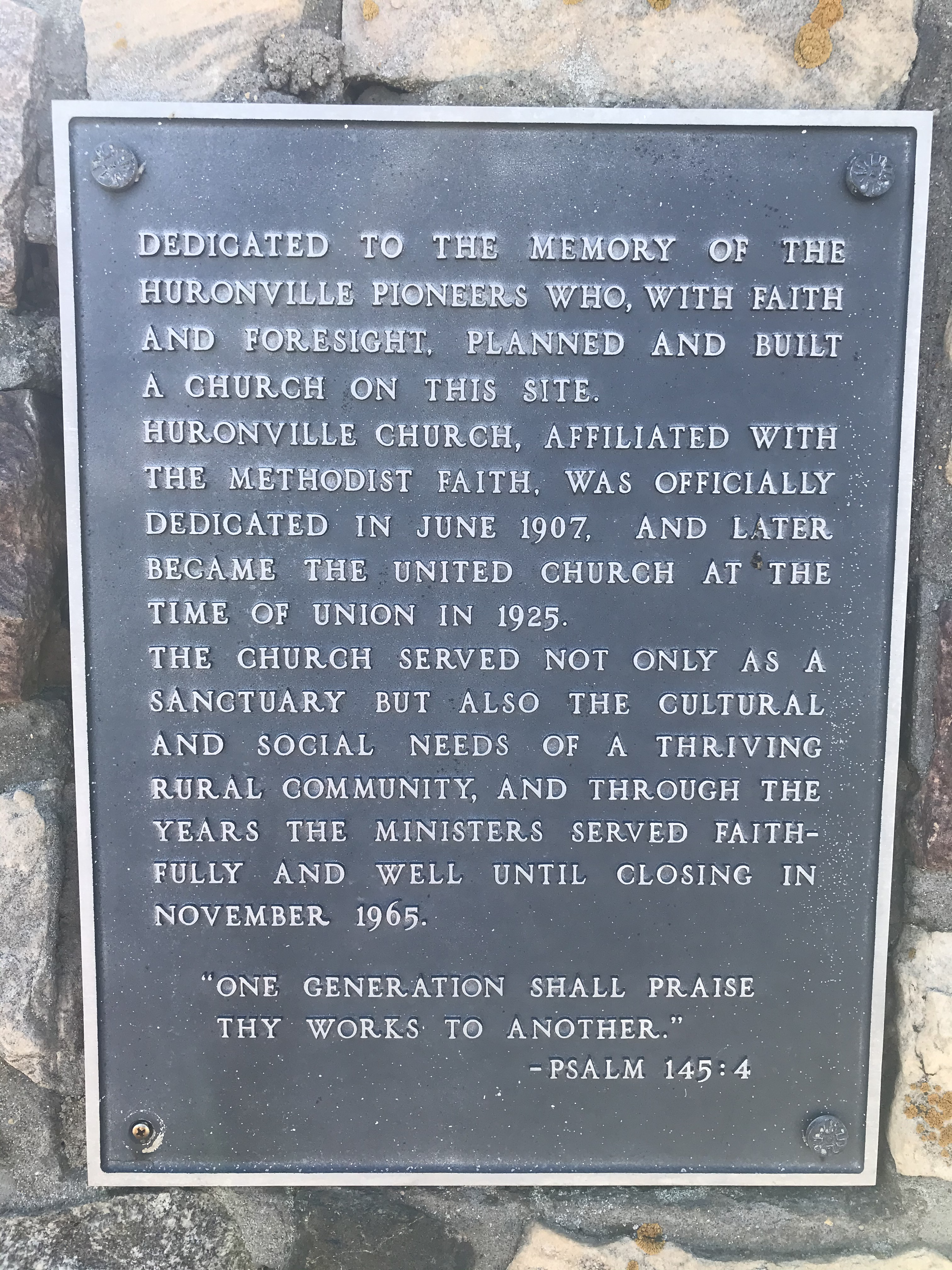
Plaque in Huronville

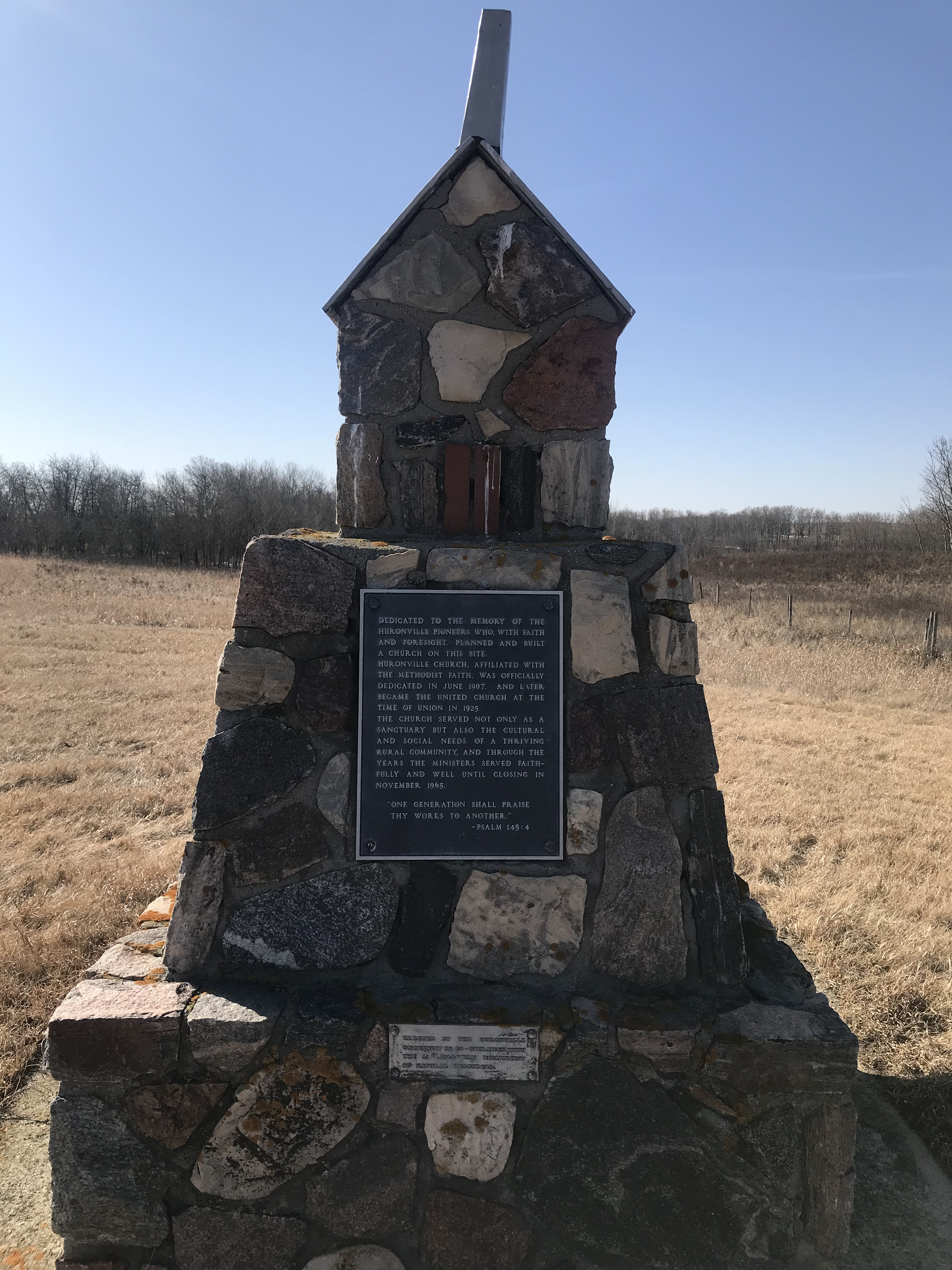
Cairn in Huronville

== See also ==
- List of rural municipalities in Saskatchewan
