= Rural Municipality of Francis No. 127 =

Rural municipality in Saskatchewan, Canada

Francis No. 127
- Rural municipality
- Rural Municipality of Francis No. 127
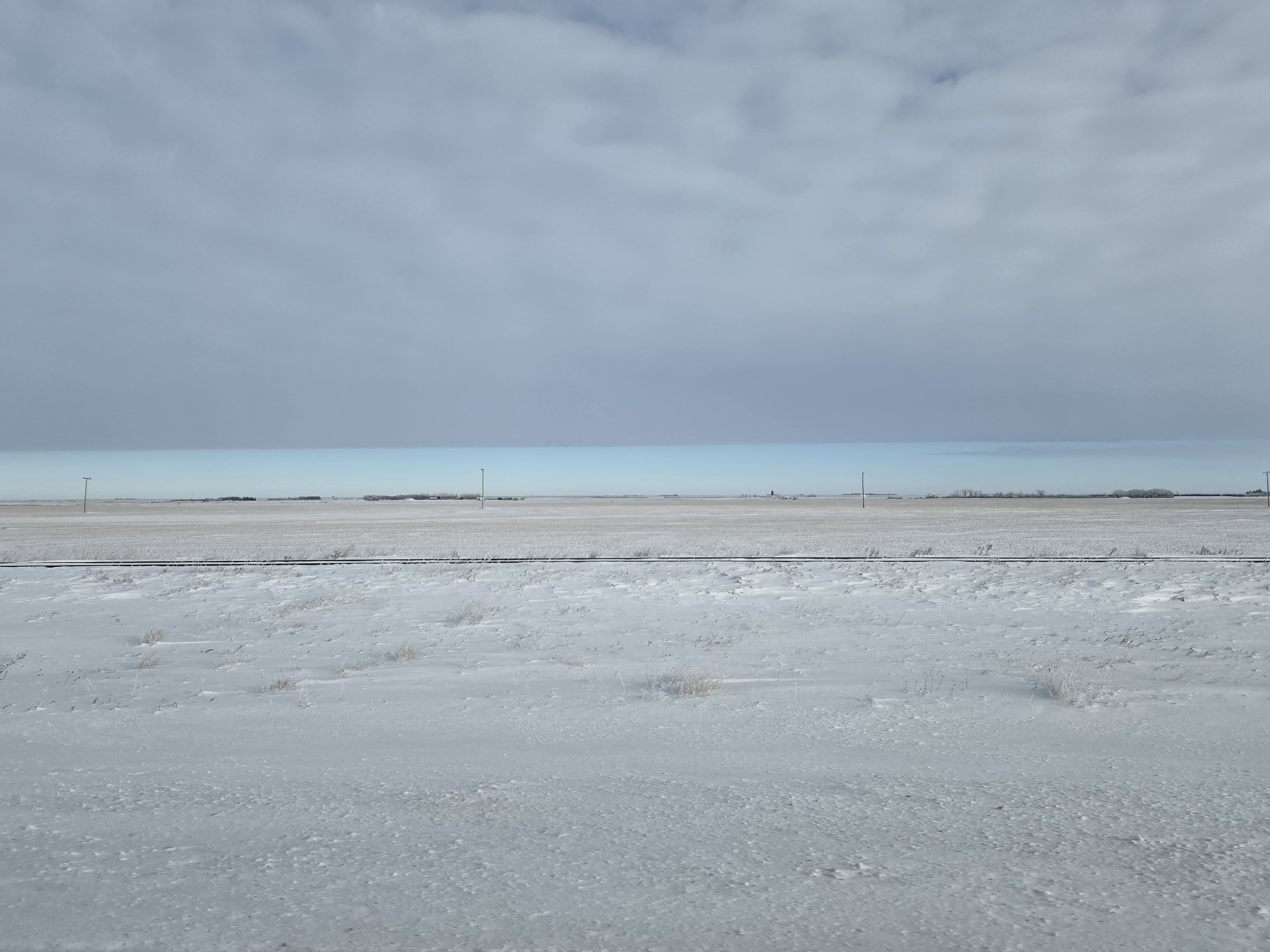
- RM of Francis No. 127

- Location of the RM of Francis No. 127 in Saskatchewan
- Coordinates: 50.224°N 103.875°W
- Country: Canada
- Province: Saskatchewan
- Census division: 6
- SARM division: 1
- Federal riding: Souris—Moose Mountain
- Provincial riding: Indian Head-Milestone; Moosomin
- Formed: December 13, 1909

Government
  - Reeve: Morley Richard
  - Governing body: RM of Francis No. 127 Council
  - Administrator: Shala Kanasevich
  - Office location: Francis

Area (2016)
  - Land: 1,106.79 km^{2} (427.33 sq mi)

Population (2016)
  - Total: 674
  - Density: 0.6/km^{2} (1.6/sq mi)
- Time zone: CST
  - Summer (DST): CST
- Postal code: S0G 1V0
- Area codes: 306 and 639
- Website: Official website

The Rural Municipality of Francis No. 127 (2016 population: 674) is a rural municipality (RM) in the Canadian province of Saskatchewan within Census Division No. 6 and SARM Division No. 1. It is located in the southeast portion of the province.

== History ==
The RM of Francis No. 127 incorporated as a rural municipality on December 13, 1909.

== Geography ==
=== Communities and localities ===
The following urban municipalities are surrounded by the RM.

Towns

- Francis

Villages

- Odessa
- Sedley
- Vibank

== Demographics ==
Population history (1981–2016)
Year	Pop.	±%
1981	862	—
1986	840	−2.6%
1991	803	−4.4%
1996	805	+0.2%
2001	741	−8.0%
2006	672	−9.3%
2011	676	+0.6%
2016	674	−0.3%
Source: Statistics Canada via Saskatchewan Bureau of Statistics

In the 2021 Census of Population conducted by Statistics Canada, the RM of Francis No. 127 had a population of 701 living in 253 of its 272 total private dwellings, a change of 4% from its 2016 population of 674. With a land area of 1,077.36 km^{2} (415.97 sq mi), it had a population density of 0.7/km^{2} (1.7/sq mi) in 2021.

In the 2016 Census of Population, the RM of Francis No. 127 recorded a population of 674 living in 252 of its 264 total private dwellings, a −0.3% change from its 2011 population of 676. With a land area of 1,106.79 km^{2} (427.33 sq mi), it had a population density of 0.6/km^{2} (1.6/sq mi) in 2016.

== Government ==
The RM of Francis No. 127 is governed by an elected municipal council and an appointed administrator that meets on the second Thursday of every month. The reeve of the RM is Richard Morley while its administrator is Shala Kanasevich. The RM's office is located at PT NE 32 14 14 W2.
