= Francis, Saskatchewan =

Town in Saskatchewan, Canada

- Town
- Francis, Saskatchewan

- Location of Francis in Saskatchewan Francis, Saskatchewan (Canada)
- Coordinates: 50.1017°N 103.866°W
- Country: Canada
- Province: Saskatchewan
- Census division: 6
- Rural Municipality: Francis
- Post office founded: 1904
- Incorporated (Village): 1904
- Incorporated (Town): 1906

Government
  - Mayor: Kim Connery
  - Administrator: Melody Dixon-Lye
  - Governing body: Francis Town Council
  - MLA Moosomin: Steven Bonk
  - MP Souris—Moose Mountain: Robert Kitchen

Area
  - Total: 0.59 km^{2} (0.23 sq mi)

Population (2011)
  - Total: 176
  - Density: 297.4/km^{2} (770/sq mi)
- Time zone: CST
- Postal code: S0G 1V0
- Area code: 306
- Highways: Highway 33, Highway 35, Highway 708

Francis is a town in the province of Saskatchewan in Canada. The town is 67 km southeast of Regina and 50 km north of Weyburn at the intersection of Highway 33 and Highway 35.

== Demographics ==
In the 2021 Census of Population conducted by Statistics Canada, Francis had a population of 182 living in 79 of its 92 total private dwellings, a change of −16.1% from its 2016 population of 217. With a land area of 0.62 km^{2} (0.24 sq mi), it had a population density of 293.5/km^{2} (760.3/sq mi) in 2021.

Canada census – Francis community profile

	2021	2016	2011
Population	182 (-16.1% from 2016)	217 (+23.3% from 2011)	176 (+18.9% from 2006)
Land area	0.62 km^{2} (0.24 sq mi)	0.59 km^{2} (0.23 sq mi)	0.59 km^{2} (0.23 sq mi)
Population density	295.2/km^{2} (765/sq mi)	366.7/km^{2} (950/sq mi)	297.4/km^{2} (770/sq mi)
Median age	39.6 (M: 39.6, F: 40.0)	36.8 (M: 35.5, F: 38.0)	39.2 (M: 42.0, F: 35.5)
Private dwellings	92 (total) 79 (occupied)	94 (total)	90 (total)
Median household income

References: 2021 2016 2011

== See also ==
- Francis (electoral district)
- List of communities in Saskatchewan
- List of towns in Saskatchewan
