= Creelman, Saskatchewan =

Village in Saskatchewan, Canada

Creelman
- Village
- Village of Creelman
- Village of Creelman

- Location of Creelman in Saskatchewan Creelman (Canada)
- Coordinates: 49.830°N 103.261°W
- Country: Canada
- Province: Saskatchewan
- Region: Southeast
- Census division: 2
- Rural Municipality: Fillmore No. 96

Government
  - Type: Municipal
  - Governing body: Creelman Village Council
  - Mayor: Gordon
  - Administrator: Vernna Wiggins

Area
  - Total: 1.14 km^{2} (0.44 sq mi)

Population (2021)
  - Total: 103
  - Density: 90.4/km^{2} (234/sq mi)
- Time zone: UTC-6 (CST)
- Postal code: S0G 0X0
- Area code: 306
- Highways: Highway 33; Highway 701
- Railways: Canadian Pacific Railway

Creelman (2021 population: 103) is a village in the Canadian province of Saskatchewan within the RM of Fillmore No. 96 and Census Division No. 2. The village lies 118 km southeast of the city of Regina, on Highway 33.

== History ==
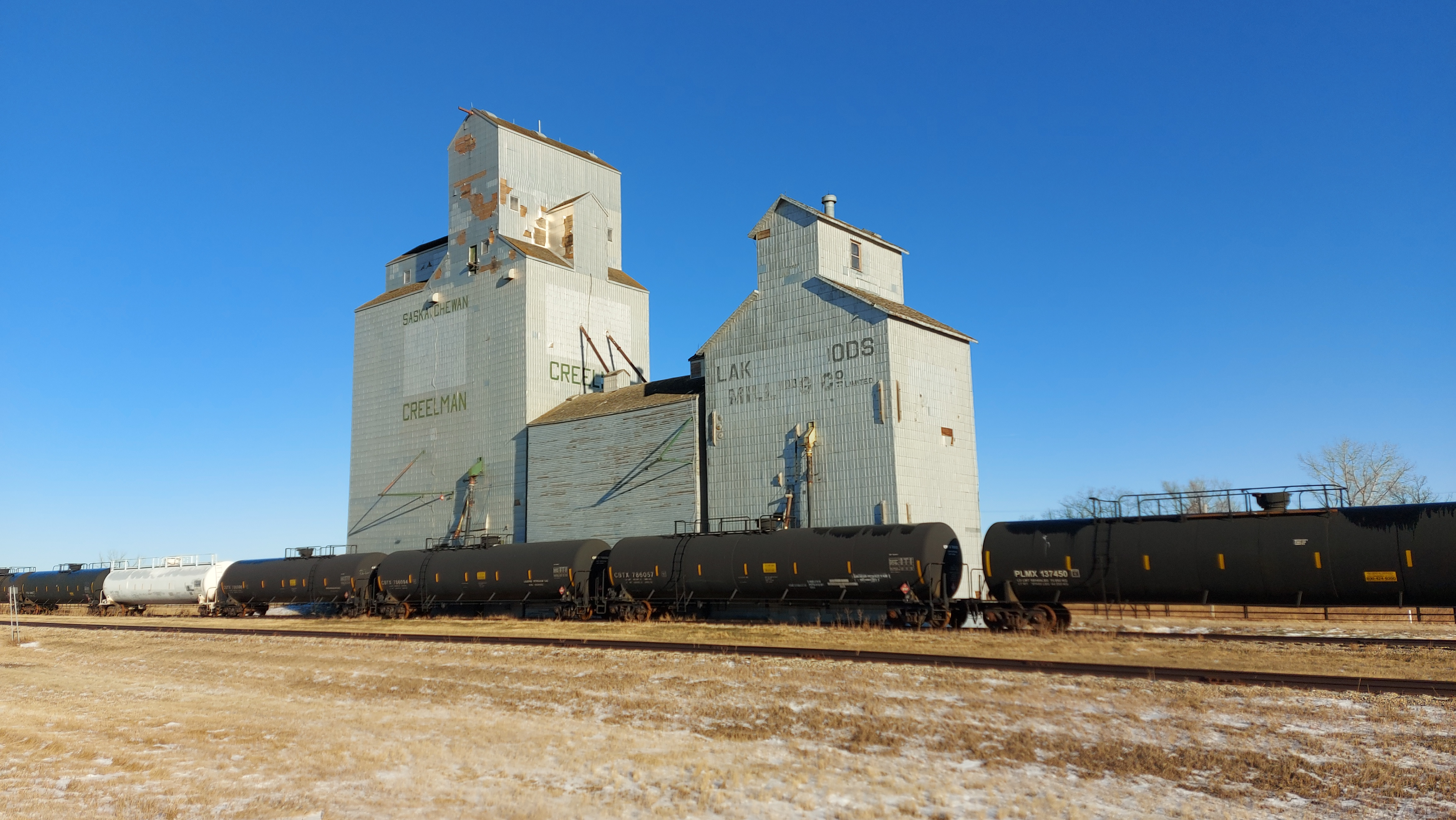
Grain elevator and oil cars in Creelman

The Canadian Pacific Railway (CPR) constructed a line in a southeasterly direction from Regina. Completed in 1904, the line was soon lined with a series of small communities and post offices. As early as 1903 a townsite was laid out on the line which locals decided to name Hazel. However, officials with the CPR had other ideas and with the railway's completion they renamed the tiny community Creelman after the company's solicitor A.R. Creelman (that same year a post office was opened at the site). Gradually Creelman grew to become a thriving centre for the local farmers and would become an important market and social centre for the surrounding farming community. Creelman incorporated as a village on April 6, 1906.

== Demographics ==
Population history (1971–2021)
Year	Pop.	±%
1971	197	—
1976	178	−9.6%
1981	184	+3.4%
1986	167	−9.2%
1991	134	−19.8%
1996	128	−4.5%
2001	85	−33.6%
2006	81	−4.7%
2011	115	+42.0%
2016	113	−1.7%
2021	103	−8.8%
Source: Statistics Canada via Saskatchewan Bureau of Statistics

In the 2021 Census of Population conducted by Statistics Canada, Creelman had a population of 103 living in 47 of its 62 total private dwellings, a change of −8.8% from its 2016 population of 113. With a land area of 1.35 km^{2} (0.52 sq mi), it had a population density of 76.3/km^{2} (197.6/sq mi) in 2021.

In the 2016 Census of Population, the Village of Creelman recorded a population of 113 living in 56 of its 75 total private dwellings, a −1.8% change from its 2011 population of 115. With a land area of 1.14 km^{2} (0.44 sq mi), it had a population density of 99.1/km^{2} (256.7/sq mi) in 2016.

== Notable people ==
- Morris Mott, played in the NHL with the California Golden Seals and Winnipeg Jets

== See also ==
- List of communities in Saskatchewan
- List of villages in Saskatchewan
- List of francophone communities in Saskatchewan
