= Tyvan, Saskatchewan =

Community in Saskatchewan, Canada

Tyvan
- Unincorporated community
- Location within Saskatchewan Location within Canada
- Coordinates: 50.032°N 103.739°W
- Country: Canada
- Province: Saskatchewan
- Region: Southeast
- Census division: 2
- Rural Municipality: Wellington No. 97
- Established: 1904
- Dissolved: July 1, 1936
- Time zone: CST
- Area code: 306
- Highways: Highway 33
- Railways: Canadian Pacific Railway

Tyvan is an unincorporated community in the Rural Municipality of Wellington No. 97, Saskatchewan, Canada. It is located on Highway 33, approximately 79 km southeast of the city of Regina. It previously held the status of a village until July 1, 1936.

== See also ==
- List of communities in Saskatchewan
