= Cedoux =

Community in Saskatchewan, Canada

- Unincorporated community
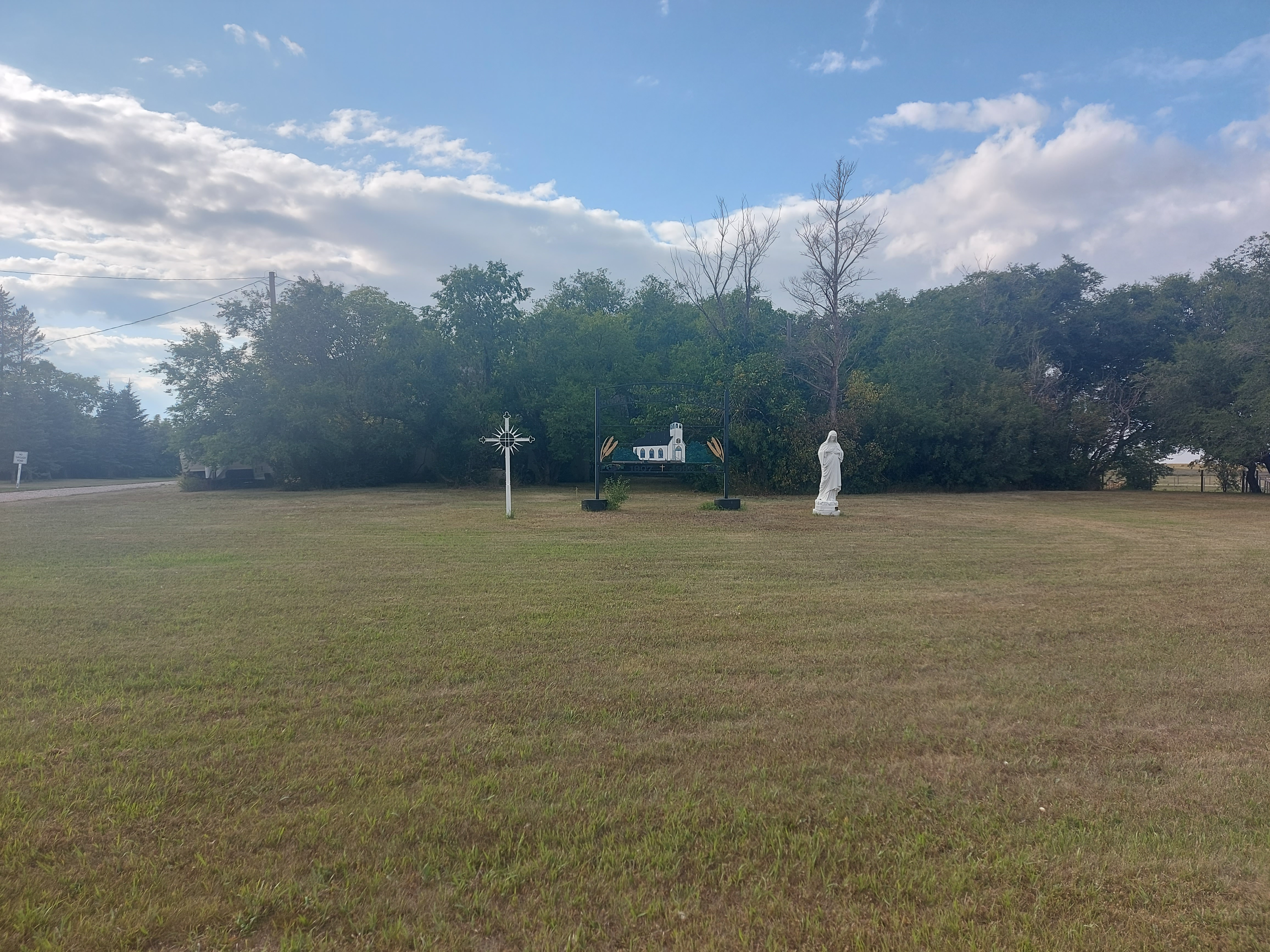
- Location of the Holy Trinity Roman Catholic Church from 1907 to 1990

- Location within Saskatchewan Location within Canada
- Coordinates: 49.884°N 103.882°W
- Country: Canada
- Province: Saskatchewan
- Region: Southeast
- Census division: 2
- Rural Municipality: Wellington No. 97
- Established: 1902
- Dissolved (Village): July 21, 1913

Government
  - Governing body: Wellington No. 97 Council
- Time zone: CST
- Area code: 306
- Highways: Highway 35
- Railways: Canadian Pacific Railway

Cedoux is an unincorporated community in the Rural Municipality of Wellington No. 97 in the province of Saskatchewan, Canada. It held village status prior to July 21, 1913. Cedoux is located on Highway 35, approximately 25 kilometres (16 mi) north of the city of Weyburn and approximately 91 kilometres (57 mi) southeast of Regina.

== History ==
The colonization of the community of Cedoux, situated 15 miles north of Weyburn, began to form in 1902 with the arrival of a few Polish and Ukrainian settlers. The official date that Cedoux was named is unknown. It was believed at first to have been named the same time as Cedoux Post Office, April 1, 1905, but a receipt shows it as having possibly been named as early as July 9, 1904. Cedoux became a village on July 21, 1913.
