= Fillmore, Saskatchewan =

Village in Saskatchewan, Canada

Fillmore
- Hamlet
- Village of Fillmore
- Downtown Fillmore

- Location of Fillmore in Saskatchewan Fillmore (Canada)
- Coordinates: 49.878°N 103.426°W
- Country: Canada
- Province: Saskatchewan
- Region: South-east
- Census division: 2
- Rural Municipality: Fillmore

Government
  - Governing body: Fillmore Village Council
  - Mayor: Tracey Kyrylchuk
  - Administrator: Nicole Hanson

Area
  - Total: 1.33 km^{2} (0.51 sq mi)

Population (2016)
  - Total: 311
  - Density: 234.7/km^{2} (608/sq mi)
- Time zone: UTC-6 (CST)
- Postal code: S0G 1N0
- Area code: 306
- Highways: Highway 33 Highway 606

Fillmore (2016 population: 311) is a village in the Canadian province of Saskatchewan within the Rural Municipality of Fillmore No. 96 and Census Division No. 2.

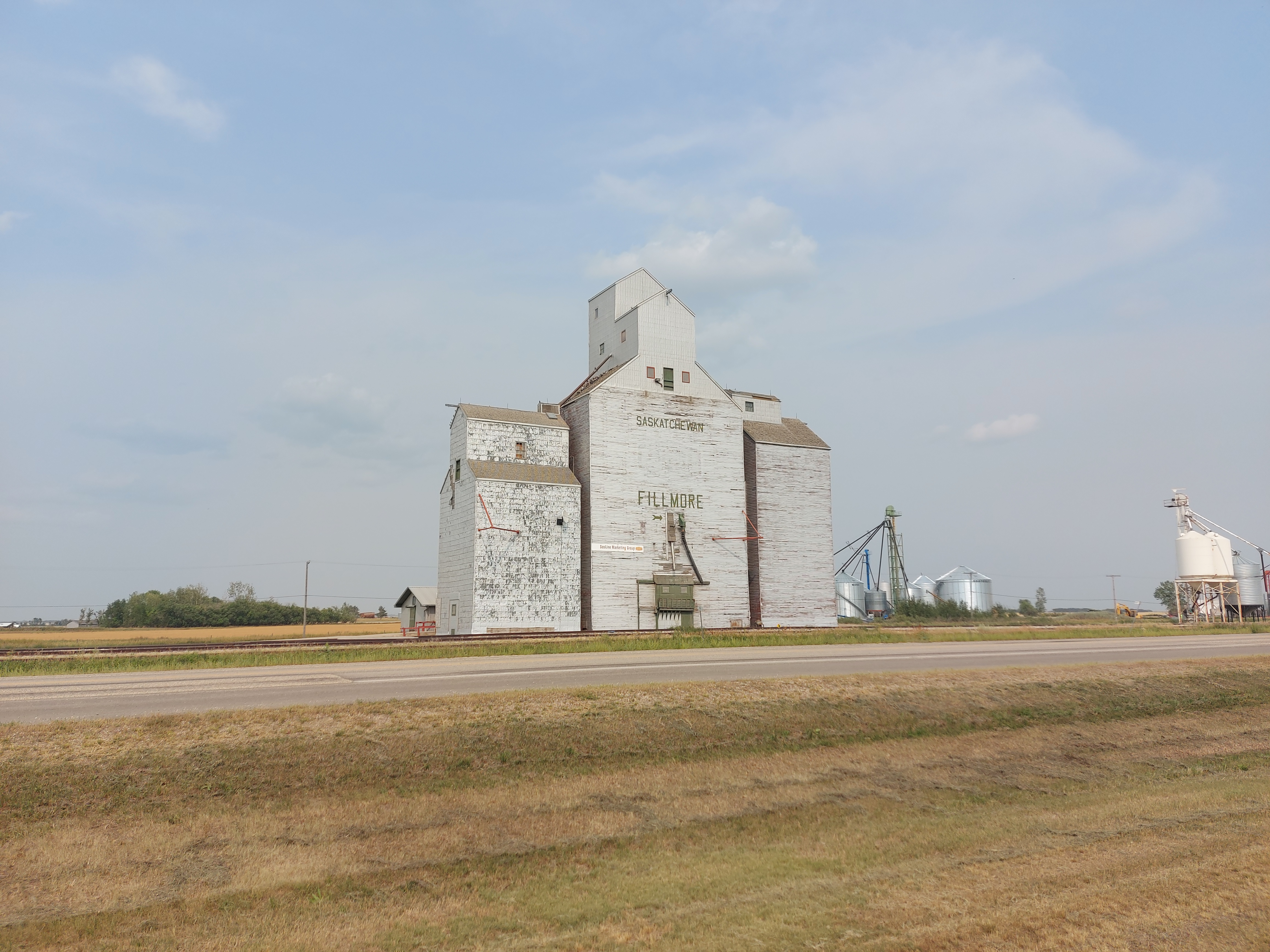
Grain elevator in Fillmore

== History ==
Fillmore incorporated as a village on June 10, 1905.

== Demographics ==
Population history (1981–2016)
Year	Pop.	±%
1981	396	—
1986	350	−11.6%
1991	328	−6.3%
1996	286	−12.8%
2001	246	−14.0%
2006	193	−21.5%
2011	255	+32.1%
2016	311	+22.0%
Source: Statistics Canada via Saskatchewan Bureau of Statistics

In the 2021 Census of Population conducted by Statistics Canada, Fillmore had a population of 282 living in 123 of its 149 total private dwellings, a change of −9.3% from its 2016 population of 311. With a land area of 1.32 km^{2} (0.51 sq mi), it had a population density of 213.6/km^{2} (553.3/sq mi) in 2021.

In the 2016 Census of Population, the Village of Fillmore recorded a population of 311 living in 129 of its 149 total private dwellings, a 18% change from its 2011 population of 255. With a land area of 1.33 km^{2} (0.51 sq mi), it had a population density of 233.8/km^{2} (605.6/sq mi) in 2016.

== See also ==
- List of communities in Saskatchewan
- List of villages in Saskatchewan
