= Rural Municipality of Wellington No. 97 =

Rural municipality in Saskatchewan, Canada

Wellington No. 97
- Rural municipality
- Rural Municipality of Wellington No. 97
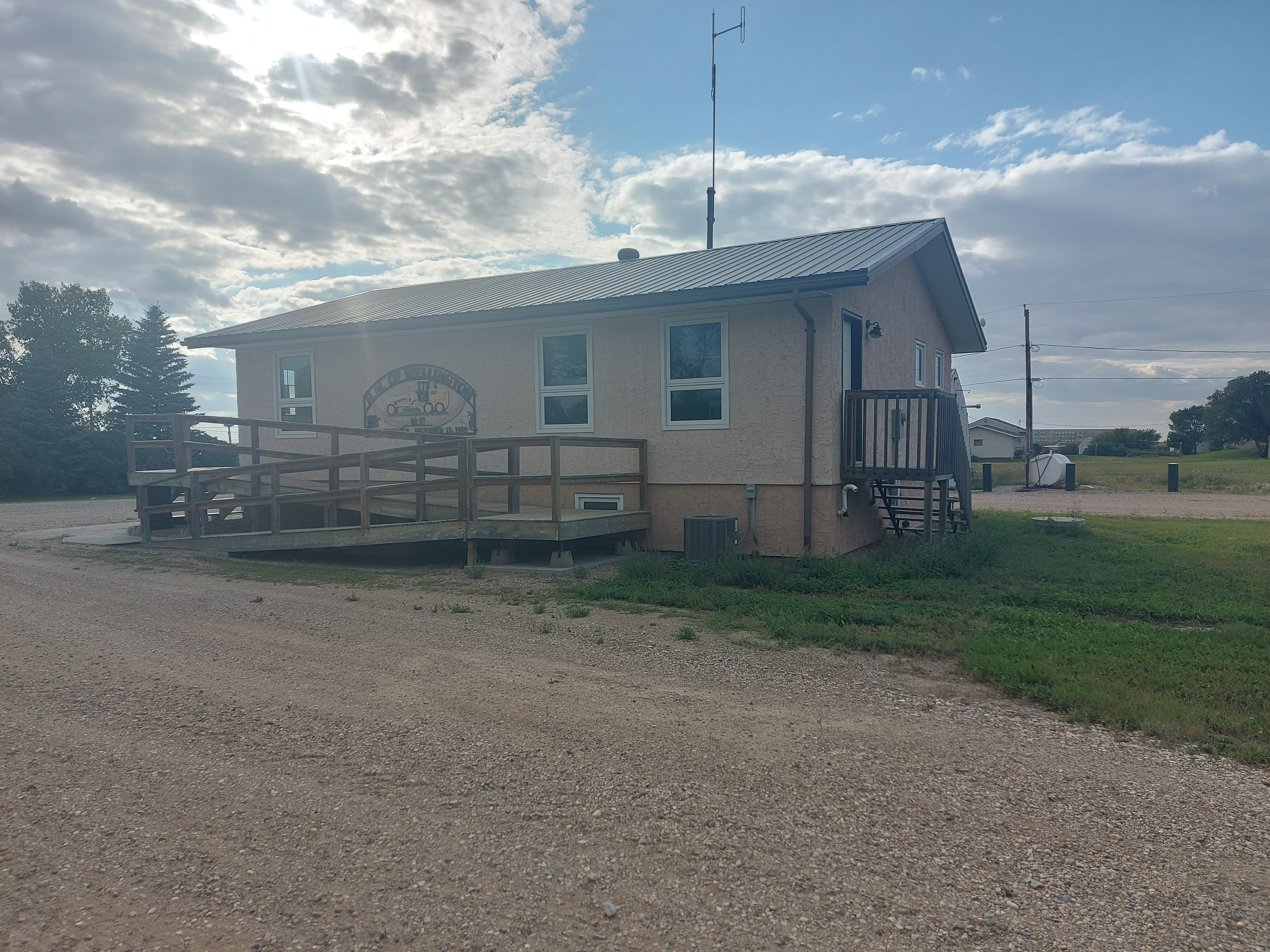
- RM of Wellington office in Cedoux

- Location of the RM of Wellington No. 97 in Saskatchewan
- Coordinates: 49.916°N 103.845°W
- Country: Canada
- Province: Saskatchewan
- Census division: 2
- SARM division: 1
- Federal riding: Souris—Moose Mountain
- Provincial riding: Moosomin; Weyburn-Big Muddy
- Formed: December 13, 1909

Government
  - Reeve: Kelly Schneider
  - Governing body: RM of Wellington No. 97 Council
  - Administrator: Heather Wawro
  - Office location: Cedoux

Area (2016)
  - Land: 838.68 km^{2} (323.82 sq mi)

Population (2016)
  - Total: 371
  - Density: 0.4/km^{2} (1.0/sq mi)
- Time zone: CST
  - Summer (DST): CST
- Postal code: S4H 3J9
- Area codes: 306 and 639

The Rural Municipality of Wellington No. 97 (2016 population: 371) is a rural municipality (RM) in the Canadian province of Saskatchewan within Census Division No. 2 and SARM Division No. 1. It is located in the southeast portion of the province.

== History ==
The RM of Wellington No. 97 incorporated as a rural municipality on December 13, 1909.

== Geography ==
=== Communities and localities ===
The following unincorporated communities are within the RM.

Localities

- Cedoux (dissolved as a village, July 21, 1913)
- Colfax
- Rainton
- Tyvan (dissolved as a village, July 1, 1936)

== Demographics ==
Population history (1981–2016)
| Year | Pop. | ±% |
|---|---|---|
| 1981 | 577 | — |
| 1986 | 525 | −9.0% |
| 1991 | 424 | −19.2% |
| 1996 | 403 | −5.0% |
| 2001 | 372 | −7.7% |
| 2006 | 357 | −4.0% |
| 2011 | 356 | −0.3% |
| 2016 | 371 | +4.2% |
Source: Statistics Canada via Saskatchewan Bureau of Statistics

In the 2021 Census of Population conducted by Statistics Canada, the RM of Wellington No. 97 had a population of 274 living in 119 of its 139 total private dwellings, a change of −26.1% from its 2016 population of 371. With a land area of 831.16 km^{2} (320.91 sq mi), it had a population density of 0.3/km^{2} (0.9/sq mi) in 2021.

In the 2016 Census of Population, the RM of Wellington No. 97 recorded a population of 371 living in 146 of its 155 total private dwellings, a 4.2% change from its 2011 population of 356. With a land area of 838.68 km^{2} (323.82 sq mi), it had a population density of 0.4/km^{2} (1.1/sq mi) in 2016.

== Government ==
The RM of Wellington No. 97 is governed by an elected municipal council and an appointed administrator that meets on the first Wednesday of every month. The reeve of the RM is Kelly Schneider while its administrator is Heather Wawro. The RM's office is located in Weyburn.

== See also ==
- List of rural municipalities in Saskatchewan
