= Rural Municipality of Tecumseh No. 65 =

Rural municipality in Saskatchewan, Canada

Tecumseh No. 65
- Rural municipality
- Rural Municipality of Tecumseh No. 65
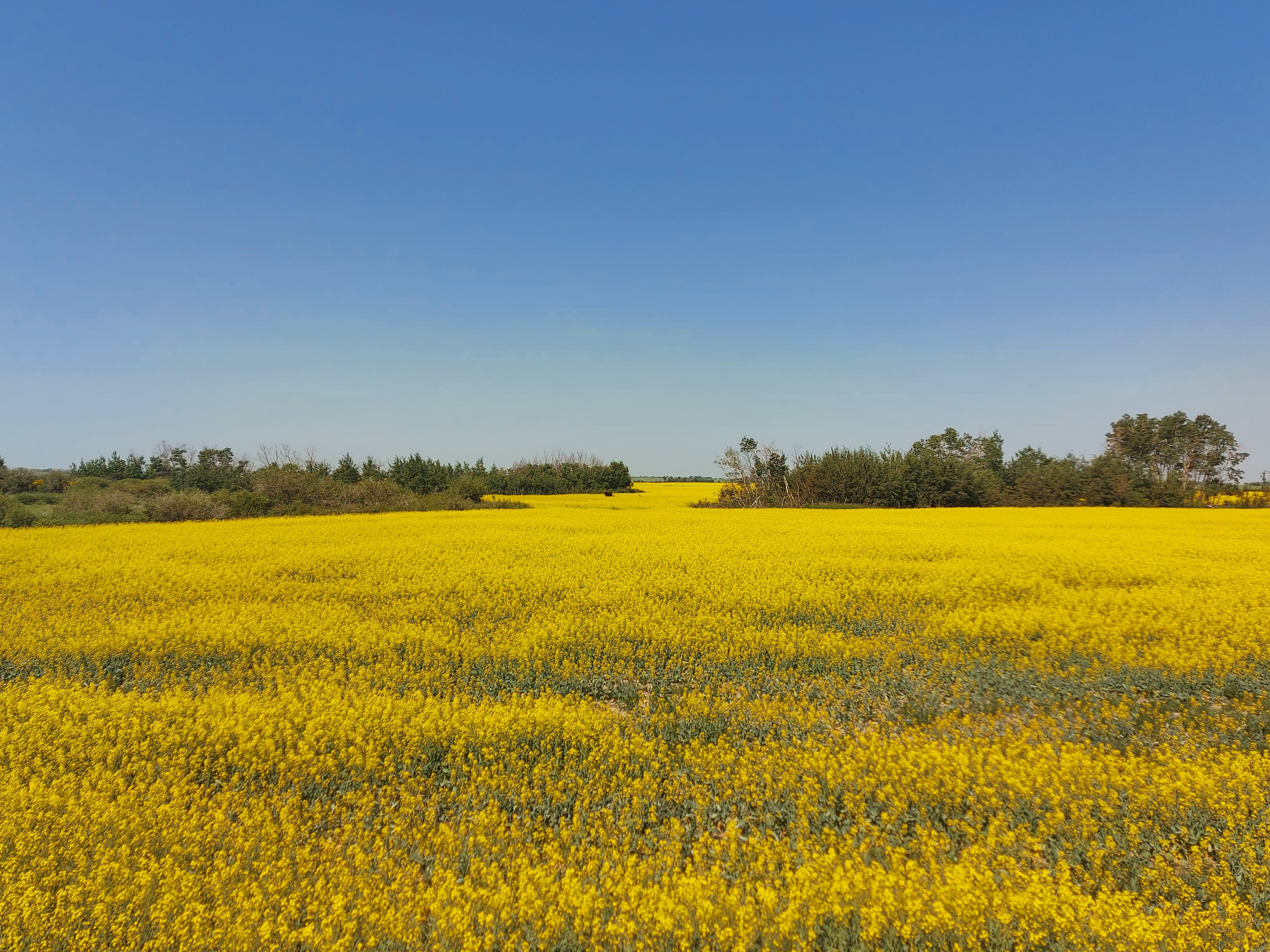
- Canola field in the RM of Tecumseh

- Location of the RM of Tecumseh No. 65 in Saskatchewan
- Coordinates: 49.649°N 103.026°W
- Country: Canada
- Province: Saskatchewan
- Census division: 1
- SARM division: 1
- Federal riding: Souris—Moose Mountain
- Provincial riding: Cannington
- Formed: December 13, 1909

Government
  - Reeve: Christy Goudy
  - Governing body: RM of Tecumseh No. 65 Council
  - Office location: Stoughton

Area (2016)
  - Land: 824.5 km^{2} (318.3 sq mi)

Population (2016)
  - Total: 271
  - Density: 0.3/km^{2} (0.78/sq mi)
- Time zone: CST
  - Summer (DST): CST
- Postal code: S0G 4T0
- Area codes: 306 and 639

The Rural Municipality of Tecumseh No. 65 (2016 population: 271) is a rural municipality (RM) in the Canadian province of Saskatchewan within Census Division No. 1 and SARM Division No. 1. It is located in the southeast portion of the province.

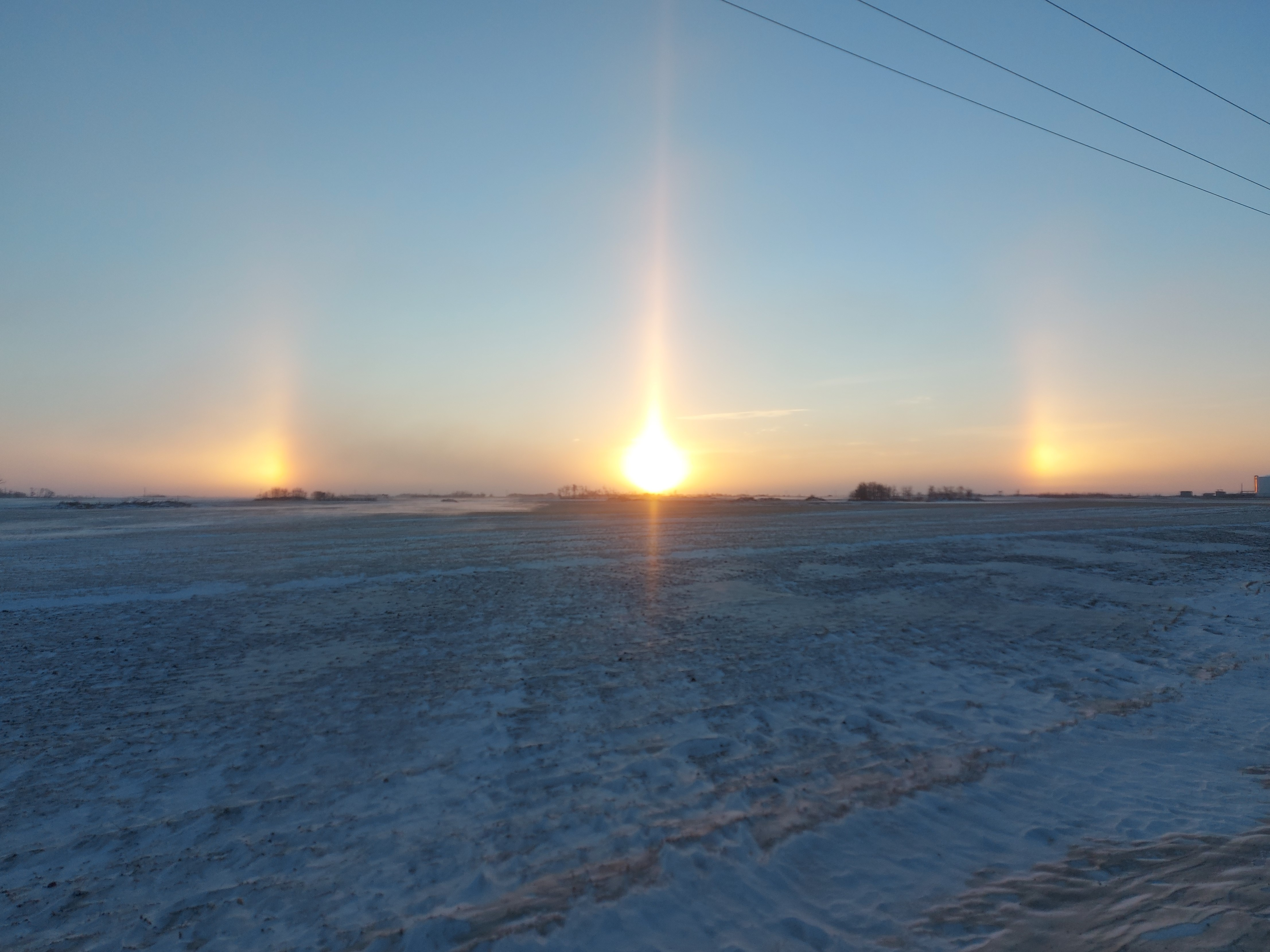
A sun dog on Christmas Eve 2021, south-west of Stoughton

== History ==
The RM of Tecumseh No. 65 incorporated as a rural municipality on December 13, 1909.

== Geography ==
=== Communities and localities ===
The following urban municipalities are surrounded by the RM.

Towns

- Stoughton

Villages

- Forget
- Heward

== Demographics ==
Population history (1981–2016)
Year	Pop.	±%
1981	510	—
1986	456	−10.6%
1991	383	−16.0%
1996	359	−6.3%
2001	316	−12.0%
2006	270	−14.6%
2011	270	+0.0%
2016	271	+0.4%
Source: Statistics Canada via Saskatchewan Bureau of Statistics

In the 2021 Census of Population conducted by Statistics Canada, the RM of Tecumseh No. 65 had a population of 255 living in 105 of its 130 total private dwellings, a change of −5.9% from its 2016 population of 271. With a land area of 798.92 km^{2} (308.46 sq mi), it had a population density of 0.3/km^{2} (0.8/sq mi) in 2021.

In the 2016 Census of Population, the RM of Tecumseh No. 65 recorded a population of 271 living in 110 of its 126 total private dwellings, a 0.4% change from its 2011 population of 270. With a land area of 824.5 km^{2} (318.3 sq mi), it had a population density of 0.3/km^{2} (0.9/sq mi) in 2016.

== Government ==
The RM of Tecumseh No. 65 is governed by an elected municipal council and an appointed administrator that meets on the second Wednesday of every month. The reeve of the RM is Zandra Slater while its administrator is Alysson Slater. The RM's office is located in Stoughton.

== See also ==
- List of rural municipalities in Saskatchewan
