= Stoughton, Saskatchewan =

Town in Saskatchewan, Canada

Stoughton
- Town
- Aerial view (2026)
- Motto: Crossroads of friendship
- Location of Stoughton in Saskatchewan Stoughton (Canada)
- Coordinates: 49.675°N 103.037°W
- Country: Canada
- Province: Saskatchewan
- Census division: 1
- Rural Municipality: Tecumseh
- Post office founded: 1901

Government
  - Mayor: Stefan Clark
  - Town Manager: Danielle Creusot-Hoffman
  - Governing body: Stoughton Town Council

Area
  - Land: 3.41 km^{2} (1.32 sq mi)

Population (2021)
  - Total: 652
  - Density: 189/km^{2} (490/sq mi)
- Time zone: CST
- Postal code: S0G 4T0
- Area code: 306
- Highways: Highway 13 Highway 33 Highway 47
- Website: http://stoughtonsk.ca

Stoughton (/ˈstaʊtən/) is a town in Saskatchewan, Canada. In 2011 it had a population of 649. Stoughton was originally called New Hope. The settlement of New Hope was barely three years old when the Canadian Pacific Railway (CPR) arrived in this part of the province in 1904. The CPR chose a location a little to the south for its closest depot, which it called Stoughton. The community of New Hope soon moved to join it.

Stoughton used to have its own small police service, which was aptly named the Stoughton Police Service. It no longer exists and now the Royal Canadian Mounted Police (RCMP) provide policing services to the town and surrounding areas.

Stoughton is approximately 142 kilometres (88 mi) southeast of Regina at the terminus for Highway 33, which is the longest straight road in Canada, and the fifth longest in the world. It is also the administrative headquarters of the Ocean Man First Nations band government.

The town is served by Highway 13, Highway 33, and Highway 47.

== Demographics ==
In the 2021 Census of Population conducted by Statistics Canada, Stoughton had a population of 652 living in 314 of its 378 total private dwellings, a change of 0.5% from its 2016 population of 649. With a land area of 3.45 km^{2} (1.33 sq mi), it had a population density of 189.0/km^{2} (489.5/sq mi) in 2021.

Canada census – Stoughton, Saskatchewan community profile

	2016	2011
Population	649 (-6.5% from 2011)	694 (6.3% from 2006)
Land area	3.74 km^{2} (1.44 sq mi)	3.41 km^{2} (1.32 sq mi)
Population density	173.4/km^{2} (449/sq mi)	203.2/km^{2} (526/sq mi)
Median age	47.8 (M: 48.1, F: 47.7)	43.4 (M: 42.4, F: 44.4)
Private dwellings	337 (total)	325 (total)
Median household income

References: 2016 2011

== Gallery ==
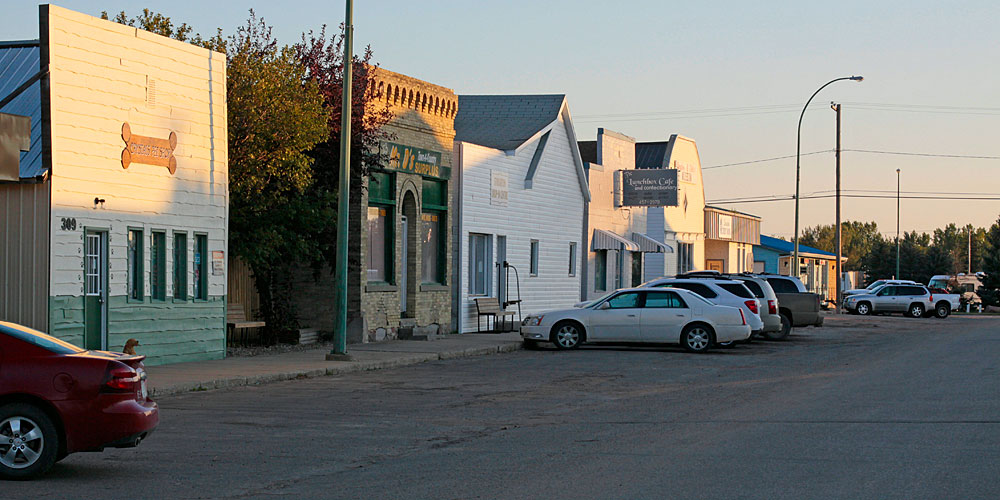
Main Street

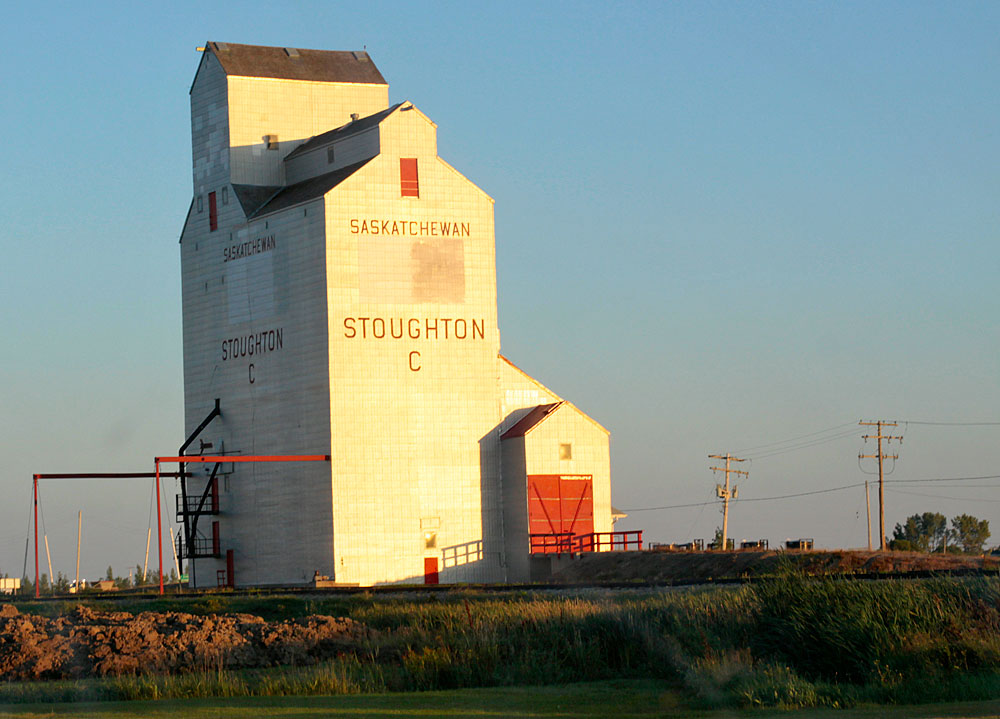
Grain elevator

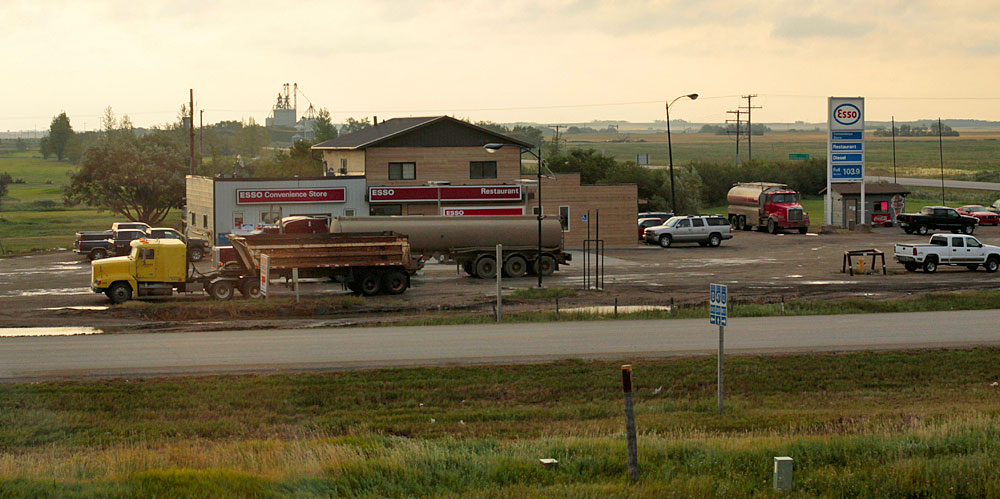
Rest stop

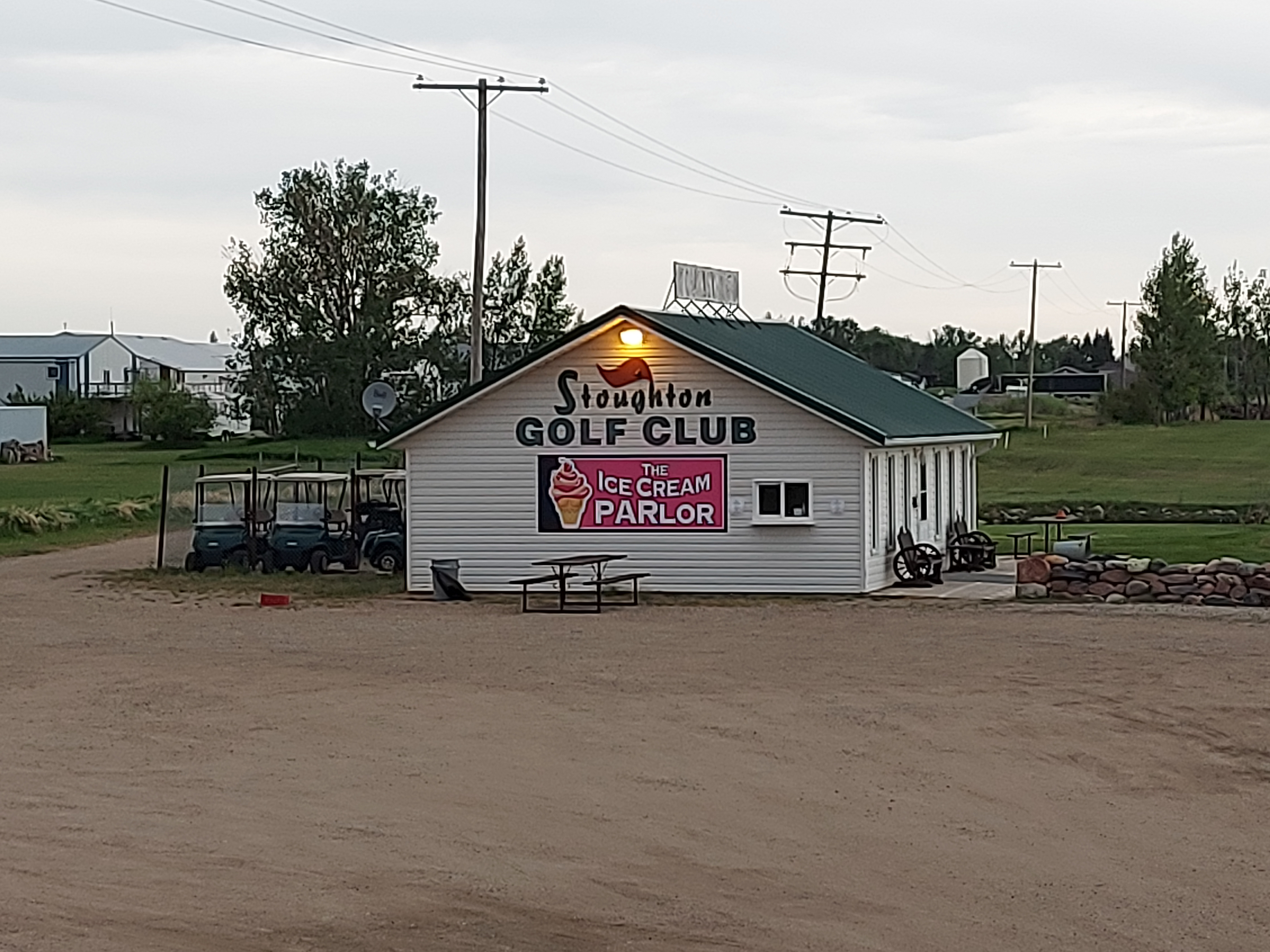
The tourist Info Centre and golf clubhouse

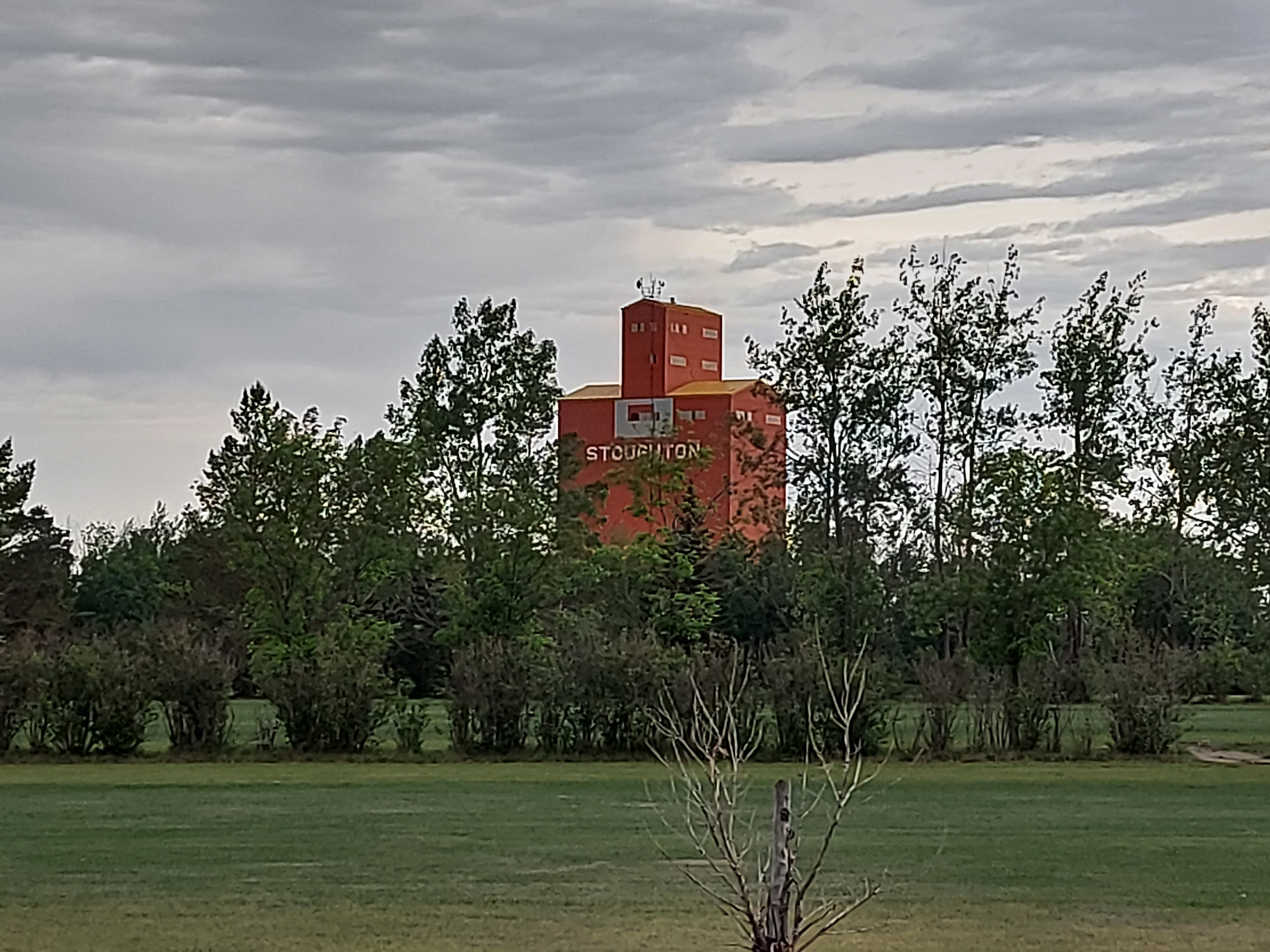
Stoughton golf course and grain elevator

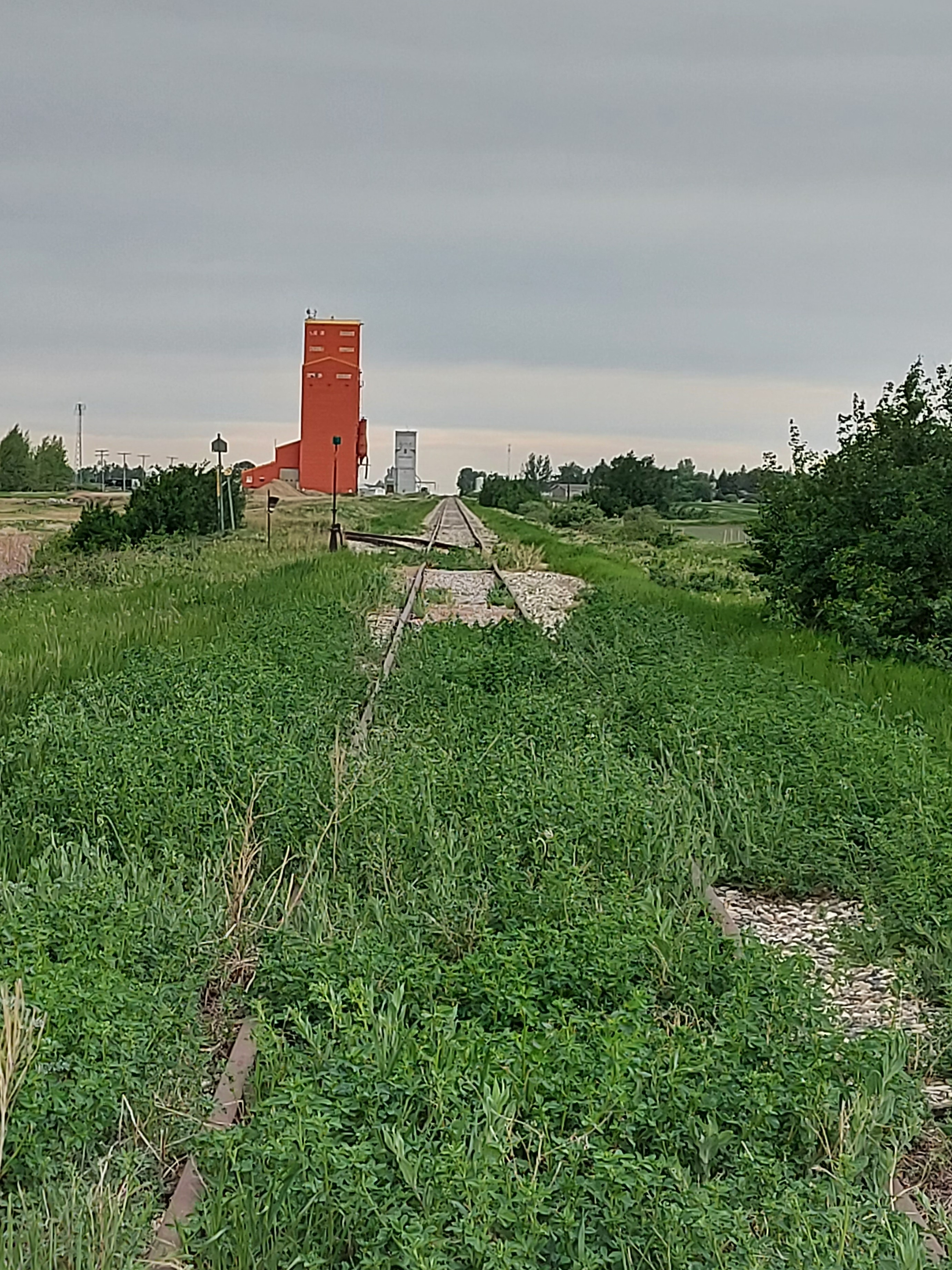
Both of Stoughton's grain elevators alongside the railway

== See also ==
- List of communities in Saskatchewan
- List of towns in Saskatchewan
