= Lewvan Drive & Pasqua Street =

Roadway in Regina, Saskatchewan, Canada

- Maintained by: City of Regina
- Length: 13.1 km (8.1 mi)
- Location: Regina
- South end: Ring Road S
- Major junctions: Saskatchewan Drive; Dewdney Avenue; Ring Road N
- North end: Highway 11A

Lewvan Drive and Pasqua Street is a major north–south roadway in west Regina, Saskatchewan. The roadway functions as the western portion of Ring Road; however, unlike Ring Road, it is an arterial road with no interchanges.

== Route description ==
=== Pasqua Street ===
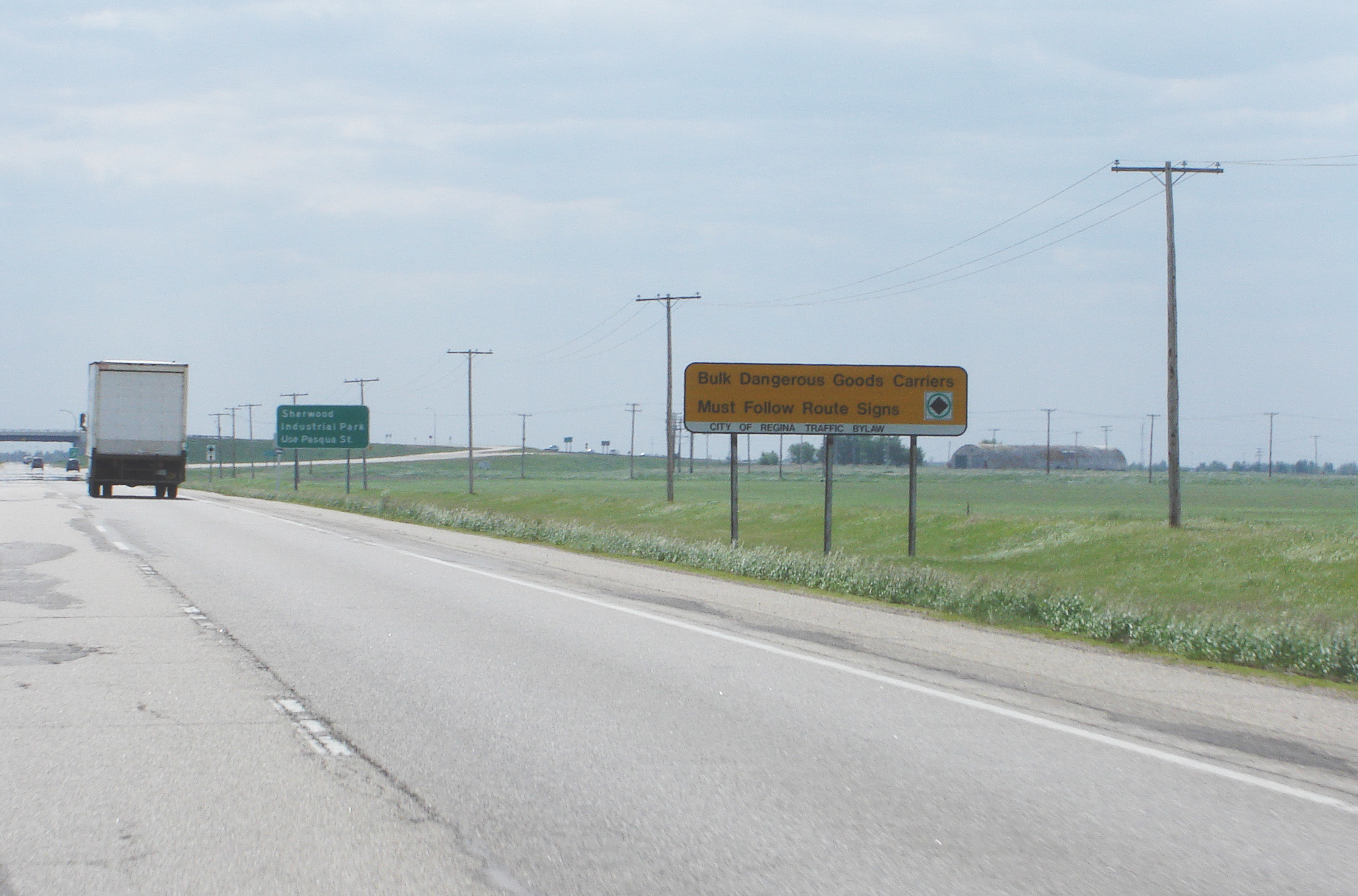
The Pasqua Street exit off Highway 11A

Pasqua Street is divided into two sections. The northern section is a four lane arterial road that runs north from Sherwood Drive, past Ring Road, to an interchange with Highway 11A. North of Highway 11A, it leaves Regina and passes through the Sherwood Industrial Park before downgrading to a country road. The southern section of Pasqua Street begins at 3 Avenue N (one block south of Sherwood Drive), and is residential street that continues south to Wintergreen Estates (located just north of the Trans-Canada Highway), where it becomes Koester Road. The southern section is discontinuous, divided by two railways and Evraz Place (formerly known as Regina Exhibition Park). Pasqua Street is named after Chief Joseph Pasqua, a Plains Cree chief of the Qu'Appelle Valley in the mid-19th century. Pasqua is a Cree word for prairie.

=== Lewvan Drive ===
Lewvan Drive is a four lane arterial road that begins at an interchange with the Trans-Canada Highway (Highway 1), travels north past the Regina International Airport, and ends at Sherwood Drive where the roadway continues as the northern section of Pasqua Street. Downtown Regina can be accessed via Saskatchewan Drive. Lewvan Drive is named after Lew Van Ostrand, an early settler south of Regina. When the Grand Trunk Pacific Railway arrived in 1911, the company purchased the townsite from Ostrand and combined the first two parts of his name to name the railroad in his honour.

== History ==
Pasqua Street originally ran continuous as a collector road through western Regina, but as the city grew it did not have the capacity to function as a major north–south artery. The Lewvan Expressway (later renamed Lewvan Drive) was constructed along a former CN rail line which ran parallel to Pasqua Street, allowing for limited access and grade-separated railway crossings, and was completed in 1984. As part of the project, at-grade railway crossings along Pasqua Street were closed resulting in it being segmented. The section of Pasqua between 9th Avenue South and Victoria Avenue was removed and replaced by an expansion of the city's exhibition grounds and development of Saskatchewan Drive, a major east–west thoroughfare which provided key access between downtown and Lewvan.

== Major intersections ==
From south to north: The entire route is in Regina.

km	mi	Destinations	Notes
0.0	0.0	Service Road	Southern terminus of Lewvan Drive
0.35	0.22	Ring Road S	Interchange; former Hwy 1
0.9	0.56	Harbour Landing Drive	
1.3	0.81	Gordon Road	
2.0	1.2	Jim Cairns Boulevard	
2.6	1.6	Parliament Avenue	
4.6	2.9	Regina Avenue – Regina International Airport	
5.1	3.2	Crosses Wascana Creek	
5.8	3.6	13th Avenue	
6.0	3.7	Saskatchewan Avenue	Access to Mosaic Stadium and Downtown Regina
6.4	4.0	11th Avenue	Access to Evraz Place
6.9	4.3	Dewdney Avenue	Access to RCMP Academy (Depot Division)
7.2	4.5	7th Avenue	
7.7	4.8	4th Avenue	
8.6	5.3	1st Avenue N	
9.1	5.7	Sherwood Drive	Lewvan Drive north end; Pasqua Street south end
9.7	6.0	Stapleford Crescent, Donahue Avenue	
10.1	6.3	9th Avenue N, Ring Road N	
10.7	6.6	Pasqua Gate	
11.5	7.1	Rochdale Boulevard	
12.1	7.5	Junor Drive	
13.1	8.1	Highway 11A (Louis Riel Trail) – Saskatoon, Albert Street	Interchange; former Hwy 11; continues north into R.M. of Sherwood No. 159
1.000 mi = 1.609 km; 1.000 km = 0.621 mi: Route transition

== See also ==
- Roads in Saskatchewan
