= Victoria Avenue (Regina, Saskatchewan) =

Street in Canada

- Maintained by: City of Regina
- Length: 10.9 km (6.8 mi)
- Location: Regina, Saskatchewan
- East end: Pasqua Street
- Major junctions: Albert Street; Broad Street; Winnipeg Street; Park Street; Ring Road; Prince of Wales Drive
- West end: Regina Bypass

Victoria Avenue is one of the main east-west streets in Regina, Saskatchewan, Canada. Victoria Avenue is named in honour of Queen Victoria and crosses Albert Street, (named in honour of the Queen's consort and husband, Prince Albert) in downtown. It is the main eastern entrance into Regina.

== Route description ==
Victoria Avenue begins as residential collector road in the Cathedral neighbourhood in Regina's old West End at Pasqua Street. Here Pasqua Street is a residential street, different from Pasqua Street N which is a northern extension of Lewvan Drive, a major north-south road in Regina; Victoria Avenue does not provide access to Lewvan Drive. Victoria Avenue continues east through the mature, residential neighbourhood to Albert Street in downtown Regina. It continues east as an arterial road to Broad Street, where it enters the Heritage neighbourhood and passes through another mature, residential neighbourhood. At Winnipeg Street, the streetscape transitions to commercial, leaving Heritage at Arcola Avenue. Victoria Avenue a diamond interchange at Ring Road, where it becomes a limited-access road, passing numerous power centres and big-box stores, as well as hotels, restaurants and a shopping mall, in an area known locally as "Vic East". At Tower Road, Victoria Avenue leaves Regina city limits and continues east to the Regina Bypass, where it merges onto the Trans-Canada Highway (Highway 1 east); Tower Road provides access to Highway 1 west.

== History ==
Victoria Avenue used to synonymous with the Trans-Canada Highway in Regina, as it continued east as the Trans-Canada Highway towards Winnipeg. The Trans-Canada Highway was signed from the east to Ring Road, where the city route continued west into downtown Regina, then south on Albert Street; the Trans-Canada Highway Bypass followed Ring Road south and continued west. By the 1990s, traffic congestion on Victoria Avenue E (east of Ring Road) had become a major safety concern, and necessitated the study of a new bypass. The Regina Bypass was opened in October, 2019 and as part of the project the Highway 1 designation was moved from Victoria Avenue to the new route. In addition, the Highway 11 designation, which previously began at Ring Road and Victoria Avenue and continued north to Saskatoon, was moved to the Regina Bypass on the western edge of the city.

== Major intersections ==
The entire route is in Regina.

| km | mi | Destinations | Notes |
|---|---|---|---|
| 0.0 | 0.0 | Pasqua Street | West end of Victoria Avenue, no direct access to Lewvan Drive |
| 0.7 | 0.43 | Elphinstone Street | |
| 1.6 | 0.99 | Albert Street to Highway 6 / Highway 1 west / Highway 11 north | |
| 2.4 | 1.5 | Broad Street | |
| 3.2 | 2.0 | Winnipeg Street | |
| 4.0 | 2.5 | Arcola Avenue | To Highway 33 |
| 4.9 | 3.0 | Park Street | |
| 5.5 | 3.4 | Ring Road (Highway 6) to Highway 1 west / Highway 11 north – Saskatoon, Moose Jaw | Diamond interchange (traffic signals) |
| 6.1 | 3.8 | Glencairn Road, Truesdale Drive | |
| 6.5 | 4.0 | Fleet Street, University Park Drive | |
| 7.1 | 4.4 | Coleman Crescent, Coleman Street | |
| 7.6 | 4.7 | Prince of Wales Drive | |
| 8.0 | 5.0 | Eastgate Drive, Quance Gate | |
| 9.2 | 5.7 | Aurora Boulevard | |
| 9.7 | 6.0 | Tower Road to Highway 1 west (Regina Bypass) – Moose Jaw | Access to Victoria Avenue from Highway 1 east; exit 234 on Highway 1 |
| 10.9 | 6.8 | Highway 1 (TCH) east – Winnipeg | Interchange; westbound exit and eastbound entrance; exit 232 on Highway 1 |
1.000 mi = 1.609 km; 1.000 km = 0.621 mi: Incomplete access

== See also ==
- Roads in Saskatchewan
- Monarchy in Saskatchewan
- Royal eponyms in Canada
