= Ring Road (Regina, Saskatchewan) =

Highway in Saskatchewan, Canada

Ring Road
- Trans-Canada Highway Bypass (partial, former)
- Ring Road highlighted in red

Route information
- Maintained by Ministry of Highways and Infrastructure
- Length: 22.3 km (13.9 mi)
- Component highways: Current: Hwy 6, CanAm Highway; Former: Hwy 1 (TCH), Hwy 11

Ring Road
- South end: Highway 1 (TCH) / Highway 11 (Regina Bypass)
- Major intersections: Lewvan Drive; CanAm Highway / Highway 6 (Albert Street S); Highway 33 (Arcola Avenue); Victoria Avenue; Highway 46 (McDonald Street); CanAm Highway / Highway 6 (Albert Street N)
- North end: Pasqua Street N / 9th Avenue N

9th Avenue N
- East end: Pasqua Street N / Ring Road
- West end: Highway 11 (Regina Bypass)

Location
- Country: Canada
- Province: Saskatchewan

Highway system
- Provincial highways in Saskatchewan

Ring Road is a four-lane controlled access highway in Regina, Saskatchewan, Canada. It is a partial ring road or beltway that forms a partial circle around Regina, bypasses the city on the north, east, and south sides, with Lewvan Drive and Pasqua Street N functioning as the de facto western leg. West of Pasqua Street, Ring Road continues west as 9th Avenue N, an arterial road. Ring Road has a speed limit of 100 km/h (62 mph) and consists of 13 interchanges. The highway also serves as the Regina portions of both Highway 6 and the CanAm Highway

== Route description ==
Ring Road forms a partial circle around Regina, connecting the city's eastern, southern, and northern suburbs and commercial districts with Regina's industrial centre. In addition to being used as a commuting highway, Ring Road sufficiently connects the CanAm Highway (Highway 6) and the Louis Riel Trail (Highway 11) to the Trans-Canada Highway (Highway 1) There is no western leg of Ring Road, nor is one planned; however, the north-south limited-access road of Lewvan Drive and Pasqua Street N functions as the de facto western leg. The western leg of the Regina Bypass, which opened in October 2019, provides a western freeway link between Highway 1 and Highway 11. With the west suburban developments flourishing in Regina, the Pasqua Street and Ring Road intersection becomes congested at peak hours. Thus the city plans to construct a new interchange at this point in the near future.

== Route details ==
Going from the south to north, the first interchange is combination interchange at the Regina Bypass, which is also where Ring Road intersects Highway 1 and Highway 11, and travels east. It continues past a partial cloverleaf interchange at Lewvan Drive to a cloverleaf interchange at Albert Street, where Highway 6 is directed to follow Ring Road. East of Albert Street, Ring Road turns northeast and passes a diamond interchange at Wascana Parkway, separating the campuses of the University of Regina and the Regina Campus of Saskatchewan Polytechnic. Ring Road crosses the Wascana Creek and a partial interchange with Assiniboine Avenue before reaching a diamond interchange with Arcola Avenue (Highway 33). Ring Road turns north and reaches a diamond interchange that bridges over 7-lane-wide Victoria Avenue. Prior to October 2019, section between the Regina Bypass and Victoria Avenue was part of Highway 1, and was named the Trans-Canada Highway Bypass. It currently has no numbered designation between Albert Street and the western end of the Regina Bypass, while the rest of the Ring Road is designated as part of Highway 6.

From Victoria Avenue, Ring Road continues north and reaches a half-diamond interchange that overpasses 3 lane wide Dewdney Avenue. Continuing north, Ring Road descends to underpass the Canadian Pacific rail line, curves to the north-west and also underpasses 5 lane Ross Avenue that connects to Ring Road with a half-diamond interchange. Immediately after this underpass, another rail line bridges over the highway. Ring Road then ascends to overpass McDonald Street (Highway 46) with a full diamond interchange.

After this point, there are 2 light-controlled railway crossings that are not bridged over Ring Road. The first is a CN line that has infrequent train crossings, and shortly afterwards approaches the CP line that has moderate train crossings. Even though typically the trains crossing these lines are short in length, evening rush hour in Regina often causes vehicle stand-stills at this point of Ring Road stretching over the McDonald Street interchange.

Immediately after these 2 rail crossings, Ring Road underpasses 5 lane wide Winnipeg Street which connects with a diamond interchange and curves to the west. Next, the highway underpasses Broad Street (with no interchange) followed by a pedestrian walkway. Ring Road then underpasses 6 lane wide Albert Street with a partial cloverleaf interchange that's missing the loop on the south-east corner as it's occupied by restaurants. Highway 6 exits Ring Road and continues north, providing access to Highway 11A (former Highway 11). Ring Road underpasses 5 lane Argyle Street connected with a half-diamond interchange before ending with a traffic light controlled intersection at Pasqua Street. Further west from this point, the road becomes 9th Avenue N.

9th Avenue N continues as an arterial road with traffic signals, intersecting McIntosh Street, McCarthy Boulevard, and Courtney Street before reaching the Regina Bypass.

Traffic volumes
Section		Pasqua St – Argyle St	Argyle St – Albert St N	Albert St N– Winnipeg St	Winnipeg St – McDonald St	McDonald St – Ross Ave	Ross Ave – Dewdney Ave	Dewdney Ave – Victoria Ave	Victoria Ave – Arcola Ave	Arcola Ave – Assiniboine Ave	Assiniboine Ave – Wascana Pkwy	Wascana Pkwy – Albert St N	Albert St N – Lewvan Dr
Traffic volume
Traffic volume	2007	32,300	36,300	38,900	37,700	27,700	33,500	32,300	22,600	22,500	34,000	18,600	12,300
Traffic volume	2017	40,100	51,000	64,000	60,000	52,000	68,000	52,000	56,000	52,000	67,000	50,000	36,000

== History ==
The southern portion of Ring Road was originally constructed in the late 1950s as part of the initial construction of the Trans-Canada Highway, which bypassed the city route of Albert Street and Victoria Avenue through downtown Regina, and was called the Trans-Canada Highway Bypass. Extensive work continued throughout the 1960s, one of the first two cloverleaf interchanges in Saskatchewan at Highway 1 and Highway 6 (Albert Street S), which opened in 1967 (the other cloverleaf was located at the southeast corner of Circle Drive in Saskatoon). Around the same time, Ring Road was constructed by bypassing 9th Avenue N east of Albert Street N and extending it towards Victoria Avenue, and was completed in 1979, which included a realignment of the Trans-Canada Highway Bypass at Victoria Avenue to link with Ring Road at Victoria Avenue and form a continuous roadway. Highway 1, 6, and 11 designations were moved from Albert Street and Victoria Avenue to Ring Road, bypassing Downtown Regina.

By the 1990s, traffic congestion on Victoria Avenue E (Highway 1) had become a major safety concern, and necessitated the study of a new bypass. In addition, the Global Transportation Hub (GTH), an 1,800-acre logistics park, was constructed in 2009 in required improved access to Highway 1 and Highway 11. The Regina Bypass was opened in October, 2019 and as part of the project, the Highway 1 and Highway 11 designations were moved from Ring Road to the new route. As part of the project, the Trans-Canada Highway Bypass section (Victoria Avenue E – Regina Bypass) was renamed to Ring Road.

== Exit list ==
Travelling counterclockwise (south to north). The entire route is in Regina. All exits are unnumbered.

km	mi	Destinations	Notes
0.0	0.0	Highway 1 (TCH) west – Moose Jaw Highway 1 (TCH) east / Highway 11 north (Regina Bypass) – Winnipeg, Saskatoon	Combination interchange; continues as Hwy 1 west; exit 258 on Hwy 1; exit 0 on Hwy 11
4.6	2.9	Lewvan Drive – Regina International Airport	Partial-cloverleaf interchange
6.5	4.0	CanAm Highway south / Highway 6 south (Albert Street S) – City Centre, Weyburn	Cloverleaf interchange; south end of Hwy 6 concurrency
9.1	5.7	Wascana Parkway – University of Regina, Saskatchewan Polytechnic	Diamond interchange
11.1	6.9	Crosses Wascana Creek	
11.4	7.1	Assiniboine Avenue	Partial Y-interchange; northbound exit, southbound entrance
12.8	8.0	Arcola Avenue (Highway 33 east) – Francis	Diamond interchange
14.0	8.7	Victoria Avenue E to Highway 1 east – City Centre, Winnipeg	Diamond interchange
14.9	9.3	Dewdney Avenue	Half diamond interchange; southbound exit, northbound entrance
16.1	10.0	Ross Avenue	Half diamond interchange; northbound exit, southbound entrance
17.4	10.8	McDonald Street (Highway 46 east) – Pilot Butte, Balgonie	Diamond interchange
18.4	11.4	Railway crossing	At-grade crossing
18.6	11.6	Railway crossing	At-grade crossing
18.8	11.7	Winnipeg Street	Diamond interchange
20.7	12.9	CanAm Highway north / Highway 6 north (Albert Street N) to Highway 11A north / Highway 11 north – City Centre, Melfort, Saskatoon	Cloverleaf interchange; north end of Hwy 6 concurrency
21.7	13.5	Argyle Street	Half diamond interchange; westbound exit, eastbound entrance
22.3 0.0	13.9 0.0	Pasqua Street N – Regina International Airport	At-grade (traffic signals); interchange proposed Ring Road north end • 9th Avenue N east end
0.8	0.50	McIntosh Street	At-grade (traffic signals)
1.6	0.99	McCarthy Boulevard	At-grade (traffic signals)
2.4	1.5	Railway crossing	At-grade crossing
3.3	2.1	Courtney Street	At-grade (traffic signals)
5.7	3.5	Highway 11 (Regina Bypass) to Highway 1 – Saskatoon	Partial cloverleaf interchange (at-grade ramps); exit 11 on Hwy 11
1.000 mi = 1.609 km; 1.000 km = 0.621 mi: Concurrency terminus; Incomplete access; Route transition
