= Regina Bypass =

Highway in Saskatchewan, Canada

Regina Bypass
- Regina Bypass highlighted in red
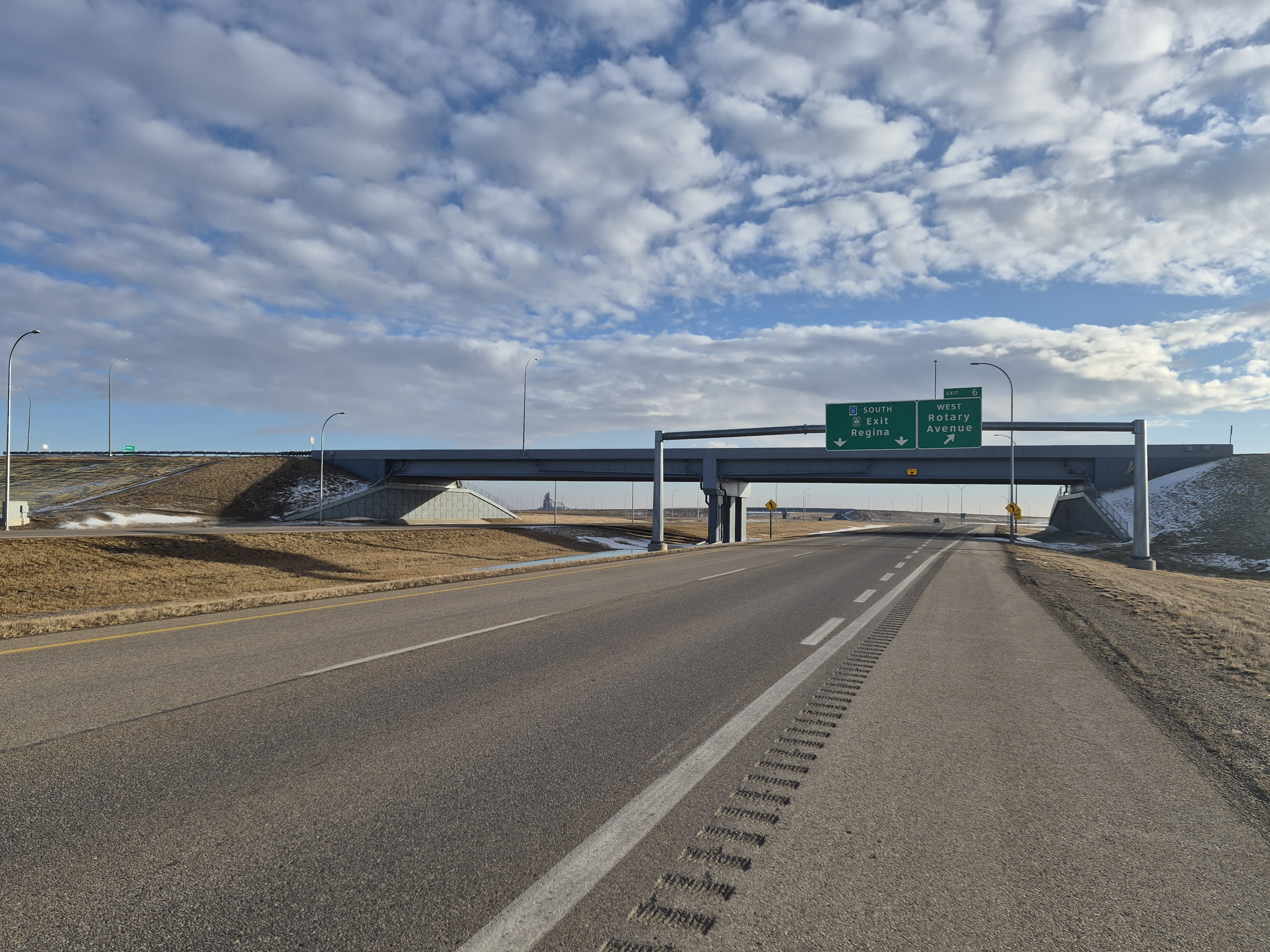
- Regina Bypass

Route information
- Length: 44.3 km (27.5 mi)
- Existed: 2015–present
- Component highways: Highway 1 (TCH), Highway 11

Major junctions
- East end: Highway 1 (TCH) east / Victoria Ave
- Highway 33; Highway 6 Highway 1 (TCH) west
- North end: Highway 11 north / Highway 11A

Location
- Country: Canada
- Province: Saskatchewan
- Rural municipalities: Sherwood No. 159
- Major cities: Regina

Highway system
- Provincial highways in Saskatchewan
← Highway 999	→ Highway 2
← Highway 10	→ Highway 12

The Regina Bypass is a four-lane twinned highway connector road in Regina, Saskatchewan. The 44.3-kilometre (27.5 mi) route connects Highway 1 (the Trans-Canada Highway) with Highway 11, forming a partial ring road around the city of Regina.

Phase one, east of Regina from Balgonie to Highway 33, finished on-schedule on October 30, 2017. The second phase of the bypass opened to traffic on October 29, 2019. The project, slated to cost $1.8 billion overall, was the largest single infrastructure project in the history of Saskatchewan. The bypass is owned on behalf of the public by the Ministry of Highways and Infrastructure with design, construction, operations, and long-term maintenance performed by the Regina Bypass Partners.

== Scope ==
The full project scope encompasses 464 single-lane kilometres of work, roughly the distance between Regina and Medicine Hat. It consists of:

- 12 overpasses,
- 40 km of new four-lane highway,
- 20 km of resurfaced four-lane highway,
- 55 km of new service roads, and
- Twinning of about 5 km of Highway 6.

The project was being built in three distinct sections: "Area 1", which will upgrade and extend the city's existing Pinkie Road into a full connection between Highway 1 and Highway 11 in the west of the city; "Area 2", which constructed a new route south of the city between Highway 1 and Highway 33; and "Area 3", which completed the connection from Highway 33 back to Highway 1 in the east of the city adjacent to Tower Road, as well as further upgrades to the existing route of Highway 1 easterly to Highway 46.

The route runs west of the Regina International Airport.

== History ==
The Regina Bypass serves as a replacement bypass route for the existing Regina Ring Road. The Ring Road was originally constructed as an urban bypass route around Regina's city centre, however urban growth since Ring Road's construction effectively turned it into an arterial road with high traffic congestion along some portions of the route.

Plans for the Pinkie Road segment of the route were announced in 2009, with the remainder of the bypass loop finalized in 2014.

In 2015, original Pacer Baseball Park closed down to make way for the bypass, the new facility opened in 2018.

Pinkie Road will be a primary access highway with access points for the Global Transportation Hub (GTH). The project is undertaken by the City of Regina, Sherwood No. 159 rural municipality (RM) Ministry of Highways and Infrastructure (MHI) and Transport Canada to provide an Intermodal freight transport center and the road infrastructure between two National Highway System routes. C$27 million will be contributed by the Government of Canada as part of the Asia-Pacific Gateway and Corridor Initiative (APGCI) towards this $93 million project. The provincial government will commit about $27 million to the project. Former Highways and Infrastructure Minister Wayne Elhard discussed expanding the Government's role in the next phase of the development project. The average vehicles per day on both Hwy 1 and Hwy 11 were examined in 5-year and 25-year projections. The traffic on Hwy 1 is expected to have an average of 10,140 to 11,210 vehicles per day on the west and east side of the proposed interchange in five years. This amount in 25 years is expected to increase to 21,040 vehicles per day on the west and 31,340 vehicles per day on the east side of the proposed interchange respectively. Hwy 11 is projected to increase from 13,060 to 23,870 vehicles per day in 25 years.

The new connector road across Dewdney Avenue will carry 5,500 vehicles per day projected in 5 years increasing to 33,000 vehicles per day in 25 years. Currently the Average Annual Daily Traffic (AADT) on Hwy 1 is 9,280 vehicles per day west of Pinkie Road, and 11,680 on the east side of Pinkie Road. On Hwy 11 east of the interchange the AADT is 8,840. On Pinkie Road south of the interchange the traffic volume is 7,740 vehicles per day. John Law, Deputy Minister of Highways and Infrastructure estimated that it will cost about $45 million to upgrade service roads to Pinkie Road and the intermodal facility to support approximately 1,400 commercial trucks per week in the area. The proposal was looking at a 4 lane twinned highway with service roads. It will become part of the long term bypass route around Regina, and will accommodate future growth of the city to a population of 300,000. Pinkie Road will be approximately 26 kilometres (16 mi) in length. The annexation of land by the city from the RM of Sherwood is being negotiated and the city will pay about $1,500,000 and supply water to the RM for the land segment.

The city initially considered four industrial land options for development Argyle Park — IPSCO lands, Regina Airport, Ross Industrial Park and the Pinkie Road and Trans-Canada Highway areas. In November 2007, Regina City Council examined a report which studied projected industrial growth for the city of Regina until 2027. The study proposed a new industrial area west of the Regina airport. The major roads would be constructed by the Ministry of Highways and Infrastructure and they would be supported by a $7 million payment by the City of Regina. The city also examined at this concept plan the cost of $54 million for infrastructure servicing of facilities. Regina's general manager of corporate services is looking at servicing fees and development levies to help repay the loan. A 20-year time frame will extend land use to also include a light industrial park. A number of open houses were held with the public to determine planning, road alignments, access points and general location of the new connector road. Following the advisement of two consultation firms, the city of Regina has determined to proceed with the land development and water, drainage, and wastewater management procedures outlined for the Regina Inland Port. There was two phases of land development the land development west of Pinkie Road will constitute phase 1 and east of Pinkie Road will be Phase 2.

The first overpass of the Trans-Canada Highway section of the bypass was partially finished and into operation on July 27, 2017, in the town of Balgonie. The second overpass of this section of the bypass was partially finished and put into operation on August 10, 2017, in the town of White City. CBC stated that the Balgonie overpass would be fully functional by Labour Day and the White City overpass would be fully functional by the third week of September, since the ramps need finishing touches. In 2016, construction began on a diverging diamond interchange (DDI) at the Pilot Butte Access Road (Hwy 362); completed on March 9, 2018, it is the first DDI in Saskatchewan and the second in Canada.

Phase 1 of the bypass (Balgonie to Highway 33) opened October 30, 2017 with phase 2 of the bypass (Highway 33 to Highway 11) opening on October 29, 2019, completing the project.

A northeast leg of the Bypass, from Highway 11 to the Trans-Canada Highway (Victoria Avenue) remains to be constructed. As of fall 2021, no time frame for this work has been suggested. In the meantime, the northeast leg of Ring Road within the city continues to serve its purpose as a central-city bypass.

== Cost ==
In 2015, the Government of Saskatchewan committed $1.88 billion for design, construction, and 30 years of operations and maintenance. Of this, the construction budget is approximately $1.2 billion.

The first concept of a bypass, in 2013, was considerably smaller in scope and focused only on a route to divert traffic south of the city. The Ministry of Highways had two other, related projects under consideration at that time: overpasses east of Regina to improve safety for White Butte communities, and a project west of the city to divert traffic of Dewdney Avenue. Each of these small projects were estimated at $400 million. A decision was made to combine these individual components into one project, the Regina Bypass, with a cost estimate (construction only) of $1.2 billion.

The project is being undertaken as a public-private partnership (P3). Financial analysis from Ernst & Young determined the P3 option was $380 million cheaper than a typical government-led build.

Value for Money Comparison (2015 dollars)
	Conventional	Public-Private Partnership (P3)
Payments to private sector	$1,646.2 M	$1,787.0 M
Ancillary costs	$89.0 M	$45.1 M
Risks borne by government	$476.9 M	$49.4 M
Competitive neutrality adjustment (tax implications)	$49.3 M	n/a
Total NPV	$2,261.4 M	$1,881.5 M
P3 Savings	$379.9 M (16.8%)	

Other benefits attributed to the P3 include a faster construction schedule, better technology, and protection against cost overruns.

== Economic benefits ==
The Regina Bypass is Saskatchewan's single largest single job creator since the railroad crossed western Canada in the 1880s. Construction alone was expected to create 8,200 jobs, in addition to spin-off effects generated by capital spending. In the long-term, the bypass will enhance the productivity of local businesses by providing cheaper, faster access to major trade routes including Highway 1 east–west and the Highway 6 connections to Edmonton and the United States.

As of March 2017, construction had involved 95 Saskatchewan companies including Graham, the Broda Group, Brandt, Clifton Associates, Crestview Chrysler, Fraser Strategy, Inland Aggregates, Lonesome Prairie, Urban Systems, and Noremac.

== Environmental and heritage impact ==
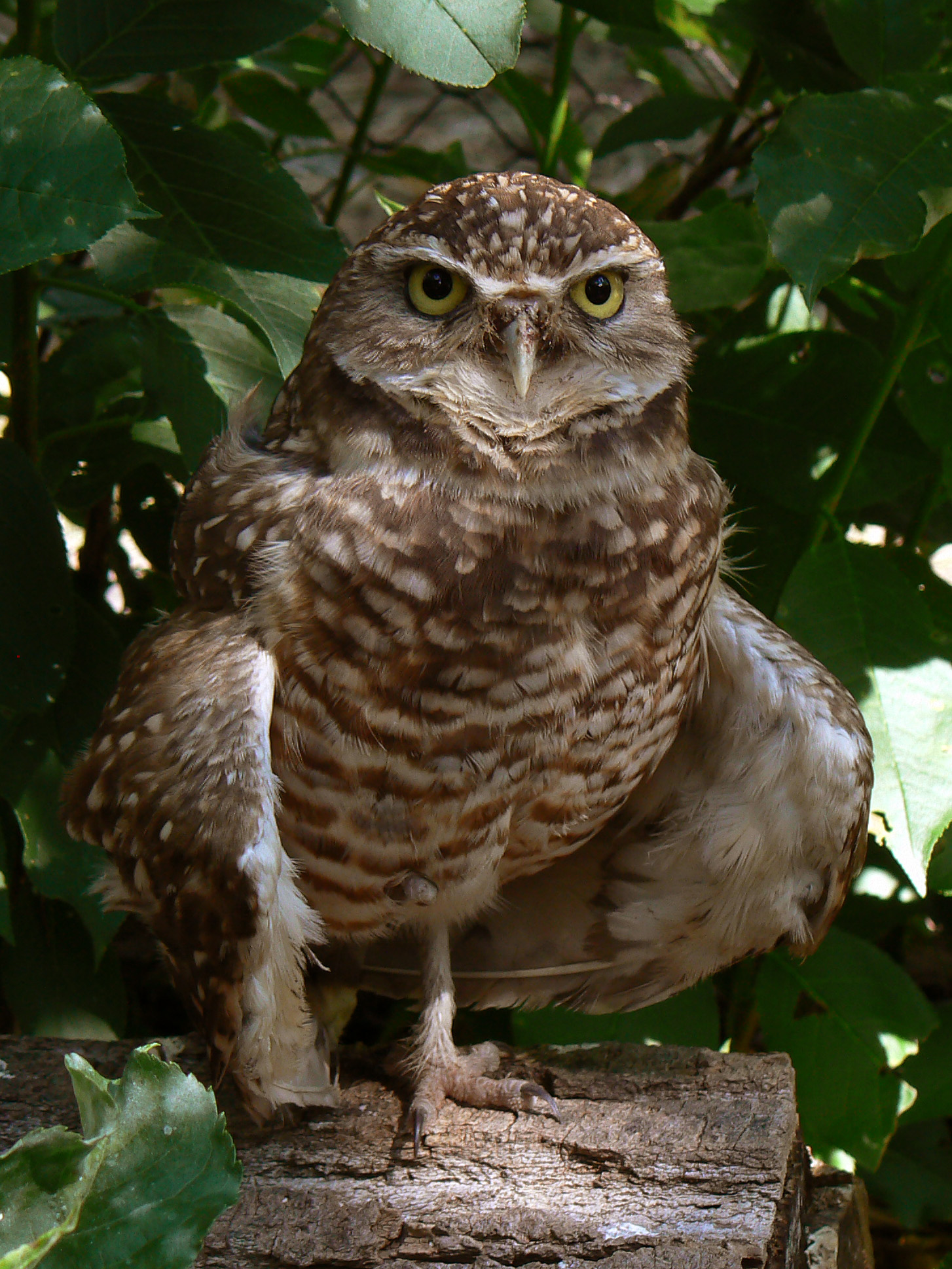
Burrowing owl

The proposal was studying the impact the new roadway will have on protected species of fauna in Saskatchewan such as the burrowing owl (Athene cunicularia), loggerhead shrike (Lanius ludovicianus), Sprague's pipit {Anthus spragueii}, peregrine falcon (Falco peregrinus), yellow rail (Coturnicops noveboracensis), monarch butterfly (Danaus plexippus) and northern leopard frog (Rana pipiens). Flora of Saskatchewan which may be impacted would be the prairie ragwort (Senecio plattensis) and Geyer's onion (Allium geyeri). The Presbyterian Indian Residential School Cemetery is also located in this vicinity north of Dewdney Avenue and east of Pinkie Road. The project is being planned to meet any requirements set forth under the Building Canada Plan as well as evaluation of project procedures for environmental concerns as set out by the Canadian Environmental Assessment Act.

== Exit list ==
Excludes the 15.6 km (9.7 mi) section of existing Saskatchewan Highway 1 that was upgraded as part of the project.

Location	km	mi	Exit	Destinations	Notes
Sherwood No. 159	0.0	0.0		Highway 1 (TCH) east – Winnipeg	Continues east
Sherwood No. 159	0.0	0.0	232	Victoria Avenue – City Centre	Westbound exit and eastbound entrance; exit numbers follow Hwy 1
Sherwood No. 159	2.0	1.2	234	Victoria Avenue – City Centre	Eastbound exit and westbound entrance; follows Tower Road
Sherwood No. 159	5.2	3.2	237	Highway 33 (Arcola Avenue) – Francis	
Sherwood No. 159	10.0	6.2	242	Fleet Street	Westbound right-in/right-out
Sherwood No. 159	10.0	6.2	242	Range Road 2193	Eastbound right-in/right-out
Sherwood No. 159	15.8	9.8	247	Highway 6 (Albert Street) / CanAm Highway – Weyburn, U.S. Border	
Sherwood No. 159	20.8	12.9	253	Courtney Street	At-grade
Sherwood No. 159	24.5– 26.8	15.2– 16.7	258; 0	Highway 1 (TCH) west / Ring Road east – Moose Jaw, City Centre; Highway 11 begins	Southbound signed as exits 0A (east), exit 0B (west), and exit 0C (C/D); northbound signed as exit 258 (to Hwy 11 north) and exit 0 (east)
Sherwood No. 159	24.5– 26.8	15.2– 16.7	West end Highway 1 (TCH) designation • South end Highway 11 designation		
Sherwood No. 159	29.6	18.4	4	Pinkie Road	Exit numbers follow Hwy 11
Regina	32.1	19.9	6	Rotary Avenue	
Regina	32.8	20.4	7	Dewdney Avenue	Southbound exit and northbound entrance
Regina	36.1	22.4	11	9th Avenue N	
Sherwood No. 159	39.3	24.4	14	Armour Road	At-grade
Sherwood No. 159	44.3	27.5	19	Highway 11 north / Highway 11A south – Saskatoon, City Centre	
1.000 mi = 1.609 km; 1.000 km = 0.621 mi: Incomplete access; Route transition

== See also ==
- List of Saskatchewan provincial highways
