= Cornwall Centre =

Cornwall Centre may refer to:

- the Cornwall Centre, a shopping mall in Regina, Saskatchewan, Canada
- the Kresen Kernow (Cornish for Cornwall Centre), an archive in Redruth, Cornwall
