= Albert Memorial Bridge (Regina, Saskatchewan) =

- Albert Memorial Bridge in 2026
- Coordinates: 50.4362°N 104.6181°W
- Carries: 4 lanes of Albert Street
- Crosses: Wascana Creek
- Locale: Regina, Saskatchewan, Canada
- Official name: Albert Memorial Bridge
- Maintained by: City of Regina

Characteristics
- Design: Beam (reinforced concrete, flat slab)
- Total length: 256 metres
- Width: 22 metres
- Piers in water: 3

History
- Designer: Engineer: Claude A.P. Turner; Architects: Puntin, O'Leary, and Coxall
- Opened: 1930-11-10

Location
- Interactive map of Albert Memorial Bridge

The Albert Memorial Bridge is a beam bridge that spans across the north and south banks of Wascana Creek along Albert Street in Regina, Saskatchewan. This functional war memorial is 256 metres (840 feet) long and 22 metres (72 feet) wide.

== History ==
The Albert Memorial Bridge's construction was part of a larger relief project during the Great Depression, which also included draining and dredging the adjacent Wascana Lake, and building two islands in the lake. The bridge was designed by the architectural firm of Puntin, O'Leary and Coxall, as well as noted consulting engineer Claude A.P. Turner. The bridge is highly ornamented with Egyptian motifs, lamp standards, multiple flag-staffs, glazed terra-cotta balusters and buffalo heads.

Although the bridge's cost was estimated at less than $100,000 before construction, the final cost was $250,000. It was ridiculed by the locals because of its cost and became known as "Bryant's Folly", after then-public works minister James Bryant. It was opened on November 10, 1930, by Premier J. T. M. Anderson and dedicated as a memorial to the Saskatchewan soldiers who died in World War I. Although spaces were provided for the installation of plaques with the names of province's war dead, they were never used. Sixty-five years later, a separate World War I memorial on the grounds of the legislative building was constructed.

The bridge was re-dedicated on October 2, 1988, after a $1.4 million restoration project. In June 2009, another major refurbishment project was begun on the bridge. The deck was resurfaced, and decorative elements like the terra-cotta balustrades were restored. The cost of the work was estimated at $5 million. By late October, most of the work (except the top layer of asphalt) had been completed.

== Gallery ==
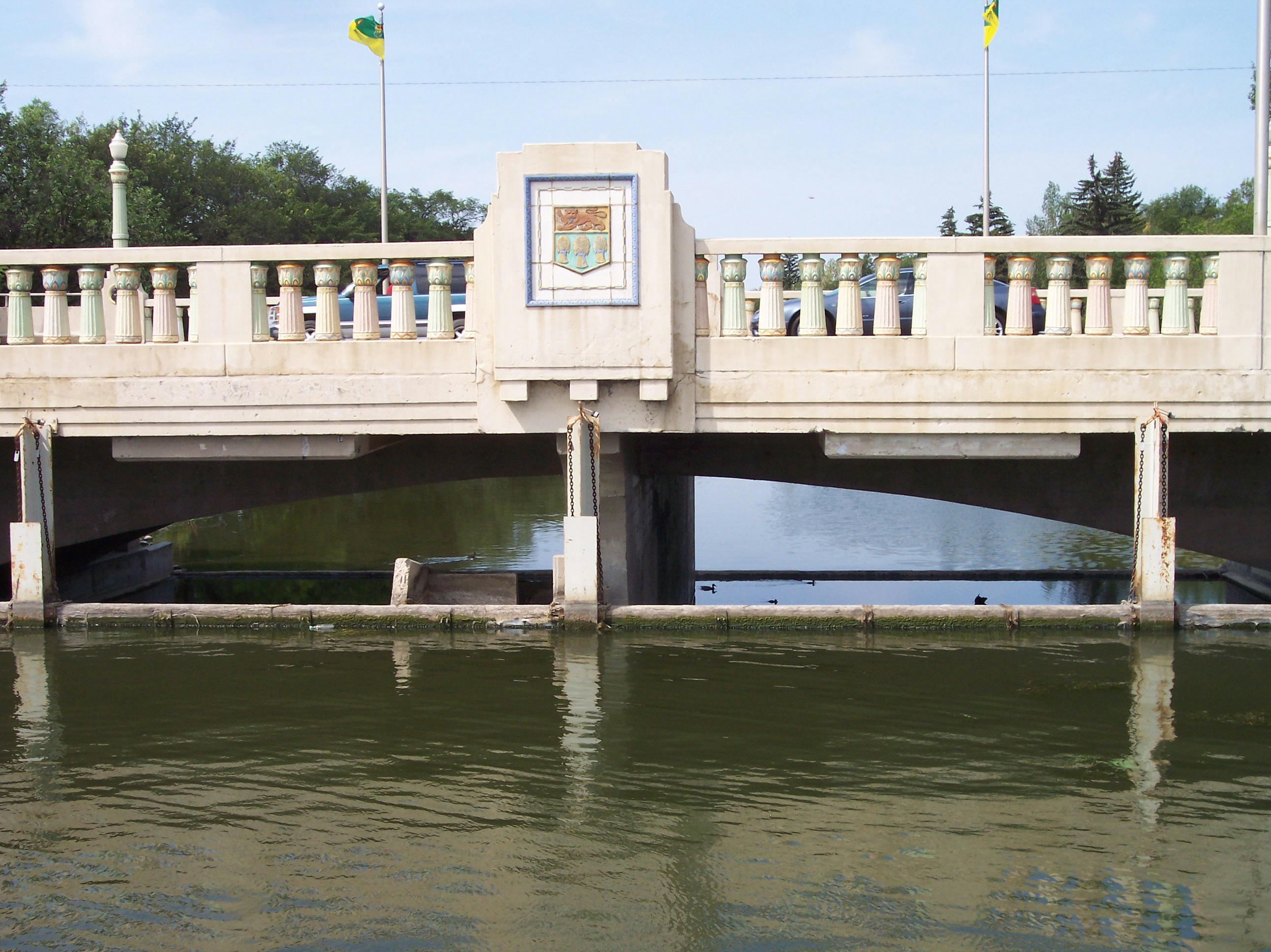
The dam of Albert Memorial Bridge with a terracotta representation of the Saskatchewan coat of arms above

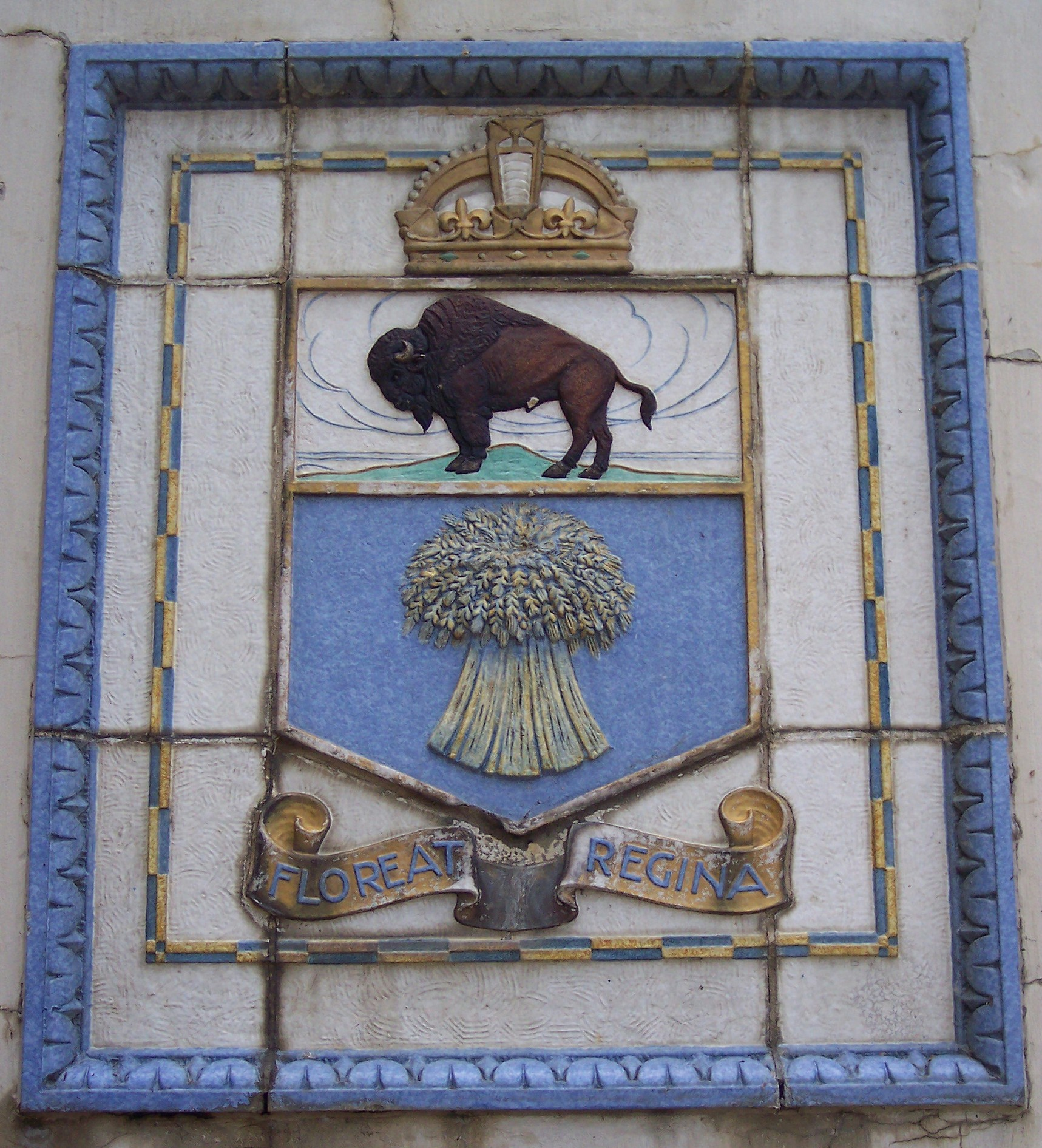
Regina coat of arms on the bridge

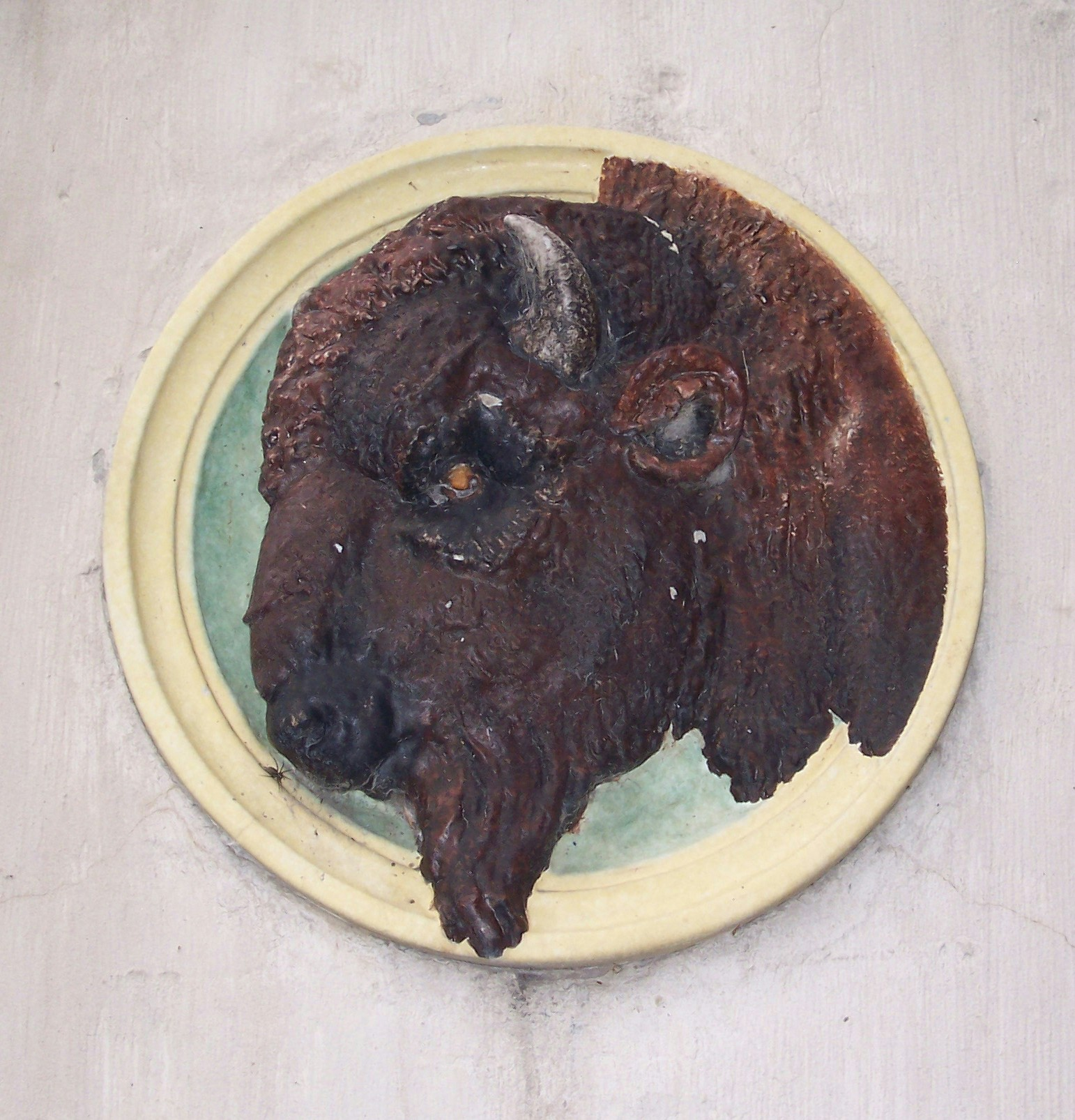
Glazed terracotta buffalo detail on the bridge

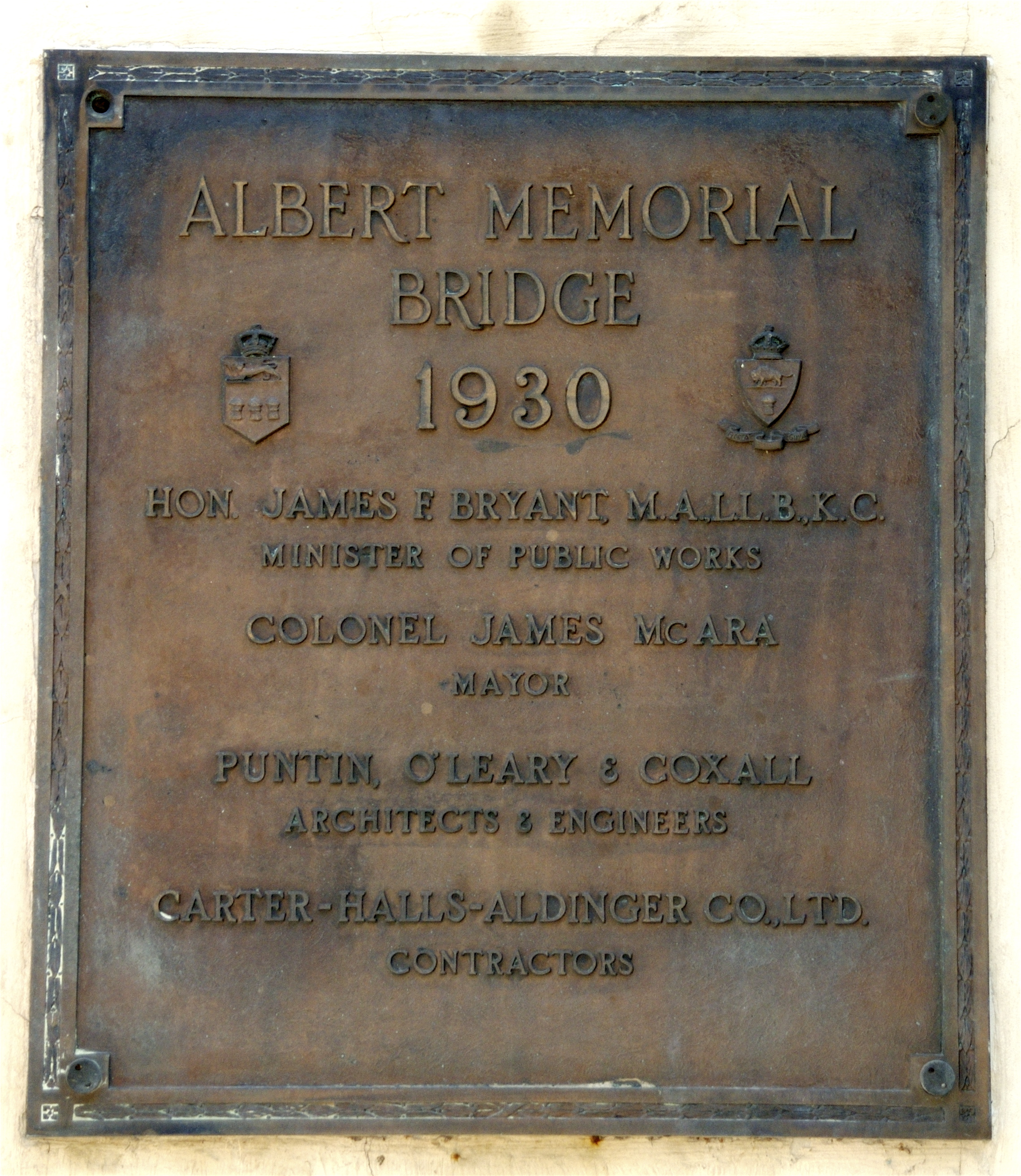
Plaque
