= Albert Street (Regina, Saskatchewan) =

- Part of: Highway 6
- Maintained by: City of Regina
- Length: 11.5 km (7.1 mi)
- Location: Regina
- South end: Ring Road S
- Major junctions: Victoria Avenue; Saskatchewan Drive; Dewdney Avenue; Ring Road N
- North end: Highway 11A

Albert Street is an arterial road in Regina, Saskatchewan. It is one of the main roads in and out of the downtown area of the city. It is named in honour of Prince Albert, the husband and consort of Queen Victoria, and intersects Victoria Avenue (named after Queen Victoria) in centre of the city.

Albert Street is considered synonymous with Highway 6, although signage now points Highway 6 to follow Ring Road and bypass the downtown area; however, some maps and remnant signage and still show Highway 6 as following Albert Street through Regina. An alternate route of the Trans-Canada Highway (Highway 1) through Regina, follows Albert Street between Highway 1 and Victoria Avenue.

== Route description ==
Albert Street begins at the Ring Road (formerly the Trans-Canada Highway Bypass), where it continues as Highway 6 South, and travels north through southern Regina's main commercial area. North of 25th Avenue, it passes through Albert Street South, an upscale, historical residential neighbourhood of large mansions dating from the 1910s and 1920s. Albert Street also forms the eastern boundary of Wascana Centre, providing access to the MacKenzie Art Gallery and Saskatchewan Legislative Building. After crossing the Albert Memorial Bridge across Wascana Creek, it continues north through The Crescents, also an upscale, historic residential neighbourhood, and passes by the Royal Saskatchewan Museum before passing through Regina's downtown core and intersects Victoria Avenue. North of downtown, Albert Street passes through North Central and more commercial development before reaching Ring Road. Albert Street is a short freeway between Ring Road and Highway 11A (formerly Highway 11), before it leaves Regina, passes through the Sherwood Industrial Park, and continues north and Highway 6 north.

== Major intersections ==
From south to north:

Location	km	mi	Destinations	Notes
Sherwood No. 159	−4.6	−2.9	Highway 6 / CanAm Highway south – Weyburn, U.S. border	Continues south
Sherwood No. 159	−4.6	−2.9	Highway 1 (TCH) (Regina Bypass) – Moose Jaw, Winnipeg	Partial cloverleaf interchange; Highway 1 exit 247
Regina	0.0	0.0	Ring Road S (Highway 6 north) to Highway 1 – Moose Jaw, Winnipeg	Cloverleaf interchange; Highway 6 leaves Albert Street
Regina	0.9	0.56	Gordon Road	
Regina	2.1	1.3	Parliament Avenue	
Regina	3.0	1.9	23rd Avenue	To MacKenzie Art Gallery
Regina	3.5	2.2	Hill Avenue, Hill Boulevard	To Wascana Centre
Regina	4.1	2.5	20th Avenue, Legislative Drive	To Saskatchewan Legislative Building
Regina	4.2	2.6	Regina Avenue	To Regina International Airport
Regina	4.4	2.7	Albert Memorial Bridge crosses Wascana Creek	
Regina	4.9	3.0	College Avenue	To Royal Saskatchewan Museum
Regina	5.4	3.4	13th Avenue	
Regina	5.6	3.5	Victoria Avenue to Highway 1 east – Winnipeg	
Regina	6.0	3.7	Saskatchewan Drive	To Brandt Centre, Mosaic Stadium, and Casino Regina
Regina	6.5	4.0	Dewdney Avenue	To RCMP Academy (Depot Division)
Regina	7.4	4.6	4th Avenue	
Regina	9.7	6.0	9th Avenue N	Northbound access to Ring Road
Regina	10.0	6.2	Ring Road N (Highway 6 south) to Highway 1	Cloverleaf interchange; Highway 6 rejoins Albert Street; former Highway 11 south
Regina	11.5	7.1	Highway 11A north to Highway 11 (Louis Riel Trail) – Lumsden, Saskatoon	Y-interchange; northbound exit and southbound entrance
Regina	11.5	7.1	Highway 6 / CanAm Highway north – Southey, Melfort	Continues north
1.000 mi = 1.609 km; 1.000 km = 0.621 mi: Concurrency terminus; Incomplete access

== See also ==
- Roads in Saskatchewan
