= Neighbourhoods in Regina, Saskatchewan =

Neighbourhood descriptions

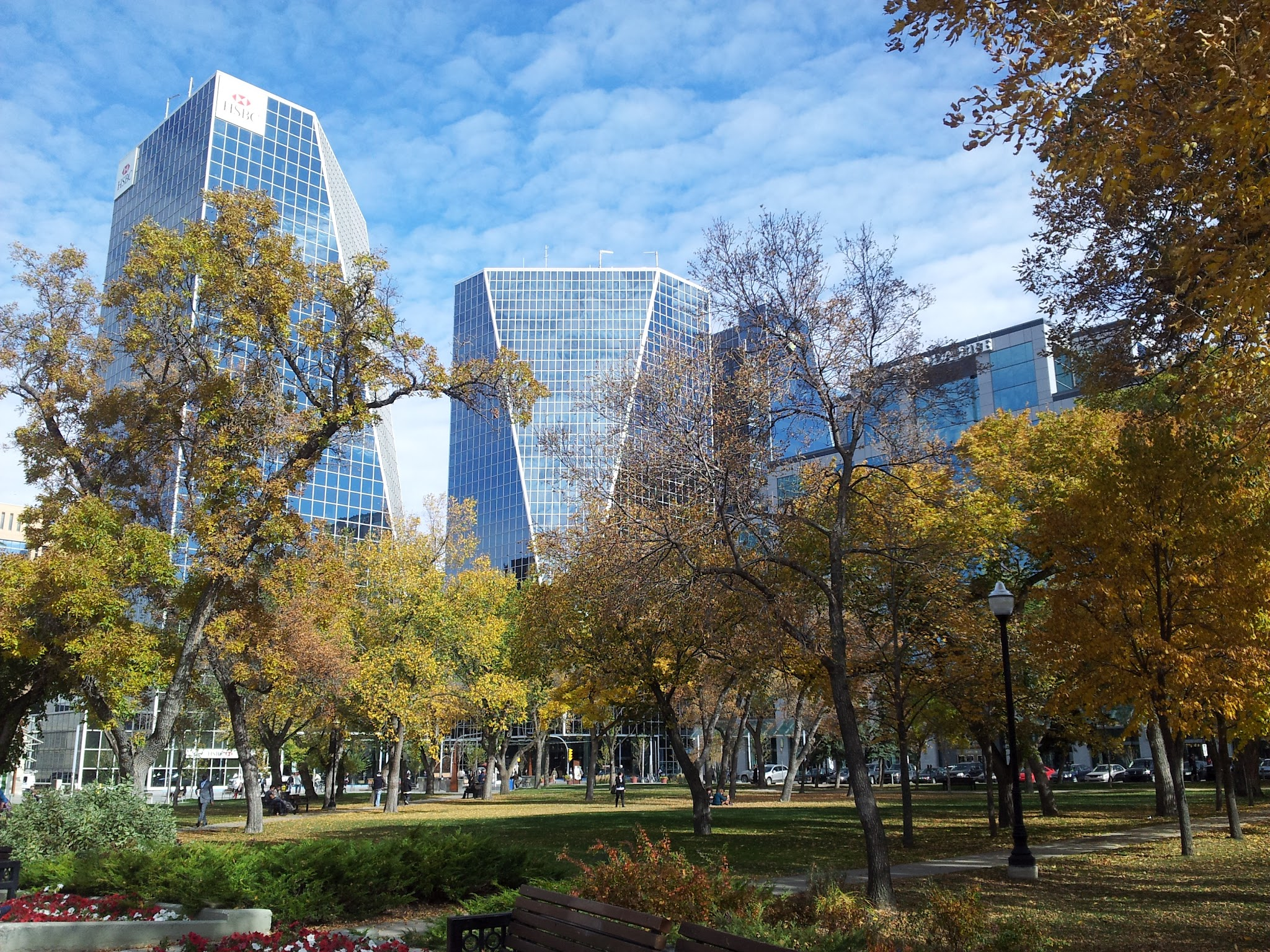
Buildings in Downtown Regina as seen from Victoria Park

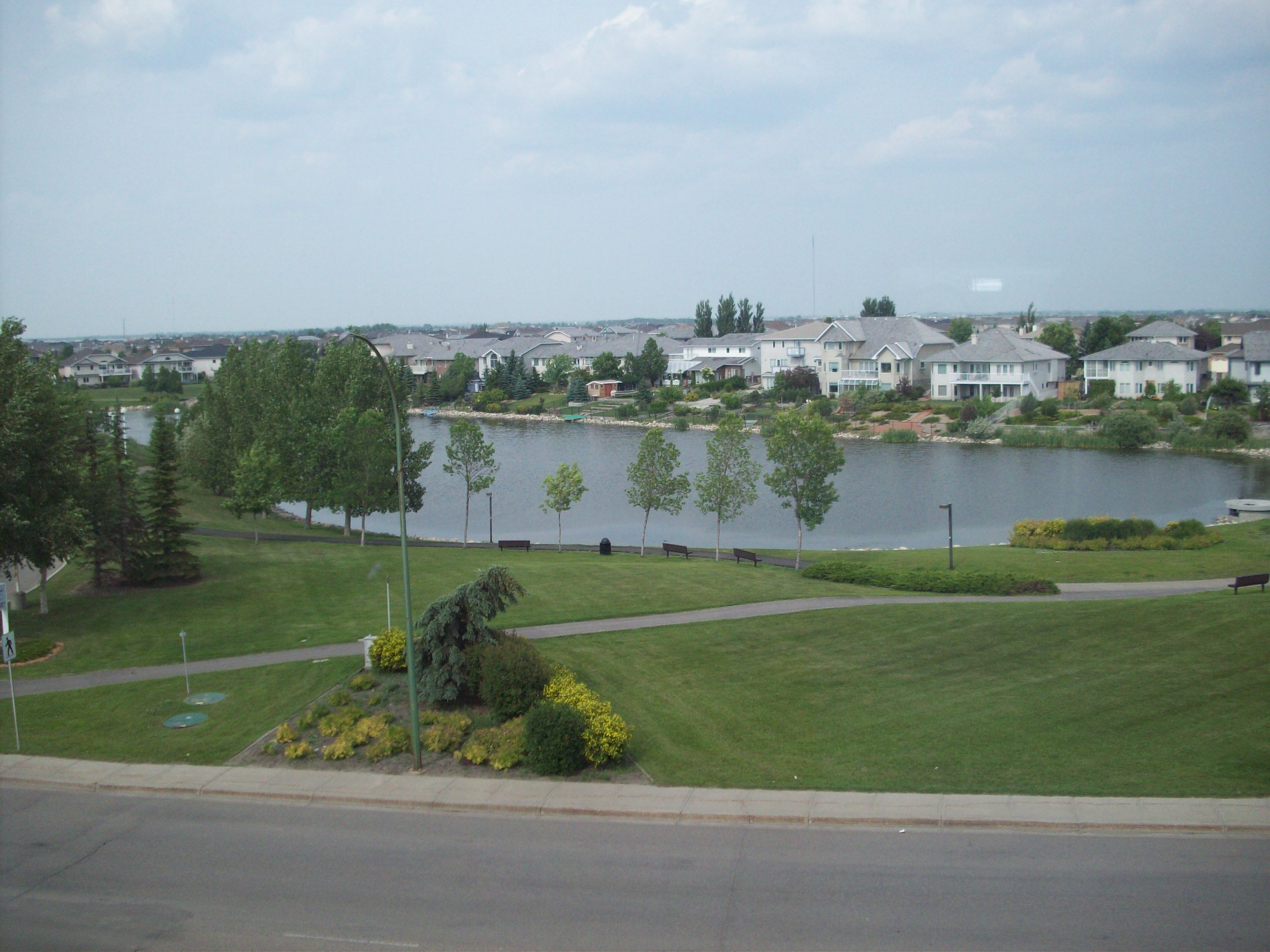
Decorative storm reservoir in Windsor Park, a newer residential subdivision: such features are characteristic of affluent new developments in the east and north sectors of the city.

Seven neighbourhoods are of considerable note:

Regina's residential areas, apart from the remaining residential portion of the original town between the CPR tracks and Wascana Lake to the immediate south of the central business district, are largely typical of western Canadian cities, mostly consisting of unremarkable post-World War II single-family dwellings on substantial lots.

(1) The downtown business district;

(2) the West End (latterly deemed the "Cathedral Area");

(3) the historic and affluent Crescents area, immediately to the north of Wascana Creek west of the Albert Street bridge and dam which creates Wascana Lake);

(4) Germantown, originally an impoverished and ill-serviced ghetto of continental Europeans;

(5) South Albert Street, adjacent to the provincial Legislative Building and office buildings, a neighbourhood of imposing mansions dating from the before the First World War through the post-War '20s boom;

(6) the Warehouse District, formerly — obviously, as its name suggests — the reception zone for freight arriving from eastern Canada and the USA for sale by Regina wholesalers, and latterly, with the eclipse of rail shipping, being redeveloped as desirable residential accommodation, upscale restaurants and fashionable shopping precincts; and

(7) the latterly notorious North-Central district, an area of low-rent housing nowadays characterised by serious problems of crime, drug use and prostitution.

According to the 22 November 2004 report of the Regina Planning Commission to the Mayor and City Council, "The current directions of residential [growth] for Regina (northwest, southeast and infill in existing areas of development) were essentially established in 1961…and …[i]n the most recent review of the Development Plan undertaken in 2001, it was determined that these directions continue to be the most appropriate for the next 20 years." An eighth general residential category, therefore, is:

(8) the newer residential subdivisions in the east, north and northwest precincts of the city, planned in anticipation of gradual urban growth over several decades, a development which now with Saskatchewan's recent and unexpected economic boom is occurring in a matter of years rather than decades.

== Downtown business district ==
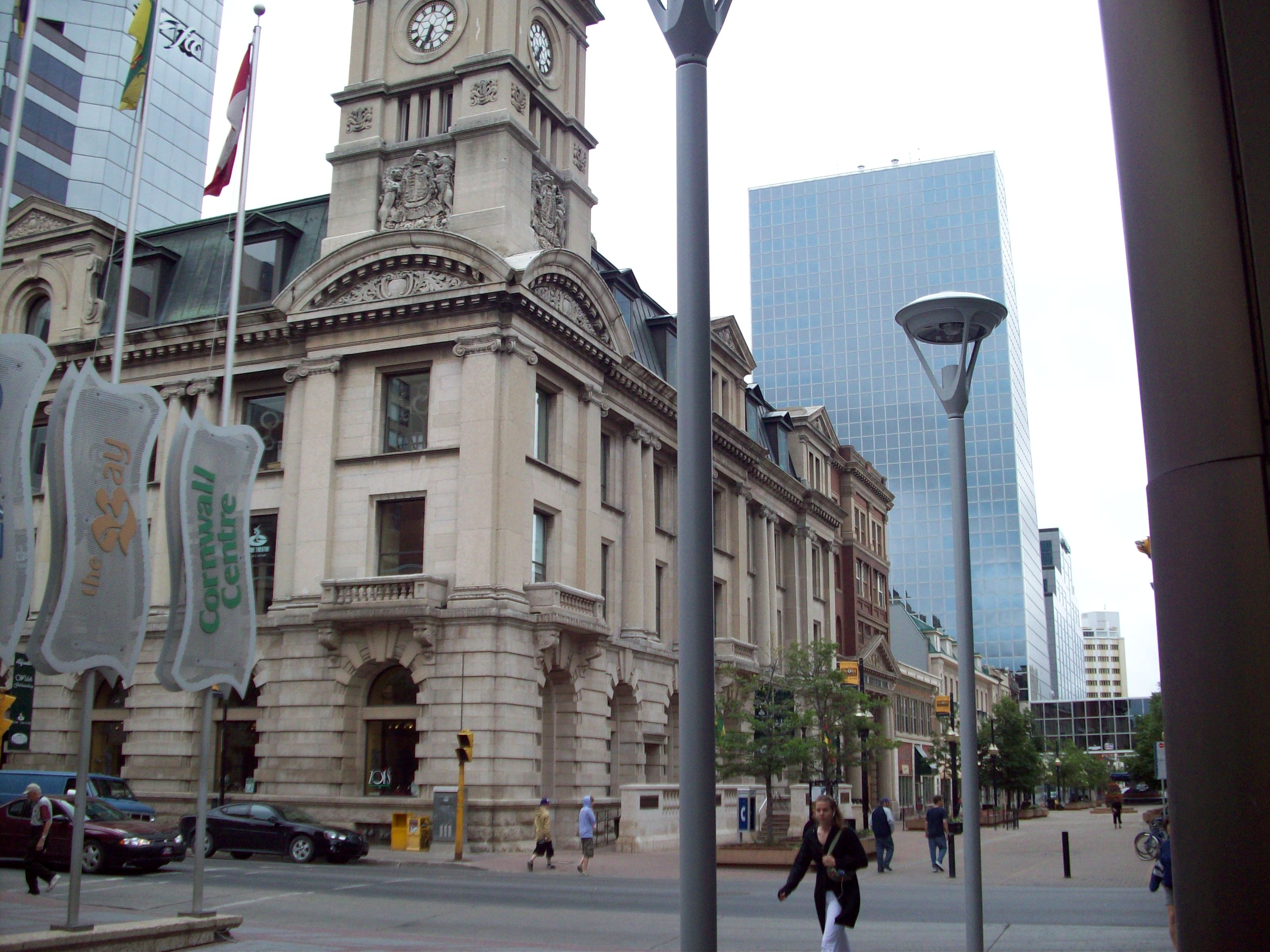
Old Post Office and Scarth Street Mall, among other downtown precincts increasingly turned from commercial to residential use. Note East Tower of the new McCallum-Hill buildings in background.

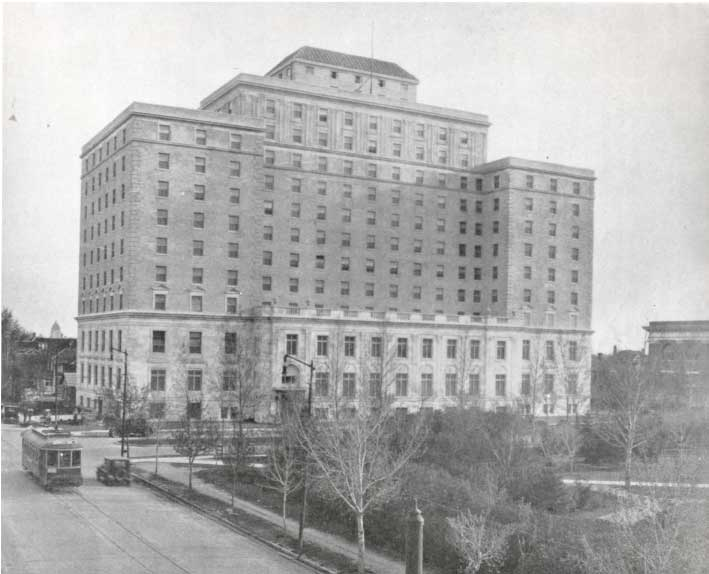
Hotel Saskatchewan on Victoria Avenue, south side of Victoria Park, circa 1930.

The downtown business district, latterly and somewhat confusingly to the historically minded deemed "Market Square" by civic boosters (the historic Market Square was on the current site of the Regina City Police headquarters and was the site of the Regina Riot), is located between Saskatchewan Drive and the CPR line to the north, Albert Street to the west, Broad Street to the East and Victoria Avenue to the south. The historical heart of Regina and noted nationally for its widespread destruction in the Regina Cyclone of 1912, it is nowadays possibly more to be noted for its former significance as commercial and residential growth has relocated to the periphery of the city, and indeed many historically significant landmarks and buildings have long since been demolished and forgotten.

New apartment buildings and condominium residential development in older commercial and office buildings in, for example, the Scarth Street Mall and the Motherwell Building, show promise of revitalising the city core; the Cornwall Centre, an impressive inner city shopping mall originally with Eaton's and Hudson's Bay Company department stores as its anchors together with large cinemas, has not yet thrived but growing posh residential redevelopment could spur new vitality if urban crime spilling over from North Central can be stemmed. Former commercial and office facilities along Scarth Street are now strata title apartments. Historic entertainment venues and churches have largely lapsed but the Globe Theatre has relocated from the Saskatchewan Centre of the Arts to the Old Post Office on 11th Avenue; the conversion of the Union Station to a casino and the construction of several new hotels are bringing new night life vitality to the Central Business District, albeit with the urgent caveat that urban crime spilling over from the North Central remains a serious issue. Currently, the downtown covers 82 hectares, 0.82 km^{2} (0.32 sq mi).

== "Cathedral Area" (the West End) ==
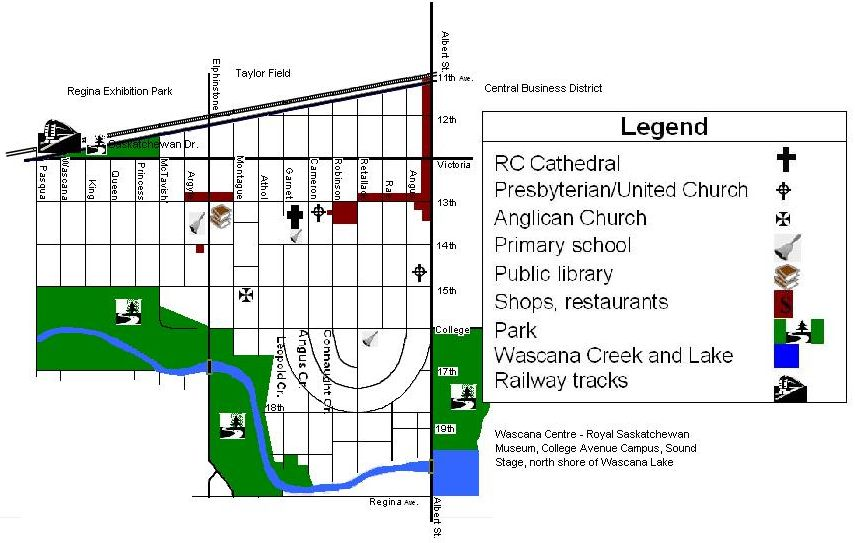
West End ("Cathedral Area") and the Crescents, showing location relative to Exhibition Park, Taylor Field, central business district, Wascana Creek and Wascana Lake. Weir holding back Wascana Lake is under the Albert Street Bridge.

In 1927, the City of Regina passed its first zoning bylaw, setting the patterns for land use in the area. Over time, additional bylaws encouraged the construction of high-density housing, which replaced older housing near Albert Street. A 235-hectare (581 acres) largely residential area west of downtown Regina, this neighbourhood is defined as the area west of Albert Street, northeast of Wascana Creek and south of the CPR mainline. The area has some commercial properties on the north and east and along the 13th Avenue shopping district, the neighbourhood's main street.

Holy Rosary Roman Catholic Cathedral on 13th Avenue opened in 1913, and it is the source of real estate agents' now popular sobriquet of the "Cathedral Area," the area previously having been known as the West End. Immediately to the east of Holy Rosary on 13th Avenue is Westminster United (formerly Presbyterian) Church, also a construction of 1913, and the other major place of worship in the West End. When Holy Rosary found itself without a meeting house after the catastrophic fire of 1976 Westminster gladly provided it with a worship space for the duration of the repairs. In recent years the West End has come to be perceived both as a bohemian enclave and an area of economic need. There are, however, pockets of decidedly affluent housing throughout the Cathedral Area, extending intermittently from the immediate west of Albert Street right to Pasqua Street. Holy Rosary Cathedral has always been a centre of high culture in Regina and Westminster Presbyterian, later United, Church has been an élite bastion throughout its history while never forsaking its liberal Evangelical Protestant mandate of doing good as well as being good. Both Holy Rosary and Westminster (perhaps as well as St Mary's Anglican in the Crescents) draw parishioners — and make it a matter of urgency that they do so — not only from among the British élite but also from among the less advantaged persons in their geographical purview.

On the perimeter of the West End on Albert Street is First Presbyterian Church, built in 1926 and founded by non-concurring dissidents from Westminster, Knox and Carmichael United Churches who objected to their several Presbyterian Church congregations' entry into the United Church of Canada — all Regina Presbyterian congregations had entered into the United Church. First Presbyterian, however, is perhaps a church more of the posh South Albert and Lakeview precincts than of the West End, the latter having been amply served by the two existing United Churches of Westminster and Wascana. (Wascana's plain vernacular style wooden meeting house originally stood on 14th Avenue as Fourteenth Avenue Methodist Church and was moved in 1925 to its new site at 13th and Pasqua; it was sold in the 1960s when Wascana United built a new church; the congregation subsequently merged with that of Westminster.)

By the 1970s, inner-city problems had arisen to some extent — declining and aging population, decreasing quality of housing stock, increasing crime, heavier vehicular traffic and fewer parking places — although, unlike other older residential areas of town, the population base and indeed the number of young families remained sufficiently high that the now nearly century-old Connaught Public and Holy Rosary Separate Schools remained continuously in use while several other elementary schools were demolished and not replaced. By the middle of the 1970s, area residents organised the Cathedral Area Community Association. Through the work of the associations — as well as joint municipal, provincial and federal social programs — local conditions improved. In addition, the spread on non-residential properties and high-density housing was controlled, and a large number of older homes in the area were renovated extensively. The Cathedral Area in recent years has become a desirable residential neighbourhood by reason of its latter-day atmosphere of rakishness: the old Sacred Heart Academy, formerly a private girls' high school operated by the Western Canada-based Sisters of Our Lady of the Missions, immediately adjacent to the Roman Catholic Cathedral on 13th Avenue at Garnet Street, has been redeveloped as tony townhouses; many formerly rundown houses have been expensively renovated. On the other hand, recent cuts to the Cathedral Area Community Association have put many of the community programs and festivals, that created the renewed atmosphere, in jeopardy.

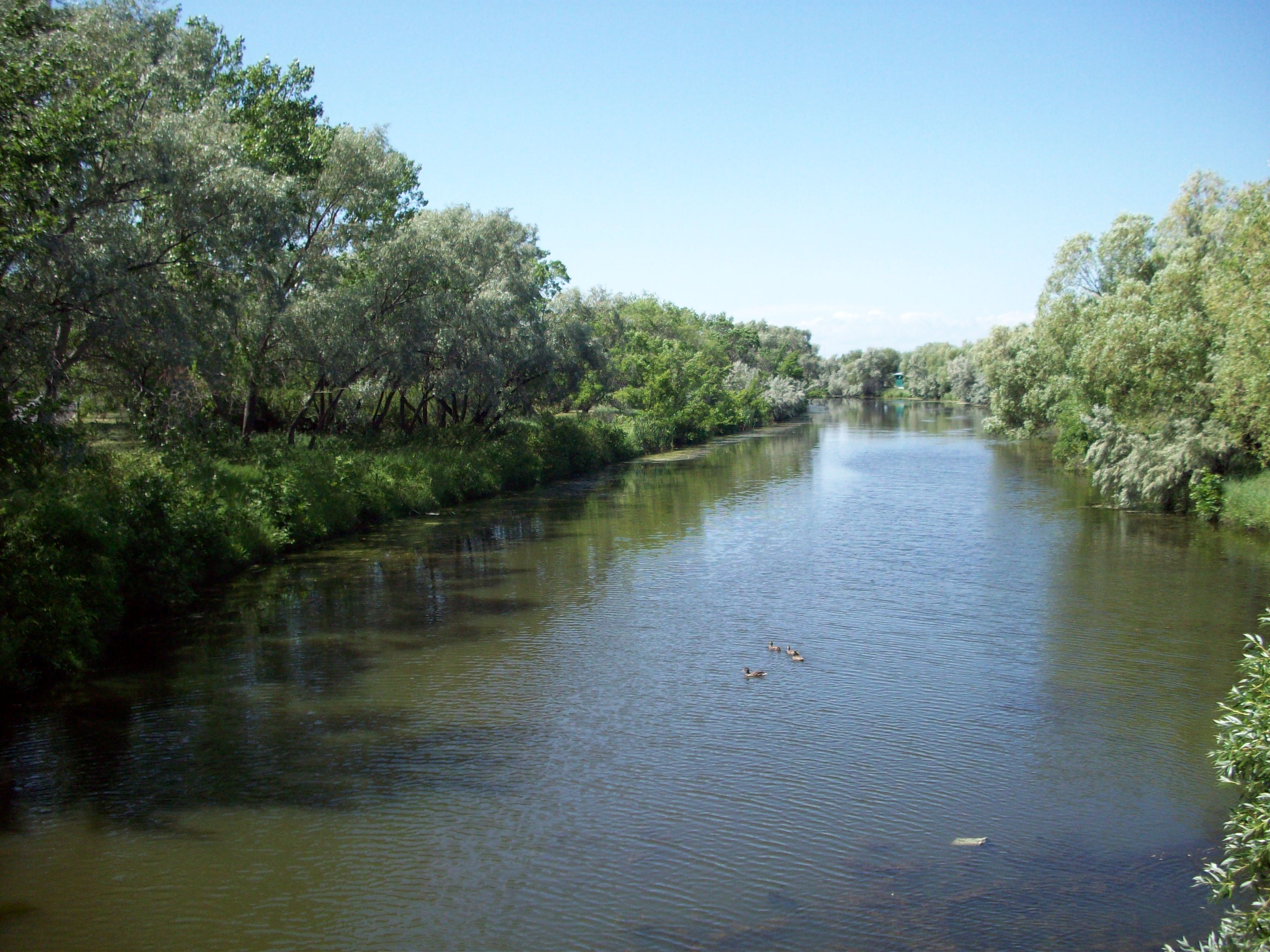
Wascana Creek in Les Sherman Park, West End, downstream from the Albert Street Bridge and Wascana Lake

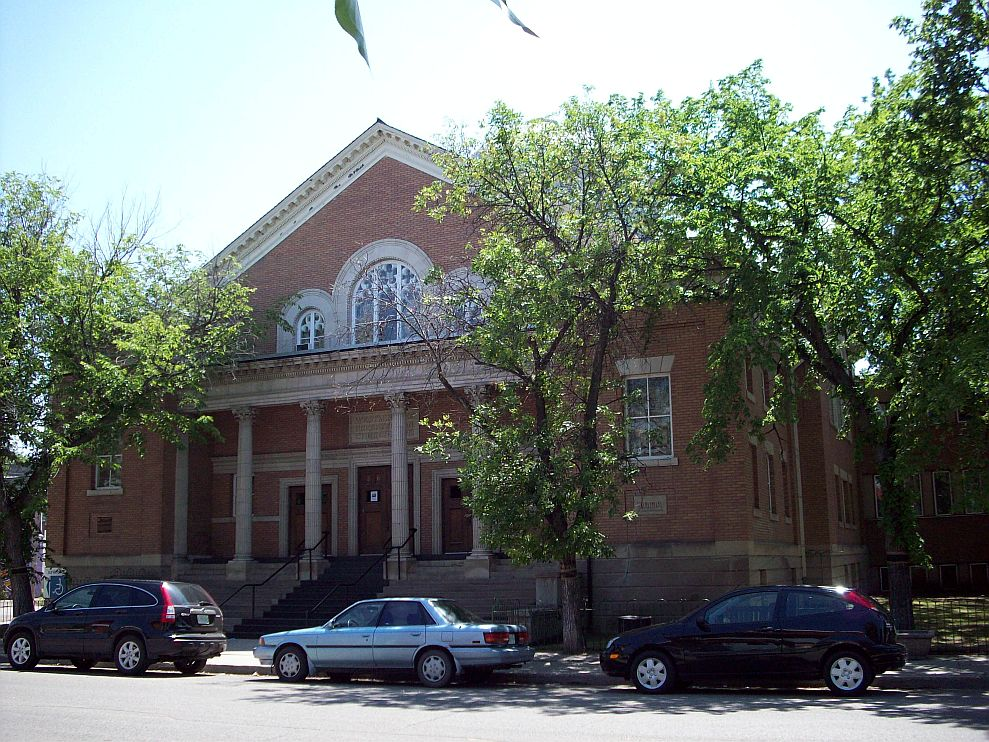
Westminster Presbyterian, later United, Church on 13th Avenue, next door to Holy Rosary Cathedral

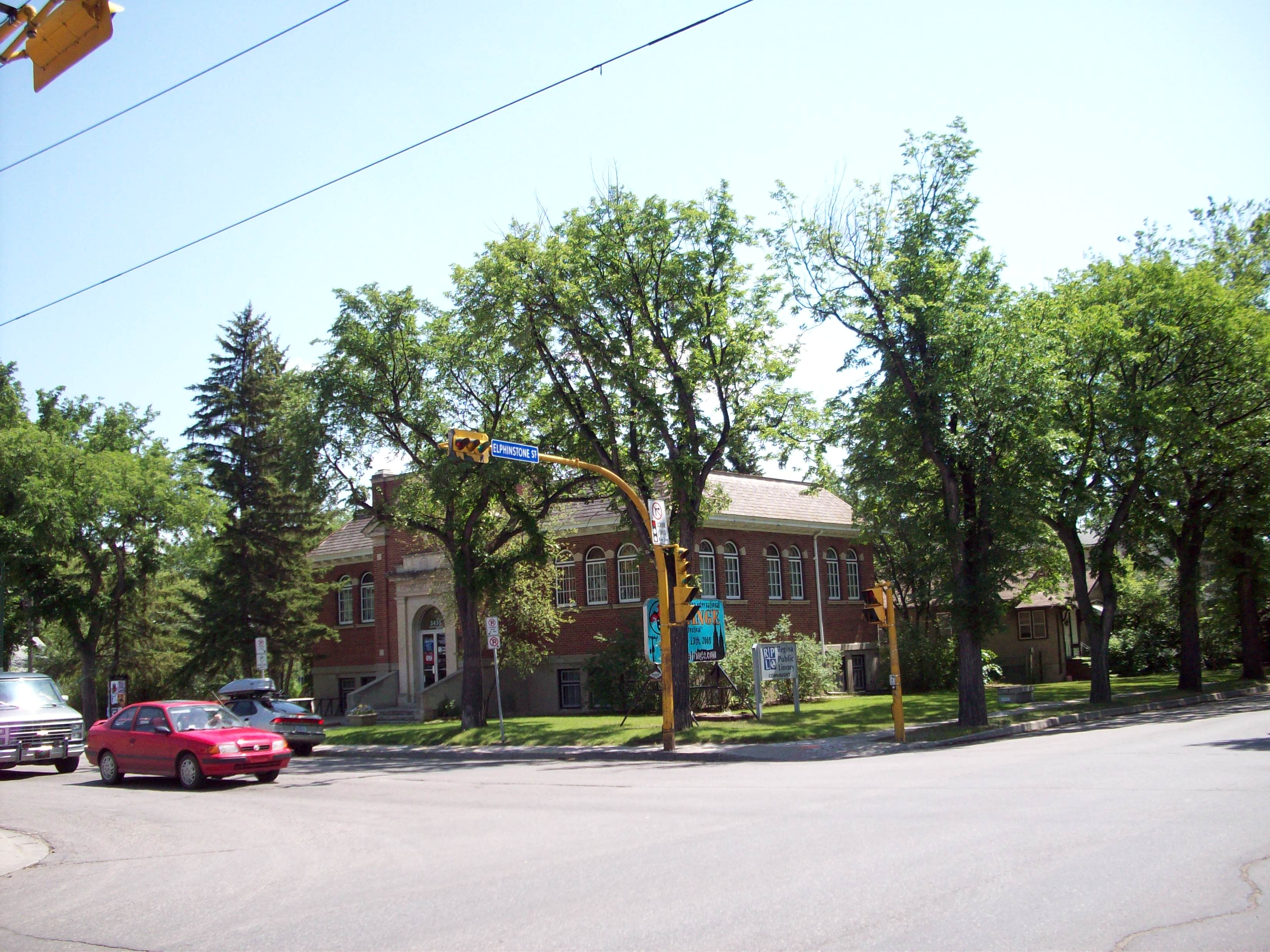
Connaught Public Library, corner of 13th Avenue and Elphinstone Street, opposite Connaught Public School

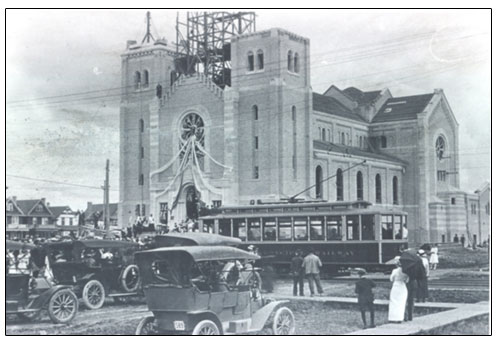
Blessing of Holy Rosary Cathedral, 3125 13th Avenue at Garnet Street, 1913

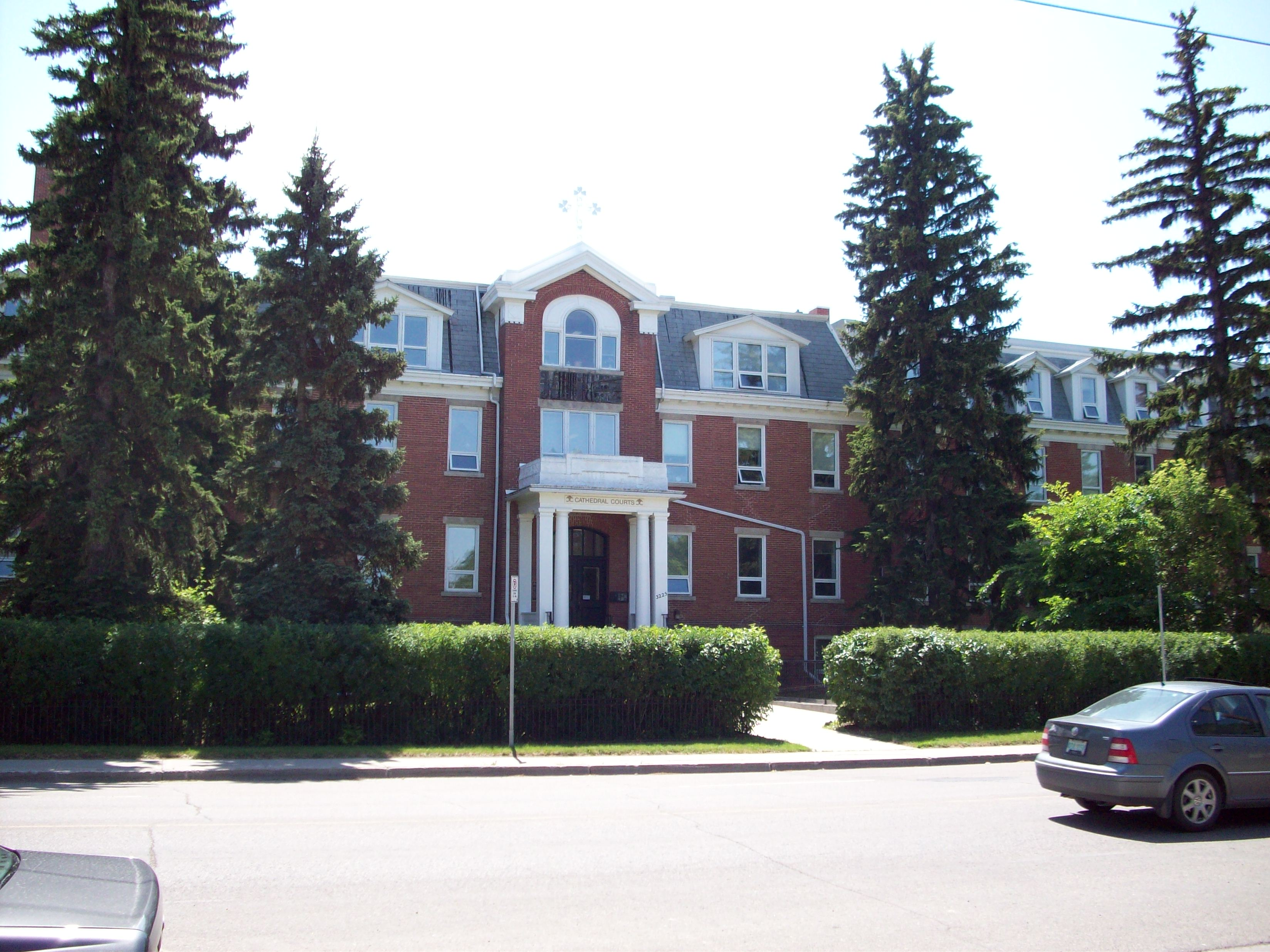
The former Sacred Heart Academy, now converted to private strata-title residences, but also housing the Roman Catholic Synod Office

== The Crescents ==
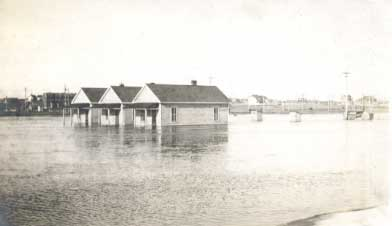
1915 flood: Wascana Creek overflowing its banks is pictured near Rotary Park immediately adjacent to the Crescents.

The Crescents, taking its name from Leopold, Angus and Connaught Crescents, the principal residential streets in the precinct, is the historically most desirable residential area of Regina. In zoning parlance a part of the "Cathedral area," it is a discrete residential zone, its posh 1920s villas, mock-Tudor ambience and large lots a striking contrast to the more matter-of-factly working persons' housing of the 13th Avenue neighbourhood. It made the list of "Best Old House Neighborhoods 2011: City Living" in This Old House Magazine.

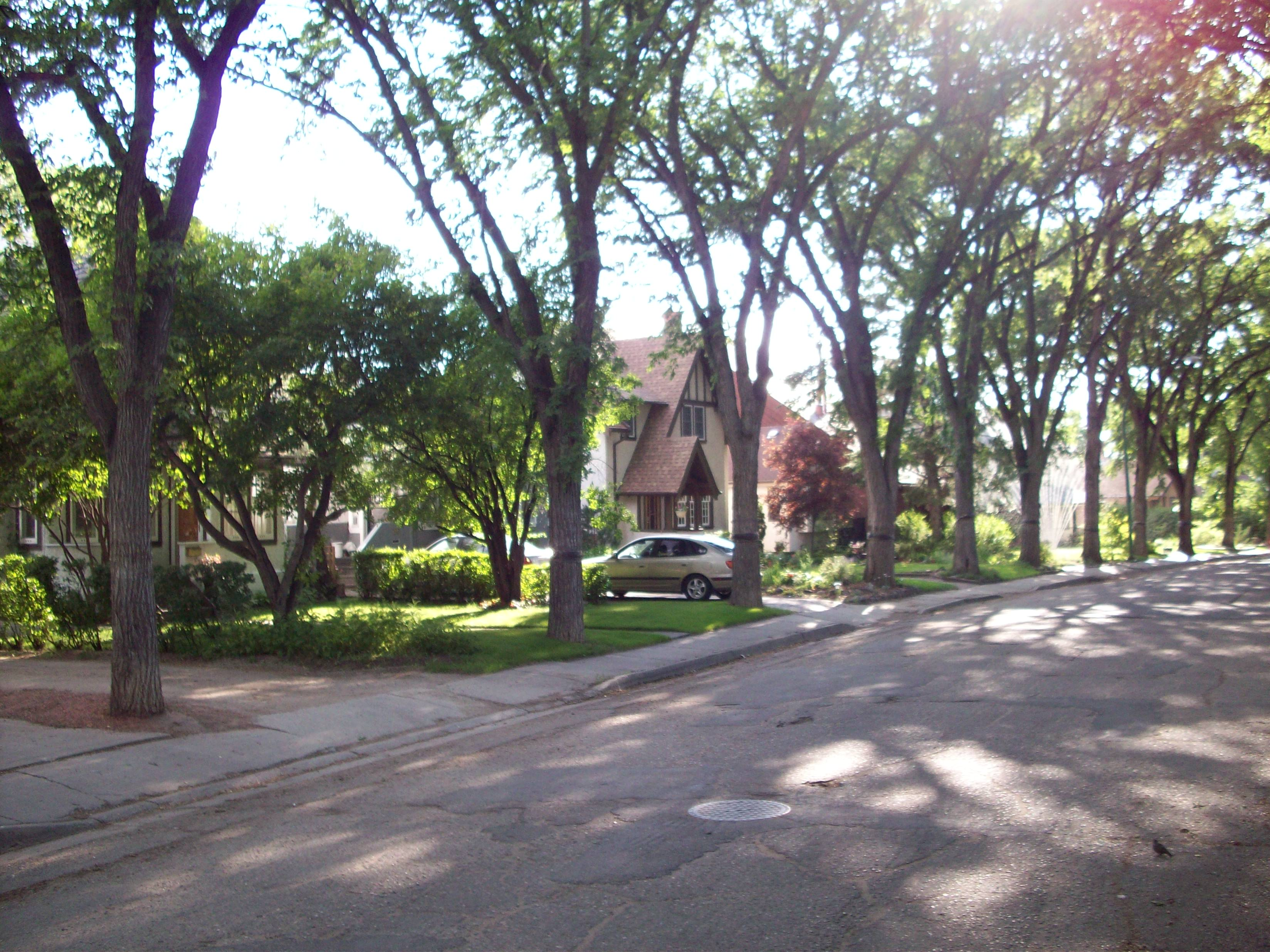
Leopold Crescent. The elm avenues are seriously endangered by Dutch Elm Disease.

Originally a property development of the McCallum-Hill property company to the immediate north of Wascana Creek after the Wascana bridge was relocated to the east of its original location, it soon became one of Regina's most attractive and prestigious residential neighbourhoods. Regina's Roman Catholic Archbishop and Anglican Dean live here, as do many of Regina's social élite. It is wholly devoid of any commercial development; the only local church is the Anglican Church of St Mary the Virgin and non-Anglican church-going locals are largely parishioners of the "Cathedral Area" Holy Rosary Cathedral and Westminster United Church on 13th Avenue and First Presbyterian on Albert Street. The local primary school, Davin Public School, is named for Nicholas Flood Davin. Low-lying areas immediately adjacent to Wascana Creek are less desirable (and contain less impressive residences) owing to their being subject to flooding in particularly wet springs when the creek overflows its banks; a flood in 1915 is pictured; the most severe flood in the city's history occurred in 1971.

== Albert Street South ==
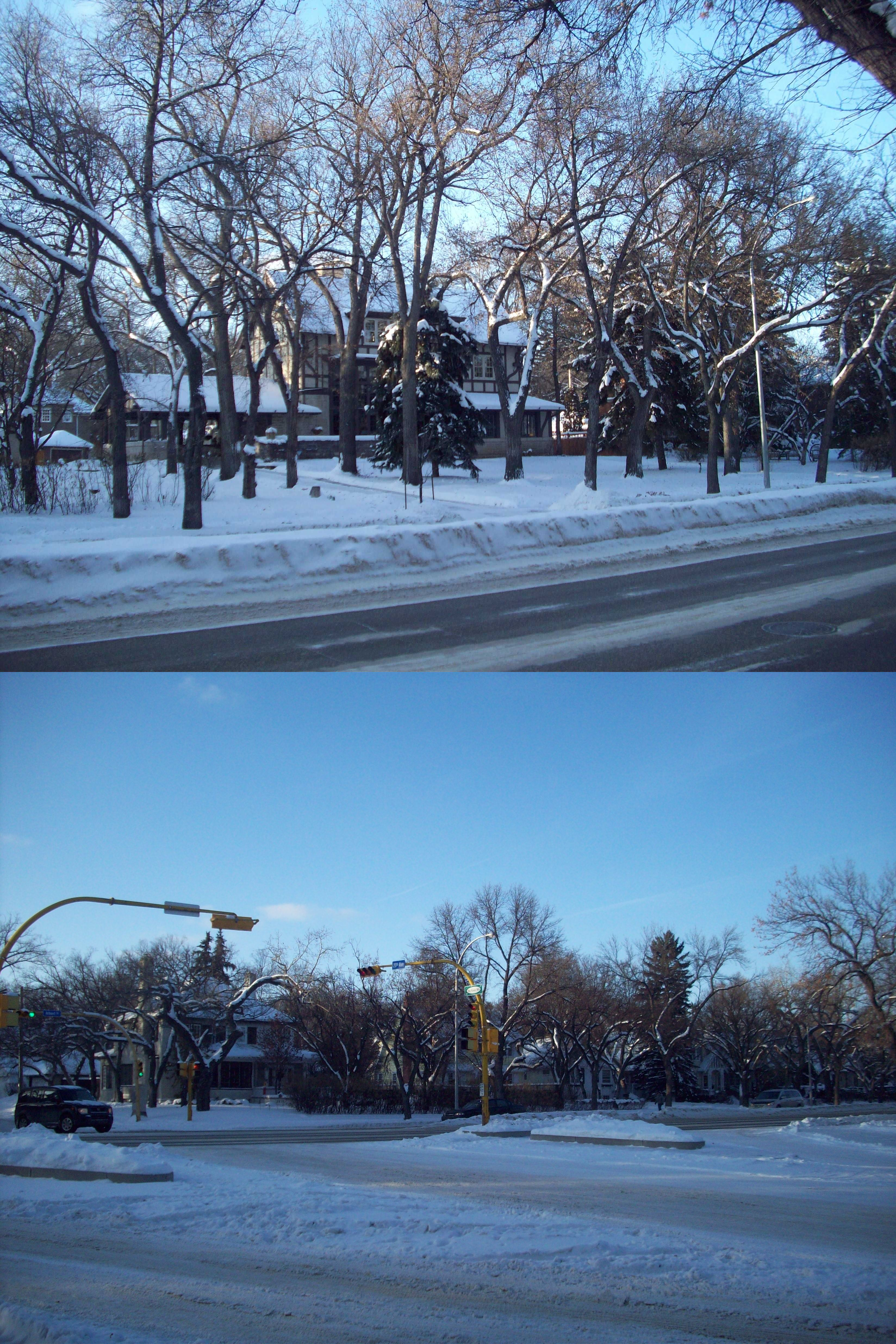
Mansions on South Albert Street

The McCallum-Hill property development company pounced on the opportunity provided by the new Albert Street bridge, developing an imposing row of still-impressive mansions along south Albert Street and in the immediately adjacent old Lakeview precinct during the years immediately following the establishment of the province of Saskatchewan and designation of Regina as the provincial capital through until the beginning of the depression.

The mansions of Walter Hill (built in 1911), E.D. McCallum (1912) and H.M. McCallum (1913), the principals of the McCallum-Hill company, remain standing on Albert Street South; the Hill residence is a designated municipal heritage site; the E.D. McCallum house was owned by the Sisters of the Precious Blood and used by them as an enclosed convent from 1948 to 1959.

Regina's early promise soon failed with the stock market crash of 1929 and the long years of prairie drought which followed; the neighbourhood remains the closest approximation in Regina to Toronto's Forest Hill and Bridle Path.

== Germantown and the East End ==
=== Germantown proper ===
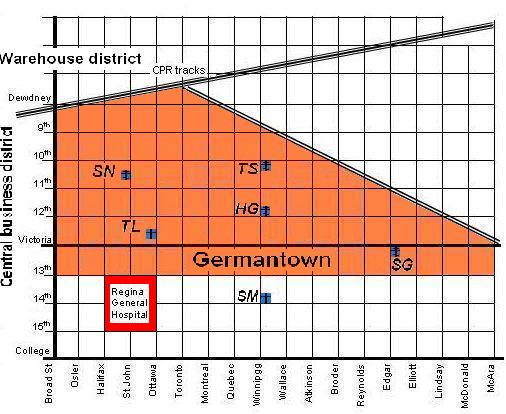
Map of Germantown, approx. Broad Street east to Winnipeg Street and beyond, and College Avenue north to the CPR Yards. TL = Trinity Lutheran (old building); HG = Ukrainian Orthodox Church of the Descent of the Holy Ghost; TS = Holy Trinity Serbian Orthodox Church; SG = St George's Romanian Orthodox Cathedral; SN = St Nicholas's Romanian Orthodox Church; SM = St Matthew's Anglican Church, outside Germantown.

The area known as Germantown (Broad Street east to Winnipeg Street and beyond — the precise eastern and southern perimeter is somewhat amorphous — and somewhat to the north of College Avenue to the CPR Yards) was settled by continental Europeans: Germans, Romanians, Hungarians, Serbs, Ukrainians, Poles, essentially anyone neither British Isles, French nor aboriginal in ancestry. In the early-predominant Anglo-Celtic mainstream non-francophone continental Europeans whatever their origin were generally referred to either as "Galicians" (Galicia at the time actually being Austrian Poland) or as "Germans."

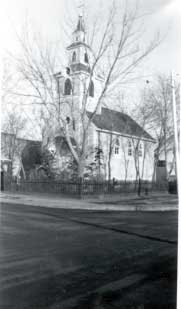
Holy Trinity Serbian Orthodox Church, Winnipeg Street in the heart of Germantown

Europeans became established around the former Market Square (now the location of the Regina city police station on Osler Street between 10th and 11th Avenues) by 1892. German, Ukrainian, Romanian and Serbian religious, secular and educational institutions and services were early established in the neighbourhood — including St Nicholas's Romanian Orthodox Church (established in 1902), the oldest Romanian Orthodox parish in North America; St George's Cathedral (founded in 1914 though the present building dates from the early 1960s), the episcopal seat of the Romanian Orthodox Bishop of Regina; and the now long-demolished Holy Trinity Serbian Orthodox Church and the Ukrainian Orthodox Church of the Descent of the Holy Ghost, both formerly on Winnipeg Street. St. Mary's Roman Catholic Church on Winnipeg Street between Victoria and 13th Avenues assumed its name when the downtown parish now called Blessed Sacrament, whose building was originally on Cornwall Street north of Victoria Park and is now on Scarth Street south of the Park, was renamed. Beth Jacob Synagogue, originally established in 1905 and now re-located to South Regina, was originally also in Germantown.

Regina's city fathers, all of course drawn from the Anglo-Saxon élite, grievously neglected Germantown in the early days and basic services of water and sewerage came scandalously late to the precinct. Many residents of the Germantown quarter of Regina lived in squalid shacks without basic services till well into the 20th century, when issues of loyalty to the British Crown during the First World War were comprehensively resolved in the favour of the residents' complete Canadian-ness. By the 1960s invidious past ethnic prejudice had long since passed and Ukrainian food had become pan-Saskatchewan food. Apart from German Lutheran and Roman Catholic establishments throughout Regina, however, European churches and cultural clubs remain concentrated in Germantown.

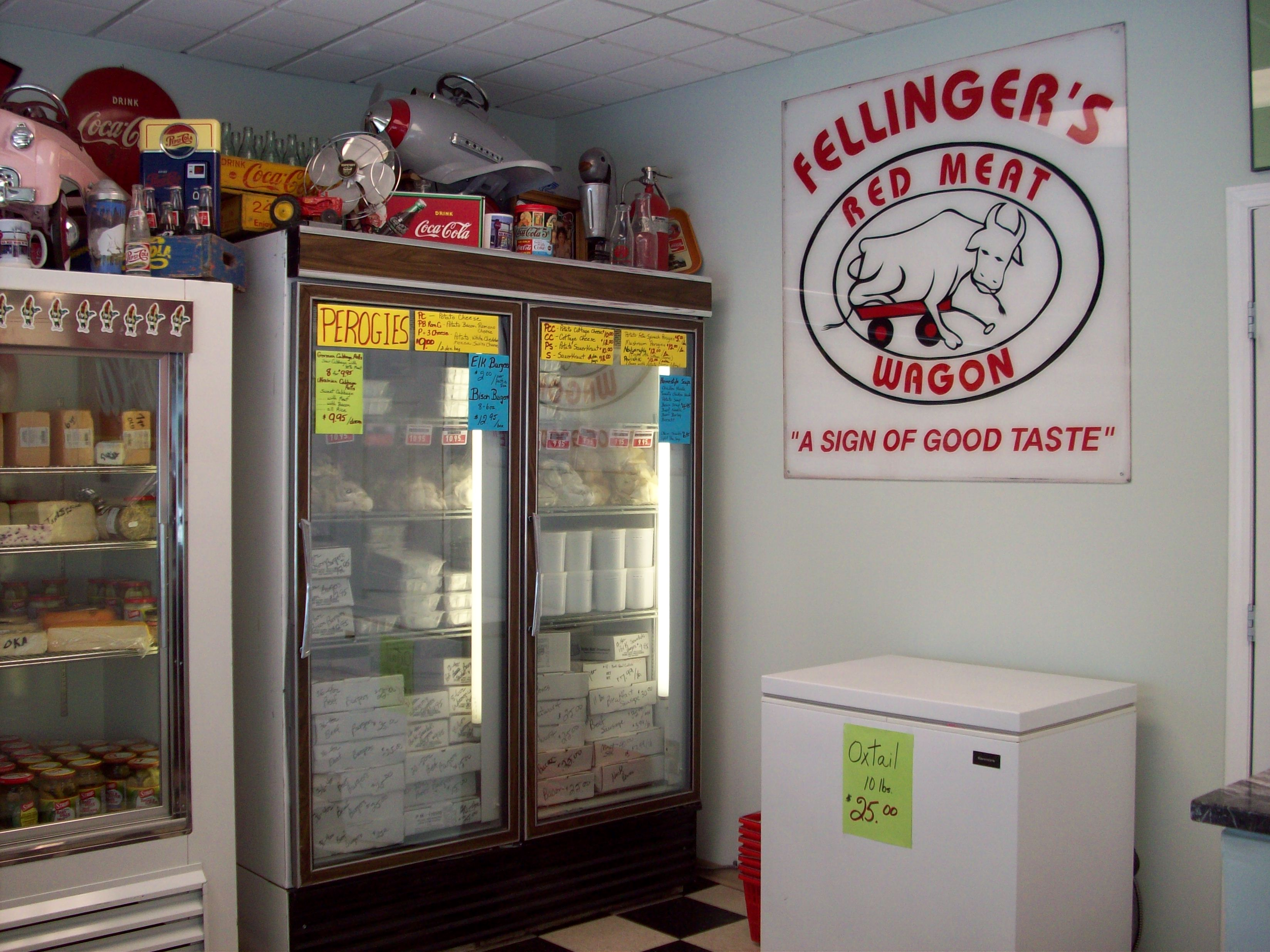
German delicatessen, long a Germantown institution, now relocated to 13th Avenue in the West End as Germantown constituents have spread throughout Regina and Reginans generally have absorbed European culture and adopted it as their own

Trinity Lutheran Church — now occupying a large but undistinguished A-frame building on Ottawa Street in the heart of Germantown — remains the centre of Regina's Lutheran constituency and large ecclesiastical functions are generally held there, though Canadian Lutheranism, while maintaining the historic episcopacy and indeed being in full communion with the Anglican Church of Canada, does not designate its principal metropolitan churches cathedrals as such.

(However, despite not having official cathedral status, Trinity is often the location of episcopal events: in 2002 the first woman to become a bishop of the Evangelical Lutheran Church in Canada was ordained at Trinity and installed as Lutheran Bishop of Saskatchewan.) Trinity Lutheran for many years maintained a traditional German-style parish church in Germantown; in due course, when it had built its current new modern building across the street, it sold its impressive German pipe organ to an Anglican parish in Regina.

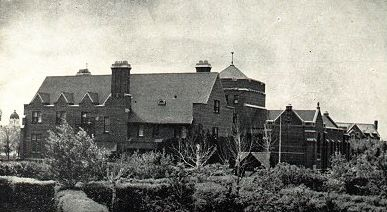
St Chad's College building, originally the theological seminary for the Diocese of Qu'Appelle, later the premises for the Qu'Appelle Diocesan School, renamed St Chad's School in 1962 and closed in 1970

=== The WASP East End ===
On the southeastern periphery of Germantown, where British Isles-descended Canadians settled after the turn of the century, is St Matthew's Anglican Church, one of only three substantial historic Anglican parish churches in Regina, the other two being St. Paul's in the city centre and St Mary's in the Crescents.

(Carmichael United, formerly Presbyterian, Church, an imposing building with fine stained glass, an impressive Casavant Frères pipe organ and luxurious fittings, some now in the possession of the University of Regina for use at convocation ceremonies, was on 15th Avenue at St. John Street immediately south of Regina General Hospital. Its congregation was a 1925 union of the pre-existing Presbyterian congregation of the same name and in the same building with the neighbouring Wesley Methodist Church; both had been founded in 1912. It closed in 1995 and was subsequently demolished.)

Across College Avenue immediately to the south of Germantown is the former Anglican Diocesan property. It contains the former Qu'Appelle Diocesan School (whose premises were originally a theological seminary for the training of clergy) and Anglican nunnery (with the historic St Chad's Chapel), diocesan administrative buildings, an old people's home and the bishop's palace and was the intended site for a never-built cathedral whose intended site remains visible at the corner of Broad Street and College Avenue, outlined in caragana hedges.

(See Regina's historic buildings and precincts.)

== The Warehouse District ==
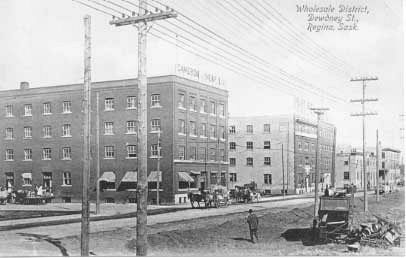
Warehouse district, Dewdney Avenue, circa 1915. Note horse-drawn drays

Not historically a residential neighbourhood, the Warehouse District is immediately to the north and east of the downtown central business district, beyond the CPR rail line (see map, below).

Before the highways were upgraded to the extent that they permitted trans-Canada commercial shipping by road within Canada, and did not require trucking companies to dip below the 49th parallel to traverse the Great Lakes, and prior to the emergence of the airlines as a preferred mode of passenger travel and freight carriage, the railways were, as Prime Minister John A. Macdonald's National Policy had envisaged, at first the sole and for long the principal conduit linking Canada together. In Regina the warehouses were commercial depots for the receipt of goods from eastern Canada and the USA. With the eclipse of the railroads by the highways the Warehouse District lost its original raison d’être and for a time the warehouses seemed in danger of becoming white elephants.

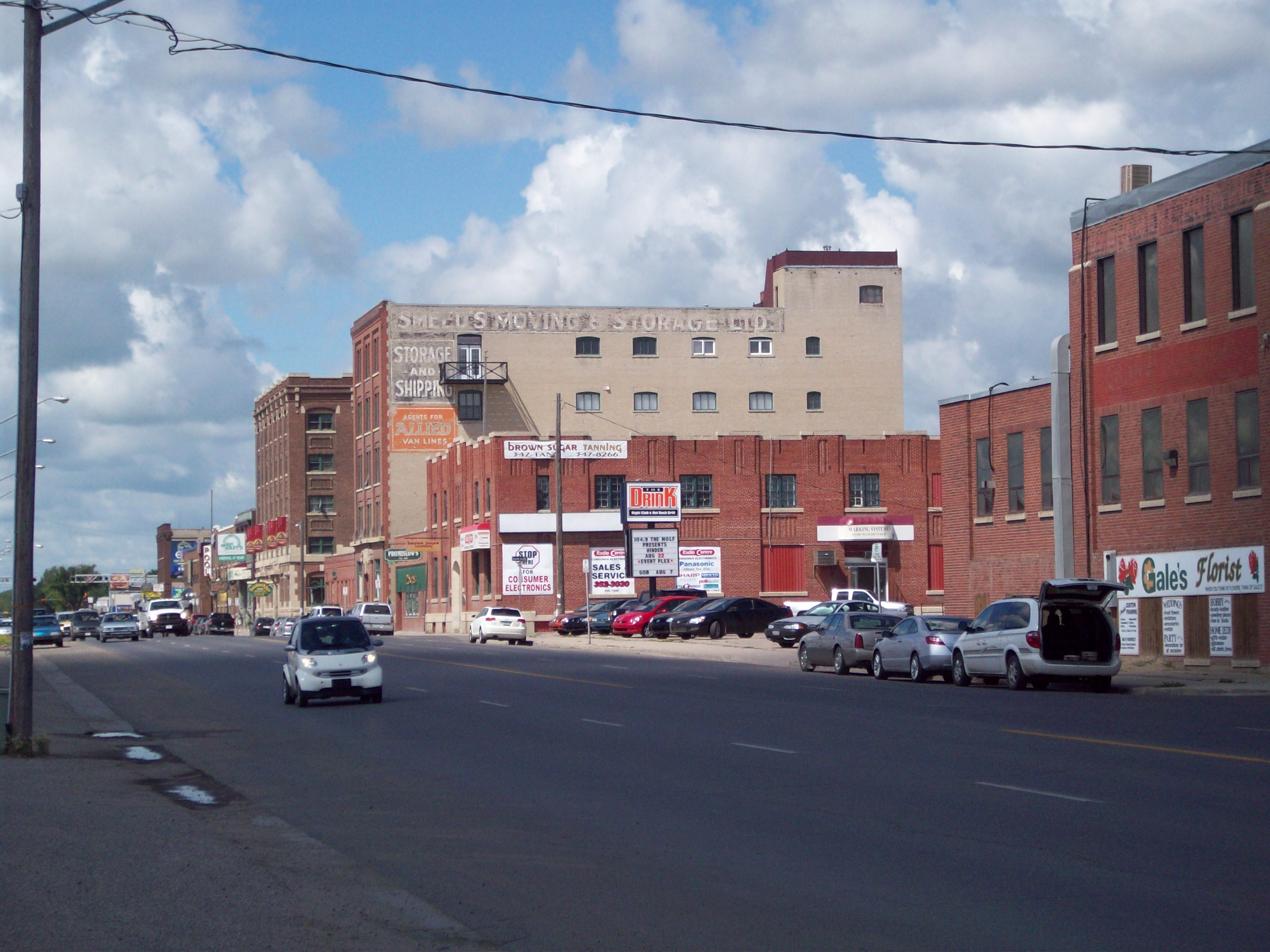
Warehouse District, Dewdney Avenue, 2008

Beginning in the 1970s and ‘80s imaginative property developers took their cue from the transformation of similarly outmoded warehouse districts in major eastern North American cities – television dramas and comedies set in New York, Chicago and Toronto and house-beautiful home decoration magazines played a considerable part – and began transforming the increasingly idle warehouses into tony restaurants and shopping precincts, live music clubs, condominiums and loft apartments which had the amenity of immediate proximity to professional employment venues in the central business district, just across the CPR tracks, and retail outlets in the new Cornwall Centre and elsewhere in the central business district.

The Warehouse District has become a highly desirable night life precinct and residential address in Regina and appears likely to become a salutary exception to the general trend of commercial and residential development during the postwar years away from the city centre to the periphery.

== North Central ==
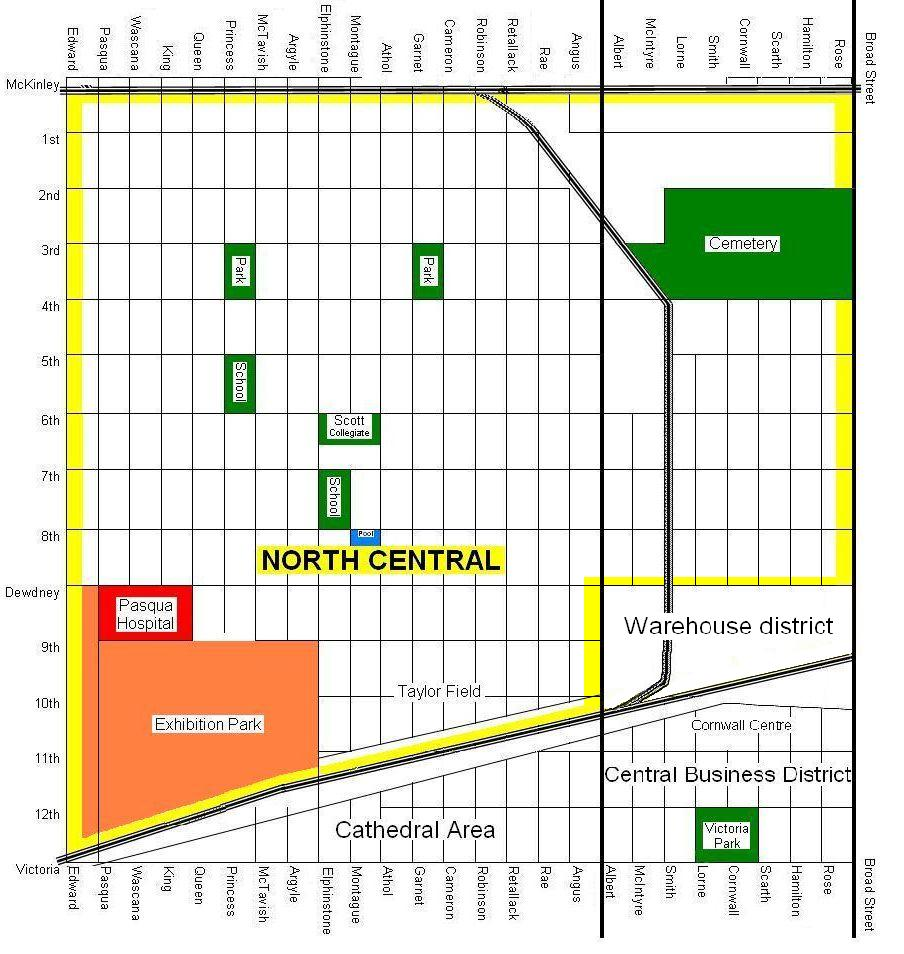
Map of North Central (outlined in yellow), north of the CPR tracks between Pasqua (or Lewvan) and Broad Streets north to McKinley Avenue, except for the Warehouse District, south of Dewdney Avenue and east of Albert Street. The Warehouse District is shown and also the northern sectors of the Cathedral area and the downtown business district south of the CPR tracks. The map shows Exhibition Park; Pasqua Hospital, the old Regina cemetery; Scott Collegiate, Herchmer and Kitchener public schools and Sacred Heart separate school.

North Central is contained within a trapezium described by the CPR tracks to the south, which divides North Central from the downtown business district; Broad Street to the east; Alexandra Street (two blocks west of Pasqua) to the west; and McKinley Avenue to the north. The increasingly tony Warehouse District being historically a non-residential sector and not part of North Central, is an exception to the generally depressed economic circumstances of the region immediately north of the CPR tracks and is appropriately hived off from the map.

The largest of Regina's inner city neighbourhoods, it was originally established in the mid-1880s to accommodate European labourers working on the Canadian Pacific Railway. It subsequently became a prosperous middle class precinct. By way of example, St Andrew's Presbyterian, later United Church — originally a mission congregation of Knox Presbyterian, like Carmichael Presbyterian to the south of Germantown and Lakeview United Church to the south of Wascana Creek — thrived from its founding in 1907 in the 2700 block, Dewdney Avenue through the building of an impressive though austere large church at Dewdney and Athol in 1951, the vitality and prosperity of the United Church and of WASPs in North Central demonstrated by the mortgage on the new building being retired after only four years in 1955 until North Central's changing demographic and the congregation's drastically waning numbers forced it to close at the turn of the 21st century.

Since the federal government's amendments to the Indian Act (R.S., 1985, c. I-5) removed restrictions on mobility of Status Indians (a Status Indian being an aboriginal person who is registered under the Act: see Indian Act), the neighbourhood's aboriginal population has steadily risen; current estimates show that one-third of the neighbourhood's 12,000-odd population is of aboriginal ethnicity.

The neighbourhood has been the subject of controversy and concern in recent years due to the high concentration of poverty, prostitution, and rundown rental housing. It is estimated that there are more IV drug users in North-Central per capita than in Vancouver's Downtown Eastside. Although crime rates in the area remain relatively high, they have fallen in recent years due to efforts by the Regina Police Service and several agencies, including a stolen vehicle program, an anti-drug strategy, and an increase in the number of police officers in the area. This has been a national trend for some time. As of November 2006, nearly 18% of the crime in Regina occurred in this neighbourhood, which has less than 6% of the population, or a 153-block area containing approximately (by another estimate) 10,500 people.

In recent years the local government's commitment to invest in the inner-city has been questioned in view of its attempts to close inner-city library branches and a proposal to implement a base tax which would have lowered property taxes in outlying areas, where average household income for all residents is more than triple that of all residents in the inner city — but would have increased taxes for inner-city properties. A change in funding structure will result in the three low income neighbourhoods of Cathedral Area, Al Ritchie and Argyle Park having funding reduced by $40,000 collectively and North Central having funding increased by $15,000. The $494,000 necessary to reach this target have not been fully provided.

Positive efforts to engage the social problems in North-Central include the Inner City Family Foundation, community association programs and a rental property inspection team provided via a volunteer organization. The City of Regina has legal authority to create a rental licensing program and an inspection team, but has not yet implemented either of these solutions. At the beginning of 2007, City Council increased funding for six inner-city community associations by $19,000, but disbursed the total $369,000 to an additional 18 associations.

A January 2007 article in Maclean's has helped prompt the city government to look at new ways of providing better housing to residents. The mayor has met with First Nations chiefs to create a dialogue, the first time during his six-year tenure in office. Also, It has spurred renewed discussion of establishing Regina's first urban reserve within the city, in association with the Piapot Cree Nation. Several years ago, the City of Regina negotiated a servicing agreement with the Nekaneet First Nation to establish an urban reserve in the northeast Industrial Area. The reserve has not yet been approved by the federal government.

== Newer residential subdivisions ==
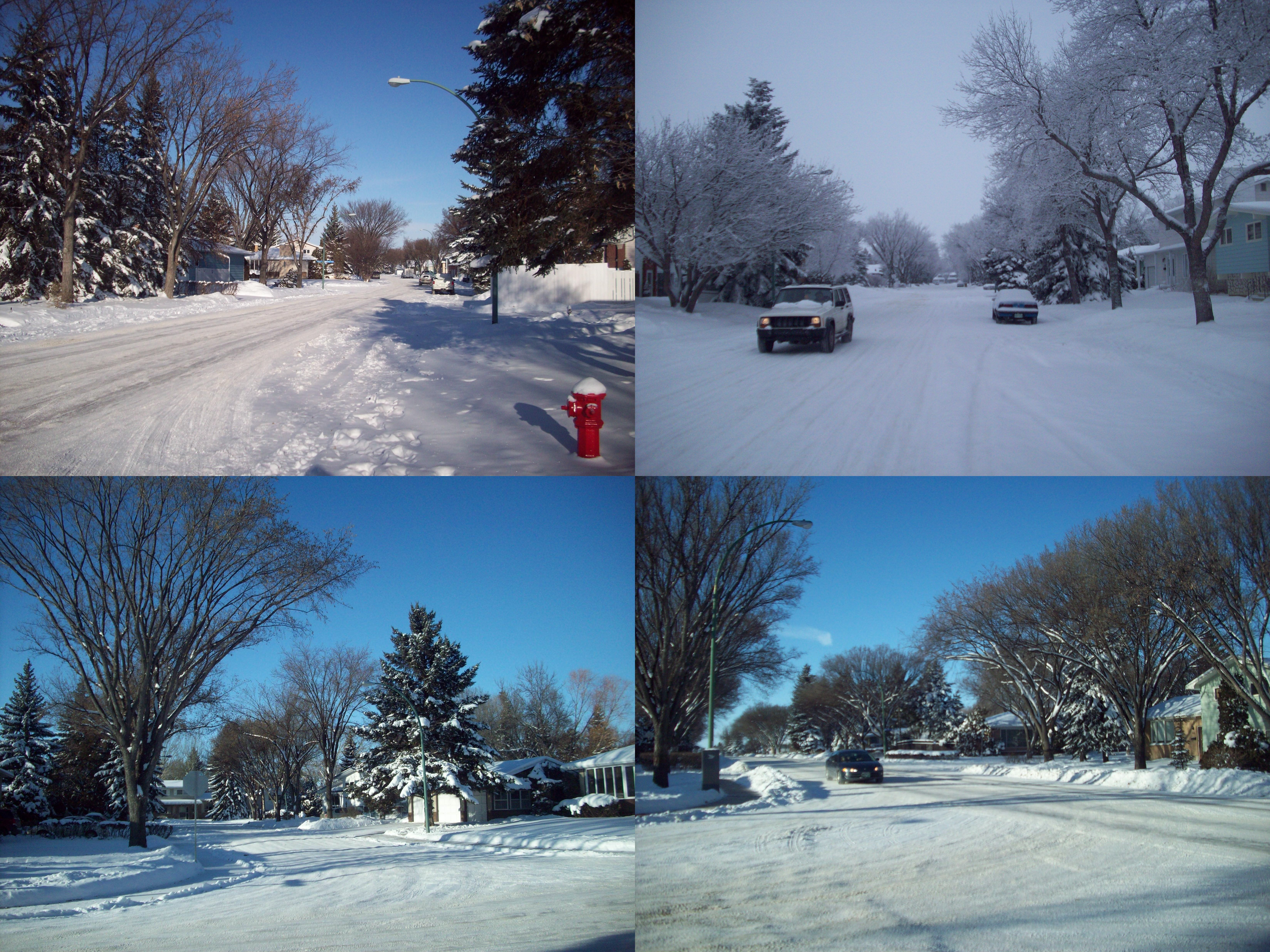
Residential streetscapes in south Regina subdivision of Albert Park, developed in the 1960s

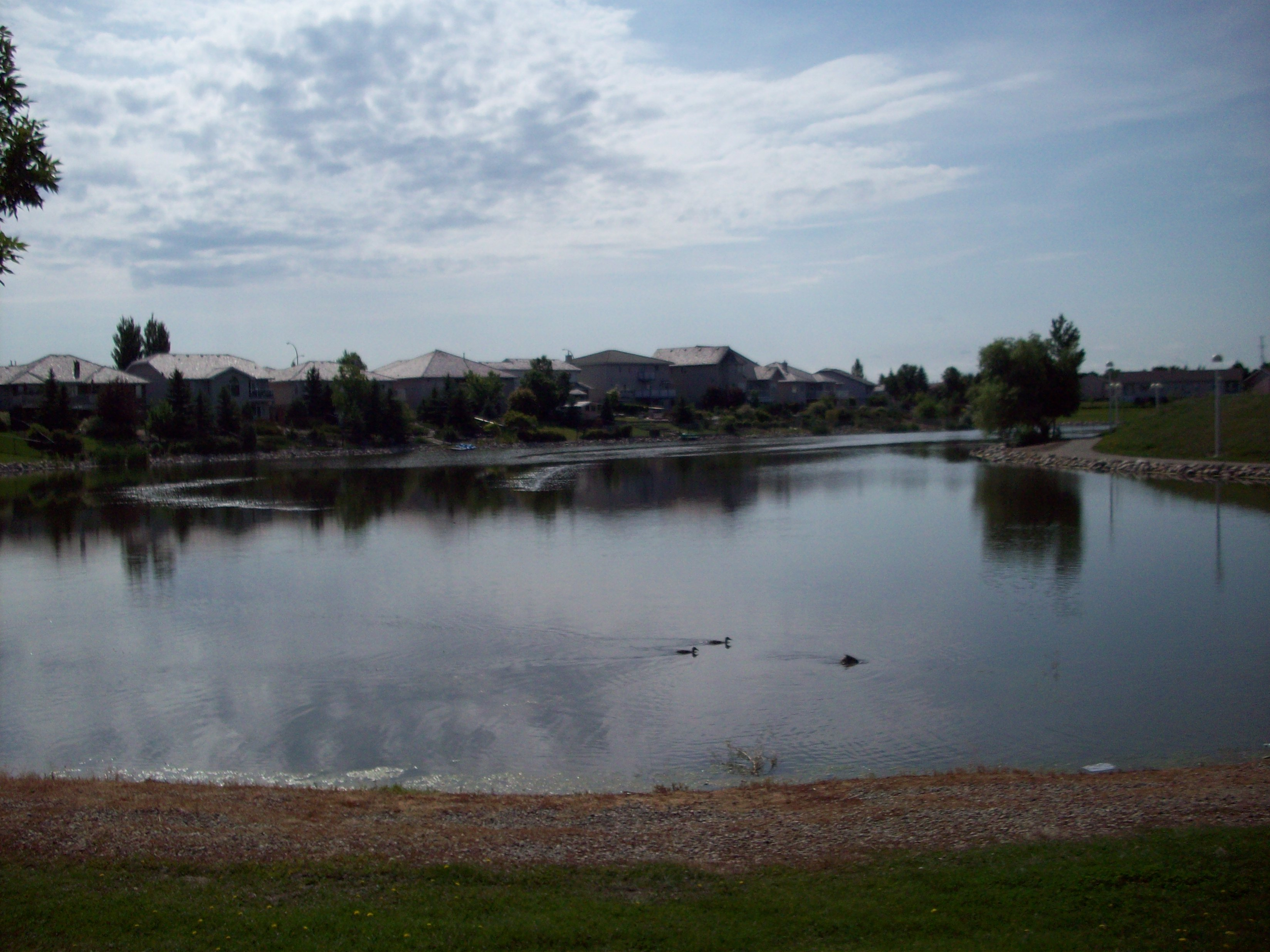
Decorative storm reservoir in the east Regina subdivision of Windsor Park, characteristic of both eastern and northern new residential subdivisions

There is an increasingly likely population explosion in Saskatchewan cities and towns as the economy continues to boom at a rate unprecedented since the 1920s. Regina urban planners confront the issue of making new Regina neighbourhoods suitably comfortable for Saskatchewan expatriates long resident elsewhere in North America and now returning to live in the province.

Increasingly also this becomes necessary as to people from elsewhere in Canada and the world who may have rather greater expectations as to urban amenity than previously obtained when Reginans were drawn from the Saskatchewan hinterland and were perhaps somewhat forgiving. School playgrounds, both those associated with functioning schools and those which were former playgrounds of now-closed schools, are increasingly converted to landscaped parks. New residential subdivisions in the north and east sectors of the city nowadays contain an abundance of parks with, frequently, decorative lagoons containing spring run-off and summer rain catchment instead of the older model of utilitarian storm ravines.

== See also ==
- Regina's historic buildings and precincts
