= St. Clair Parkway =

Scenic parkway in Ontario

St. Clair Parkway
- River Road
- St. Clair Parkway highlighted in red

Route information
- Maintained by Chatham–Kent and Lambton County
- Length: 41.8 km (26.0 mi)

Major junctions
- South end: Municipal Road 32 (Dufferin Avenue) west of Wallaceburg
- North end: Churchill Road in Sarnia

Location
- Country: Canada
- Province: Ontario

Highway system
- Parkways of the Great Lakes; Long Sault; Niagara; St. Clair; 1000 Islands; Roads in Ontario

The St. Clair Parkway, historically referred to as the River Road, is a scenic parkway in the Canadian province of Ontario. It travels alongside the St. Clair River from west of Wallaceburg to Sarnia, a distance of 41.8 kilometres (26.0 mi). It formed a portion of the route of Highway 40 until it was bypassed by an inland route that opened in the mid-1970s. The St. Clair River Parkway Commission maintained the route from 1966 until 2006, when it was disbanded and responsibility over the parkway transferred to Chatham-Kent and Lambton County, both of which designate the route as County Road 33. The communities of Port Lambton, Sombra, Courtright, Mooretown, Corunna and Froomfield are located along the parkway, all early settlements of the 19th century.

The River Road was the first overland transportation route in Lambton County, and the only passable road until the 1840s. Although its exact origin is unclear, it was an established road by the 1830s when settlement of the county interior began. It served as a wagon trail until being briefly supplanted by the Erie and Huron Railway after 1886. It regained importance with the rise of the automobile, eventually being designated as a provincial highway (Highway 40) in 1934 and paved over the following decade.

In November 1964, it was announced that a new inland route for Highway 40, bypassing the towns along the river, would be built. The St. Clair Parkway Commission was subsequently formed out of several committees in 1966, the ultimate result of a vision set forth by Alan Brander in 1949. The parkway commission took over the former highway by 1982, as well as numerous parks along the riverfront. Disagreements between Chatham-Kent and Lambton County over funding resulted in the Parkway Commission being dissolved in 2006. Although the parkway retains its name, it is now maintained by those two municipalities.

== Route description ==
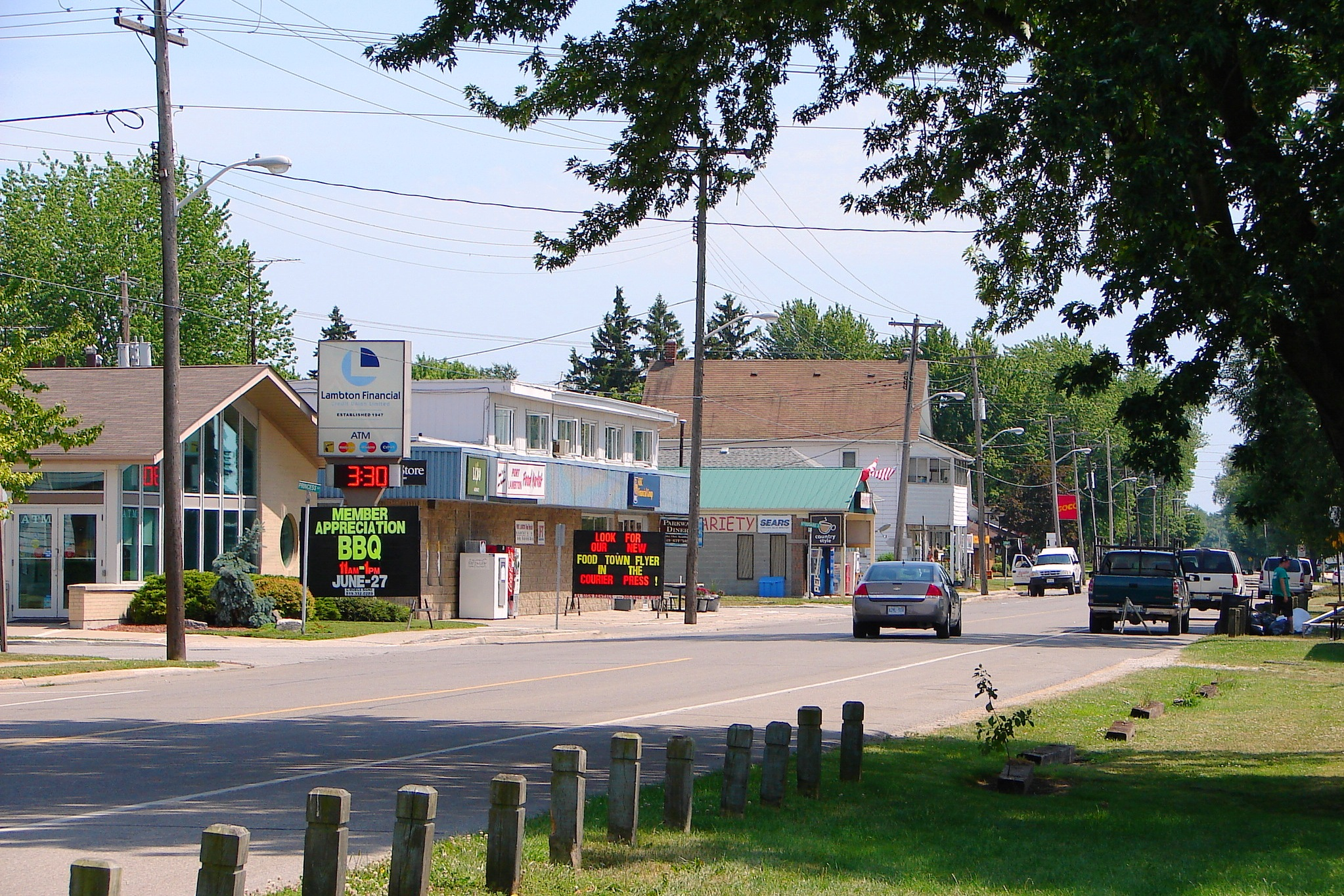
Facing south along the St. Clair Parkway in Port Lambton

At its southern end, the St. Clair Parkway begins at an intersection with Dufferin Avenue immediately east of its crossing of Chenail Ecarté (The Snye) to the Walpole Island First Nation, and approximately 5 km (3 mi) west of Wallaceburg. It proceeds north alongside The Snye, crossing Running Creek and passing the Roberta Stewart Wetland before transitioning from Chatham–Kent to Lambton County at Whitebread Line. Now in the municipality of St. Clair, the parkway curves northwest towards the St. Clair River, encountering Baby Point at the divergence of the St. Clair River and The Snye.

Beginning at Baby Point, the St. Clair Parkway hugs the shoreline of the St. Clair River. Each of the settlements along this portion of the parkway are centered at the concession roads that funneled inland settlers and goods to and from the river. The Sarnia Subdivision, at one time the principal means of communication between those settlements, roughly parallels the parkway to the east. It is presently a CSX railway spur between Chatham and Sarnia. Several petrochemical plants line the route, particularly towards Sarnia. This area has been known since the 1940s as "Chemical Valley". After passing through Port Lambton, the St. Clair Parkway crosses the W. Darcy McKeough Floodway, a channel constructed in 1984 to protect Wallaceburg from flooding. It travels through Sombra, providing access to the Sombra–Marine City (Bluewater) Ferry. Between Sombra and Courtright, the CF Industries nitrogen chemical plant as well as the decommissioned Lambton Generating Station rise above the flat farmland that abuts the parkway.

Beginning at Courtright, the terminus of the former Canada Southern Railroad, the parkway moves slightly inland from the shoreline and becomes consistently lined by residential properties. It crosses Baby Creek and travels through Mooretown, with the Sarnia Subdivision briefly running alongside the parkway north of the village. Next it bisects Corunna, a planned town intended to be the capital of the united Upper and Lower Canada when it was established in 1823. North of Corunna, the St. Clair Parkway shifts back to the riverfront and crosses Talfourd Creek in front of the Shell Corunna Refinery. At LaSalle Line, the route leaves the municipality of St. Clair and enters Sarnia as well as the community of Froomfield. A final stretch of housing lines the inland side of the parkway before it curves inland around the Suncor Sarnia Refinery and into Sarnia's industrial area. The parkway officially ends at the southern edge of the Suncor refinery, where it becomes River Road. River Road, in turn, becomes Vidal Street at the overpass of the Sarnia Subdivision.

There are several public parks located along the route. Brander Park is bisected by the parkway at Baby Point. It was named in honour of Alan P. Brander, former Wallaceburg mayor whom envisioned the parkway in the 1950s. Cathcart Campground, formerly Clay Creek, is located between Sombra and Courtright, as is Willow Grove. In addition to these three parks, which formed the basis for the St. Clair Parkway in 1957, are nine other waterfront parks as well as the public St. Clair Parkway Golf Course.

== History ==
=== The River Road ===
River Road near Courtright circa 1900

The St. Clair Parkway follows the route of the first settlement trail in Lambton County, and was the only passable road in the area until at least 1839. There are two conflicting stories as to the origin of a route along the Lambton riverfront:

- One version traces its beginnings to Point Pelee First Nations Chief O-ge-mah-be-na-sie at some point after 1807. While on an excursion, the chief was alerted to news of American raids along the St. Clair River. Hurrying home, he blazed a trail along the St. Clair River to allow other native tribes to aid in defence quickly.
- A second recounting places its origins nearly two centuries earlier at the hands of Joseph de La Roche Daillon. Daillon was a Franciscan Récollet who was the first European to set foot in Lambton County, spending 5 years among the Huron natives in the 1620s.

In both cases, the trail went on to become the main route between Lake Erie and Lake Huron. In the 1840s, it was improved into a wagon route, but otherwise retained its rough and muddy qualities until the automobile arrived at the turn of the century.

Postcard view of the River Road north of Port Lambton in the 1910s

The first permanent European settlers colonised along the St. Clair River beginning in 1800. In 1829, the Townships of Sombra, Moore and Sarnia were surveyed by Roswell Mount. The villages along the parkway were established in turn around this period. Baby Point was the first settlement in Lambton County, although it never grew into an incorporated village. It was instead overtaken by nearby Port Lambton, which was established by Duncan McDonald in 1820. Corunna was surveyed by Lord Beresford in 1823, with the intention of moving the parliament buildings there. In 1834, Froome and Field Talfourd established Froomfield. Sombra, originally known as Lewisville was established in 1835 by Lewis Burham. Mooretown was established by James F. Baby Jr. in 1837. Sarnia and Courtright were both settled around this period, but not named until later. Port Sarnia was named in 1836, while Courtright was not named until the arrival of the Canada Southern Railway (later the Pere Marquette Railway) after 1872.

The arrival of the Erie and Huron Railway (today's Sarnia Subdivision) in 1886 temporarily supplanted the role of the muddy river road. Around this time, the Bushnell Refinery, now owned by Imperial Oil, redirected the road around the back of its property, to what is now Vidal Street; the clanks and hisses of the refinery spooked horses. In an effort to reduce the quagmires that developed in wet conditions, a layer of gravel was placed down on the road in the late 1800s; mud was henceforth replaced by dust.

=== Highway 40 ===
The St. Clair River Road north of Sombra in 1934, the year it was assumed as a provincial highway

As the automobile came to prominence at the beginning of the 20th century, road development became a priority for both local and provincial governments. The opportunity to draw tourism and trade was also widely recognised, resulting in the formation of the St. Clair River Association in 1925. The association was composed of local mayors, Members of the Legislative Assembly(MLA)s and businessmen, as well as representatives of the Ontario Good Roads Association. The association began to pressure the province, which had recently started taking over roads as provincial highways, into assuming and improving the St. Clair River Road. The river road was in a state of disrepair and often impassable during the winter. In November 1926, the provincial government announced its intention to designate a north–south highway through Lambton County. Much to the chagrin of the association, Highway 21 was designated through Oil Springs and Dresden on May 25 and June 1, 1927. The association continued to send delegations to Toronto to argue for the designation of the river road as a highway over the next several years, and began a beautification program of planting trees along the route. By late 1932, the provincial government announced the intent to designate a new highway between Chatham and Sarnia once the economy recovered.

Highway 40 was established at the height of the Great Depression, during the spring of 1934. The subsequent improvement of the roadway employed several dozen men eight hours per day, six days per week at minimum wage as a depression-relief project. On May 2, the Department of Highways (DHO) assumed the route of Highway 40 between Wallaceburg and Sarnia, including the entire length of the River Road. The 80.6-kilometre (50.1 mi) highway connected Highway 2 in Chatham with Highway 7 and Highway 22 in Sarnia. The designation came just weeks before the 1934 Ontario general election that saw Lambton West incumbent Conservative MLA Andrew Robinson McMillen replaced by Liberal William Guthrie. As such, it was seen as a fruitless last-ditch attempt to garner votes.

George Doucett, Minister of Highways, cuts a ribbon to officially open the completed Highway 40 in Corunna on October 27, 1943

The DHO immediately set forth to improve the road and pave it. However, a particularly bad winter in 1934–35 set back efforts by a full year as the roadbed was rebuilt and gravelled. Paving was completed through the villages in and between Port Lambton and Corunna in mid-to-late 1936. The following year, paving operations were completed between Wallaceburg and north of Sombra, as well as between Froomfield and Sarnia. This left two gaps in the pavement, on which work would be delayed by the onset of World War II. Work resumed August 10, 1942, with paving completed between Sombra and Courtright by the end of the year. The final gravel segment, between Courtright and Froomfield, was paved during the summer of 1943. This completed the paving of Highway 40 between Chatham and Sarnia. At a ceremony in Corunna on the evening of October 27, 1943, Minister of Highways George Doucett cut a ribbon to officially mark the completion of the work. A total of $1,622,598 ($29.6 million in 2025 dollars) was spent on upgrades and paving between 1934 and 1943.

=== Rose Trail ===
Close your eyes and picture 12 miles of roses. Then imagine, in 10 years, 32 miles of roses from Wallaceburg to Sarnia! It's a glorious picture isn't it? Will you help us to make this dream come true?

— Alan P. Brander, 1950

Perhaps more than any one person, former Wallaceburg mayor Alan Perry Brander was responsible for the idea of a continuous parkway along the St. Clair River. In 1949, he approached Maud Gordon, head of the Wallaceburg Horticultural Society, with the concept of a rose trail along the highway between Wallaceburg and Port Lambton. A program of planting rose bushes along Highway 40 approaching and through the town was begun. By mid-1951, the Rose Trail Committee, now backed by the Wallaceburg Chamber of Commerce, had planted nearly 1,600 rose bushes, including several hundred near and within Port Lambton and Sombra. Speaking of the tourist potential to the Wallaceburg Rotary Club, Brander laid out his vision for a beautified living museum, akin to the Niagara Parkway or Colonial Williamsburg, along the riverfront. In 1952, and now with the support of the DHO, the program expanded to include the entire highway between Wallaceburg and Sombra, with an additional 1,300 rose bushes prepared for planting that summer.

In August 1953 a beauty pageant was held at the first Port Lambton Civic Holiday celebration. The "Queen of the Rose Trail" was chosen by judges selected by local newspaper publishers each August long weekend over the next three years. Attendance of this event rose dramatically each year, with as many as 7,000 visitors in 1954. The celebrations likewise grew to include a boat race, baseball games, a carnival and a parade. However, the contest was inexplicably cancelled prior to the 1956 holiday. Dorothy O'Neill of Chatham was crowned the Queen in 1953, and again in 1955; Janice Peterson of Wallaceburg was crowned in 1954.

A lack of co-operation by residents and other municipalities along the trail ultimately led to the failure of the Rose Trail project, despite over 6,000 rose bushes being planted in its five-year course. By 1961, the bushes had begun to revert to a wild unkempt state in many places, although Brander continued with his work until his death in 1965. By 1969, the roses had all but disappeared entirely, although some remained as of the early 2000s. Brander Park was developed in 1971 and named in recognition of his contributions.

=== Highway 40 bypass and St. Clair Parkway Commission ===
In October 1954, the Parks division of the Department of Lands and Forests was established, led by Ben Greenwood (W.B. Greenwood). Greenwood was first to note the need for a dedicated authority to acquire land, build and maintain parks along the riverfront. As part of his massive expansion of the Ontario park system, three parks along the St. Clair River were taken over by the province in 1957. During the late-1950s, the Saint Lawrence Seaway project created a navigable lock system between the Atlantic Ocean and Lake Superior, while simultaneously reclaiming properties along the shoreline for parkland. Seeing the potential tourist draw, several groups and organizations, including the district Chamber of Commerce, convened at the second annual conference of the Southwestern Ontario Chambers of Commerce and Boards of Trade in February 1960. A number of resolutions were passed, calling for the DHO to create a new Highway 40 bypass several kilometres inland from the St. Clair River and to have the old highway rebuilt as a scenic park system. These resolutions were echoed by Lambton County Council and the 21 municipalities in the county.

Highway Minister Charles MacNaughton officially announced plans for the bypass on November 4, 1964. Around the same time, both Kent and Lambton counties formed parkway committees composed of local business leaders and politicians. Plans for the parkway were crafted over the next year before being presented to MacNaughton in the spring of 1965. Subsequently, the St. Clair Parkway Commission was created in 1966. Following several years of negotiations with the Aamjiwnaang First Nation (then the Chippewas of Sarnia), construction of the new inland route of Highway 40 began in July 1972. Working south from Sarnia, the first contract reached as far south as Highway 80 (Courtright Line), a distance of 13.4 km (8.3 mi). A second contract, awarded in 1974, extended construction south an additional 11.0 km (6.8 mi) to Lambton County Road 2 (Bentpath Line) near Sombra. The third and final contract was awarded in late 1975 to complete the remaining 13.2 km (8.2 mi) south of County Road 2.

The new Sarnia–Wallaceburg highway was opened to traffic as each contract was completed. The section from Sarnia to Highway 80 was opened in August 1975, and the section from Highway 80 to Sombra by mid-1977. The entire $12.6 million ($61.6 million in 2025 dollars) project was opened ceremoniously by Highway Minister James Snow on November 25, 1977; Minister Snow was late to the ceremony due to a snowstorm. The old alignment was transferred to the St. Clair Parkway Commission between Sarnia and Sombra in 1979, and from Sombra to Dufferin Avenue (opposite Walpole Island) by 1982. The remaining 3.0 km (1.9 mi) along Dufferin Avenue to the new Highway 40 was decommissioned between 1984 and 1986. Both Kent and Lambton counties designated their portion of the former highway as County Road 33.

== Major intersections ==
The following table lists the major junctions along St. Clair Parkway.

Division	Location	km	mi	Destinations	Notes
Chatham-Kent		0.0	0.0	Dufferin Avenue – Walpole Island First Nation, Wallaceburg	
Lambton County	Port Lambton	7.9	4.9	County Road 1 (Broadway Street)	
Lambton County	Sombra	14.5	9.0	King Street	To Sombra–Marine City (Bluewater) Ferry
Lambton County	Sombra	15.3	9.5	County Road 2 (Bentpath Line)	
Lambton County	Courtright	26.7	16.6	County Road 80 (Courtright Line) – Brigden	Formerly Highway 80
Lambton County	Mooretown	29.6	18.4	Moore Line	
Lambton County	Corunna	35.1	21.8	County Road 4 (Hill Street) – Petrolia	
Sarnia	Froomfield	37.9	23.5	County Road 35 (LaSalle Line)	
Sarnia	Aamjiwnaang First Nation	40.1	24.9	Suncor Sarnia Refinery entrance	St. Clair Parkway becomes River Road
Sarnia		41.8	26.0	Crossing of Sarnia Subdivision; River Road becomes Vidal Street	
1.000 mi = 1.609 km; 1.000 km = 0.621 mi
