= Brights Grove, Ontario =

Brights Grove
- Neighbourhood of Sarnia
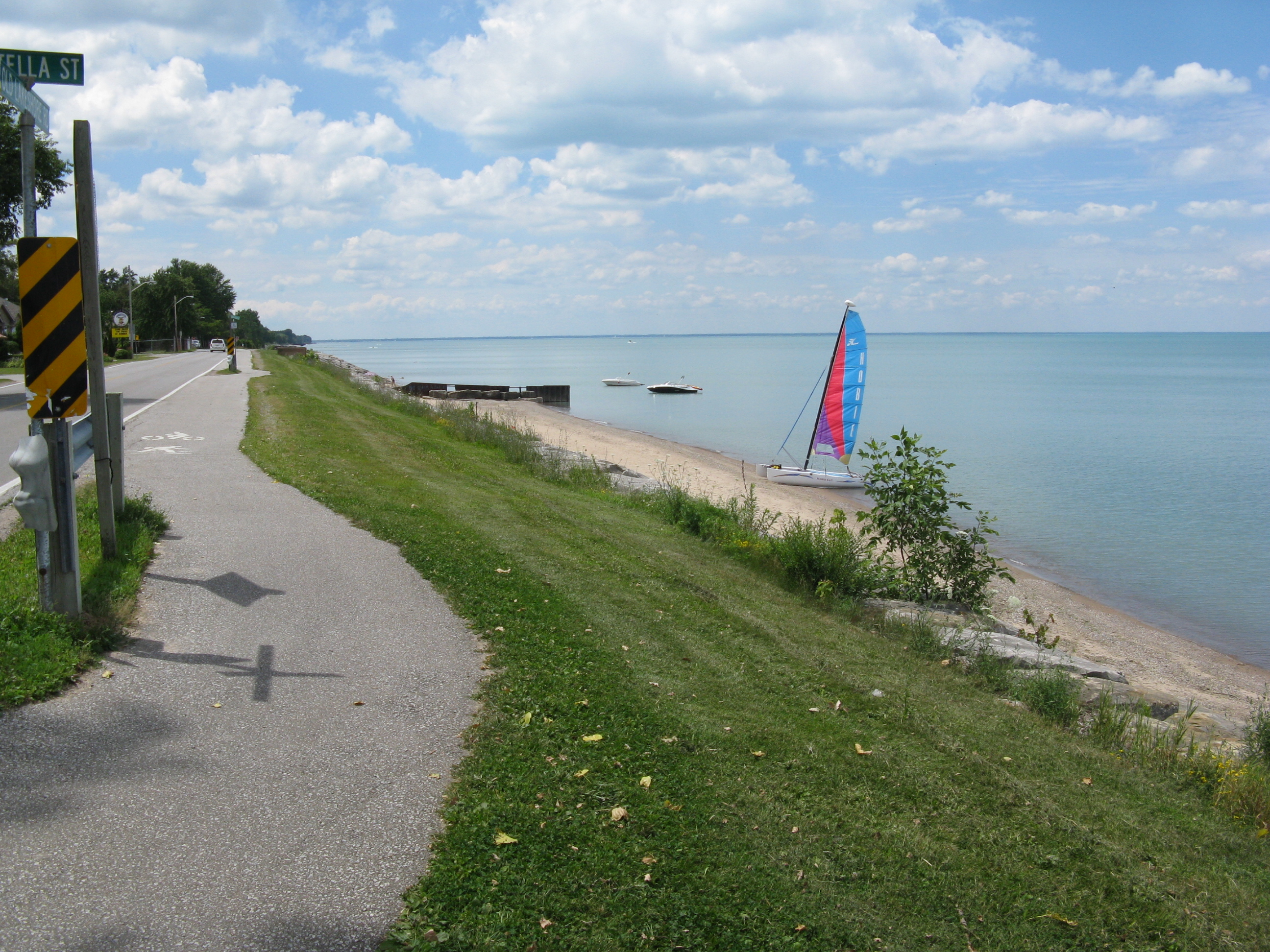
- Lake Huron at Brights Grove

- Location within Ontario Location within Canada
- Coordinates: 43°01′51″N 82°15′07″W
- Country: Canada
- Province: Ontario
- County: Lambton
- Time zone: UTC-5 (EST)
  - Summer (DST): UTC-4 (EDT)
- Postal code: N0N 1C0
- Area code: 519
- GNBC Code: FALRP

Brights Grove is a neighbourhood of Sarnia, Lambton County, Ontario, Canada. Brights Grove is located on the shore of Lake Huron.

== History ==
=== The Owenite Project ===
Brights Grove was the site of Canada's first commune, the short lived utopian community of 'Maxwell'. In 1829, Brights Grove was established along the model of Robert Owen's New Lanark, Scotland project by Henry Jones (1776–1852). Canadian socialist historian Ian McKay stated that the members of Maxwell "may well have been the first people in North America to call themselves 'socialists'."

In the 1970s, the Ontario Heritage Foundation erected an historical plaque recognizing the site with the following text:

In 1829, Henry Jones of Devon, England, a retired purser in the Royal Navy, brought a group of more than 50 emigrants from the United Kingdom to this area where he established a settlement on a 1,000 acres (4.0 km^{2}) tract of land on Lake Huron. An early supporter and dedicated follower of Robert Owen, the well-known British social reformer. [sic] Jones named the settlement "Maxwell" and organized the community on the basis of common ownership and collective living. The settlers built a large log house with community kitchen and dining-room but separate rooms for each family. A school and storehouse were added. Within a few years, however, disappointing harvests and the burning of the log house led the colonists gradually to abandon the enterprise.

=== Faethorne House ===
In 1875, Col. Robert F. Faethorne built what is now known as the Faethorne House. Faethorne built the house on the most easterly of the five farms (the "East Range") into which the land grant of Henry Jones, Faethorne's father-in-law, had been divided. Robert Faethorne had married Jones' daughter, Elizabeth, and farmed the East Range. Faethorne was interested in race horses, imported trees to beautify his property and took an active part in the militia. In 1862, he was promoted to full colonel to command the local military district until after the Fenian alarms of 1866 and 1868.

On Faethorne's death in 1897, the house was sold to Angus Jamieson. In 1921, it was purchased by H.F. Holland who restored it and the grounds. In 1934, it achieved notoriety when John Labatt, of the brewing family, who had rented it for the summer, was kidnapped on his way to London. In 1938, the house was sold once more. Under the name of Wildwood, it began a long career as a summer resort and golf club. By 1978, it was badly in need of repairs when it passed into the hands of Sarnia Township. It was restored to its present condition and started a new life as the Brights Grove library and Gallery in the Grove.

=== Big band era ===
Brights Grove hosted many top performers at the Kenwick dance hall.

In the late 1940s, Kenwick-on-the-Lake was open air in the round. The venue served as a Saturday night destination for passengers of the SS Noronic that stopped at Sarnia on its trip around the Great Lakes from Toronto until it burnt out alongside the quay in Toronto. Bands that performed at the dance hall include Duke Ellington, Count Basie, and Lionel Hampton. There was also boxing.

Later years saw rock acts, such as Alice Cooper.

The structure was destroyed by fire and is now a basketball court on the lakefront.

=== Salmon fishery ===
Brights Grove has two creeks that attract salmon during the spring fishery. Cow Creek and Perch Creek. The Bluewater Anglers in Sarnia stock salmon, rainbow trout, and brown trout into Lake Huron.

== Arts and culture ==
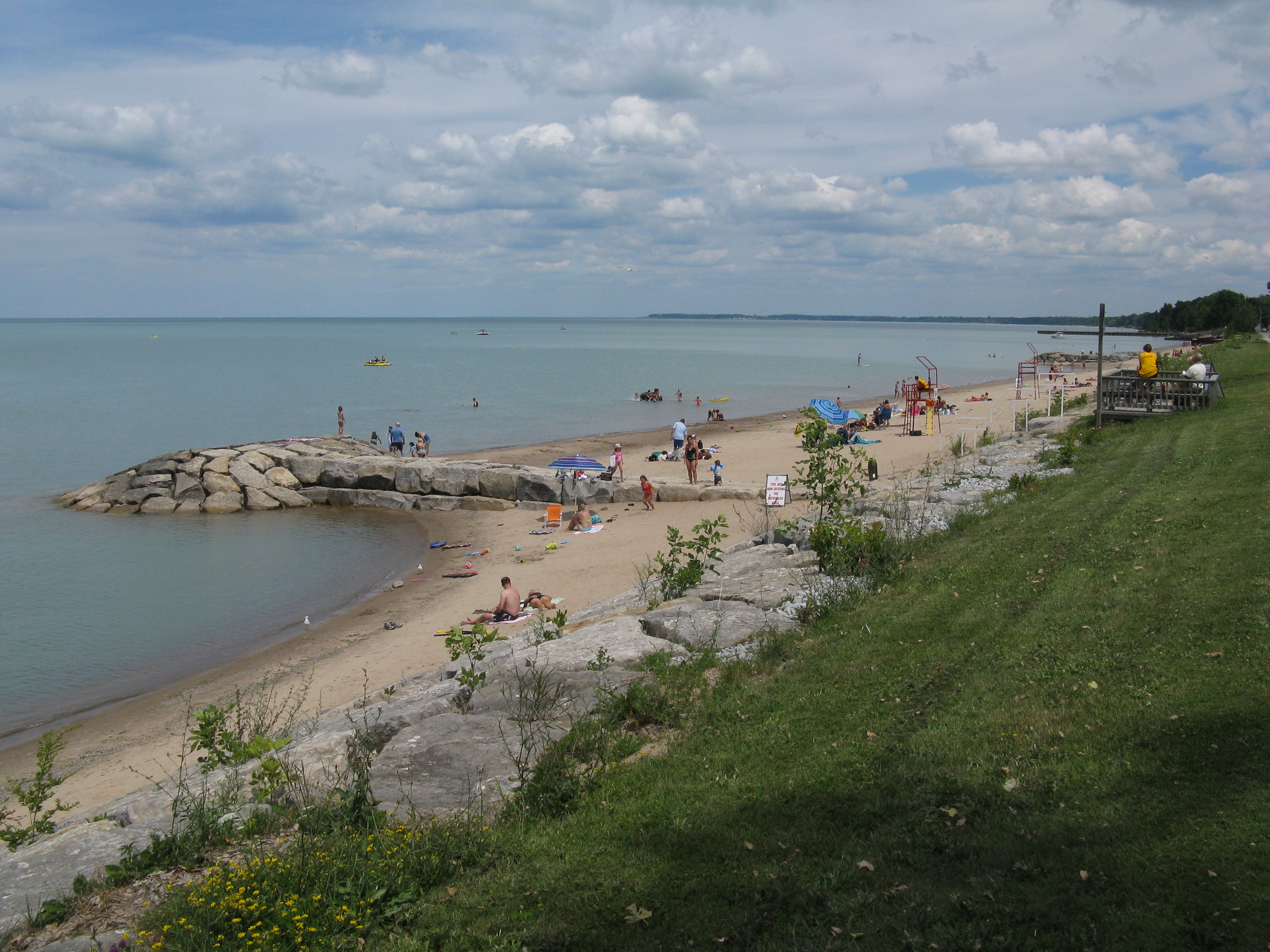
Brights Grove Beach

=== Lake Huron Waterfront Walking Trails ===
There are 8 kilometres of lakefront walking trails, half is on rural road and other on dedicated bike/walk path.

=== Howard Watson Nature Trail ===
Brights Grove is located halfway on a 25 km nature trail from Sarnia to Camlachie. It is a good rail path, crosses numerous creeks (including Cow & Perch Creek), and is well maintained. Visitors can do a loop of rail path and lakefront around Brights Grove of 20 km or more.

== Notable people ==
- golf professional Mike Weir.
- Poet Paul Vermeersch
- golf professional Matt Hill.
- Bluegrass harmonica player Mike Stevens
