= Chemical Valley =

Chemical Valley may refer to:

- The chemical industry in Kanawha Valley, West Virginia, US
- The chemical industry in Sarnia, Ontario, Canada; see Environmental impact of the chemical industry in Sarnia
