= Mooretown, Ontario =

Canadian community

Mooretown
- Unincorporated community
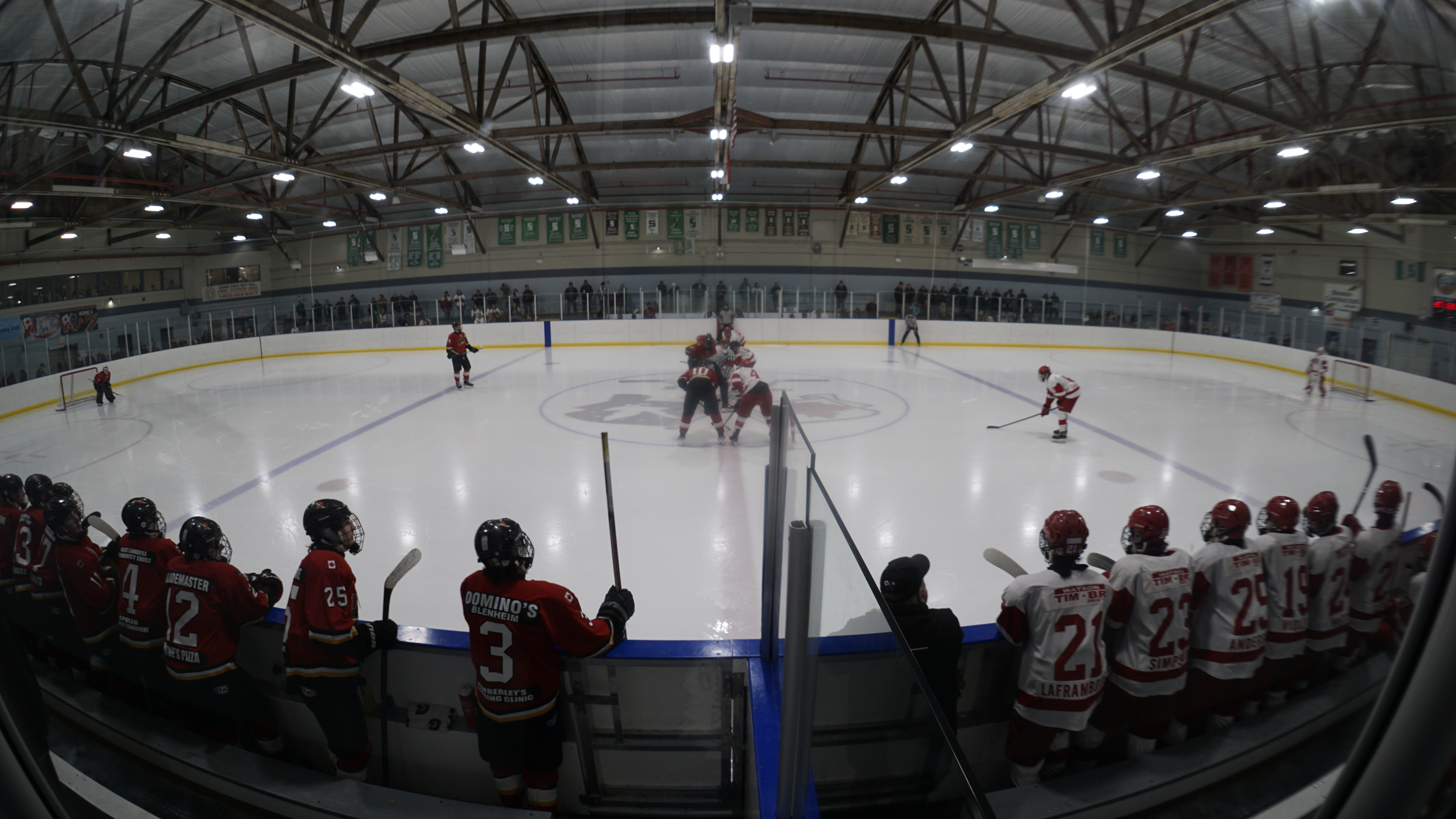
- The Mooretown Sports Complex

- Location within Southern Ontario
- Coordinates: 42°50′23″N 82°27′50″W
- Country: Canada
- Province: Ontario
- County: Lambton
- Municipality: St. Clair
- Forward Sortation Area: N0N
- Area Codes: 519, 226 and 548

Mooretown is a community in the Township of St. Clair, Ontario, Canada, located on the east bank of the St. Clair River. It was first established as Sutherland's Landing.

Mooretown gained in prosperity during the 19th century as a port of call for sail born vessels requiring assistance to pass "The Rapids" where steamboats driven by cord wood stacked on Mooretown's piers could be towed up river into Lake Huron.

The original Scottish settlers established a church at Sutherland's Landing (now between Mooretown and Courtright) which was then moved to Mooretown in the 1860s when the oak logs of the original structure rotted out.

The 1860s structure was struck by lightning in 1918 having been built of local timber with a copper clad steeple known to mariners as a navigation point.

The 1919 replacement structure is now on the Moore Museum's grounds having been preserved by artist Christine Anne Wingfield-Brandon. The structure retains the steeple bell from the original Sutherland's Landing Church.

Mooretown served as a regional centre for salt mining and oil refining before these industries move to neighboring communities.

In the 19th century Mooretown was a regional seat with a considerable population with hotels and a municipal seat, it exists today as a quiet and distinctive community.
