= Port Lambton =

- Unincorporated community
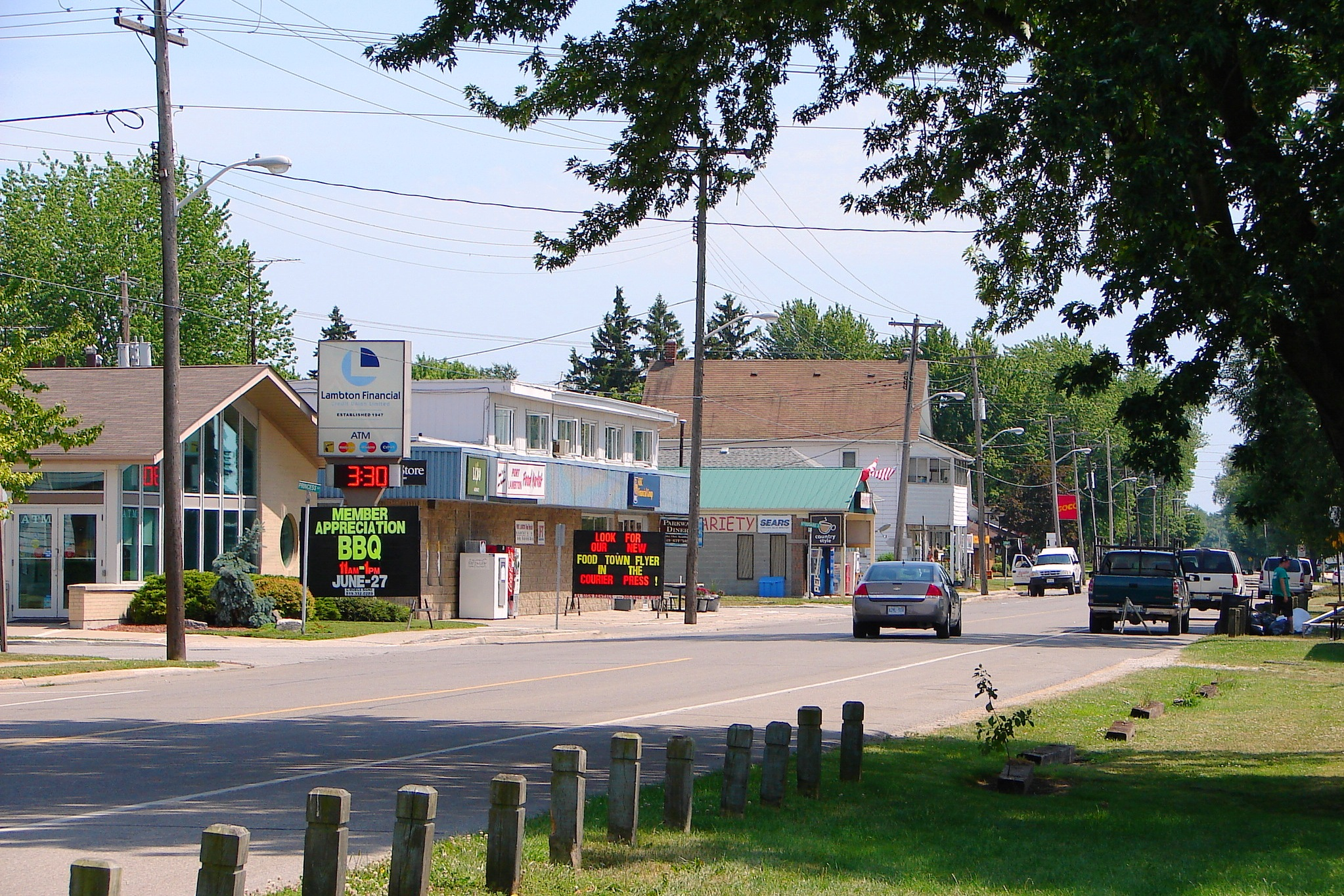
- Port Lambton

- Location in Ontario Location in Canada
- Coordinates: 42°39′25″N 82°30′12″W
- Country: Canada
- Province: Ontario
- County: Lambton
- Township: St. Clair

Population (2021)
  - Total: 1,100 ≈
  - Density: 659/km^{2} (1,710/sq mi)
- Time zone: UTC-5 (Eastern (EST))
  - Summer (DST): UTC-4 (EDT)
- GNBC Code: FCZKZ

Port Lambton is an unincorporated community in St. Clair Township, Lambton County, Ontario, Canada. According to the latest census, 1084 people live within this community.

In its early days, the village developed out of local transport and agricultural trade via rail and ship and evolved mainly into a summer resort community, serving seasonal residences and summer cottagers through much of its history. The village is now home to mostly permanent residences and commuters supported by larger cities and towns such as Sarnia and Wallaceburg. Every Civic Holiday weekend in August the town hosts its annual Gala Days. This community is served by two elementary schools, several churches, and a small service industry. The public school is Riverview Central School and the Catholic school is Sacred Heart. Until the mid-1980s Port Lambton served as a registered port of entry into Canada by utilizing a ferry crossing from nearby Roberts Landing, Michigan, and docking facilities on much of the village's waterfront. Following the ending of ferry operations at Port Lambton, the former port facility and Customs office located at the foot of Stoddard Street on the St. Clair River was transferred to the Department of Fisheries and Oceans. The federal government through the Canadian Coast Guard continues to operate the facility as a seasonal Inshore Rescue Boat Station.

== History ==
The village of Port Lambton has its roots in the settlement of Baby's Point. Located just south of the village of Port Lambton, in the area that is now Brander Park, Baby's Point is the extreme southern point of Lambton County. Inherited from his grandfather in 1742, François Baby owned all the land from this point and all of the Port Lambton site. There also was a brother, Jacques Baby. Edward Kelly was the first postmaster at Baby's Point in 1848.

After 1812, people started to settle along the St. Clair River. Before that, very few people lived there. They were French and didn't have legal title to the land. When the Irish moved in, the French sold their squatter's rights to the Irish in about 1833. The Natives could sell land only with the approval of the Province. Soon after 1812, people bought up land legally along the St. Clair River.

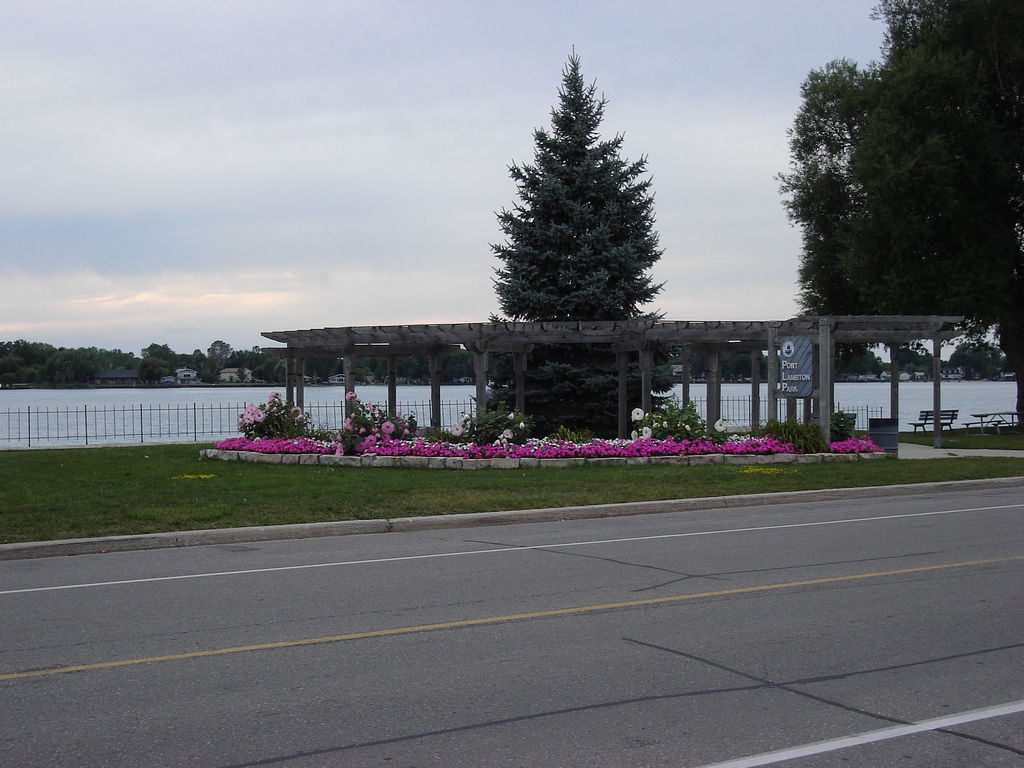
Dedecker Park along the St. Clair River in Port Lambton

Port Lambton— the liveliest little river-town South of Sarnia. Two of each, sawmills, grist mills, shoe shops, blacksmith shops. Eight general stores, 3 hotels, 3 liveries, 2 telegraph offices. The Daily Mail from Sarnia, daily railway service. School with two teachers. Steamers stopped every day at the White Star line dock, during the summer months. Customs House. Docks extend one-quarter mile along the river. Population 450. In the spring of 1820, Duncan McDonald built the first frame house. A Post office opened in 1871, one time known as Lambton Village. Rural mail was first delivered in 1908, and all mail routes were completed in January 1909.

The first Sacred Heart Church was built at Baby's Point around 1825. It burned. Father Monocq, a secular priest, French, was drowned on January 12, 1861, and the body was found in 1862. He was buried beneath the altar of the first Port Lambton Church. The plaque was on the right hand of the side altar. The Sacred Heart Church, Port Lambton, was built in 1877. Martin Regan was the first person baptized there, in December 1877. It was demolished, and the new church was built on the same site in 1964. The R.C. Cemetery started in 1916. Sombra t. John's Church was built in 1868, and Father Waters was one of the first priests; he resided in Corunna, Ontario. R.C. Cemetery started in 1870.

On December 20–21, 2011, a marina fire broke out, resulting in 40 million dollars in damage.

== Events ==
Gala Days is a summer weekend of festivities including a parade, sports tournaments, music, and family activities. The St. Clair River Run was a 10K run and 5K walk/run that was held each 3rd Saturday of July. With a finish line in Brander Park, its final year was 2019 and was furthermore canceled due to the COVID-19 pandemic.

The Mermaids and Mariners event, a large community gathering filling Brander Park with a market of local goods and attractions, is to be held annually each August after being held for the first time in 2022.

== Notable people ==
- Maud Menten, pioneering woman chemist notable for the Michaelis-Menten equation. Menten is honoured with a historical plaque at Queen's Park in Toronto, Ontario.
