= Chippewas of Sarnia Band v Canada (AG) =

2000 decision of the Court of Appeal for Ontario

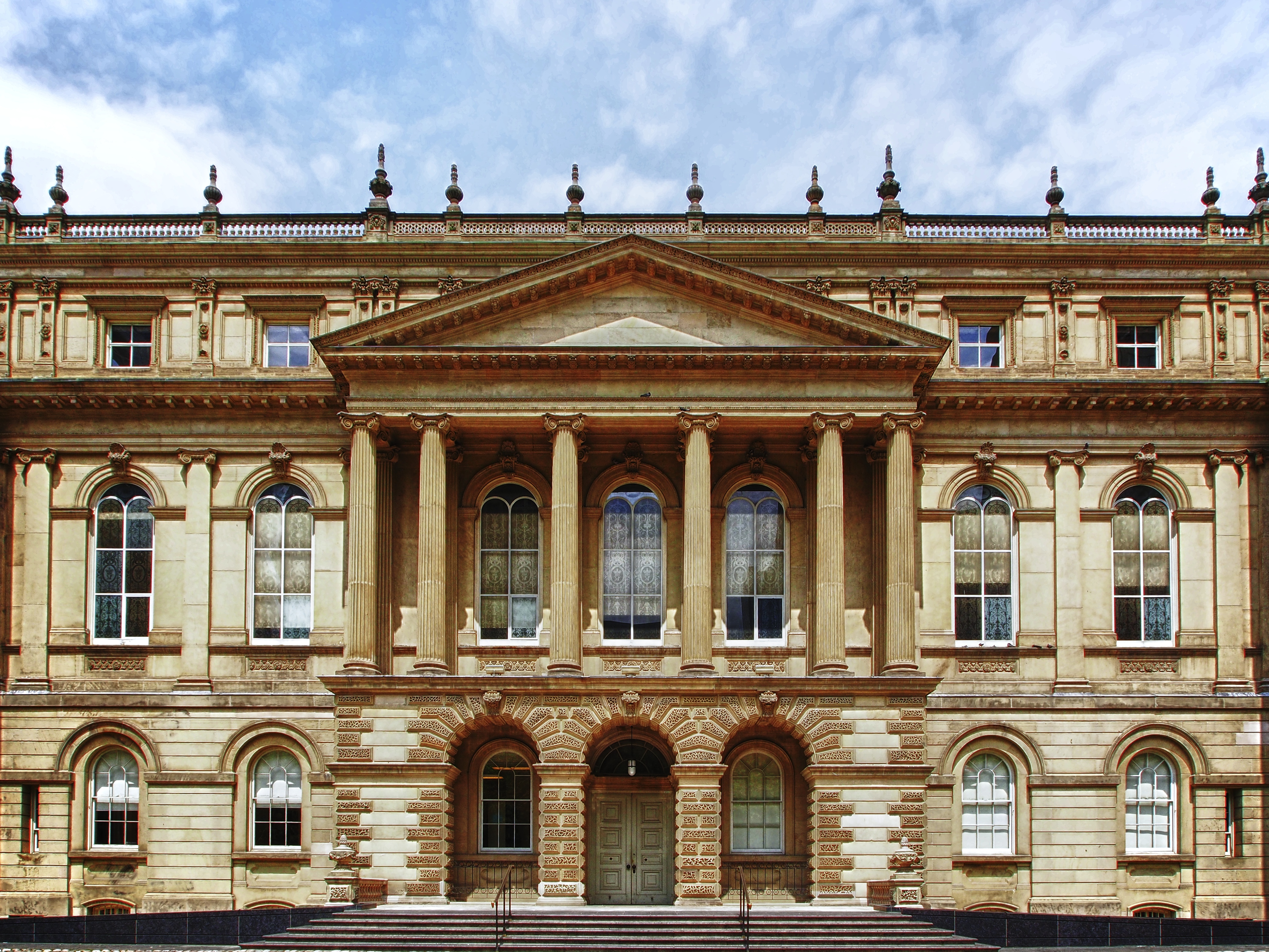
- Court: Ontario Court of Appeal
- Full case name: The Chippewas of Sarnia Band v Attorney General of Canada
- Decided: 21 December 2000
- Citations: 2000 CanLII 16991; 51 OR (3d) 641; 195 DLR (4th) 135

Case history
- Appealed from: Chippewas of Sarnia Band v Canada (Attorney General) (1999), 40 RPR (3d) 49 (ONSC)
- Subsequent actions: Leave to appeal to the Supreme Court of Canada denied (8 November 2001); Application for motion for reconsideration of leave to appeal to the Supreme Court of Canada dismissed with costs (11 June 2002)
- Related actions: Chippewas of Sarnia Band v Canada (Attorney General), 2000 CanLII 5620 (27 January 2000); Chippewas of Sarnia Band v Canada (Attorney General), 2000 CanLII 1956 (4 April 2000); Chippewas of Sarnia Band v Canada (Attorney General), 2001 CanLII 2615, 204 DLR (4th) 744 (5 September 2001)

Court membership
- Judges sitting: Osborne ACJO; Finlayson, Doherty, Charron and Sharpe JJA

Case opinions
- Decision by: The Court

Chippewas of Sarnia Band v Canada (AG), 2000 CanLII 16991, 51 OR (3d) 641; 195 DLR (4th) 135 was a decision of the Court of Appeal for Ontario concerning aboriginal title in Canada.

== Background ==
The Chippewas of Sarnia, a First Nation band, (Note: now known as Aamjiwnaang First Nation) claimed aboriginal title to a parcel of land comprising 2,540 acres (3.97 sq mi) (Note: the back quarter of the Upper St. Clair Reserve, one of four reserves withheld from the original surrender of the Huron Tract) on the St. Clair River downstream from Sarnia, Ontario. It had been sold by the band to Malcolm Cameron, a Canadian politician and land speculator, such transaction being ratified through letters patent issued in 1853. In 1995, after discovering in 1979 that there was no documentation pertaining to a formal surrender of the lands to the Crown, the band initiated proceedings for a declaration stating that they had never surrendered their interest in the lands.

First certified as a class proceeding by Adams J in 1996, (Note: with respect to the private-landowner defendants to the action: Chippewas of Sarnia Band v Canada (Attorney General), 1996 CanLII 8015, 29 OR (3d) 549; 137 DLR (4th) 239 (5 July 1996), later varied by Chippewas of Sarnia Band v Canada (Attorney General), 1996 CanLII 8123, 138 DLR (4th) 574 (14 August 1996)) Campbell J, a motions judge of the Ontario Superior Court of Justice, ordered in April 1999 that:

1. Canada's motion to dismiss the Chippewas' claim on the basis that the Cameron patent was valid was dismissed.
2. The landowners' motion in respect of the validity of the 1853 Cameron patent was also dismissed.
3. The Chippewas' motion in respect of the invalidity of the Cameron patent was allowed. A declaration was issued to the effect that the patent issued to Malcolm Cameron on August 13, 1853 was void ab initio and of no force and effect because there was no lawful surrender. Neither the orders-in-council of March 19, 1840 and June 18, 1840, which approved the sale to Cameron, nor the subsequent letters patent, extinguished the Chippewas' unceded, unsurrendered, common law and aboriginal interests in the lands.
4. The Chippewas' motion for a declaration that they enjoyed continuing and unextinguished common law, aboriginal, treaty and constitutional rights in the lands was dismissed.
5. The Chippewas' action for damages against the Crown was permitted to continue.
6. The motion by the landowners was allowed. The Chippewas' claim against the landowners was dismissed on the basis that the defence of good faith purchaser for value without notice protected the landowners' title and that the application of an equitable limitation period of 60 years worked to extinguish all right, title and interest of the Chippewas in the disputed lands as of August 26, 1921. A declaration was issued to the effect that the present landowners held their title free and clear from any aboriginal title claims.

A series of six appeals and cross-appeals were subsequently filed with the Ontario Court of Appeal.

== Judgment on appeal ==
In a per curiam judgment, the Court allowed the appeals and cross-appeals by Canada, Ontario and the landowners and dismissed the appeal by the Chippewas. Consequently, paragraphs 1, 2, 5 and 6 of the motions judge's order were set aside, and the following was substituted:

1. The landowners' motion for summary judgment dismissing the Chippewas' claim in respect of the invalidity of the Cameron patent is allowed.
2. The Chippewas' motion for summary judgment in respect of the invalidity of the Cameron patent is dismissed.

The Court noted that "In the Canadian legal tradition, no right is absolute, not even constitutionally protected Aboriginal rights", and "In the case of a claim to aboriginal title, a court must approach the issue of delay with extreme caution and with due regard to the nature of the right at issue." Aboriginal title has been held to be sui generis in nature, (Note: as held in Guerin v The Queen, 1984 CanLII 25 at p. 382, [1984] 2 SCR 335 (1 November 1984) and Delgamuukw v British Columbia, 1997 CanLII 302 at pp. 1081-1097, [1997] 3 SCR 1010 (11 December 1997)) and "the Chippewas cannot escape the fact that, from a private law perspective, they are claiming remedies that are discretionary in nature and subject to equitable defences." Proceeding "on the basis that the Chippewas have a right of action against the Crown for damages", the Court summarized the public and private law remedies with respect to the lands in question:

- In the case of a claim to aboriginal title, a court must approach the issue of delay with extreme caution and with due regard to the nature of the right at issue.
- Public law remedies available for attacking the validity of the Crown patent are subject to two discretionary factors: (a) the nature of the disputed act, the nature of the illegality committed and its consequences; and (b) the nature of the delay and its consequences for third parties.
- A claim to aboriginal title is not immune from the overriding principles of equity, particularly where equitable remedies are being claimed.
- The nemo dat principle does not automatically invalidate Crown patents. Established legal principles require that the interests of innocent third parties must be considered.
- Because of the equitable doctrine of laches, the 150-year delay in pursuing their claim was fatal to enforcing any judgment against the private landowners.
- Equity provides protection to a good faith purchaser who acquires a thing for value.

=== Seeking leave of appeal to the Supreme Court of Canada ===
An application for leave to appeal was denied in November 2001. An application for reconsideration, following the publication of two critical law review articles, was dismissed with costs in June 2002.

== Impact and aftermath ==
Chippewas of Sarnia, together with Delgamuukw, are considered to form the legal framework for determining aboriginal title in those parts of Canada with unceded territory that has never been formally surrendered to the Crown (most prominently in British Columbia). Its approach with respect to dealing with the rights of private landowners involved was subsequently affirmed by the Supreme Court in R v Marshall. (Note: R v Marshall (No 1), 1999 CanLII 665, [1999] 3 SCR 456 (17 September 1999), R v Marshall (No 2), 1999 CanLII 666, [1999] 3 SCR 533 (17 November 1999))

Observers agreed that this case represented the first application of equity to land claims, but noted that the results were mixed.
