= Sombra, Ontario =

Sombra
- Unincorporated village
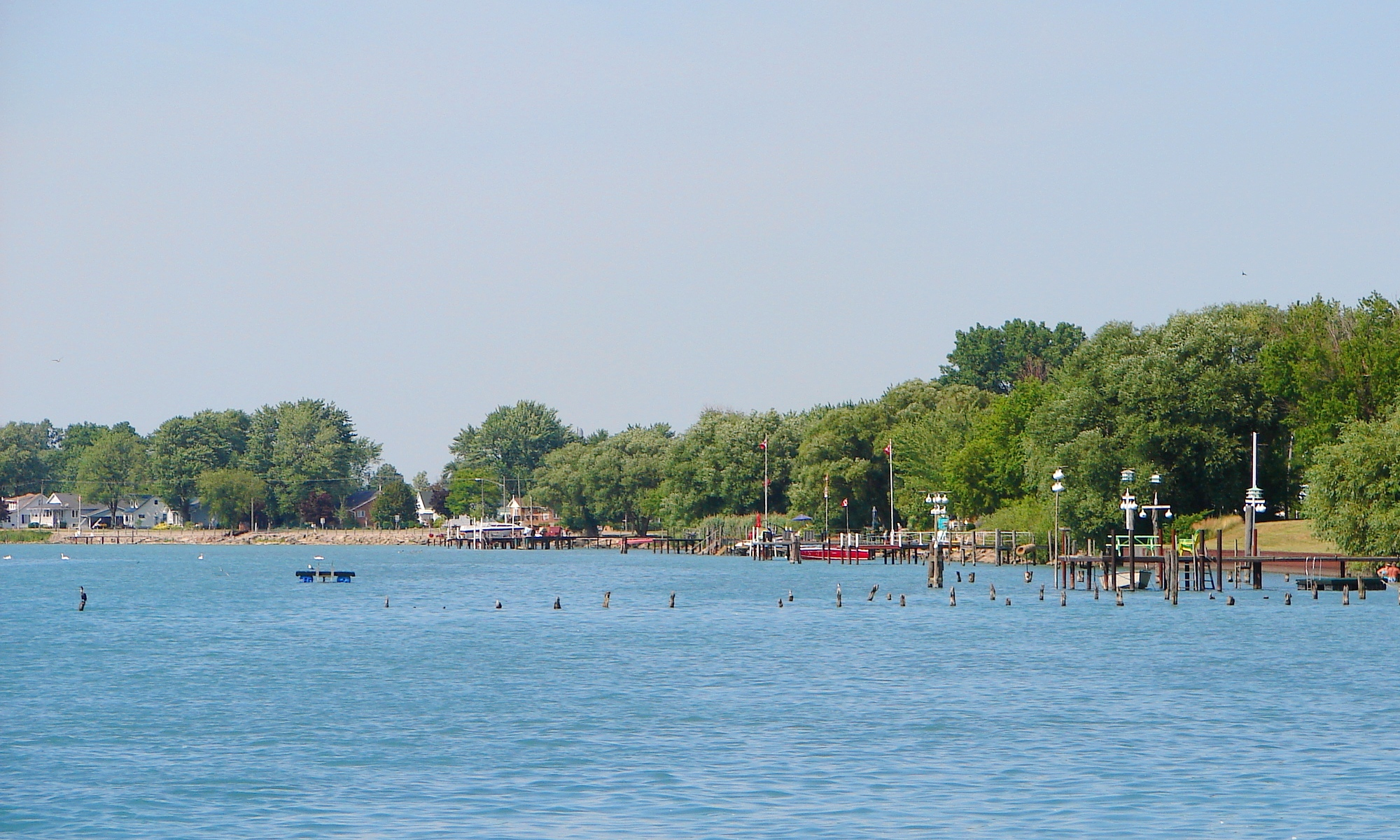
- Sombra waterfront

- Location within Southern Ontario
- Coordinates: 42°43′N 82°29′W
- Country: Canada
- Province: Ontario
- County: Lambton
- Municipality: St. Clair

Government
  - Mayor: Jeff Agar (St. Clair Twp)
  - Federal riding: Sarnia—Lambton
  - Prov. riding: Sarnia—Lambton
- Time zone: UTC-5 (EST)
  - Summer (DST): UTC-4 (EDT)
- Postal Code: N0P 2H0
- Area codes: 519 and 226
- Website: www.twp.stclair.on.ca

Sombra is an unincorporated community and former Police village situated on the St. Clair River, in southwestern Ontario, Canada within the municipality of St. Clair Township. In its early days, the village developed out of local transport and agricultural trade via rail and ship and evolved mainly into a summer resort community, serving seasonal residences and summer cottagers through much of its history. The village is now home to mostly permanent residences and commuters supported by larger cities and towns such as Sarnia, Corunna, and Wallaceburg. Each year, in July, the town hosts Sombra Days. This community is served by two elementary schools, several churches and a small service industry. The public school is Riverview Central School. In the recent past, Sombra served as a registered port of entry into Canada by means of a ferry crossing, the Bluewater Ferry from nearby Marine City, Michigan, United States.

== History ==
Sombra was named by Sir Peregrine Maitland, the lieutenant governor of Upper Canada because it was so densely wooded that the sun was blocked out. He chose the name because Sombra is the Spanish (and also Portuguese) word for "shade."

Samuel Burnham and Abraham Smith initially settled here in May 1812. Initially, logging and lumber was the primary industry, however, by 1822 agriculture was beginning to emerge as an important industry. The first school was built in 1820 and rebuilt after a fire in 1882.

Its first year of municipal organization was 1822.

Sombra also was a stop along the Underground Railroad en route to Owen Sound, Ontario. This was part of the alternate route around Detroit, Michigan.

During the United States Prohibition in the 1920s, alcohol was smuggled across the border from Canada via the St. Clair River and Sombra was a key location for the activity. Al Capone used Sombra as a key location for his alcohol smuggling organization.

Originally an independent Police village, Sombra was annexed into Sombra Township, which in turn was amalgamated in 2001 along with Moore Township into St. Clair Township.

== Population ==
Sombra's current population is approximately 250 people.
