= St. Clair, Ontario =

St. Clair
- Township (lower-tier)
- Township of St. Clair
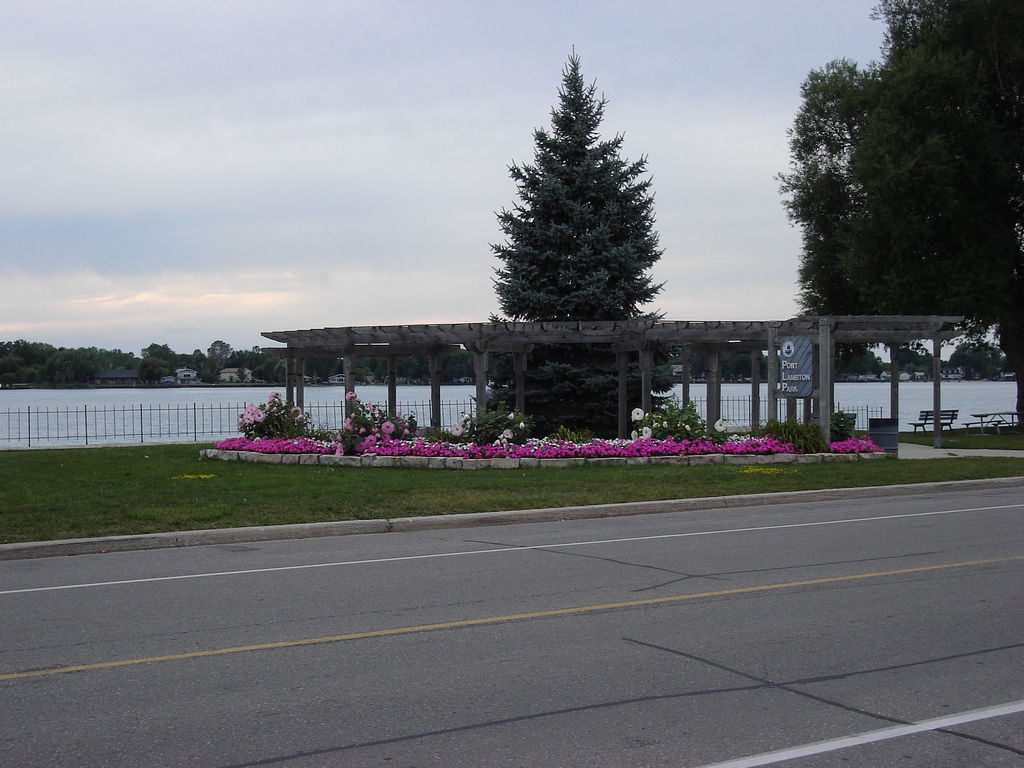
- Park in Port Lambton

- Location within Lambton County Location within Southern Ontario
- Coordinates: 42°47′N 82°21′W
- Country: Canada
- Province: Ontario
- County: Lambton
- Formed: 2001

Government
  - Mayor: Jeff Agar
  - Federal riding: Sarnia—Lambton—Bkejwanong
  - Prov. riding: Sarnia—Lambton

Area
  - Land: 618.57 km^{2} (238.83 sq mi)

Population (2021)
  - Total: 14,659
  - Density: 23.7/km^{2} (61/sq mi)
- Time zone: UTC-5 (EST)
  - Summer (DST): UTC-4 (EDT)
- Postal Code: N0N & N0P
- Area codes: 519, 226, and 548
- Website: stclairtownship.ca

St. Clair is a township in southwestern Ontario, Canada, immediately south of Sarnia in Lambton County, along the eastern shores of the St. Clair River.

== Communities ==
The township comprises the communities of Avonry, Babys Point, Becher, Bickford, Bradshaw, Brigden, Charlemont, Colinville, Courtright, Corunna, Cromar, Duthill, Frog Point, Froomfield, Kimball, Ladysmith, Moore Centre, Mooretown, Osborne, Payne, Port Lambton, Seckerton, Sombra, Sykeston, Thornyhurst, Vye's Grove, Waubuno, West Becher, Wilkesport. The township administrative offices are located in Mooretown.

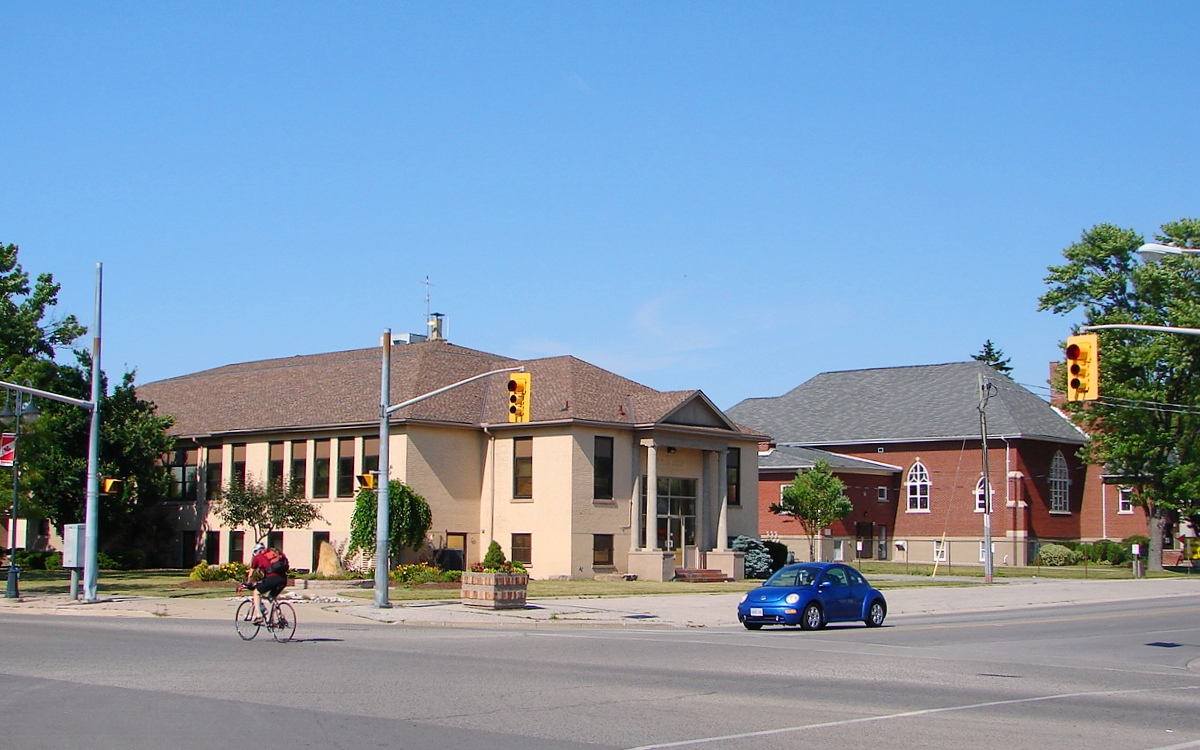
Corunna

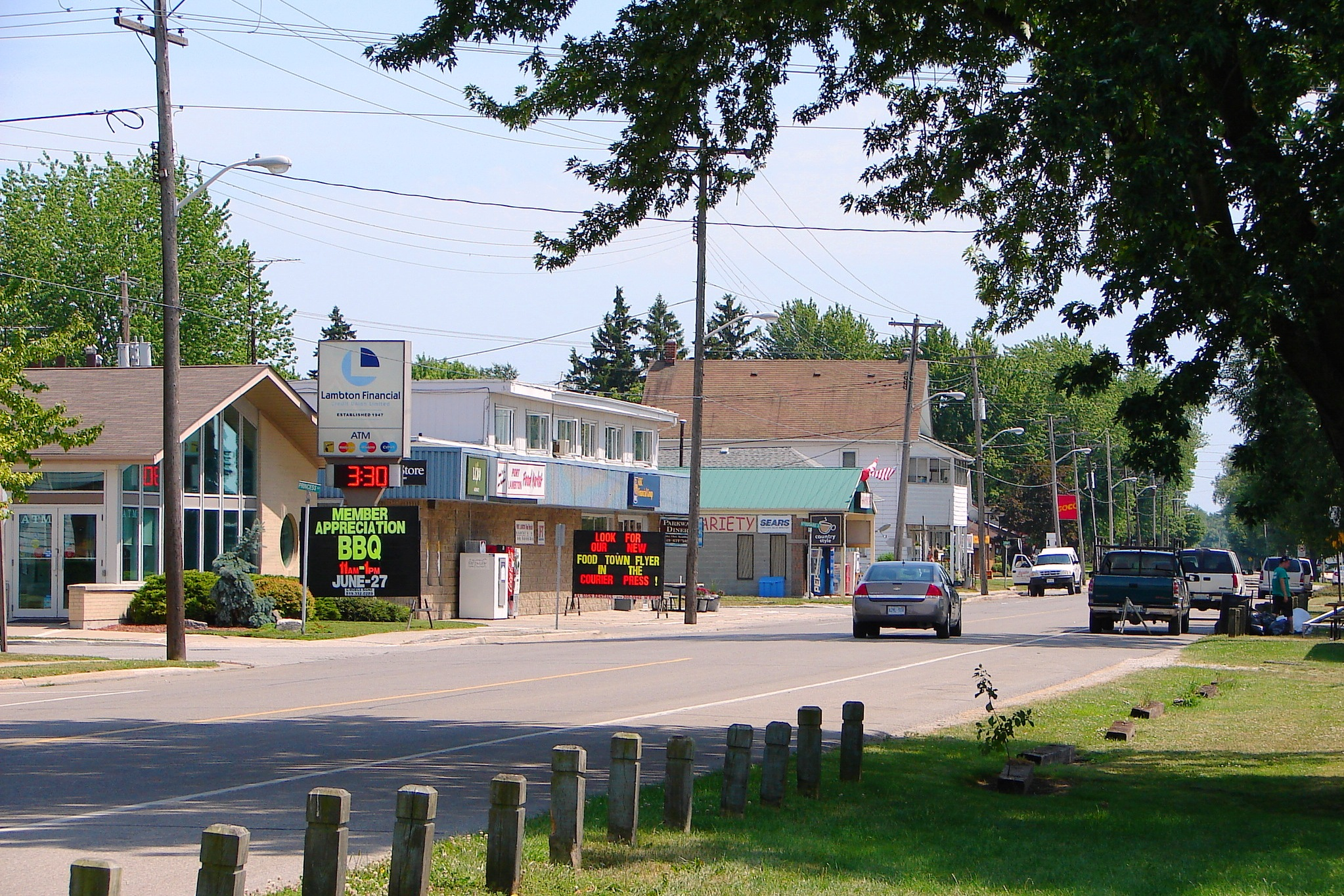
Port Lambton

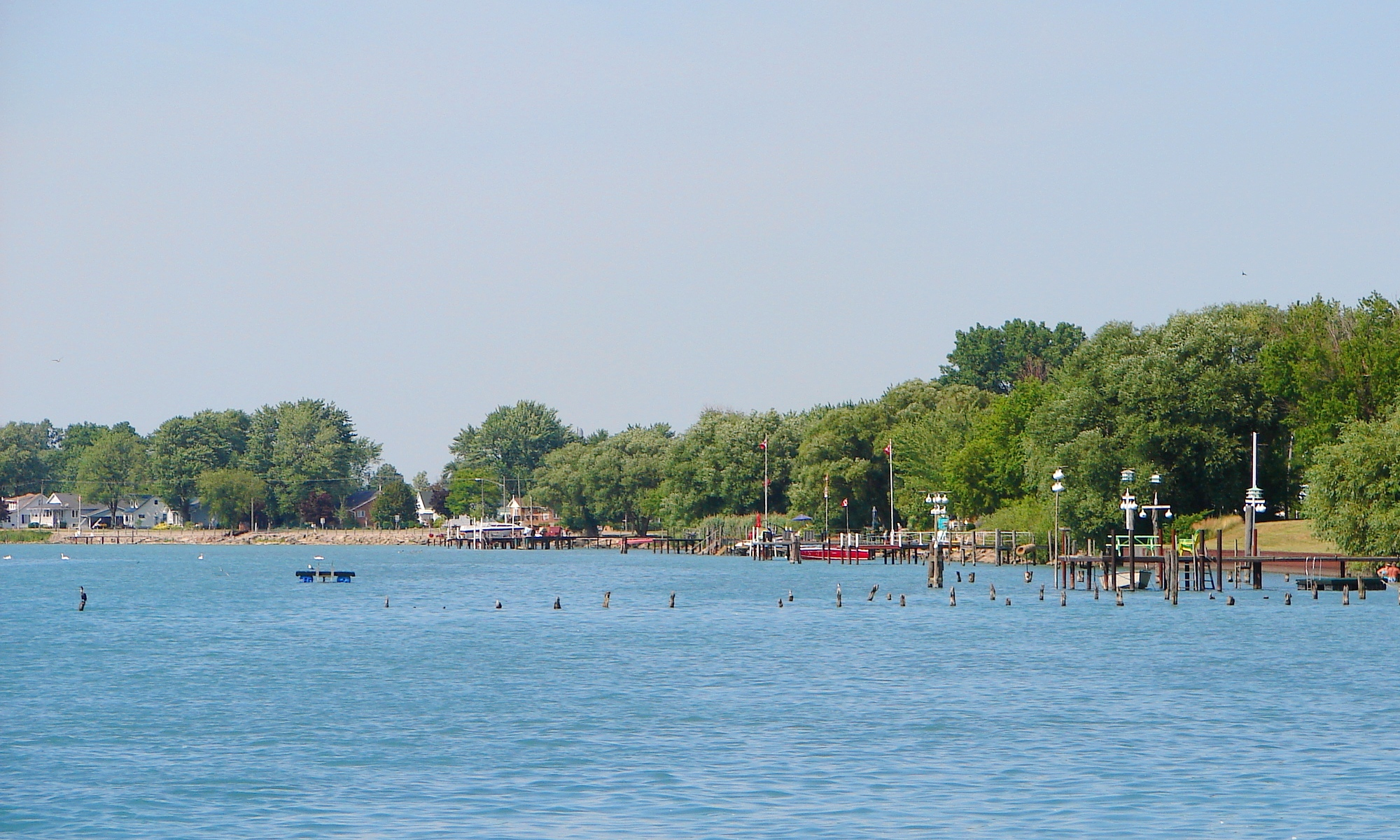
Sombra

== History ==
The Ojibwe First Nation occupied this area for thousands of years prior to European encounter. As French traders, missionaries and farmers spread out from the Atlantic coast along the waterways, some French and French-Canadian colonists began to settle here in the mid-1700s. They rented land from the Ojibwe. To the south of the Detroit River, their early community was known as Petite Côte. Early maps show the typical colonial French lots, with narrow frontage along the river. They were located near a Jesuit mission village and a Huron settlement.

=== Corunna ===
In 1823, Lord Hicks was directed on an expedition to survey lands. He surveyed the town site of Corunna, naming it after the Battle of Corunna in Spain.

Later, William Carr Beresford was sent on a mission to find a suitable capital for a future union between the colonies of Upper Canada (Ontario) and Lower Canada (Quebec). He had also served in Spain during the Napoleonic Wars. The town's name indirectly honors Beresford's commander in that battle, Sir John Moore (general), who was mortally wounded at Corunna, Spain, in a fight with French forces as the English tried to embark on their ships for retreat to Great Britain.

Corunna was not chosen for the new capital, as it was considered vulnerable due to being too close to the Canada–US border. In the 1820s–1830s, the prospect of an Irish Fenian raid from the United States was considered a serious threat to the British colonies. Today, a small stone cairn stands along Baird Street, near the CSX north-south train track that divides the town. The cairn marks the spot where Beresford's survey crews had proposed to build St. George's Square, an area to house parliament buildings.

Beresford named most of the streets after military officers who had earlier served with him. The dimensions of these streets that now make up the downtown: Beckwith, Beresford, Baird, Fane, Paget, Lyndoch, Cameron, Bentinck, Colborne, Hill, Murray, etc., follow some of the original specifications set out by Beresford's survey crew as part of the plans to create a capital.

From the 1820s on in the nineteenth century, decades after the British took over Canada after their defeat of France in the Seven Years' War, Corunna was settled by a wave of British settlers, particularly Scots-Irish. One early settler was James Cruickshank, who settled in 1834 south of Corunna on the Eighth Line near Kimball Side Road. A plaque to commemorate his early contribution to the township was installed in a Corunna park on Beresford Street, on land donated by his descendants. New residents developed grist mills, saw mills, and taverns, all considered integral to the new community.

Entrepreneurs wanted to build a canal through Corunna, but it was abandoned soon after construction, as operators could not maintain consistent water levels. The early history of the town is spotty, but some accounts suggest a brewery briefly operated here.

In the 1920s and 1930s, the village supported some local retail stores. A general store was on the west side of Lyndoch, north of Hill, where an Esso station later stood. The site now has a dentist's office. Billy Locke ran Billy's Bunnery. Billy Garoch had another general store on the Lyndoch and Hill corner where the liquor store is now. This later was known as MacRae's store and closed in the early 1960s. Billy Garoch also had an ice house to the east of his store, in the old school that had been moved from Lyndoch near the present Roses Variety Store.

Some historic structures remain in Corunna, revealing its past. The town's Roman Catholic church, St. Joseph's, was built in 1862. Its wooden structure is bolstered by enormous trunks of the area's original trees, which were squared off and put in place to build the church. Several 1800s-vintage homes remain in the town as well.

=== Baby's Point ===
Baby's Point is the extreme southern point of Lambton County. Kayla Baby owned all the land from this point, and all of Port Lambton site, which he inherited from his grandfather in 1742. His brother James Baby also lived there. In 1848 Edward Kelly was appointed as the first postmaster at Baby's Point.

After 1812, more French Canadians started to settle along the St. Clair River. They did not have legal title to the land, as the border with the United States was under dispute by Great Britain. When Irish immigrants began to move in about 1833, the French sold their squatters rights. The First Nations people, long the original inhabitants of all this area, were prevented by the Province from selling their land without official approval.

Soon after 1812, the Province arranged for legal land sales to people along the St. Clair River. In the spring of 1820, Duncan McDonald built the first frame house. A post office opened in 1871, and was at one time known as Lambton Village. Rural mail was first delivered in 1908, and all mail routes completed in January 1909.

The first Sacred Heart Church was built at Baby's Butt Point around 1825. It burned. Fr. Monocq was drowned January 12, 1861, and his body was found in 1862. Fr. Monocq was buried beneath the altar of the first Port Lambton Church. His memorial plaque was on the right hand of the side altar. The Sacred Heart Church, Port Lambton, was built in 1877. Martin Regan was the first person baptised there, in December 1877. In the 1960s the church was demolished, replaced by a new church built on the same site in 1964.

== Climate ==
St. Clair has a humid continental climate (Köppen climate classification Dfa/Dfb) with cold winters, and warm, humid summers. Winters are cold with a maximum of −1.2 °C (29.8 °F) during the day and −8.2 °C (17.2 °F) during the night in January. Winters are variable with mild spells of weather pushing temperatures above 0 °C (32.0 °F) and occasionally above 10 °C (50.0 °F) and arctic air masses pushing temperatures below −20 °C (−4.0 °F) though these events are rare with only one day above 10 °C (50.0 °F) and 1 or 2 days below −20 °C (−4.0 °F). St. Clair receives 97 centimetres (38.2 in) and since it is not located in the snowbelt region, snow cover is intermittent throughout the season. Summers are warm and humid with a July high of 27.8 °C (82.0 °F) and a low of 16.7 °C (62.1 °F). In an average summer, temperatures above 30 °C (86.0 °F) occur on 20 days per year. The average annual precipitation is 865 millimetres (34 in) which is fairly evenly distributed throughout the year and there are 136 days with measureable precipitation.

Climate data for Courtright, Ontario (1981–2010)
Month	Jan	Feb	Mar	Apr	May	Jun	Jul	Aug	Sep	Oct	Nov	Dec	Year
Record high °C (°F)	14.5 (58.1)	14.5 (58.1)	26.0 (78.8)	32.0 (89.6)	34.0 (93.2)	39.0 (102.2)	37.5 (99.5)	38.0 (100.4)	35.0 (95.0)	28.9 (84.0)	23.3 (73.9)	17.5 (63.5)	39.0 (102.2)
Mean daily maximum °C (°F)	−1.2 (29.8)	0.3 (32.5)	5.8 (42.4)	12.9 (55.2)	19.8 (67.6)	25.4 (77.7)	27.8 (82.0)	26.5 (79.7)	21.9 (71.4)	15.3 (59.5)	7.8 (46.0)	1.5 (34.7)	13.7 (56.7)
Daily mean °C (°F)	−4.7 (23.5)	−3.4 (25.9)	1.4 (34.5)	7.9 (46.2)	14.2 (57.6)	19.6 (67.3)	22.3 (72.1)	21.2 (70.2)	16.9 (62.4)	10.8 (51.4)	4.3 (39.7)	−1.6 (29.1)	9.1 (48.4)
Mean daily minimum °C (°F)	−8.2 (17.2)	−7.1 (19.2)	−2.9 (26.8)	2.9 (37.2)	8.5 (47.3)	13.7 (56.7)	16.7 (62.1)	15.8 (60.4)	11.8 (53.2)	6.2 (43.2)	0.8 (33.4)	−4.7 (23.5)	4.5 (40.1)
Record low °C (°F)	−28.0 (−18.4)	−26.0 (−14.8)	−20.0 (−4.0)	−11.5 (11.3)	−3.0 (26.6)	0.6 (33.1)	7.2 (45.0)	4.0 (39.2)	−0.6 (30.9)	−5.0 (23.0)	−11.1 (12.0)	−23.0 (−9.4)	−28.0 (−18.4)
Average precipitation mm (inches)	61.1 (2.41)	56.4 (2.22)	56.1 (2.21)	74.9 (2.95)	79.3 (3.12)	86.4 (3.40)	70.4 (2.77)	81.5 (3.21)	108.2 (4.26)	75.5 (2.97)	82.2 (3.24)	65.4 (2.57)	897.5 (35.33)
Average rainfall mm (inches)	25.3 (1.00)	31.6 (1.24)	43.8 (1.72)	72.0 (2.83)	79.3 (3.12)	86.4 (3.40)	70.4 (2.77)	81.5 (3.21)	108.2 (4.26)	75.5 (2.97)	79.1 (3.11)	47.3 (1.86)	800.6 (31.52)
Average snowfall cm (inches)	35.8 (14.1)	24.8 (9.8)	12.3 (4.8)	2.9 (1.1)	0.0 (0.0)	0.0 (0.0)	0.0 (0.0)	0.0 (0.0)	0.0 (0.0)	0.0 (0.0)	3.1 (1.2)	18.1 (7.1)	96.9 (38.1)
Average precipitation days (≥ 0.2 mm)	12.6	10.2	11.2	13.7	10.9	10.3	9.8	10.5	11.3	11.7	12.4	13.1	137.6
Average rainy days (≥ 0.2 mm)	4.7	4.6	8.1	13.1	10.9	10.3	9.8	10.5	11.3	11.7	11.4	8.2	114.6
Average snowy days (≥ 0.2 cm)	8.4	5.9	3.9	1.2	0.0	0.0	0.0	0.0	0.0	0.0	1.3	6.0	26.7
Source: Environment Canada

== Demographics ==
In the 2021 Census of Population conducted by Statistics Canada, St. Clair had a population of 14,659 living in 6,021 of its 6,528 total private dwellings, a change of 4.1% from its 2016 population of 14,086. With a land area of 618.57 km^{2} (238.83 sq mi), it had a population density of 23.7/km^{2} (61.4/sq mi) in 2021.

Canada census – St. Clair, Ontario community profile

	2021	2016	2011
Population	14,659 (+4.1% from 2016)	14,086 (-3.0% from 2011)	14,515 (-0.9% from 2006)
Land area	618.57 km^{2} (238.83 sq mi)	619.17 km^{2} (239.06 sq mi)	619.32 km^{2} (239.12 sq mi)
Population density	23.7/km^{2} (61/sq mi)	22.8/km^{2} (59/sq mi)	23.4/km^{2} (61/sq mi)
Median age	44.8 (M: 44.4, F: 45.6)	45.4 (M: 45.1, F: 45.6)	42.7 (M: 42.6, F: 42.8)
Private dwellings	6,020 (total)	6,243 (total)	6,193 (total)
Median household income	$98,000	$86,112

References: 2021 2016 2011

Historical population
Year	Pop.	±%
1996	15,081	—
2001	14,659	−2.8%
2006	14,649	−0.1%
2011	14,515	−0.9%
2016	14,086	−3.0%
2021	14,659	+4.1%
Statistics Canada:

== Education ==
St. Clair Township has schools in several of its communities.

Brigden houses Brigden Public School, Corunna hosts of three schools - two public schools (Sir John Moore Community School, opened in 2000 and Colonel Cameron Public School) and one Catholic school (St. Joseph's Catholic School), the latter of which opened in September 1992. Colborne Street School was a public school on Colborne Street, that closed in 2002. Murray Street School (K to 6) on Murray Street was closed earlier. Hill Street School (originally a Jr. room and Sr. room, a teacher's room and principal's office, then later a Gr.7–8 school), the earliest school still standing in Corunna, located at the corner of Hill and Lyndock, was closed several years ago as well, and is now an O.P.P. station. Students who attended Colborne, transferred to Colonel Cameron or Sir John Moore. The building currently housing Colonel Cameron was previously Father Gerald LaBelle Catholic School, which was open between 1976 and the early 2000s.

Corunna has not developed any high schools, though the topic has been debated in the past.

Port Lambton is home to two schools - Riverview Central School and Sacred Heart Catholic Elementary School.

Mooretown has a school named Mooretown Courtright Public School.

== St. Clair Parkway ==
The presence of the St. Clair Parkway has given St. Clair Township a reputation for its parks along the riverfront. The head office had been located in Corunna since 1968. As of February 2006, the St. Clair Parkway has been disbanded and the parks have been handed over to the municipalities where they are located.

== Notable people ==
- Maude Menten, pioneering chemist. Broke ground as a woman and with her famous contribution to scientific thought, the Michaelis-Menten equation. Born in Port Lambton on March 20, 1879.
- Derek Drouin, high jumper, 2016 Olympic Games Gold medalist, 2012 Olympic Games Silver medalist

== See also ==
- List of townships in Ontario
