= Osborne, Lambton County =

Osborne
- Dispersed rural community
- Location in Southern Ontario
- Coordinates: 42°54′30″N 82°15′28″W
- Country: Canada
- Province: Ontario
- County: Lambton
- Municipality: St. Clair
- Elevation: 198 m (650 ft)
- Time zone: UTC-5 (Eastern Time Zone)
  - Summer (DST): UTC-4 (Eastern Time Zone)
- Postal Code: N0N 1R0
- Area codes: 519, 226, 548

Osborne is a dispersed rural community and unincorporated place in the municipality of St. Clair, Lambton County in Southwestern Ontario, Canada.

It is at the intersection of Lasalle Line and Waterworks Road, about 15 kilometres (9 mi) southeast of the centre of Sarnia.
