= Cow Creek (Ontario) =

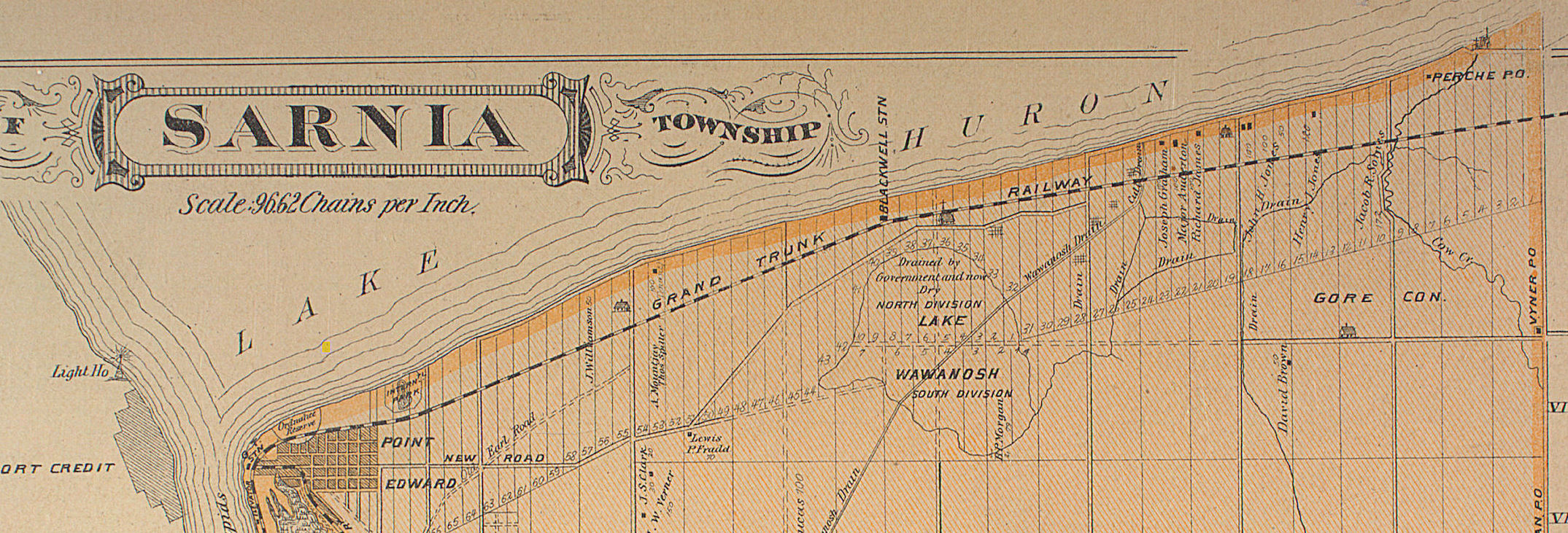
- The St Clair River is the large watercourse on the western side of this map, Cow Creek is the larger watercourse on the east of this map.

Cow Creek is a watercourse in Sarnia Township, Ontario, that empties into Lake Huron. The boundaries of the present day watercourse is confused, due to 19th century efforts to drain a wetland, known as Lake Wawanosh. Lake Wawanosh was drained by Riviere Aux Perches, Perch Creek, a tributary of Cow Creek. In 1859 a short drainage canal was excavated, that has gone by different names, but which has now widely usurped the name Perch Creek.

The original Cow Creek drained 266 square kilometres (103 sq mi).
