= Suncor Sarnia Refinery =

Large Industrial Site in Sarnia Canada

Suncor Sarnia Oil Refinery
- Location of the Suncor Sarnia Refinery in Ontario
- Location: Sarnia, Ontario, Ontario, Canada; 42°55′52″N 82°26′23″W

Refinery details
- Operator: Suncor
- Opened: 1952
- Capacity: 85,000 barrels per day (13,500 m^{3}/d)
- Complexity index: 10.8
- No. of employees: 500

The Suncor Sarnia Refinery is an 85,000 bpd cracking plant located in the "Chemical Valley" section of Sarnia, Ontario, Canada alongside the St. Clair River. The refinery has been in continuous operation since 1952 and supplies petroleum products to the southern Ontario region including Toronto and its suburbs via the Sun-Canadian Pipeline. The refinery has roughly 500 employees and contractors who work onsite.

== History ==
=== Early beginnings (1940s–1950s) ===
In 1952, Sun Oil Company (later known as Sunoco, and eventually Suncor Energy), commissioned the Sarnia refinery. The location of the refinery in Sarnia was strategic due to its proximity to both the Alberta oil supply from the creation of the Interprovincial Pipe Line Company (now Enbridge) and major transportation routes along the Great Lakes. The Interprovincial Pipe Line was especially important to bringing Canadian crude to Sarnia. The connection was completed in 1953 and is now part of Enbridge's mainline system.

=== The Suncor and Petro-Canada era (1990s–2010s) ===
During the period 1992-1995, Sun Oil "Sunoco" of Philadelphia sold its 75% ownership of Suncor Canada to the public. The final sale of 25% in 1995 severed Suncor and Sarnia Refinery from the much larger Sunoco. The Sarnia Refinery still maintains several physical pipeline connections to the former Sunoco Toledo, Ohio plant (now PBF) which is approximately twice the size of Sarnia. Sarnia served as Suncor's lone refinery until the purchase of the Commerce City Refinery in Denver, CO in 2003. In 2009, the merger between PetroCanada and Suncor meant that Sarnia would become part of a much larger refining system with plants in Edmonton and Montreal.

A major period of investment was undertaken from 2004-2007 at the site with modernization activities and the construction of several new units. The company disclosed that the total investment was $960 million. Tom Ryley, SVP of Refining said that “Suncor made a substantial investment to strengthen the integration between our oil sands operation in Northern Alberta and our Ontario-based businesses.” At peak, the construction project employed 1,600 workers. Suncor worked 5.8 million man hours without a lost time injury during this project.

== Notable features of the refinery ==
=== Houdry Cracker ===
The Sarnia Refinery is home to a large Houdry Cat Cracker developed by Eugene Houdry, one of the only to ever be constructed. Houdry crackers were a precedent technology to Fluid Catalytic Crackers during WWII and served a critical role to the war effort. The first large Houdry unit was completed at Sunoco's Marcus Hook Refinery in Pennsylvania in 1937 and Sunoco was one of the only operators of the technology after the 1940s. The Houdry Unit at Sarnia has been in continuous operation for nearly 70 years and may be the last of its kind in operation.

=== Shared Hydrotreater with Shell ===
The refinery has a long-term relationship with the nearby Shell Canada Sarnia Refinery to jointly share a hydrotreater. According to Suncor's 2003 annual report the two plants agreed to construct the unit for $300 million with a completion date in 2006:

In October 2003, Suncor and Shell Canada Products Inc. (“Shell”) entered into a 20-year agreement under which Suncor will build hydrotreating facilities at its Sarnia refinery to process high-sulphur diesel from both Suncor’s and Shell’s Sarnia refineries.

== Units ==
According to the Oil & Gas Journal, Sarnia has the following units in operation:

Unit	In BPCD
Total Refinery Nameplate	85,000
Atmospheric Distillation	85,000
Vacuum Distillation	26,730
Houdry Cat Cracking	16,668
Hydrocracking	32,078
Naphtha Reforming	22,957
Naphtha Hydrotreating	25,788
Jet Hydrotreating	5,975
ULSD Hydrotreating	43,588
Other Hydrotreating	6,743
Alkylation	5,503
Aromatics Extraction	13,209
Hydrogen Production in mmscf/d	41

The refinery is complex and has a Nelson Complexity Ratio of 10.8.

== Emissions performance ==
=== Greenhouse gas emissions ===
According to filings made with the Government of Canada, the refinery emits roughly 800,000 tons per year of CO_{2}.

Note all data below can be found publicly at the Government of Canada's environment website.

==== Greenhouse gas (GHG) information ====
===== Facility emissions for 2022 =====
Gas	Sum (tonnes)	Sum (tonnes CO_{2} equivalent )
CO2	733,013.86	733,014
CH_{4}	112.32	3,145
N_{2}O	14.31	3,791
HFCs	0	0
PFCs	0	0
SF6	0	0
Total :		739,950

Year	Emissions (tonnes CO2 equivalent)
2004	806,546
2005	831,809
2006	749,801
2007	675,450
2008	663,658
2009	664,475
2010	643,314
2011	683,741
2012	640,711
2013	618,633
2014	656,749
2015	647,275
2016	672,649
2017	766,439
2018	771,838
2019	771,754
2020	763,022
2021	772,158
2022	739,950

=== Emissions from accidents and abnormal operation - list ===
1996 - Oil Tanker Explosion while loading at the refinery. See also video of the tanker fire on this link: Suncor Fire From American Side.

2003 - Vacuum Crude Unit fire.

2019 - Small fire reported and extinguished.

2022 - Oil spill into the Saint Clair River contained.

2025 - in March the refinery spilled crude oil into the Saint Clair River again.

See also the community tracking blog for Chemical Valley.
