= Brigden, Ontario =

Brigden
- Unincorporated community
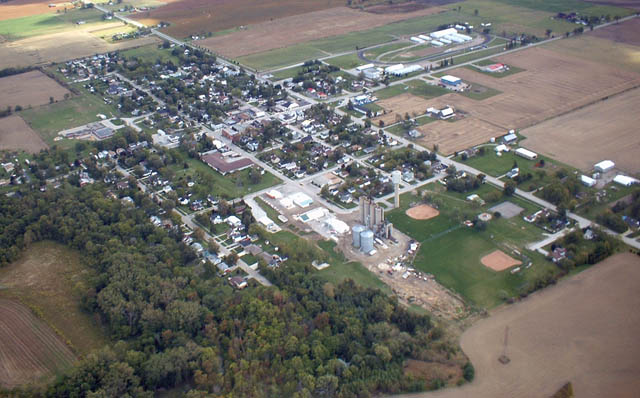
- Etymology: Named after William Wharton Brigden, engineer-surveyor on the Michigan Central Railroad
- Location of Brigden in Ontario
- Coordinates: 42°48′45″N 82°16′58″W
- Country: Canada
- Province: Ontario
- Region: Southwestern Ontario
- County: Lambton
- Township: St. Clair
- Elevation: 191 m (627 ft)
- Time zone: UTC-5 (Eastern Time Zone)
  - Summer (DST): UTC-4 (Eastern Time Zone)
- Postal code: N0N 1B0
- Area codes: 519, 226

Brigden is a community in the township of St. Clair, Lambton County, Ontario, Canada. The community is located at the crossroads of Courtright Line and Brigden Road, between Kimball to the west and Oil City to the east, and about 20 kilometres (12 mi) southeast of the city of Sarnia. Brigden has a population of about 500 and is the centre of a thriving agricultural district.

The community is situated on the former Michigan Central Railroad line and thus is named after William Wharton Brigden, one of the engineers who surveyed the railway in 1936. Brigden died of a heart attack on May 26, 1939, in Battle Creek, Michigan, where he was the superintendent of the city waterworks.

Brigden was a Police village governed by a Village Chairman and a board of trustees.

The annual Brigden Fair is the last fair of the season in Lambton County occurring on Canadian Thanksgiving long weekend. Other annual events include the Brigden Community Fest.

It is also the birthplace of businessman JR Shaw, founder and executive chairman of Shaw Communications.

== Notes ==
- "Brigden". Geographical Names Data Base. Natural Resources Canada.
- "Toporama - Topographic Map Sheet 40J16". Atlas of Canada. Natural Resources Canada. Archived from the original on 2010-08-31.
