= Environmental impact of the chemical industry in Sarnia =

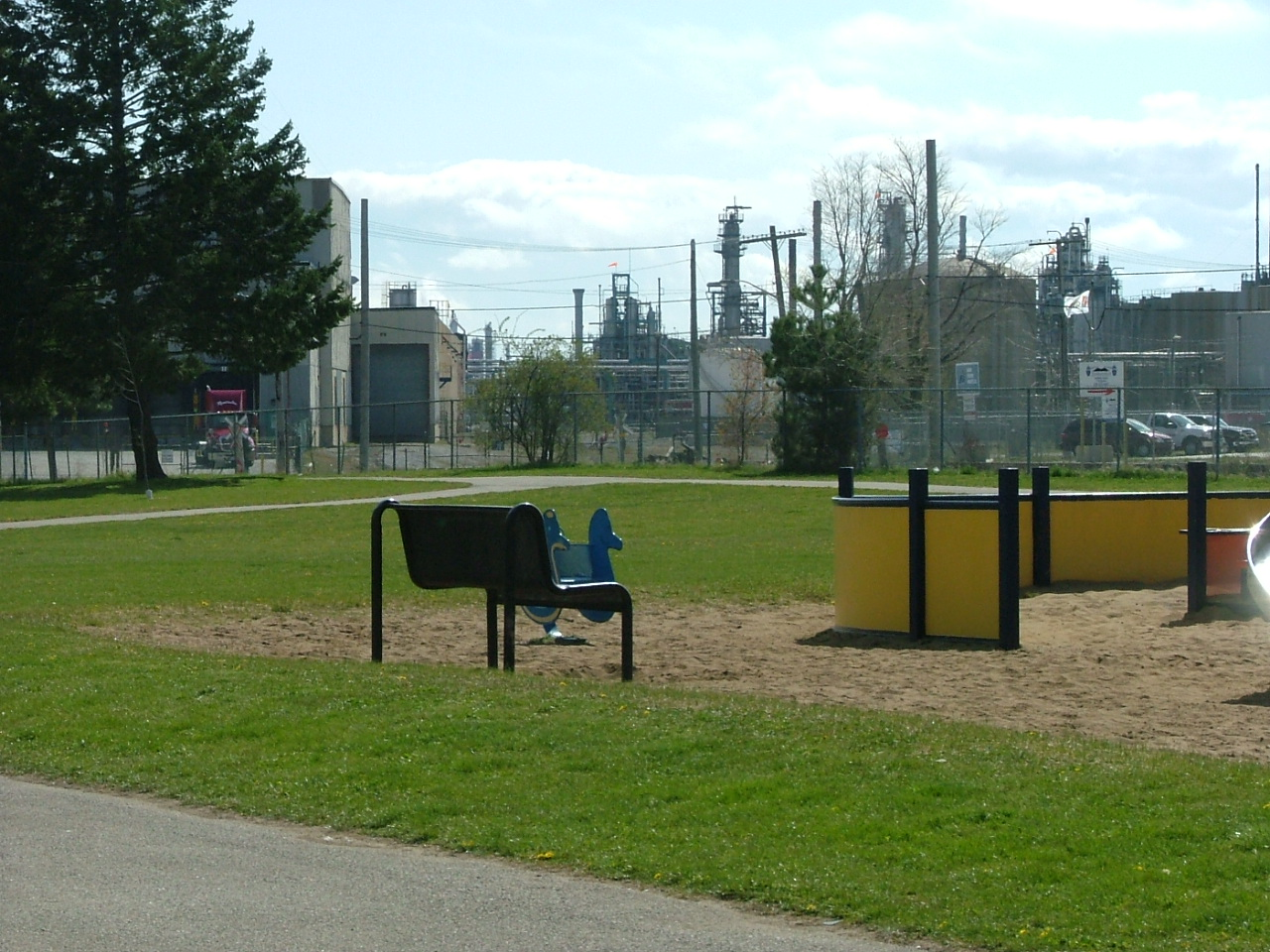
Chemical Valley adjoining Rainbow Park

Sarnia's "Chemical Valley" and the surrounding area are home to 62 chemical facilities and refineries. A 2007 Ecojustice Canada report showed that industrial facilities located within 25 km of Sarnia, Ontario emitted more than 131,000 tonnes of air pollution in 2005.

== Air pollution and disease ==
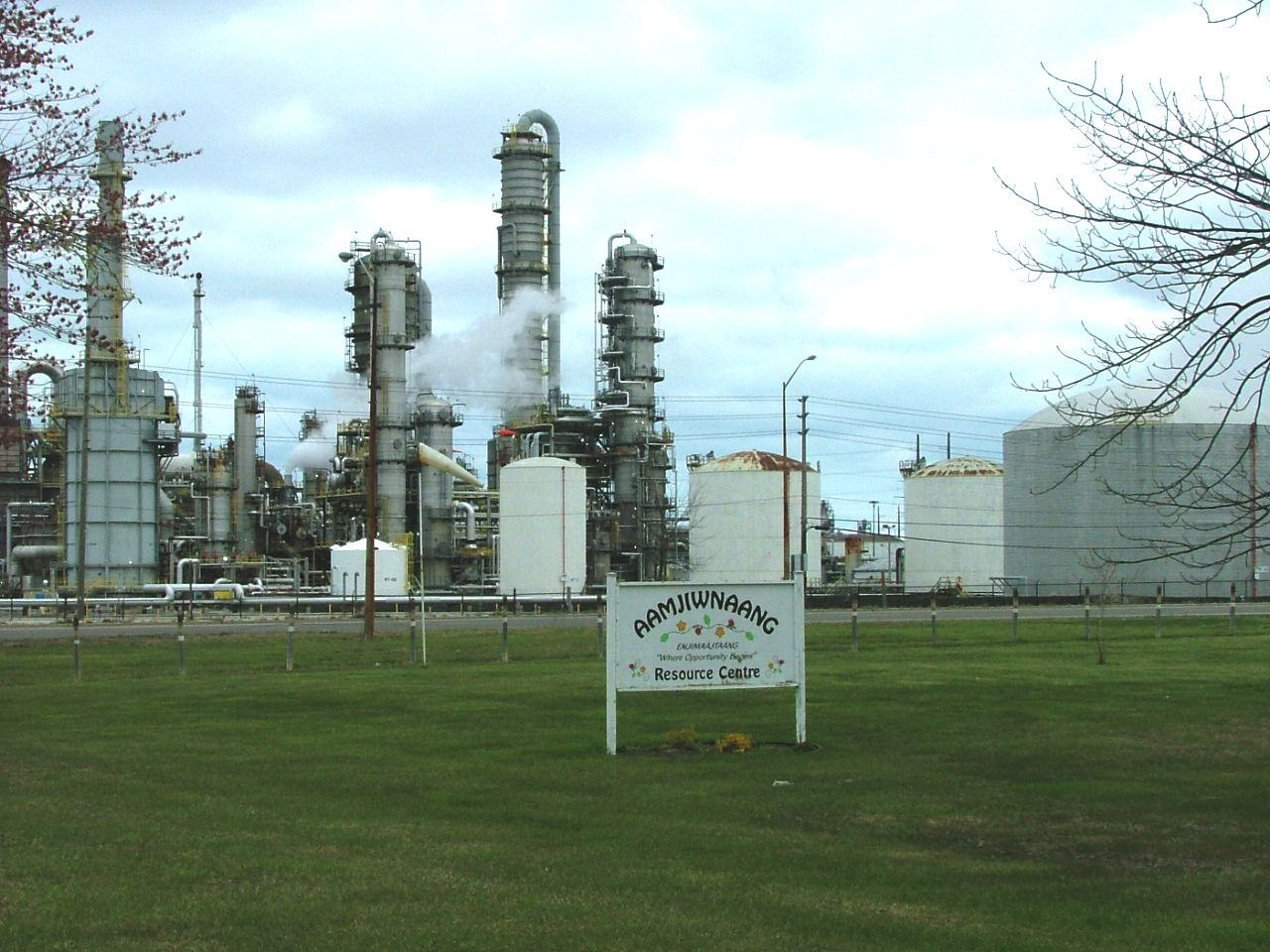
Aamjiwnaang Resource Centre directly across from INEOS Styrolution

In January 2011, the Sarnia Observer noted that "Sarnia had by far the highest levels of fine particulate matter recorded at any of the province's 40 monitoring stations, with significantly sootier air than Windsor, Hamilton, Kingston, and Chatham." In September 2011, the World Health Organization reported that "[w]hile Canada ranks third in the world when it comes to air quality, Sarnia was ranked the worst city in the country, with the most particulate matter per cubic metre of air." Pamela Calvert's 2006 documentary on the Aamjiwnaang First Nation, The Beloved Community, states that the Aamjiwnaang birth rate of males to females is 1 to 2, the lowest live male birth rate in Canada. There is also correlation between living in Sarnia and cancer rates among men — it has a 34% higher overall cancer rate than the provincial average, a lung cancer rate that is 50% higher, a mesothelioma rate five times higher, and an asbestosis rate nine times higher.

However, the Sarnia Observer also stated in their January 2011 article that "Sarnia has reduced its nitrogen dioxide, carbon monoxide and sulfur dioxide problems by 30% in the last three years" and that "Environment Minister John Wilkinson said it's the first time in the report's 39-year history pollutants have not exceeded provincial monitoring standards. That translated into a record low of three smog advisories and five smog days in 2009."

A Lambton County document indicated that in 2005, up to fifty-five percent of ground level ozone and fine particulate matter emissions come from neighbouring United States facilities, which "play a significant role in air quality considerations on a regional scale."

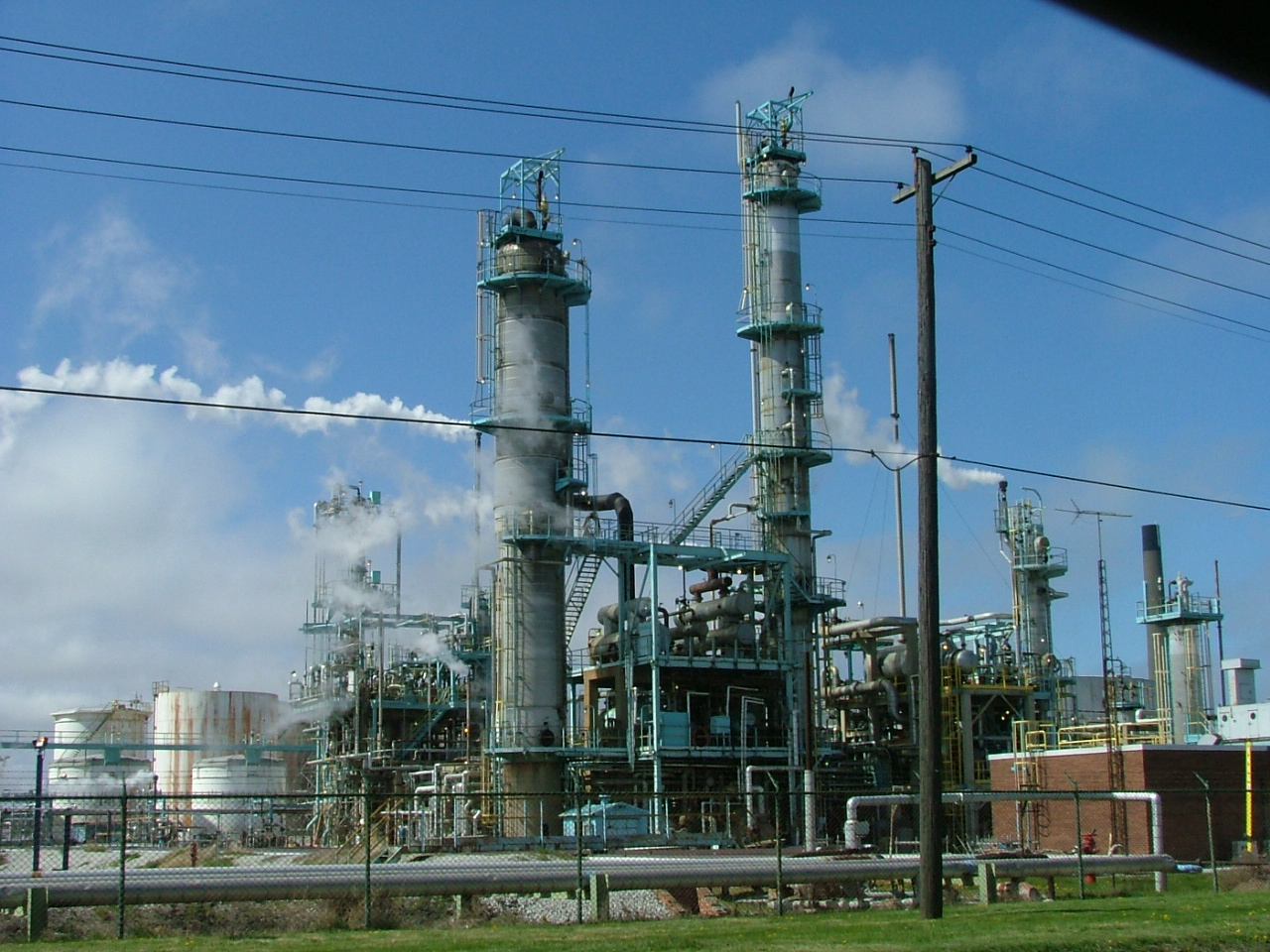
Imperial Oil Refinery

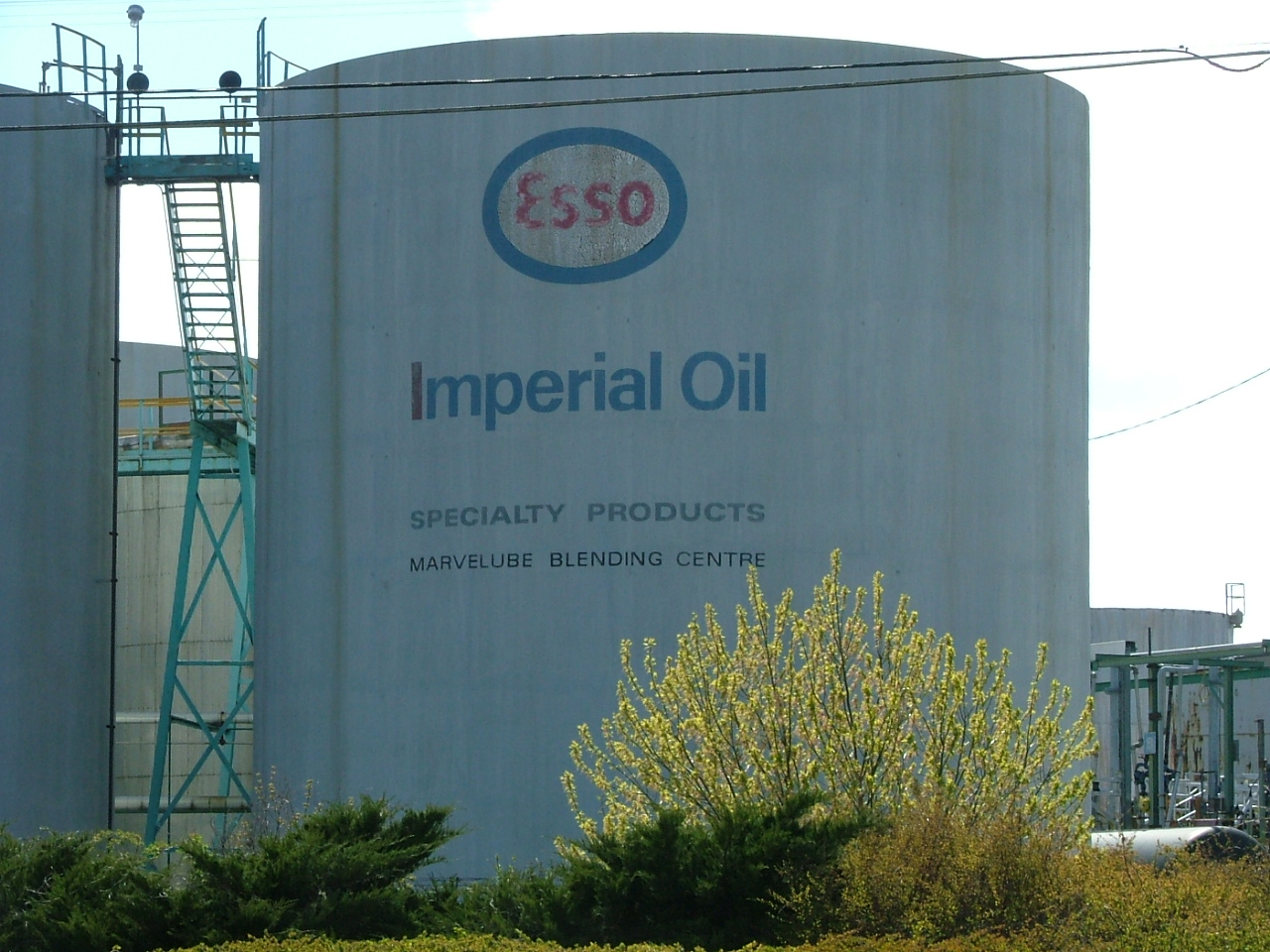
Esso holding tanks which are part of the Imperial Oil Refinery

A 2019 study reviewed incidence of acute myeloid leukemia from 1992 to 2010 in industrial Ontario cities and found that parts of Sarnia had an incidence rate three times higher than the national average.

In April 2024, the Aamjiwnaang council declared a state of emergency due to increased levels of benzene coming from the INEOS Styrolution plant and nearby community members were experiencing headaches and nausea. This was an attempt to prepare resources to be available in order to address the high levels of benzene in the area, as band members were already recommended to avoid outdoor recreational areas due to experienced symptoms.

On May 17, 2024, in response to the state of emergency and elevated benzene levels detected at the INEOS Styrolution fence line and the Aamjiwnaang First Nation, Minister of Environment and Climate Change Steven Guilbeault issued an interim order under the Canadian Environmental Protection Act that would require Sarnia’s petrochemical facilities to implement vapour control measures, “including fully closed vent systems with vapour control on certain storage tanks that store benzene.” The order applies to facilities with fence line concentrations of benzene above 29 μg/m3 measured in any of the two-week sampling periods beginning on March 1, 2023, and ending on February 29, 2024.

On June 11, 2024, INEOS Styrolution announced that it would permanently close its Sarnia facility, and on December 17, 2025 the closure was completed.

== Water pollution ==
Water pollution is a serious concern in Sarnia. A June 2003 Ryerson University study concluded that the main source of water pollution in the St. Clair River occurs at the Sarnia Water Pollution Control Centre (WPCC) due to chemical spills and ship emissions. In 2008, the city resolved to replace the aging sewer pumps that controlled the effluent. Minutes of a meeting between Mayor Mike Bradley and Sarnia City Council state that "[t]he cost of repairing the raw sewage pumps is a significant portion of purchasing a new unit. However, based on the performance of the existing units over the past 8 years, City staff prefers to look at other manufacturers for replacing the existing Fairbanks-Morse pumps as they require their second rebuilding." In 2010, the water distribution report indicated that "no filter effluent turbidity exceeded the prescribed test result for adverse reporting." Further, the report concluded that "[n]o inorganic or organic parameters exceeded half the standard prescribed in Schedule 2 of the Ontario Drinking Water Quality Standards."

== Environmental Defence and justice ==
The Aamjiwnaang First Nations have been advocating for environmental defense to address pollution and health threats for over 100 years as their reserve is located adjacent to Chemical valley.

Lockridge and Plain v. Director, Ministry of the Environment et al. was a legal challenge by Ada Lockridge, an Aamjiwnaang resident, and Ron Plain towards the Ontario Ministry of Environment for not addressing the effects of surrounding industrial activity and a violation of rights under the charter. it was discontinued in 2017 but still is a notable charter based claim for reach environmental justice

The Aamjiwnaang First Nations signed a joint committee agreement with the Environment and Climate Change Canada (ECCC) in 2025 to advance action in addressing environmental issues such as air, water and infrastructure. This agreement has stemmed from the recent passing of Bill C-226 aiming to address environmental racism through national prevention strategies as racialized communities within Canada tend to experience environmental harm more than other communities.

== Shale gas controversy ==
There were plans to bring shale gas into Chemical Valley by pipeline in mid-2013. This process is divisive because it necessitates hydraulic fracturing to extract the gas, which can damage water supplies and produce long-lasting toxic deposits.

== Warning sirens ==
Due to the risk of hazardous materials incidents (chemical emergencies) occurring in the industrial corridor south of Sarnia, four sirens have been placed in Sarnia south of Wellington Street, three more on the Aamjiwnaang First Nation reserve, three in Corunna, and one in Point Edward. In the event of an emergency requiring immediate action by the public, the sirens are sounded for a three-minute period, serving as an alert to the public to seek shelter indoors and to tune to a local radio station for updated instructions. An emergency command centre located at the Sarnia Police Station can coordinate deployments of emergency responders during hazardous materials incidents.

BASES (Bluewater Association for Safety, Environment, and Sustainability) is the leading industry partner in the Sarnia-Lambton region. They also manage the Sarnia-Lambton Alerts system, a regional emergency notification tool used by local municipalities to communicate information including shelter-in-place and evacuation advisories that include emergencies from the petrochemical industry.
