= Corunna, Ontario =

Community in St. Clair, Ontario, Canada

Corunna
- Unincorporated community
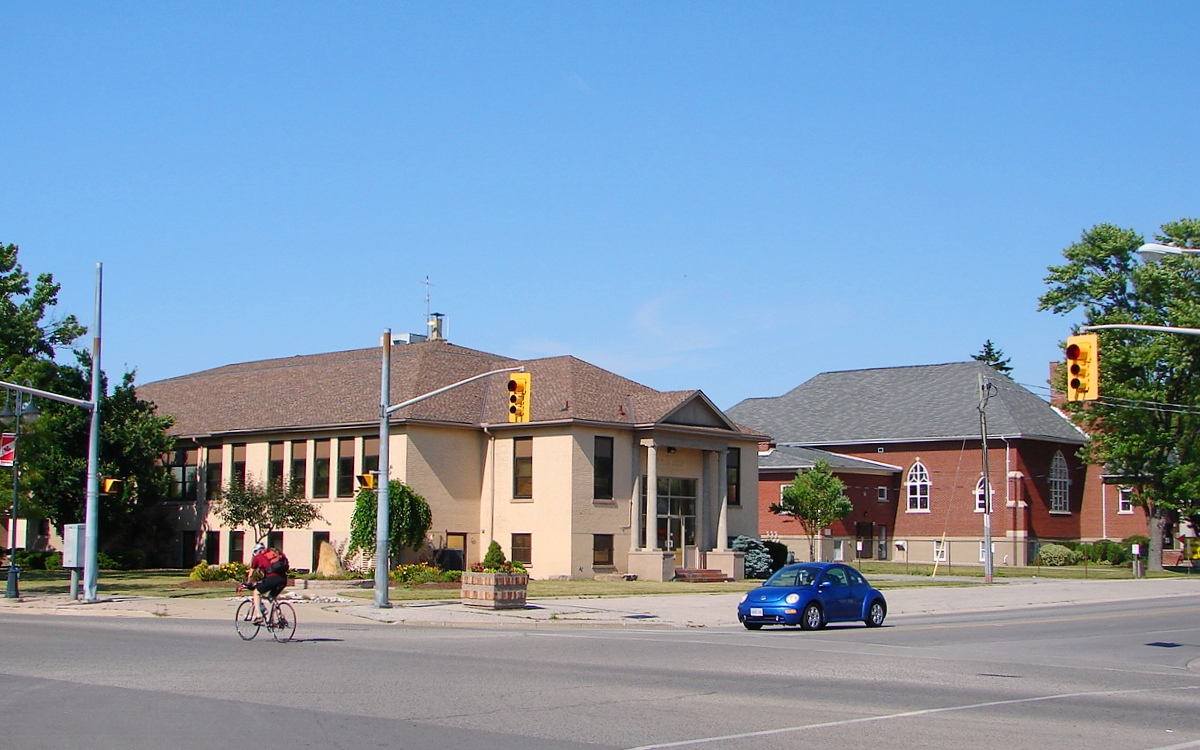

- Location within Southern Ontario
- Coordinates: 42°53′18″N 82°27′12″W
- Country: Canada
- Province: Ontario
- County: Lambton
- Municipality: St. Clair
- Settled: 1820s
- Named for: Battle of Corunna

Area
  - Total: 3.79 km^{2} (1.46 sq mi)
- Elevation: 189 m (620 ft)

Population (2021)
  - Total: 6,266
  - Density: 1,654.5/km^{2} (4,285/sq mi)
- Forward Sortation Area: N0N
- Area Codes: 519, 226 and 548

Corunna is an unincorporated community in St. Clair Township, Lambton County, Ontario, Canada. The site of the community was surveyed by William Beresford in 1823. The community is located approximately 13 kilometres (8.1 mi) south of Sarnia. The community experienced a significant population boom between the 1830s and 1850s, mainly attributed to Scotch-Irish immigration. The community is located near Chemical Valley, a major petrochemical and plastics manufacturing facility.

== History ==
The area around what became Corunna was inhabited by several Anishinaabe First Nations tribes, including the Mississauga, Odawa, and Ojibwe, prior to European colonization. It is south of the Aamjiwnaang First Nation. The first European exploration of the region came in 1823, when William Beresford led an expedition up the St. Clair River. Plans were drawn up for the creation of a new capital for The Province of Upper Canada, designed to be 160 hectares (400 acres) in area. A central area named St. George's Square was planned, which would have housed most of Canada's governmental buildings. Plans for the capital were ultimately cancelled over protests by residents of Lower Canada due to its non-central location, as well as concerns over proximity to the United States.

=== Chemical Valley ===
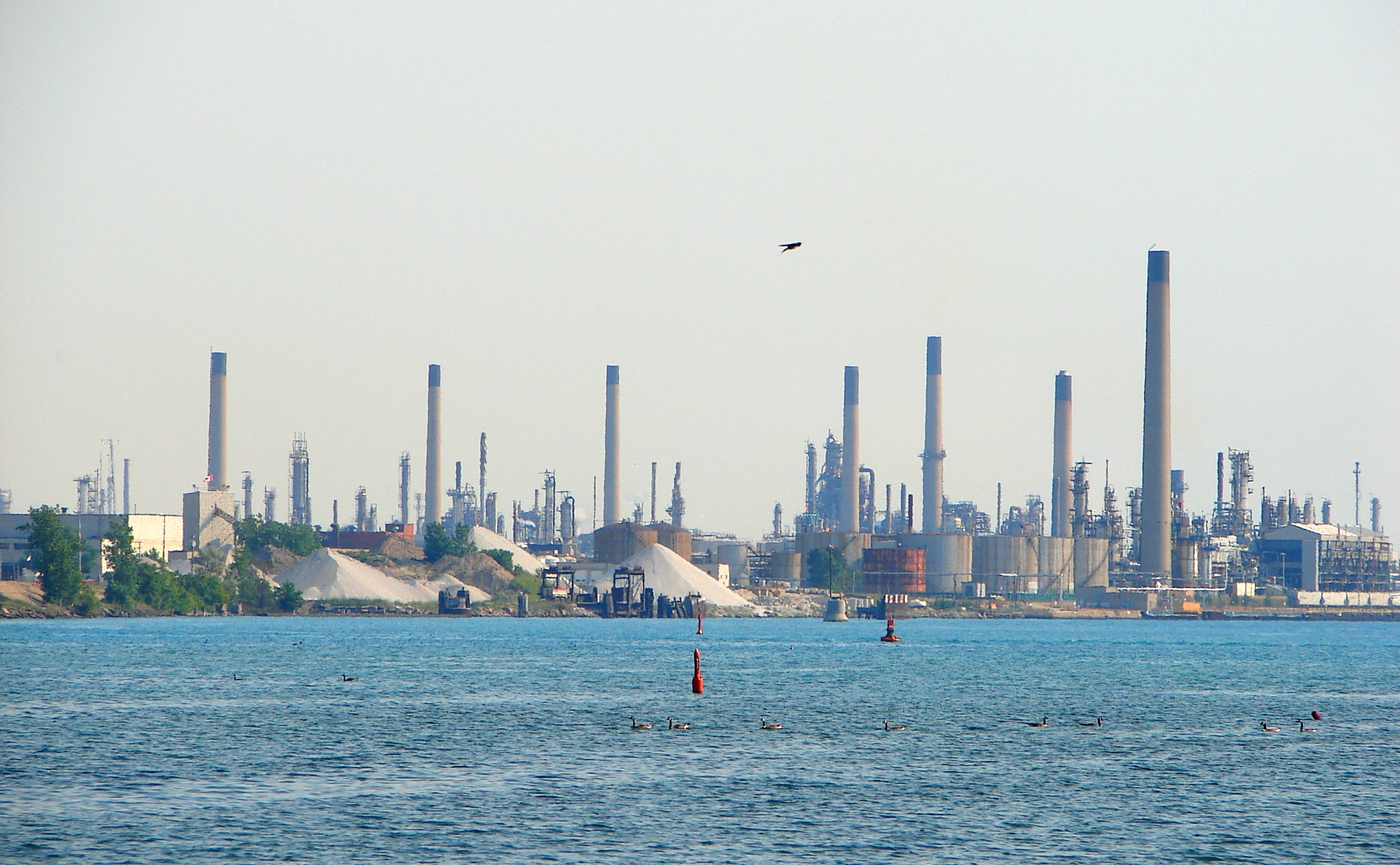
Chemical Valley in Sarnia

After oil was discovered in nearby Oil Springs, several refineries were built along the coast near Corunna. This site would later become Chemical Valley, beginning with the opening of a synthetic rubber plant by Polymer Corporation in 1942, intended to amend rubber shortages faced by the Allied Forces in World War II. The plant produced an average of 3,300 tons of rubber per month during World War II, and continued production afterwards. Other companies began opening plants at the location in the years after World War II, including NOVA Chemicals, Dow chemicals, Imperial Oil, and Suncor Energy. The discovery of salt deposits below the area in 1866 helped establish a chlorine production industry.

As deindustrialization swept across the region, many plants in Chemical Valley closed down, ceased operations, or were sold off. Corunna experienced a significant decline in population as a result, since the local economy is largely tied to the Valley. As early as 2014, attempts were made to revitalize the region through the expansion of existing plants. With investments made by Shell, Nova Chemicals, and Dow Chemicals, several abandoned plants in Chemical Valley have re-opened; new investments by Bayer, Bioindustrial Innovation Canada, and TransAlta have also contributed to growth.

== Demographics ==
Population
Year	Pop.	±%
2011	5,892	—
2016	5,686	−3.5%
2021	6,266	+10.2%

In 2021, Corunna had a population of 6,266. This was an increase of 10.2% from 2016, when the population was 5,686. With a primarily suburban population, Corunna has an area of 3.79 square kilometres (1.46 mi^{2}), with a population density of 1,654.5 inhabitants per square kilometre (4,285/sq mi).

The community consists primarily of those with European ancestry; As of the 2021 census, 4.5% of the population identified as Aboriginal, 2.8% identified as Visible minorities, and 97.2% identified as white. Of those who identified as white, 22.9% identified as ethnically Canadian (Percentages do not add up to 100% due to the ability to select multiple options).

Corunna has a median age of 39.6, slightly lower than Canada's average of 41.2 in the same census. The median household income in Corunna is $118,000.

== Notable residents ==
- Stan Cassin, Albertan politician
- Derek Drouin, Olympian gold medalist
- James A. Hughes, American Congressman
- Rob Thomson, manager of the Philadelphia Phillies
- Paul Ysebaert, NHL Hockey Player
