= Courtright, Ontario =

Courtright
- Unincorporated community
- Location within Southern Ontario
- Coordinates: 42°49′N 82°28′W
- Country: Canada
- Province: Ontario
- County: Lambton
- Municipality: St. Clair
- Incorporated: June 25, 1907
- Disincorporated: 1974

Courtright is an unincorporated community in St. Clair Township, Lambton County, Ontario, Canada. It is located on the St. Clair River, south of Sarnia. It was incorporated as a village on June 25, 1907, and disincorporated in 1974.
