= Lambton County =

- County (upper-tier)
- County of Lambton
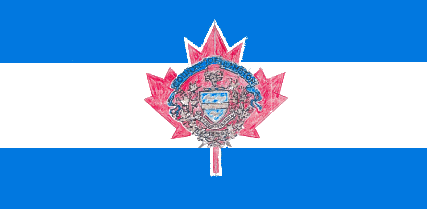
- Flag Seal

- Location of Lambton County
- Coordinates: 42°54′N 82°06′W
- Country: Canada
- Province: Ontario
- Formed: 1849
- County seat: Wyoming
- Municipalities: List: City of Sarnia; Municipality (city) of Lambton Shores; Town of Petrolia; Town of Plympton-Wyoming; Township of Brooke-Alvinston; Township of Dawn-Euphemia; Township of Enniskillen; Township of St. Clair; Township of Warwick; Village of Oil Springs; Village of Point Edward

Area
  - Land: 2,999.93 km^{2} (1,158.28 sq mi)

Population (2021)
  - Total: 128,154
  - Density: 42.7/km^{2} (111/sq mi)
- Demonym: Lambtoneer
- Time zone: UTC-5 (EST)
  - Summer (DST): UTC-4 (EDT)
- Website: www.lambtononline.ca/

Lambton County is a county in Southwestern Ontario, Canada. It is bordered on the north by Lake Huron, which is drained by the St. Clair River, the county's western border and part of the Canada-United States border. To the south is Lake Saint Clair and Chatham-Kent. Lambton County's northeastern border follows the Ausable River and Parkhill Creek north until it reaches Lake Huron at the beach community of Grand Bend. The county seat is in the Town of Plympton-Wyoming.

The largest city in Lambton County is Sarnia, which is located at the source of the St. Clair River at Lake Huron. The two Blue Water Bridges cross the river at Sarnia, connecting it to Port Huron, Michigan. The bridges are one of the busiest border crossings between the two countries. The river is also traversed by one passenger ferry further south, and a rail tunnel, also at Sarnia, runs underneath it. The CN rail tunnel accommodates double stacked rail cars. Along with Sarnia, the population centres in Lambton County are: Corunna, Petrolia, Grand Bend, Wyoming, Forest, and Watford.

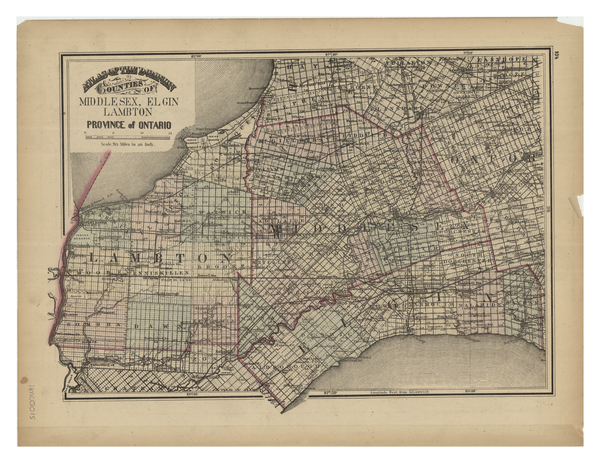
Historical map that includes Lambton County (1875)

Lambton County started as a part of the District of Hesse. The district of Hesse included British territories west of Long Point (practically all of western Ontario). The district was later divided and renamed using English district names (Essex, Suffolk, Kent, etc.). Lambton was part of Kent county. In 1849 districts were abolished and the County of Lambton was formed. Lambton and Kent first shared the capital city of Sandwich (since renamed Windsor, Ontario). In 1852 the partnership was dissolved and Lambton become a full county. It is named in honour of John Lambton, 1st Earl of Durham, who visited the area in the late 1830s.

== Subdivisions ==
Lambton County consists of 11 municipalities (in order of population):

- City of Sarnia
- Township of St. Clair
- Municipality of Lambton Shores
- Town of Plympton–Wyoming
- Town of Petrolia
- Township of Warwick
- Township of Enniskillen
- Township of Brooke-Alvinston
- Village of Point Edward
- Township of Dawn-Euphemia
- Village of Oil Springs

=== Independent First Nation reserves ===
Independent of the County, but located within the Lambton census division, are three First Nations reserves:

- Chippewas of Kettle and Stony Point First Nation, in the Kettle Point area
- Aamjiwnaang First Nation, located near many of the refineries in Sarnia's Chemical Valley
- Walpole Island, near Wallaceburg

== Demographics ==
As a census division in the 2021 Census of Population conducted by Statistics Canada, Lambton County had a population of 128,154 living in 55,205 of its 60,322 total private dwellings, a change of 1.2% from its 2016 population of 126,638. With a land area of 2,999.93 km^{2} (1,158.28 sq mi), it had a population density of 42.7/km^{2} (110.6/sq mi) in 2021.

Canada census – Lambton community profile

| | 2021 | 2016 | 2011 |
| Population | 128,154 (+1.2% from 2016) | 126,638 (0.3% from 2011) | 126,199 (-1.6% from 2006) |
| Land area | 2,999.93 km^{2} (1,158.28 sq mi) | 3,002.25 km^{2} (1,159.18 sq mi) | 3,002.07 km^{2} (1,159.11 sq mi) |
| Population density | 42.7/km^{2} (111/sq mi) | 42.2/km^{2} (109/sq mi) | 42.0/km^{2} (109/sq mi) |
| Median age | 46.4 (M: 44.8, F: 48.0) | 43.9 (M: 42.8, F: 44.8) |
| Private dwellings | 60,322 (total) 55,205 (occupied) | 54,480 (total) | 58,243 (total) |
| Median household income | $83,000 |

Notes: Excludes census data for one or more incompletely enumerated Indian reserves
References: 2021 2016 2011

Historical population
| Year | Pop. | ±% |
|---|---|---|
| 1996 | 126,829 | — |
| 2001 | 123,611 | −2.5% |
| 2006 | 124,600 | +0.8% |
| 2011 | 124,623 | +0.0% |
| 2016 | 123,399 | −1.0% |
| 2021 | 128,154 | +3.9% |
Statistics Canada:

== Economy ==
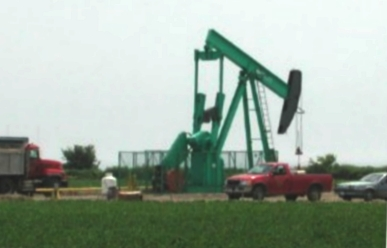
An oil well near Sarnia

Total employment for Lambton County is 66,370. Of those, 9,760 (14.7%) are employed in manufacturing; 7,545 (11.4%) in retail trade; 5,080 (7.7%) in accommodation and food services; and 3,155 (4.8%) are employed in agriculture.

Petrochemical and refining is the largest manufacturing sector in Lambton County's economy. Established during World War II, Sarnia and the area along the St. Clair River is home to a major processing centre for oil from Alberta.

In late 2010 and early 2011 a number of companies announced plans to provide ethane from the Marcellus Shale in the United States to Lambton County industries, providing a potential new feedstock for the production of ethylene in Lambton County.

Lambton County is the site of North America's first drilled commercial oil well at Oil Springs in 1858.

Tourism is another important industry in Lambton County, especially along the lake and river. The community of Grand Bend and the Pinery Provincial Park are especially popular tourist destinations, attracting thousands of people each week throughout the summer to their long, uninterrupted beaches. The part of Lambton County along Lake Huron known as Lambton Shores depends almost entirely upon the seasonal industries of tourism and agriculture for its well-being. There are also popular conservation areas along the St. Clair River, and a conservation area named Rock Glen Falls near Arkona along the Ausauble River internationally known for its Devonian period fossils.

Lambton County has 2,346 farms with a total of 592,793 acres. The largest single use of farmland in Lambton is crop production, with 85% of total farmland reported as land in crops. Over the last 20 years, soybeans, wheat, and grain corn have accounted for over 80% of total area crop production in Lambton. The fourth and fifth leading crops are sugar beets and hay. Oats, barley and mixed grains are also produced. Top animal production includes dairy, beef, hog, and poultry.

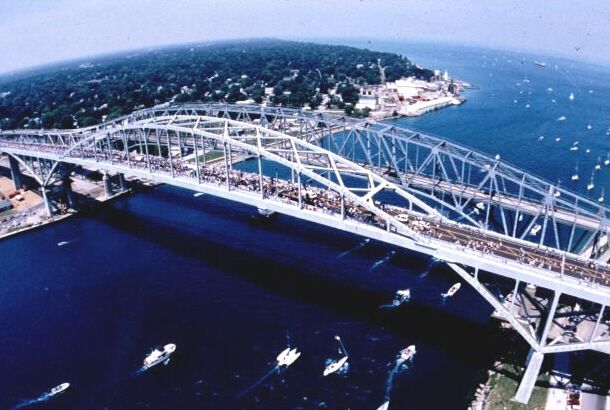
The Blue Water Bridges

== Infrastructure ==
=== Highways ===
- Highway 402 ends in Sarnia at the Blue Water Bridge, where it meets at the U.S. border and connects with I-94 / I-69.

=== Emergency services ===
The County of Lambton Emergency Medical Services (EMS) provides land ambulance services to the residents of Lambton County. The County of Lambton EMS has stations in Brigden, Corunna, Forest, Grand Bend, Petrolia, Thedford, Watford, and two stations in Sarnia. Lambton EMS has ten ambulances and employs approximately 150 full- and part-time Primary Care Paramedics.

Policing is provided by the Ontario Provincial Police (OPP), which has detachments in Grand Bend, Petrolia, Corunna, and Point Edward. The area of Kettle & Stony Point which is one of three native reservations in Lambton County, is policed by the Anishinabek Police Service (APS) but dispatched by the OPP. Walpole Island, another first nations reservation has its own police service, the Walpole Island Police Service. The remaining first nations reservation, Aamjiwnaang First Nation, which falls geographically within the City of Sarnia, is covered by the Sarnia Police Service.

== Communities ==
- Alvinston
- Arkona
- Brigden
- Brights Grove
- Corunna
- Courtright
- Forest
- Grand Bend
- Osborne
- Petrolia
- Port Franks
- Port Lambton
- Sarnia
- Sombra
- Thedford
- Walpole Island
- Watford
- Wyoming

== See also ==
- Lambton Generating Station
- List of municipalities in Ontario
- List of Ontario Census Divisions
- List of townships in Ontario
- List of secondary schools in Ontario#Lambton County
