= Aamjiwnaang First Nation =

First Nations Band in Ontario, Canada

Aamjiwnaang
- Band No. 172
- People: Ojibwe
- Treaty: Treaty 29
- Headquarters: Sarnia
- Province: Ontario

Land
- Other reserve: Sarnia 45
- Land area: 12.805 km^{2} (4.944 sq mi)

Population (2025)
- On reserve: 901
- On other land: 82
- Off reserve: 1620
- Total population: 2603

Government
- Chief: Janelle Yvonne Nahmabin
- Council: 2024–2026: John Quincy Adams; Sherri Lynn Crowley; Darren Lee Henry; Michael John Jackson; James Kenneth Plain; Marina Denise Plain; Joanne Gail Rogers; June Renee Simon; Justin (Cj) Benjamin Smith-White

Website
- www.aamjiwnaang.ca

Aamjiwnaang First Nation (formerly Chippewas of Sarnia First Nation; Ojibwe: Aamjiwnaang Anishinaabek, lit. 'at the spawning stream') is an Anishinaabe (Ojibwe) First Nations Band located on reserve land by the St. Clair River in Ontario, Canada, three miles south of the southern tip of Lake Huron. The reserve is located across from the United States border from Port Huron, Michigan, and is a result of treaties that were negotiated with the Crown in the 1820s. There are approximately 2,600 band members with about 900 living on the reserve. Their heritage language is Ojibwe.

The word Aamjiwnaang (am-JIN-nun) means "meeting place by the rapid water", which describes the surrounding communities.

== Environmental issues ==
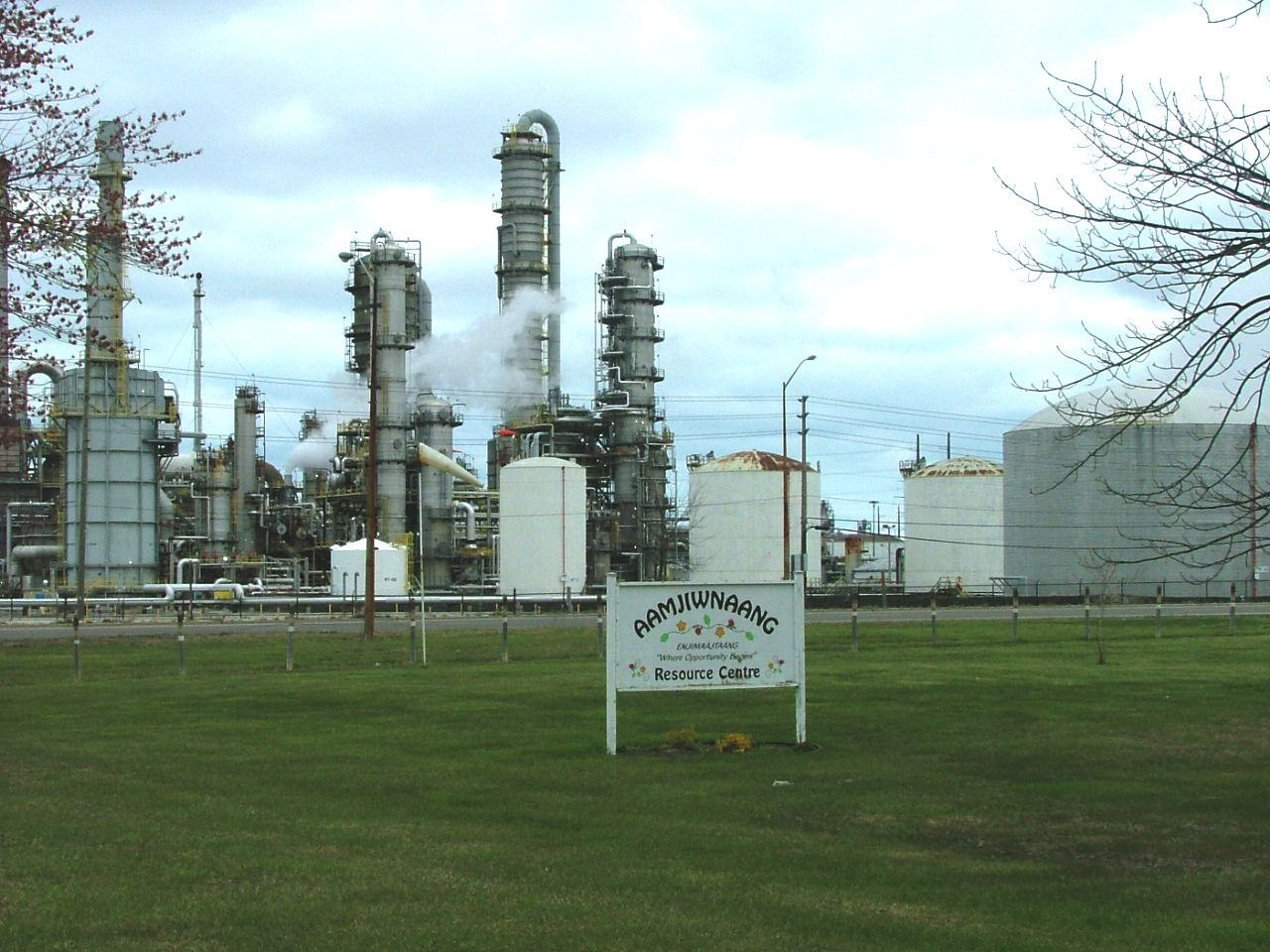
Aamjiwnaang Resource Centre directly across from Ineos Styrolution

The Aamjiwnaang community has expressed concern regarding its proximity to petrochemical, polymer, and chemical plants in the area, as birth rates of their people have been documented by the American journal Environmental Health Perspectives as deviating from the normal ratio of close to 50% boys, 50% girls. The ratio as found between 1999 and 2003 by the journal was roughly 33% boys, and 67% girls, the lowest live male birth rate in Canada.

On April 25, 2024, Aamjiwnaang announced a state of emergency after preliminary data from an air pollutant monitor in the community showed elevated levels of benzene. Seven days earlier, the Ministry of the Environment, Conservation and Parks issued a provincial order to nearby Ineos Styrolution, and the facility shutdown operations temporarily.

On May 17, 2024, in response to the state of emergency in April, the federal government issued an Interim Order to the petrochemical industry in Sarnia. It targeted petrochemical plants whose fenceline benzene levels were above 29 μg/m^{3} in any two-week sample between March 1, 2023, and February 29, 2024. Facilities in excess of this concentration must add vapour control measures. The order was in effect for 14 days after its issue, but on May 28, 2024, the interim order was extended for a period of two years. On June 11, 2024, INEOS Styrolution announced that it would permanently close its Sarnia facility, and on December 17, 2025, the closure was completed.

On March 26, 2025, the “Reduction in the Release of Volatile Organic Compounds (Storage and Loading of Volatile Petroleum Liquids) Regulations” were finalized, which apply to manufacturing plants and refineries to require emission control equipment.

== Demographics ==
Canada census – Sarnia 45 community profile

	2021	2016	2011
Population	648 (+1.4% from 2016)	639 (-0.2% from 2011)	640 (-9.3% from 2006)
Land area	12.58 km^{2} (4.86 sq mi)	12.57 km^{2} (4.85 sq mi)	12.57 km^{2} (4.85 sq mi)
Population density	51.5/km^{2} (133/sq mi)	50.8/km^{2} (132/sq mi)	50.9/km^{2} (132/sq mi)
Median age	38.8 (M: 38.4, F: 39.2)	38.0 (M: 36.7, F: 39.3)	32.8 (M: 30.9, F: 36.1)
Private dwellings	265 (total)	255 (total)	254 (total)
Median household income

References: 2021 2016 2011

Historical population
Year	Pop.	±%
1991	494	—
1996	621	+25.7%
2001	695	+11.9%
2006	706	+1.6%
2011	640	−9.3%
2016	639	−0.2%
2021	648	+1.4%

== Notable members ==
- Lisa Jackson (filmmaker)
- Christopher Plain - Previous Chief
- June Simon - Band Manager
- Carolyn Nahmabin - Membership
- Fred Plain - Former President of the Union of Ontario Indians
- David D. Plain - Author of The Plains of Aamjiwnaang:Our History

== See also ==
- Chippewas of Sarnia Band v. Canada (Attorney General)
- Environmental impact of the chemical industry in Sarnia
- Cancer Alley
- Uranium mining and the Navajo people
