= 2014 Lambton County municipal elections =

Local election in Ontario, Canada

Elections were held in Lambton County, Ontario on October 27, 2014 in conjunction with municipal elections across the province.

== Lambton County Council ==
County council includes the mayors of each constituent municipality, the deputy mayors of Lambton Shores and St. Clair plus four city councillors from Sarnia.

Position	Elected
Brooke-Alvinston Mayor	Don McGugan
Dawn-Euphemia Mayor	Alan Broad (acclaimed)
Enniskillen Mayor	Kevin Marriott (acclaimed)
Lambton Shores Mayor	Bill Weber
Lambton Shores Deputy Mayor	Doug Cook
Oil Springs Mayor	Ian Veen
Petrolia Mayor	John McCharles
Plympton-Wyoming Mayor	Lonny Napper (acclaimed)
Point Edward Mayor	Larry MacKenzie (acclaimed)
Sarnia Mayor	Mike Bradley
Sarnia Councillor	Anne Marie Gillis
Sarnia Councillor	Bev MacDougall
Sarnia Councillor	Andy Bruziewicz
Sarnia Councillor	Dave Boushy
St. Clair Mayor	Steve Arnold (acclaimed)
St. Clair Deputy Mayor	Peter Gilliland (acclaimed)
Warwick Mayor	Todd Case (acclaimed)

== Brooke-Alvinston ==
Mayoral Candidate	Vote	%
Don McGugan (X)	721	58.38
Jamie Armstrong	514	41.62

== Dawn-Euphemia ==
Mayoral Candidate	Vote	%
Alan Broad	Acclaimed	

== Enniskillen ==
Mayoral Candidate	Vote	%
Kevin Marriott (X)	Acclaimed	

== Lambton Shores ==
Mayoral Candidate	Vote	%
Bill Weber (X)	2,737	45.59
John Russell	1,783	29.70
Elizabeth Davis-Dagg	1,483	24.70

== Oil Springs ==
Mayoral Candidate	Vote	%
Ian Veen (X)	227	57.76
Gordon Perry	166	42.24

== Petrolia ==
Mayoral Candidate	Vote	%
John McCharles (X)	1,310	81.93
Jeff Johnston	289	18.07

== Plympton-Wyoming ==
Mayoral Candidate	Vote	%
Lonny Napper (X)	Acclaimed	

== Point Edward ==
Mayoral Candidate	Vote	%
Larry Mackenzie (X)	Acclaimed	

== Sarnia ==
Mayoral Candidate	Vote	%
Mike Bradley (X)	13,174	66.39
James J. Carpento	4,811	24.24
Jake Cherski	1,386	6.98
Fred Ingham	473	2.38

== St. Clair ==
Mayoral Candidate	Vote	%
Steve Arnold (X)	Acclaimed	

== Warwick ==
Mayoral Candidate	Vote	%
Todd Case (X)	Acclaimed	
