= 2010 Lambton County municipal elections =

Local election in Ontario, Canada

Elections were held in Lambton County, Ontario on October 25, 2010 in conjunction with municipal elections across the province.

== Lambton County Council ==
Position	Elected
Brooke-Alvinston Mayor	Don McGugan
Dawn-Euphemia Mayor	Bill Bilton
Enniskillen Mayor	Jim Burns
Lambton Shores Mayor	Bill Weber
Lambton Shores Deputy Mayor	Elizabeth Davis-Dagg
Oil Springs Mayor	Ian Veen
Petrolia Mayor	John McCharles
Plympton-Wyoming Mayor	Lonny Napper
Point Edward Mayor	Dick Kirkland
Sarnia Mayor	Mike Bradley
Sarnia Councillor	Jim Foubister
Sarnia Councillor	Dave Boushy
Sarnia Councillor	Anne Marie Gillis
Sarnia Councillor	Bev MacDougall
St. Clair Mayor	Steve Arnold
St. Clair Deputy Mayor	Pete Gilliland
Warwick Mayor	Todd Case

== Brooke-Alvinston ==
Mayoral Candidate	Vote	%
Don McGugan (X)	921	
Ken Campbell	353	
Kenneth Dew	84	

== Dawn-Euphemia ==
Mayoral Candidate	Vote	%
Bill Bilton (X)	Acclaimed	

== Enniskillen ==
Mayoral Candidate	Vote	%
Jim Burns (X)	Acclaimed	

== Lambton Shores ==
Mayoral Candidate	Vote	%
Bill Weber	2,196	
John Dehondt	2,027	
Mark Simpson	1,351	
Syd Fletcher	604	
Marvin Wallace	79	

== Oil Springs ==
Mayoral Candidate	Vote	%
Ian Veen	186	
Gord Perry (X)	134	

== Petrolia ==
Mayoral Candidate	Vote	%
John McCharles (X)	Acclaimed	

== Plympton-Wyoming ==
Mayoral Candidate	Vote	%
Lonny Napper (X)	Acclaimed	

== Point Edward ==
Mayoral Candidate	Vote	%
Dick Kirkland (X)	433	
Roger Gallaway	361	
Janice Robson	170	

== Sarnia ==
Mayoral Candidate	Vote	%
Mike Bradley (X)	12,453	69.83
John Vollmar	4,424	24.81
Zak Nicholls	566	3.17
Carlos Murray	390	2.19

== St. Clair ==
Mayoral Candidate	Vote	%
Steve Arnold (X)	Acclaimed	

== Warwick ==
Mayoral Candidate	Vote	%
Todd Case (X)	Acclaimed	
