= St. Clair Catholic District School Board =

Catholic school board in Ontario, Canada

St. Clair Catholic District School Board SCCDSB

Location
- 420 Creek Street, Wallaceburg, Ontario Sarnia, Lambton County, Chatham-Kent Canada
- Coordinates: 42.59709°N 82.38646°W

District information
- Business administrator: Amy Park
- Chair of the board: John Van Heck
- Director of education: Lisa Demers
- Schools: 25 total; 23 elementary and 2 secondary
- District ID: B67040

Students and staff
- Students: 13K (approx.)

Other information
- Website: www.st-clair.net

The St. Clair Catholic District School Board (SCCDSB, known as English-language Separate District School Board No. 39 prior to 1999) is the separate school board that manages Catholic education in the county of Lambton including the city of Sarnia as well as in the regional municipality of Chatham-Kent including the city of Chatham, in southern Ontario, Canada.

The Board was formed by an amalgamation of the Lambton County Roman Catholic Separate School Board and Kent County Roman Catholic Separate School Board, which took place in 1999.

== Schools ==
The Board manages 23 elementary schools and 2 secondary or high schools.

=== Elementary ===
List of Elementary Schools in the St. Clair Catholic District School Board
School name	City	Grades	Additional Notes
Christ The King Catholic School	Wallaceburg, Ontario	JK-8	French Immersion
Georges P. Vanier Catholic School	Chatham, Ontario	JK-8	
Good Shepherd Catholic School	Thamesville, Ontario	JK-8	
Gregory A. Hogan School	Sarnia, Ontario	JK-8	French Immersion
Holy Family Catholic School	Wallaceburg, Ontario	JK-8	
Holy Rosary Catholic School	Wyoming, Ontario	JK-8	
Holy Trinity Catholic School	Sarnia, Ontario	JK-8	
Monsignor Uyen Catholic School	Chatham, Ontario	JK-8	French Immersion
Sacred Heart Catholic School	Port Lambton, Ontario	JK-8	
Sacred Heart Catholic School	Sarnia, Ontario	JK-8	
St. Angela Merici Catholic School	Chatham, Ontario	JK-8	
St. Anne Catholic School	Blenheim, Ontario	JK-8	French Immersion
St. Anne Catholic Elementary School	Sarnia, Ontario	JK-8	
St. Elizabeth Catholic School	Wallaceburg, Ontario	JK-8	
St. John Fisher Catholic School	Forest, Ontario	JK-8	
St. Joseph Catholic School	Corunna, Ontario	JK-8	
St. Joseph Catholic School	Tilbury, Ontario	JK-8	
St. Matthew Catholic School	Sarnia, Ontario	JK-8	
St. Michael Catholic School	Bright's Grove	JK-8	
St. Michael Catholic School	Ridgetown, Ontario	JK-8	
St. Peter Canisius Catholic School	Watford, Ontario	JK-8	
St. Philip Catholic School	Petrolia, Ontario	JK-8	
St. Ursula Catholic School	Chatham, Ontario	JK-8	

=== Secondary ===
- St. Patrick's Catholic High School in Sarnia
- Ursuline College Chatham in Chatham

== See also ==
- Lambton Kent District School Board
- List of school districts in Ontario
- List of high schools in Ontario
