= William Campbell (Canadian politician) =

Canadian politician (born 1929)

William "Bill" Campbell

Member of Parliament for Sarnia—Lambton
- In office 22 May 1979 – 18 February 1980
- Preceded by: Bud Cullen
- Succeeded by: Bud Cullen

Personal details
- Born: 1929 (age 96–97) Sarnia, Ontario, Canada
- Party: Progressive Conservative
- Profession: Politician, Process Operator, Farmer

William Campbell (born 1929) is a retired Canadian politician who was a Progressive Conservative Party member of the House of Commons of Canada.

== Biography ==
Campbell was a process operator and farmer by career. He was a municipal politician in Sarnia Township (today part of the city of Sarnia), initially as a councillor from 1970 to 1976, then from 1976 to 1978 as deputy reeve.

Campbell was a member of the 31st Canadian Parliament after defeating Liberal candidate Bud Cullen at the Sarnia riding in the 1979 federal election. Campbell's term was short as Cullen won back his parliamentary seat in the 1980 election.

== Electoral record ==
=== Sarnia ===
1980 Canadian federal election
Party	Candidate	Votes	%	±%
Liberal	Bud Cullen	16,275	40.6%	+5.9%
Progressive Conservative	Bill Campbell	13,986	34.9%	-5.1%
New Democratic	Wally Krawczyk	9,809	24.4%	-0.9%
Marxist–Leninist	Pedro Villamizar	52	0.1%	
Total valid votes		40,122	100.0%	

Source: Elections Canada

1979 Canadian federal election
Party	Candidate	Votes	%	±%
Progressive Conservative	Bill Campbell	15,990	40.0%	+13.7%
Liberal	Bud Cullen	13,872	34.7%	-22.0%
New Democratic	Wally Krawczyk	10,148	25.4%	+8.3%
Total valid votes		40,010	100.0%	

Source: Elections Canada
