= Canadian House of Commons Standing Committee on the Status of Women =

Standing committee of the House of Commons of Canada

The House of Commons Standing Committee on the Status of Women (FEWO) is a standing committee of the House of Commons of Canada. It was established in the 38th Canadian Parliament.

== Mandate ==
- The mandate and management of Status of Women Canada and related agencies
- Government policy and actions involving the status of women in society
- Abuse of older women
- Violence against Indigenous women and girls

== Membership ==
As of the 45th Canadian Parliament:

Party	Member	District
Liberal	Marilyn Gladu, chair	Sarnia—Lambton—Bkejwanong, ON
Liberal	Iqra Khalid, vice chair	Mississauga—Erin Mills, ON
Bloc Québécois	Andréanne Larouche, vice chair	Shefford, QC
Liberal	Shaun Chen	Scarborough North, ON
Conservative	Connie Cody	Cambridge, ON
Liberal	Marie-Gabrielle Ménard	Hochelaga—Rosemont-Est, QC
Liberal	Juanita Nathan	Pickering—Brooklin, ON
Conservative	Anna Roberts	King—Vaughan, ON
Conservative	Dominique Vien	Bellechasse—Les Etchemins—Lévis, QC

== Subcommittees ==
- Subcommittee on Agenda and Procedure (SFEW)
