= Ken James (politician) =

Canadian politician

Member of Parliament for Sarnia—Lambton
- In office 1984–1993
- Preceded by: Bud Cullen
- Succeeded by: Roger Gallaway

Personal details
- Born: 5 August 1934 Sarnia, Ontario, Canada
- Died: 24 September 2014 (aged 80) Sarnia, Ontario, Canada
- Party: Progressive Conservative
- Spouse: Mary Ellen James
- Profession: Entrepreneur, Farmer

Kenneth Albert James (5 August 1934 – 24 September 2014) was a Progressive Conservative member of the House of Commons of Canada.

== Biography ==
Born in Sarnia, Ontario, he was a businessman, farmer, marketing and sales manager by career. He attended Michigan State University where he graduated with a Bachelor of Arts in economics.

James served as reeve and councillor for the Township of Sarnia for a decade.

In federal politics, he represented the Ontario riding of Sarnia—Lambton where he was first elected in the 1984 federal election and re-elected in 1988, therefore becoming a member in the 33rd and 34th Canadian Parliament.

James left federal politics after his defeat in the 1993 federal election to Roger Gallaway of the Liberal Party. He served as chair of the Blue Water Bridge Authority from 2007 until 2012. He died on 24 September 2014 at the age of 80.

James' son, Brad James, was an Ontario New Democratic Party candidate in the 2007 Ontario provincial election.

== Electoral record ==
=== Sarnia—Lambton ===
1993 Canadian federal election
| Party | Candidate | Votes | % | ±% |
|---|---|---|---|---|
| Liberal | Roger Gallaway | 20,331 | 47.5% | +15.7% |
| Progressive Conservative | Ken James | 9,706 | 22.7% | -22.4% |
| Reform | Bruce Brogden | 9,061 | 21.2% | |
| New Democratic | Julie Foley | 2,634 | 6.2% | -16.1% |
| Christian Heritage | Louis Duke | 610 | 1.4% | |
| Independent | John Kenneth Elliot | 192 | 0.4% | -0.5% |
| Natural Law | Shannon M. Bourke | 178 | 0.4% | |
| Independent | O'Doug Dell | 68 | 0.2% | |
| Total valid votes | | 42,780 | 100.0% | |

Source: Elections Canada

1988 Canadian federal election
| Party | Candidate | Votes | % | ±% |
|---|---|---|---|---|
| Progressive Conservative | Ken James | 19,304 | 45.0% | -9.6% |
| Liberal | Joe Foreman | 13,624 | 31.8% | +6.1% |
| New Democratic | Julie Foley | 9,525 | 22.2% | +2.8% |
| Rhinoceros | John Elliott | 408 | 1.0% | |
| Total valid votes | | 42,861 | 100.0% | |

Source: Elections Canada

1984 Canadian federal election
| Party | Candidate | Votes | % | ±% |
|---|---|---|---|---|
| Progressive Conservative | Ken James | 24,066 | 54.6% | +19.8% |
| Liberal | Michael Bradley | 11,313 | 25.7% | -14.9% |
| New Democratic | Julie Foley | 8,538 | 19.4% | -5.1% |
| Independent | Douglas O'Dell | 90 | 0.2% | |
| Independent | Fred Kahanek | 51 | 0.1% | |
| Total valid votes | | 44,058 | 100.0% | |

Source: Elections Canada
