= Bud Cullen =

Canadian politician

The Honourable Bud Cullen PC

Member of the Canadian Parliament for Sarnia-Lambton
- In office June 25, 1968 – May 22, 1979
- Preceded by: Electoral District created
- Succeeded by: Bill Campbell

Member of the Canadian Parliament for Sarnia-Lambton
- In office February 18, 1980 – July 26, 1984
- Preceded by: Bill Campbell
- Succeeded by: Ken James

Minister of National Revenue
- In office 1975–1976
- Preceded by: Ron Basford
- Succeeded by: Monique Bégin

Minister of Employment and Immigration
- In office 1976–1979
- Preceded by: Ministry Created
- Succeeded by: Ron Atkey

Judge (Trial Division) Federal Court of Canada
- In office July 26, 1984 – August 31, 2000
- Appointed by: John Turner

Personal details
- Born: John Sydney George Cullen; April 20, 1927 Creighton Mine, Ontario, Canada
- Died: July 5, 2005 (aged 78) Ottawa, Ontario, Canada
- Party: Liberal
- Education: University of Toronto, Osgoode Hall Law School
- Profession: lawyer, politician, judge

Jack Sydney George "Bud" Cullen, PC (April 20, 1927 – July 5, 2005) was a Canadian Federal Court judge and politician.

== Early years ==
Born in Creighton Mine, Ontario, Cullen was given the nickname of Bud by his mother when he was a young boy. Later, he legally changed his name to Bud. Cullen went to Creighton Mine Public School, Lansdowne Public School, and Sudbury High School before attending the University of Toronto and Osgoode Hall Law School.

== Law and politics ==
A lawyer practicing in Sarnia, Ontario, Cullen was first elected to the House of Commons of Canada in the 1968 federal election as the Liberal Member of Parliament for Sarnia.

== Key figure in government ==
In 1971, he became parliamentary secretary to the Minister of National Defence. He subsequently served as parliamentary secretary to the Energy Minister (1972) and to the Finance Minister (1974–1975).

Prime Minister Pierre Trudeau appointed Cullen to the Cabinet as Minister of National Revenue in 1975. Cullen moved to the position of Minister of Manpower and Immigration in 1976, and remained in the position when it was renamed Minister of Employment and Immigration the next year, until the defeat of the Trudeau government in the 1979 election.

== Final days in politics and the judgeship ==
Cullen lost his Sarnia seat in the 1979 election, but regained it in the subsequent 1980 election, but he did not return to Cabinet. Cullen was appointed a judge in the trial division of the Federal Court of Canada by Prime Minister John Turner in July 1984 prior to that year's election, and he remained on the bench until his retirement in August 2000.

== Connection to Sarnia Mayor Bradley ==
Prior to being elected to Sarnia City Council for the first time in the municipal elections of 1985, future Sarnia mayor Mike Bradley got his political feet wet working as an executive assistant for MP Cullen. Bradley even made a run at winning Cullen's seat in 1984 and has described him in a number of interviews as a political role model of his.

== Federal election results ==
=== Sarnia ===
1980 Canadian federal election
Party	Candidate	Votes	%	±%
Liberal	Bud Cullen	16,275	40.6%	+5.9%
Progressive Conservative	Bill Campbell	13,986	34.9%	-5.1%
New Democratic	Wally Krawczyk	9,809	24.4%	-0.9%
Marxist–Leninist	Pedro Villamizar	52	0.1%	
Total valid votes		40,122	100.0%	

Source: Elections Canada

1979 Canadian federal election
Party	Candidate	Votes	%	±%
Progressive Conservative	Bill Campbell	15,990	40.0%	+13.7%
Liberal	Bud Cullen	13,872	34.7%	-22.0%
New Democratic	Wally Krawczyk	10,148	25.4%	+8.3%
Total valid votes		40,010	100.0%	

Source: Elections Canada

=== Sarnia—Lambton ===
1974 Canadian federal election
Party	Candidate	Votes	%	±%
Liberal	Bud Cullen	20,661	56.7%	+13.9%
Progressive Conservative	John Kowalyshyn	9,579	26.3%	-12.6%
New Democratic	Wallace Krawczyk	6,217	17.1%	-1.3%
Total valid votes		36,457	100.0%	

Source: Elections Canada

1972 Canadian federal election
Party	Candidate	Votes	%	±%
Liberal	Bud Cullen	16,112	42.8%	-2.5%
Progressive Conservative	Andy Brandt	14,647	38.9%	-1.1%
New Democratic	David Bell	6,901	18.3%	+3.6%
Total valid votes		37,660	100.0%	

Source: Elections Canada

=== Sarnia ===
1968 Canadian federal election
Party	Candidate	Votes	%
Liberal	Bud Cullen	14,573	45.3%
Progressive Conservative	Dick Ford	12,883	40.0%
New Democratic	Alex Grabove	4,733	14.7%
Total valid votes		32,189	100.0%

Source: Elections Canada

== Archives ==
There is a Jack Cullen fonds at Library and Archives Canada.
