= Marilyn Gladu =

Canadian politician

Marilyn Gladu MP
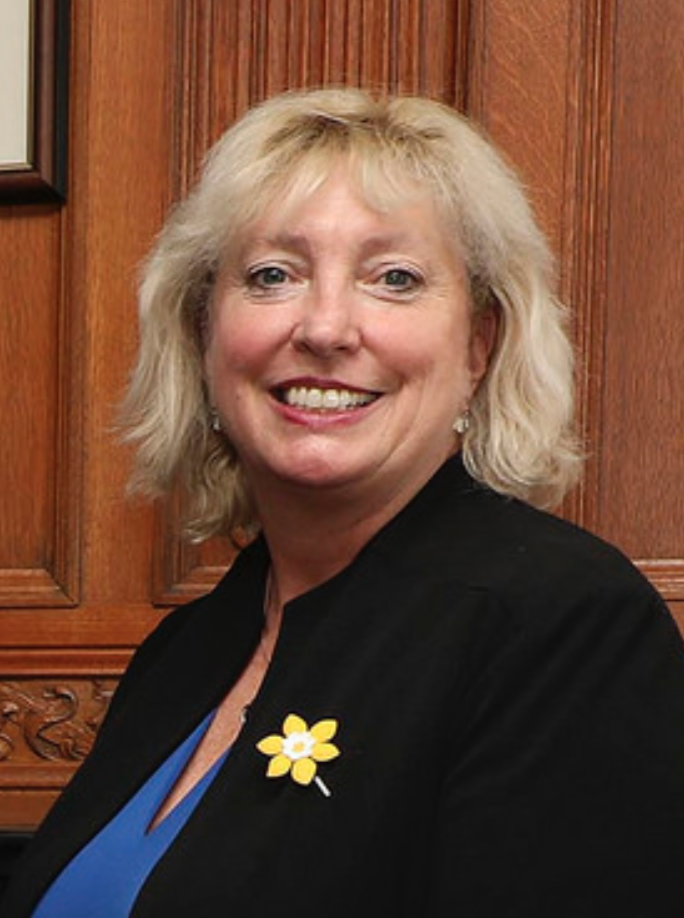
- Gladu in 2018

Member of Parliament for Sarnia—Lambton—Bkejwanong Sarnia—Lambton (2015–2025)
- Incumbent
- Assumed office October 19, 2015
- Preceded by: Pat Davidson

Personal details
- Born: 1962
- Party: Liberal (since 2026)
- Other political affiliations: Conservative (until 2026)
- Education: Queen's University (BSc)
- Profession: Engineer

Marilyn Gladu (born 1962) is a Canadian politician who has been the member of Parliament (MP) for Sarnia—Lambton—Bkejwanong since 2015. Elected as a Conservative, she crossed the floor to the Liberals in April 2026.

== Political career ==
In 2016, Gladu sponsored a private member's bill (C-277), "An Act providing for the development of a framework on palliative care in Canada" which became law in December 2017.

Prior to changing parties, she served as the Official Opposition critic for civil liberties. She previously served as critic for health and as chair of the Standing Committee on the Status of Women from 2016-2017 and 2020-2021. Under the leadership of Rona Ambrose, Gladu was the Official Opposition critic for science.

Gladu was opposed to the Liberal government's plan to legalize cannabis. In the House of Commons, she read a poem urging MPs to "keep our great country safe from all the weed."

In the October 2019 election, she was elected for a second term for the Sarnia—Lambton riding. In January 2020, she declared her intention to run in the 2020 Conservative Party of Canada leadership election. She was unable to obtain enough signatures and raise enough funds to pay the deposit, so her name did not appear on the ballot.

In February 2020, she suggested that the Canadian government should send in the military to end the pipeline protests along railways.

In April 2020, Gladu sparked controversy in an interview with Melanie Irwin of Blackburn Radio by promoting a controversial and unproven treatment for COVID-19. At that time, Gladu referred to the treatment of “hydroxychloroquine, with azithromycin and zinc sulphate” as having a “nearly 100 per cent recovery rate”. Gladu responded to the reports claiming that her "comments were taken out of context and do not accurately represent the full plan needed." Sarnia Mayor Mike Bradley called Gladu's comments "surprising, disappointing and not reflective of what medical experts in Canada and the United States have been saying."

In June 2021, Gladu publicly opposed and voted against Bill C-6, an act that would end the practice of conversion therapy in Canada. In December 2020, Gladu had petitioned the Government to narrow the definition of conversion therapy to exclude pastoral care, voluntary sought counselling, or prayer. The bill passed in the House of Commons, but did not pass in the Senate before the legislative session ended in August 2021 following the dissolution of Parliament for the 2021 federal election. Conservatives subsequently brought a unanimous consent motion to pass the amended conversion therapy bill at all stages in December 2021. The Government's amended bill expanded on the former Bill C-6 to protect all Canadians, regardless of their age, from the harms of conversion therapy practices and to promote the dignity and equality of lesbian, gay, bisexual, transgender, queer and Two-Spirit (LGBTQ2) persons.

In 2022, Gladu introduced Bill C-228, a private member's bill to protect pensioners in cases of company bankruptcy. The bill passed unanimously in the House of Commons and the "Pension Protection Act" received royal assent in April 2023.

In December 2023, Gladu introduced a bill that would declare December to be Christian Heritage Month. The bill died on the order paper at the end of the parliamentary session in January 2025, when the 44th Canadian Parliament was dissolved leading up to the 2025 federal election.

She was again elected chair of the Canadian House of Commons Standing Committee on the Status of Women in the 45th Canadian Parliament in 2025.

On April 8, 2026, Gladu crossed the floor to join the Liberal Party, the fourth Conservative MP to cross the floor to the Liberals during the 45th Canadian Parliament, and fifth MP overall to cross the floor to the Liberals during that parliament.

At the time of the 2025 Canadian federal election, she lived in Camlachie, Ontario.

=== Political positions ===
==== Floor-Crossing ====
In January 2026, Gladu publicly supported House of Commons petition E-7025 which called for Parliament to pass legislation to force a by-election whenever an MP crosses the floor. Gladu stated to her local newspaper "Really, the whole point of being an MP is to represent your constituents. So if they’re voting you in under one platform –for you to switch for whatever reasons, just seems to me to not be representing what you’re supposed to be there to represent... We elected you under this banner, and if you don’t want to be under that banner, then we deserve a chance to have a redo.”

==== Abortion ====
Despite previously voting for mild limits on abortion, Gladu said that she will now vote with the Liberals on any measure related to abortion.

== Awards and recognition ==
In 2016, Gladu was honored by Maclean's as the most collegial MP of 2016: "Increasingly known for her pragmatic approach, the rookie MP for Sarnia–Lambton is a loyal Conservative who consistently works across party lines."

== Electoral record ==
2025 Canadian federal election: Sarnia—Lambton—Bkejwanong
Party	Candidate	Votes	%	±%	Expenditures
Conservative	Marilyn Gladu	40,597	53.15	+6.65	
Liberal	George Vandenberg	28,940	37.89	+18.5	
New Democratic	Lo-Anne Chan	4,088	5.35	−15.64	
People's	Brian Everaert	1,136	1.49	−9.51	
Libertarian	Jacques Y Boudreau	990	1.30	N/A	
Christian Heritage	Mark Lamore	437	0.57	−0.06	
Rhinoceros	Tony Mitchell	201	0.26	N/A	
Total valid votes/expense limit					
Total rejected ballots					
Turnout		76,389	71.72		
Eligible voters		106,509			
Conservative notional hold		Swing			
Source: Elections Canada

2021 Canadian federal election: Sarnia—Lambton
Party	Candidate	Votes	%	±%	Expenditures
Conservative	Marilyn Gladu	26,292	46.2	−3.2	$46,658.07
New Democratic	Adam Kilner	11,990	21.1	−0.7	$18,039.06
Liberal	Lois Nantais	10,975	19.3	−1.5	$39,740.29
People's	Brian Everaert	6,359	11.2	+8.5	$10,571.91
Green	Stephanie Bunko	848	1.5	−2.8	$917.68
Christian Heritage	Tom Laird	435	0.8	−0.1	$7,698.96
Total valid votes/expense limit		56,899	99.4	–	$114,580.42
Total rejected ballots		346	0.6		
Turnout		57,245	67.2		
Eligible voters		85,155			
Conservative hold		Swing		−1.3	
Source: Elections Canada

2019 Canadian federal election: Sarnia—Lambton
Party	Candidate	Votes	%	±%	Expenditures
Conservative	Marilyn Gladu	28,623	49.42	+10.60	$72,937.71
New Democratic	Adam Kilner	12,644	21.83	−9.31	$14,696.37
Liberal	Carmen Lemieux	12,041	20.79	−6.48	none listed
Green	Peter Robert Smith	2,490	4.30	+1.53	$4,385.10
People's	Brian Everaert	1,587	2.74		$0.00
Christian Heritage	Thomas Laird	531	0.92		$13,871.28
Total valid votes/expense limit		57,916	99.31		
Total rejected ballots		400	0.69	+0.23	
Turnout		58,316	68.39	−3.38	
Eligible voters		85,266			
Conservative hold		Swing		+9.96	
Source: Elections Canada

2015 Canadian federal election
Party	Candidate	Votes	%	±%	Expenditures
Conservative	Marilyn Gladu	22,565	38.8	−14.2	–
New Democratic	Jason Wayne McMichael	18,102	31.1	+1.19	–
Liberal	Dave McPhail	15,853	27.3	+13.34	–
Green	Peter Smith	1,605	2.8	+0.28	–
Total valid votes/Expense limit		58,125	100.0		$215,511.48
Total rejected ballots		267	–	–	
Turnout		58,392	72.47	+9.22	
Eligible voters		80,565			
Conservative hold		Swing		−7.70	
Source: Elections Canada
