= Uttoxeter, Ontario =

Uttoxeter
- Community
- Location in Ontario
- Coordinates: 43°01′45″N 82°02′55″W
- Country: Canada
- Province: Ontario
- County: Lambton

Government
  - Federal riding: Sarnia—Lambton
  - Prov. riding: Sarnia—Lambton
- Time zone: UTC-5 (EST)
  - Summer (DST): UTC-4 (EDT)
- Area codes: 519 and 226

Uttoxeter (/juːˈtɒksɪtər/ yoo-TOKS-i-tər) is a small village near Plympton–Wyoming, Ontario, Canada, that at one time had its own post office and some small businesses. It is named after the town of Uttoxeter in the United Kingdom. Most of the village no longer exists, but the name endures as a designation for a dispersed rural community around the original site. The church is now a private residence.

The nearest place of any significance is Plympton–Wyoming, which is 4.4 kilometres (2.7 mi) away. The former town of Forest is 12 km away, while the former village of Wyoming in Plympton–Wyoming is 15 km away.

== History ==
=== Name ===
The village is named after the town of Uttoxeter in England. The name of which most likely means "Wuttuc's homestead on the heath". The village is also referred to as Uttoxeter, Ontario, to avoid confusion.

== Transport ==
Ontario Highway 402 is around 3 kilometres (1.86 mi) to the south of Uttoxeter.

The nearest railway station is Wyoming, which is on the Sarnia–Toronto line and is 11.8 kilometres (7.33 mi) away by road.

The nearest airport is Sarnia Chris Hadfield Airport, which is 23 kilometres (14.29 mi) away.
