= Ontario Disability Employment Network =

ODEN Logo

The Ontario Disability Employment Network is a network of employment service providers who serve people with a disability in Ontario, Canada. The network is known for their involvement within the Mayor's Challenge, which involved Sarnia, Ontario, Mayor Mike Bradley issuing a challenge to all mayors in Ontario to make a point of hiring people who have a disability, and for the creation of their Champions League which honours members of the Ontario business community who promote the hiring of people with a disability.
