= Roger Gallaway =

Canadian politician

The Honourable Roger Gallaway PC

Member of Parliament for Sarnia—Lambton
- In office October 25, 1993 – January 23, 2006
- Preceded by: Ken James
- Succeeded by: Patricia Davidson

Personal details
- Born: May 23, 1948 (age 78) Sarnia, Ontario, Canada
- Party: Liberal
- Education: University of Western Ontario, University of Windsor
- Profession: Lawyer, Mayor

Roger John Gallaway, PC (born May 23, 1948 in Sarnia, Ontario) is a Canadian educator and retired politician. He was a member of the House of Commons of Canada from 1993 to 2006, representing the riding of Sarnia—Lambton for the Liberal Party.

== Early life ==
Gallaway graduated from Sarnia Collegiate Institute and Technical School. He earned a Bachelor of Arts degree from the University of Western Ontario and an LL.B from the University of Windsor. He practiced law before entering political life, and was involved in a variety of community organizations in the Sarnia area. In 1991, he was elected mayor of Point Edward.

== Political career ==
Two years into his tenure as mayor of the small town of Point Edward, Ontario, Gallaway took a shot at federal politics. He was first elected to parliament in the 1993 federal election, defeating Progressive Conservative incumbent Ken James by over 10,000 votes. He was re-elected by similarly large pluralities in the elections of 1997 and 2000, and defeated Conservative candidate Marcel Beaubien by over 5,000 votes in the 2004 election. He was defeated by Conservative Patricia Davidson by over 4,000 votes in the 2006 election. Soon afterwards, Gallaway blamed the Liberals' ouster from Canadian government on the leadership of Paul Martin, and was the first from within the party to call for Martin's resignation as party leader.

He ran for Speaker of the House of Commons of Canada in 1997, and was eliminated on the second ballot.

Gallaway was occasionally labeled a maverick MP in the Liberal Party, particularly in later years, and was a vocal opponent of the federal gun registry for many years, and unsuccessfully attempted to cut off funding for the program in late 2004. Gallaway has also called for government funding to be withdrawn from the Canadian Broadcasting Corporation, and opposed negative option billing by cable companies in the late 1990s.

He also holds socially conservative views on some issues, although he has not emphasized these as strongly as others within the party, such as Tom Wappel and Rose-Marie Ur. Gallaway was an opponent of same-sex marriage and voted against the Civil Marriage Act, which legalized it, in 2005.

He is a personal friend and was a frequent political ally of Senator Anne Cools, and has worked with her to propose reforms to Canada's divorce laws which would have ensured greater custody rights for fathers. In furtherance of these concerns, Gallaway served as co-chair of the Special Joint Committee on Custody and Access, which recommended shared parenting as the norm in its report, For the Sake of the Children, issued in 1998.

From December 2003 to July 2004, Gallaway served as parliamentary secretary to the Leader of the Government in the House of Commons, with special emphasis on democratic reform.

Gallaway is also a musician. He formed the band "True Grit" with several Liberal MPs, including Joe Fontana and future prime minister Jean Chrétien (who played trombone). Gallaway has also appeared in performances with Sarnia/Port Huron's International Symphony, and was the narrator of a "Child's Introduction to the Symphony".

Gallaway supported Bob Rae's unsuccessful bid to become leader of the Liberal Party of Canada in the 2006 Liberal leadership election.

== Recent career ==
Since leaving politics, Gallaway has served as an instructor in international business law at Lambton College. He has also thrown his hat in the ring for the 2010 Point Edward municipal elections, trying to become mayor of the tiny town once again. He faced stiff competition in the race against the incumbent mayor, Dick Kirkland, and veteran councillor, Janice Robson, and he ultimately lost to Kirkland.

== Electoral record ==
=== Point Edward municipal election results (Mayor), 2010 ===
Candidate	Vote	%
Roger Gallaway	361	
Dick Kirkland (X)	433	
Janice Robson	170	
Total Valid Votes	964	

Source: Sarnia Lambton Votes

=== Sarnia—Lambton ===
2006 Canadian federal election
Party	Candidate	Votes	%	±%
Conservative	Pat Davidson	21,841	41.0%	+10.5%
Liberal	Roger Gallaway	17,649	33.1%	-8.8%
New Democratic	Greg Agar	10,673	20.0%	+3.7%
Green	Mike Jacobs	1,712	3.2%	-2.2%
Christian Heritage	Gary DeBoer	1,108	2.1%	-1.7%
Independent	John Elliot	316	0.6%	+0.1%
Total valid votes		53,299	100.0%	

Source: Elections Canada

2004 Canadian federal election
Party	Candidate	Votes	%	±%
Liberal	Roger Gallaway	19,932	41.9%	+38.3%
Conservative	Marcel Beaubien	14,500	30.5%	-7.9%
New Democratic	Greg Agar	7,764	16.3%	+9.1%
Green	Anthony Cramer	2,548	5.4%	+4.0%
Christian Heritage	Gary DeBoer	1,819	3.8%	
Independent	Dave Core	749	1.6%	
Independent	John Elliot	229	0.5%	0.0%
Total valid votes		47,541	100.0%	

Note: Conservative vote is compared to the total of the Canadian Alliance vote and Progressive Conservative vote in 2000 election.

Source: Elections Canada

2000 Canadian federal election
Party	Candidate	Votes	%	±%
Liberal	Roger Gallaway	19 329	51.0%	+3.6%
Alliance	Dave Christie	11 208	29.6%	+4.9%
Progressive Conservative	Paul Bailey	3 320	8.8%	-5.8%
New Democratic	Glenn Sonier	2 735	7.2%	-0.9%
Green	Allan McKeown	514	1.4%	
Independent	Ed Banninga	356	0.9%	
Independent	John Elliott	189	0.5%	-0.5%
Canadian Action	Rene Phillion	145	0.4%	0.0%
Natural Law	Shannon Bourke	92	0.2%	-0.1%
Marxist–Leninist	Andre C. Vachon	32	0.1%	0.1%
Total valid votes		37,920	100.0%	

Note: Canadian Alliance vote is compared to the Reform vote in 1997 election.

Source: Elections Canada

1997 Canadian federal election
Party	Candidate	Votes	%	±%
Liberal	Roger Gallaway	19,494	47.4%	-0.2%
Reform	Dave Christie	10,172	24.7%	+3.5%
Progressive Conservative	Dick Carpani	6,008	14.6%	-8.1%
New Democratic	Phil Gamester	3,320	8.1%	+1.9%
Christian Heritage	Paul Van Oosten	1,472	3.6%	+2.1%
Independent	John Elliott	402	1.0%	+0.5%
Canadian Action	Philip G. Holley	175	0.4%	
Natural Law	Shannon Bourke	125	0.3%	-0.1%
Total valid votes		41,168	100.0%	

Source: Elections Canada

1993 Canadian federal election
Party	Candidate	Votes	%	±%
Liberal	Roger Gallaway	20,331	47.5%	+15.7%
Progressive Conservative	Ken James	9,706	22.7%	-22.4%
Reform	Bruce Brogden	9,061	21.2%	
New Democratic	Julie Foley	2,634	6.2%	-16.1%
Christian Heritage	Louis Duke	610	1.4%	
Independent	John Kenneth Elliot	192	0.4%	-0.5%
Natural Law	Shannon M. Bourke	178	0.4%	
Independent	O'Doug Dell	68	0.2%	
Total valid votes		42,780	100.0%	

Source: Elections Canada
