= St. Patrick's Catholic High School =

Location
- 1001 The Rapids Parkway; Sarnia, Ontario; Canada; 42.9949°N 82.3518°W

Information
- School type: Public, Separate high school
- Motto: Esse quam videri (To be rather than to seem)
- Religious affiliation: Catholic
- Founded: 1935; 91 years ago
- School board: St. Clair Catholic District School Board
- Superintendent: Scott Johnson
- Director: Chris Kehoe
- Principal: Daniella Mancusi
- Grades: 9 to 12x
- Enrollment: 1500+
- Language: English
- Colours: Green and Gold
- Team name: Fighting Irish
- Website: sph.sccdsb.net

St. Patrick's Catholic High School, frequently called St. Pat's, is a Catholic secondary school located in Sarnia, Ontario, Canada. It is one of two secondary schools in the St. Clair Catholic District School Board, and the only one located in Sarnia. In 2013 the school was merged with St. Christopher's Secondary School resulting in a population of over 1300 students.

St. Pat's is well known for its Irish Miracle and Cyclone Aid food drive which collects thousands of bags of non-perishable food items for local charities each year.

== History ==
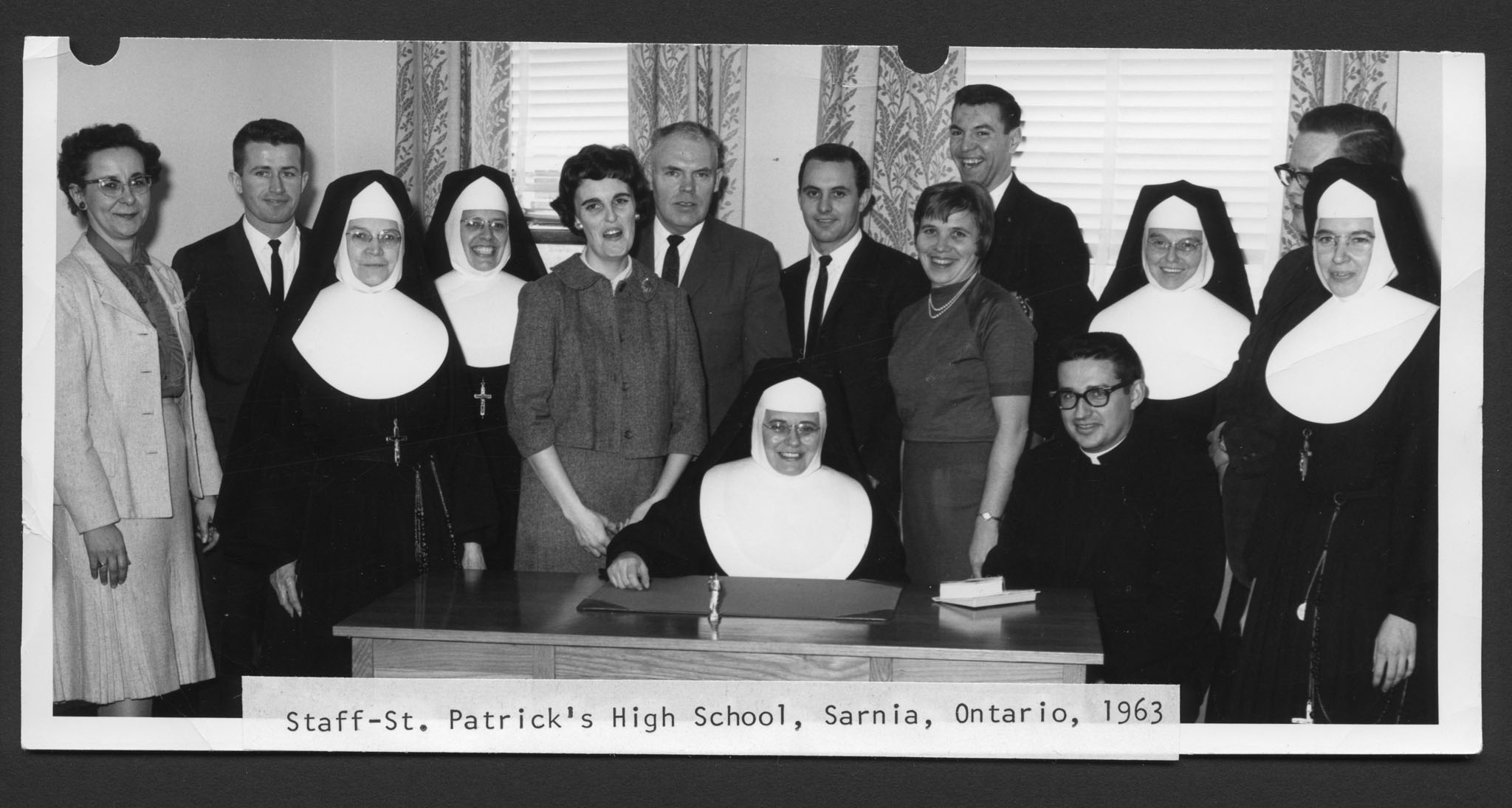

St. Pat's was founded in 1935, initially as a branch of Our Lady of Mercy School before relocating to its own building.

From 1986 to 2013, the school was located at the East Street Campus, on East Street and London Road.

In 2006, a legal challenge to the school's use of a sniffer dog for a drug search reached the Supreme Court of Canada. A majority of justices ruled this to be a violation of Charter of Rights and Freedoms in R v AM.

In 2009 the school celebrated 75 years with both alumni and students.

In 1996, St. Pats was joined by a new Catholic secondary school, St. Christopher's Secondary School. The two schools operated in Sarnia from 1996 to 2013.

After the 2012–13 school year, St. Pats and St. Christopher's were amalgamated. The newly merged school retained its mascot and name from St. Pat's due to its much longer history, while adopting the combined colours green and blue from St. Christopher's. For the 2013–14 school year, St. Christopher students moved to the East Street site, while the former St. Christopher's campus was renovated to add an extra 80,000 square feet to the pre-existing building. The school moved to the enlarged St. Christopher's campus for the 2014-15 year onward. The former St. Pats campus on East Street was demolished by 2017 and the lot remains vacant. In 2025, as part of the schools 90th anniversary the school has changed the official colours back to green and gold. Also, the original pugilist mascot is coming back.

In November 2020, during disruptions to extracurricular activities caused by the COVID-19 pandemic, St. Patrick's students organized an in-school Rocket League esports tournament. The event was organized by ten Grade 11 communications technology students with teacher Robert Walicki and attracted nearly 100 student participants. Matches were played during lunch periods and livestreamed through a student-created website with commentary and other broadcast elements. Students Tiago Campos, Logan Lambert and Colin Wilson were interviewed by the Sarnia Observer about the organization of the event. The tournament final, held on November 13, partially replaced the school's traditional homecoming celebrations and included a national anthem, halftime show, and pre- and post-game interviews. This tournament was won by 12th grade student, Liam Kutz.

== Notable people ==
- Derek Drouin, High jumper, Olympic gold medalist, NCAA champion
- Kate Drummond
- Phil Esposito, NHL hockey player

== See also ==
- List of high schools in Ontario
- Ursuline College Chatham
