= Marceil Saddy =

64th Mayor of Sarnia
- In office 1980 – March 7, 1988
- Preceded by: Andy Brandt
- Succeeded by: Ron Gordon (interim)

Personal details
- Died: March 7, 1988
- Profession: Journalist

Marceil Saddy (died March 7, 1988) was a Canadian politician, who served as mayor of Sarnia, Ontario from 1980 until his death in 1988. Prior to becoming the city's mayor, he was a journalist and editor of the Sarnia Gazette.

Saddy was particularly noted for his role in a boundary dispute between Sarnia and the then-separate township of Clearwater, which he dismissed as "an overblown suburb of 24,000 people." Clearwater was later annexed by the city in 1991. His other achievements in office include the establishment of the Sarnia Community Foundation and the creation of Sarnia's annual Mayor's Honour List.

Following Saddy's death in office in 1988, councillor Ron Gordon was appointed interim mayor of the city. Gordon ran for election to the mayoralty in that year's municipal election, but was defeated by Mike Bradley.

Saddy made several bequests to the city in his will, including money earmarked to have the mayor's chain of office refurbished and the donation of his home, a historic property built by Alexander Mackenzie for the family of prominent Sarnia businessman James Rogers in 1861, to the Sarnia Community Foundation. As well, he endowed a bursary fund for journalism students at the University of Western Ontario.
