= Patricia Davidson (Canadian politician) =

Canadian politician

Patricia A. Davidson

Member of Parliament for Sarnia—Lambton
- In office January 23, 2006 – October 19, 2015
- Preceded by: Roger Gallaway
- Succeeded by: Marilyn Gladu

Personal details
- Born: June 30, 1946 (age 80) Petrolia, Ontario, Canada
- Party: Conservative
- Spouse: Bill Davidson
- Profession: Municipal politician

Patricia A. Davidson (born June 30, 1946, in Petrolia, Ontario) is a former member of the House of Commons of Canada from 2006 until 2015 representing the riding of Sarnia—Lambton and is a member of the Conservative Party of Canada.

== Biography ==
Davidson previously served as mayor of Wyoming (1991–2000) and Plympton-Wyoming, Ontario (2001–2006) and warden of Lambton County. She first won her seat in the 2006 federal election by defeating incumbent Liberal Roger Gallaway by more than 4,000 votes. Davidson has publicly declared her opposition to the Canadian asbestos industry, which put her in disagreement with her party and then-Prime Minister Stephen Harper. Davidson was re-elected on May 2, 2011. She did not stand in the October 19, 2015 election.

She is married to Bill Davidson and has one son.

== Electoral record ==
=== Sarnia—Lambton ===
2011 Canadian federal election: Sarnia—Lambton (federal electoral district)
Party	Candidate	Votes	%	±%	Expenditures
Conservative	Pat Davidson	26,112	52.6%	+2.6%	–
New Democratic	Brian White	14,856	29.9%	+8.3%	–
Liberal	Tim Fugard	6,931	14.0%	-6.3%	–
Green	Timothy van Bodegom	1,252	2.5%	-1.1%	–
Christian Heritage	Christopher Desormeaux-Malm	514	1.0%	-0.2%	–
Total valid votes		49,665	100.0%	–	

Source: Elections Canada

2008 Canadian federal election: Sarnia—Lambton (federal electoral district)
Party	Candidate	Votes	%	±%	Expenditures
Conservative	Pat Davidson	23,008	49.8%	+8.8%	$57,939
New Democratic	Andy Bruziewicz	10,122	21.9%	+1.9%	$15,499
Liberal	Tim Fugard	9,281	20.1%	-23.0%	$29,860
Green	Allan McKeown	3,184	6.9%	+3.6%	$9,315
Christian Heritage	Christopher Desormeaux-Malm	546	1.1%	+0.5%	$5,676
Total valid votes/Expense limit		46,141	100.0%	$85,252	
Turnout		–	%		

Source: Elections Canada

2006 Canadian federal election: Sarnia—Lambton (federal electoral district)
Party	Candidate	Votes	%	±%
Conservative	Pat Davidson	21,841	41.0%	+10.5%
Liberal	Roger Gallaway	17,649	33.1%	-8.8%
New Democratic	Greg Agar	10,673	20.0%	+3.7%
Green	Mike Jacobs	1,712	3.2%	-2.2%
Christian Heritage	Gary DeBoer	1,108	2.1%	-1.7%
Independent	John Elliot	316	0.6%	+0.1%
Total valid votes		53,299	100.0%	

Source: Elections Canada
