= Ursuline College Chatham =

Ursuline College Chatham Catholic Secondary School

Location
- 85 Grand Avenue West; Chatham, Ontario, N7L 1B6; Canada
- Coordinates: 42°24′25″N 82°11′40″W

Information
- School type: Public, Separate high school
- Motto: Fides, Spes, Caritas (Faith, Hope, Charity)
- Religious affiliation: Roman Catholic
- Founded: 1860
- School board: St. Clair Catholic District School Board
- Principal: Lisa Harnarine
- Grades: 9 to 12x
- Enrollment: 1,300+ (2024/2025)
- Language: English, French
- Colours: Blue and White
- Mascot: Lance
- Team name: Lancers
- Website: ucc.sccdsb.net

Ursuline College Chatham Catholic Secondary School, commonly shortened to Ursuline College Chatham (UCC), is a Catholic secondary school in Chatham-Kent, Ontario, Canada. The secondary school offers both English and French immersion. Among a student community of about 1350, it is the biggest Catholic secondary school in Chatham-Kent.

== See also ==
- Education in Ontario
- List of secondary schools in Ontario
