= Plympton–Wyoming =

- Town (lower-tier)
- Town of Plympton–Wyoming
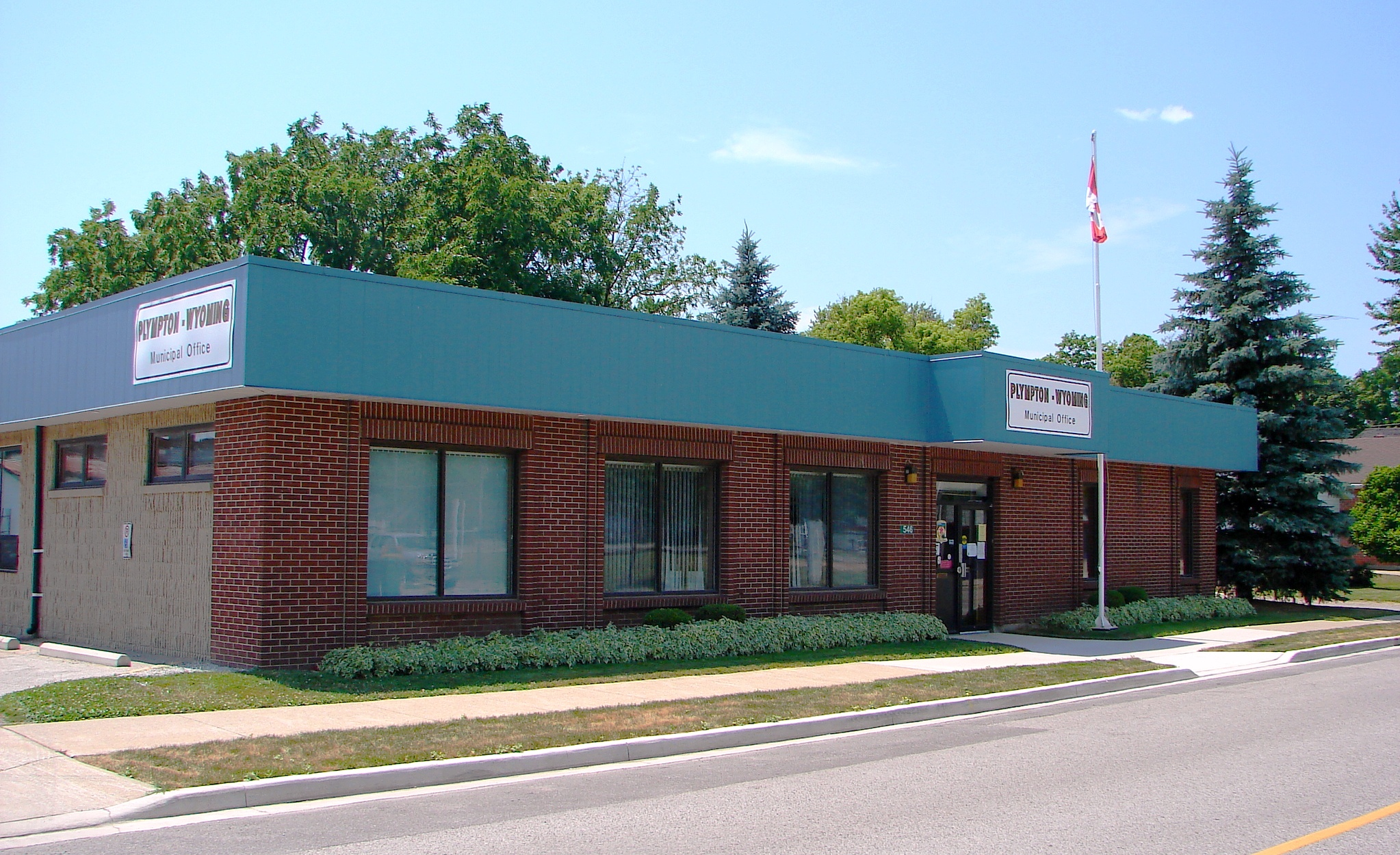
- Plympton–Wyoming municipal office
- Nickname: The Hub of Lambton County
- Location within Lambton County Location within Southern Ontario
- Coordinates: 43°01′N 82°05′W
- Country: Canada
- Province: Ontario
- County: Lambton
- Formed: 2001

Government
  - Mayor: Gary Atkinson
  - Federal riding: Sarnia—Lambton—Bkejwanong
  - Prov. riding: Sarnia—Lambton

Area
  - Land: 318.78 km^{2} (123.08 sq mi)

Population (2016)
  - Total: 7,576
  - Density: 23.8/km^{2} (62/sq mi)
- Time zone: UTC-5 (EST)
  - Summer (DST): UTC-4 (EDT)
- Postal code: N0N 1T0
- Area codes: 519 ,226 and 548
- Website: plympton-wyoming.com

Plympton–Wyoming is a town in the Canadian province of Ontario, located in Lambton County immediately east of Sarnia. It is the seat of the Lambton County Council.

The name Wyoming derives from the Munsee name xwé:wamənk, meaning 'at the big river flat'. Plympton is named after Plympton in Devon, England.

== History ==
The town was created in 2001, amalgamating the Township of Plympton with the formerly independent Village of Wyoming.

The township of Plympton was established in 1833 by settlers under the patronage of Lord Egremont, at roughly the same time as the settlement of Camlachie, Ontario.

The pre-amalgamation Village of Plympton was a party to a Supreme Court of Canada case in 1980, Homex Realty and Development v. Wyoming, which addressed issues of procedural fairness with regard to the village's municipal bylaws regarding property transfer.

On May 2, 1983, an F4 tornado tore through the town, injuring 12 and levelling / sweeping away multiple houses leaving dozens homeless. It tracked for 30 km (19 mi) and had a peak width of 400 m (1,300 ft). Winds topped out at an estimated 400 km/h (250 mph).

== Communities ==
The main population centre is Wyoming. The town also comprises the communities of Aberarder, Beverly Glen, Blue Point, Blue Point Bay, Bonnie Doone, Camlachie, Errol, Gallimere Beach, Hillsborough Beach, Huron Heights, Kennedy Acres, Kertch, Mandaumin, Reece's Corners, Uttoxeter, Wanstead and Wellington Beach.

The town has three public schools, Errol Village Public School, Aberarder Central School, and Plympton–Wyoming Public School. The town has one Catholic separate school, Holy Rosary Catholic School. The town has one private Christian School, Wyoming John Knox Christian School, operating since the 1950s, with a school being built in 1958; the school is associated with the Christian Reformed tradition and with Edvance, an Ontario network of Christian schools. The area has no secondary schools, with different areas falling into the catchment areas for other local secondary schools such as North Lambton Secondary School, Lambton Central Collegiate Vocational Institute, St. Patrick's Catholic High School, and Northern Collegiate Institute and Vocational School.

The area has at least eight documented places of worship, including two United churches, a United Reformed Churches in North America affiliated church, an Associated Gospel Churches of Canada affiliated church, an Anglican Church, a Canadian Baptists of Ontario and Quebec church and a Christian Reformed Church in North America church. Wyoming's Catholic church closed in June 2007 in a parish reorganization by the Diocese of London.

== Industry and recreation ==
The Town of Wyoming has a mix of industry, with light manufacturing including approximately 100 employed in publishing and 25 in grain processing.

The village of Camlachie is home to two golf courses, serving in part more affluent communities on the Lake Huron shoreline.

== Government ==
The town's first mayor was Patricia Davidson, who was elected to the House of Commons of Canada in the 2006 federal election as the Conservative Member of Parliament for Sarnia—Lambton. Davidson also served as mayor of the village of Wyoming for ten years prior to her election as mayor of the amalgamated town. Davidson was succeeded as mayor by former town councilor and deputy mayor Lonny Napper in March 2006. The township is governed by a seven-member Council, including a Mayor and Deputy Mayor. In 2022, Mayor Gary Atkinson was elected, winning over Tim Wilkins.

== Demographics ==
Historical population
Year	Pop.	±%
1996	7,344	—
2001	7,359	+0.2%
2006	7,506	+2.0%
2011	7,576	+0.9%
2016	7,795	+2.9%

In the 2021 Census of Population conducted by Statistics Canada, Plympton–Wyoming had a population of 8,308 living in 3,172 of its 3,513 total private dwellings, a change of 6.6% from its 2016 population of 7,795. With a land area of 318.86 km^{2} (123.11 sq mi), it had a population density of 26.1/km^{2} (67.5/sq mi) in 2021.

Canada census – Plympton-Wyoming community profile

	2021	2016	2011
Population	8,308 (+6.6% from 2016)	7,795 (+2.9% from 2011)	7,576 (+0.9% from 2006)
Land area	318.86 km^{2} (123.11 sq mi)	318.78 km^{2} (123.08 sq mi)	318.76 km^{2} (123.07 sq mi)
Population density	26.1/km^{2} (68/sq mi)	24.5/km^{2} (63/sq mi)	23.8/km^{2} (62/sq mi)
Median age	45.6 (M: 44.8, F: 46.4)	45.6 (M: 45.2, F: 46.1)	44.1 (M: 43.4, F: 44.7)
Private dwellings	3,175 (total)	3,416 (total)	3,148 (total)
Median household income		$91,451

References: 2021 2016 2011

Populations prior to amalgamation (2001):

- Population in 1941
  - Plympton (township): 2,595
  - Wyoming (village): 518
- Population total in 1996: 7,344
  - Plympton (township): 5,247
  - Wyoming (village): 2,131
- Population in 1991:
  - Plympton (township): 5,275
  - Wyoming (village): 2,071

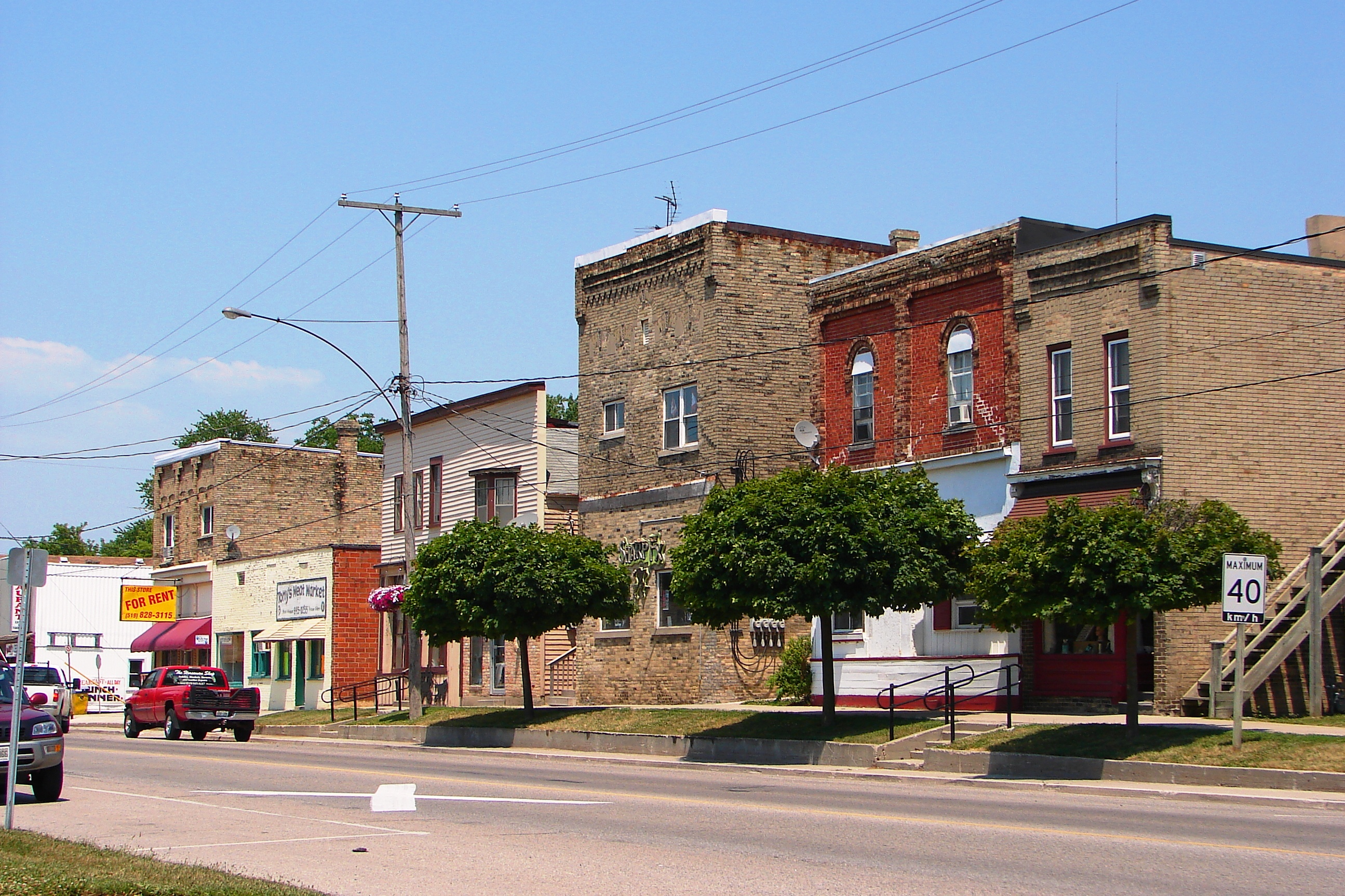
Wyoming

== See also ==
- List of townships in Ontario
- Wyoming railway station (Ontario)
