= Sarnia—Lambton—Bkejwanong =

Federal electoral district in Ontario, Canada

Coordinates: 42.91°N 82.15°W

Ontario electoral district
- Interactive map of riding boundaries

Federal electoral district
- Legislature: House of Commons
MP
Marilyn Gladu
Liberal
- District created: 1976
- First contested: 1979
- Last contested: 2025
- District webpage: profile, map

Demographics
- Population (2016): 105,337
- Electors (2015): 80,029
- Area (km²): 1,568
- Pop. density (per km²): 67.2
- Census division: Lambton County
- Census subdivision(s): Sarnia, St. Clair, Lambton Shores, Plympton–Wyoming, Petrolia, Warwick, Enniskillen, Brooke-Alvinston, Dawn-Euphemia, Point Edward

Sarnia—Lambton—Bkejwanong (pronounced SAR-nee-a-LAMP-tun-bu-KEZH-wa-nong, formerly known as Sarnia—Lambton) is a federal electoral district in Ontario, Canada, that has been represented in the House of Commons of Canada since 1968. It is located in the area of the city of Sarnia, in the southwest corner of the province of Ontario.

Until 2015, Sarnia—Lambton, with its predecessors Sarnia, and Lambton West, was Canada's most bellwetherly riding, having voted for the winning party from 1963 to 2011.

== Demographics ==
According to the 2021 Canadian census

Ethnic groups: 88.0% White, 5.6% Indigenous, 1.9% South Asian, 1.3% Black
Languages: 90.0% English, 1.8% French
Religions: 58.1% Christian (23.9% Catholic, 8.8% United Church, 5.0% Anglican, 2.9% Presbyterian, 2.8% Baptist, 1.5% Pentecostal, 1.0% Reformed, 12.3% other), 39.0% none
Median income: $42,800 (2020)
Average income: $55,500 (2020)

== History ==
It was created as Sarnia electoral district in 1966 from parts of Lambton West riding. It consisted of that part of the County of Lambton contained in the City of Sarnia and the Townships of Moore, Sarnia and Plympton excepting the Town of Forest.

In 1970, the name of the electoral district was changed to Sarnia—Lambton.

It was abolished in 1976 when it was redistributed between Lambton—Middlesex and a new Sarnia riding. The new Sarnia riding consisted of that part of the County of Lambton contained in the City of Sarnia, the Townships of Moore and Sarnia, the Village of Point Edward, and Indian Reserve No. 45.

The name of this electoral district was changed in 1981 to Sarnia—Lambton again.

In 1996, the riding was redefined to include the City of Sarnia and the township of Sombra. The former township of Sarnia was merged with the City of Sarnia on January 1, 1991.

In 2003, it was redefined to consist of that part of the County of Lambton comprising the City of Sarnia, the towns of Petrolia and Plympton-Wyoming, the villages of Oil Springs and Point Edward, the townships of Enniskillen and St. Clair, and Sarnia Indian Reserve No. 45.

This riding was left unchanged after the 2012 electoral redistribution.

Under the 2022 Canadian federal electoral redistribution the riding was renamed Sarnia—Lambton—Bkejwanong. Bkejwanong is the Anishinaabemowin name for Walpole Island, the home of the Walpole Island First Nation, a part of the riding.

It was proposed that the riding's name revert to Sarnia—Lambton as part of Bill C-25 of the 45th Canadian Parliament. The change was removed after the first reading.

=== Members of Parliament ===
Parliament	Years	Member	Party
Sarnia; Riding created from Lambton West
28th	1968–1972	Bud Cullen	Liberal
Sarnia—Lambton
29th	1972–1974	Bud Cullen	Liberal
30th	1974–1979	Bud Cullen	Liberal
Sarnia
31st	1979–1980	Bill Campbell	Progressive Conservative
32nd	1980–1984	Bud Cullen	Liberal
Sarnia—Lambton
33rd	1984–1988	Ken James	Progressive Conservative
34th	1988–1993	Ken James	Progressive Conservative
35th	1993–1997	Roger Gallaway	Liberal
36th	1997–2000	Roger Gallaway	Liberal
37th	2000–2004	Roger Gallaway	Liberal
38th	2004–2006	Roger Gallaway	Liberal
39th	2006–2008	Pat Davidson	Conservative
40th	2008–2011	Pat Davidson	Conservative
41st	2011–2015	Pat Davidson	Conservative
42nd	2015–2019	Marilyn Gladu	Conservative
43rd	2019–2021	Marilyn Gladu	Conservative
44th	2021–2025	Marilyn Gladu	Conservative
Sarnia—Lambton—Bkejwanong
45th	2025–2026	Marilyn Gladu	Conservative
45th	2026–present	Marilyn Gladu	Liberal

== Election results ==
Graph of election results in Sarnia—Lambton (minor parties that never got 2% of the vote or didn't run consistently are omitted)

=== Sarnia—Lambton—Bkejwanong ===
2025 Canadian federal election
Party	Candidate	Votes	%	±%	Expenditures
Conservative	Marilyn Gladu	40,597	53.15	+6.65	
Liberal	George Vandenberg	28,940	37.89	+18.5	
New Democratic	Lo-Anne Chan	4,088	5.35	−15.64	
People's	Brian Everaert	1,136	1.49	−9.51	
Libertarian	Jacques Y Boudreau	990	1.30	N/A	
Christian Heritage	Mark Lamore	437	0.57	−0.06	
Rhinoceros	Tony Mitchell	201	0.26	N/A	
Total valid votes/expense limit					
Total rejected ballots					
Turnout		76,389	71.72		
Eligible voters		106,509			
Conservative notional hold		Swing			
Source: Elections Canada

2021 federal election redistributed results
Party	Vote	%
Conservative	32,196	46.50
New Democratic	14,534	20.99
Liberal	13,421	19.39
People's	7,615	11.00
Green	1,031	1.49
Others	435	0.63

=== Sarnia—Lambton ===
2021 Canadian federal election: Sarnia—Lambton
Party	Candidate	Votes	%	±%	Expenditures
Conservative	Marilyn Gladu	26,292	46.2	−3.2	$46,658.07
New Democratic	Adam Kilner	11,990	21.1	−0.7	$18,039.06
Liberal	Lois Nantais	10,975	19.3	−1.5	$39,740.29
People's	Brian Everaert	6,359	11.2	+8.5	$10,571.91
Green	Stephanie Bunko	848	1.5	−2.8	$917.68
Christian Heritage	Tom Laird	435	0.8	−0.1	$7,698.96
Total valid votes/expense limit		56,899	99.4	–	$114,580.42
Total rejected ballots		346	0.6		
Turnout		57,245	67.2		
Eligible voters		85,155			
Conservative hold		Swing		−1.3	
Source: Elections Canada

2019 Canadian federal election: Sarnia—Lambton
Party	Candidate	Votes	%	±%	Expenditures
Conservative	Marilyn Gladu	28,623	49.42	+10.60	$72,937.71
New Democratic	Adam Kilner	12,644	21.83	−9.31	$14,696.37
Liberal	Carmen Lemieux	12,041	20.79	−6.48	none listed
Green	Peter Robert Smith	2,490	4.30	+1.53	$4,385.10
People's	Brian Everaert	1,587	2.74		$0.00
Christian Heritage	Thomas Laird	531	0.92		$13,871.28
Total valid votes/expense limit		57,916	99.31		
Total rejected ballots		400	0.69	+0.23	
Turnout		58,316	68.39	−3.38	
Eligible voters		85,266			
Conservative hold		Swing		+9.96	
Source: Elections Canada

2015 Canadian federal election
Party	Candidate	Votes	%	±%	Expenditures
Conservative	Marilyn Gladu	22,565	38.82	-13.75	$106,570.00
New Democratic	Jason Wayne McMichael	18,102	31.14	+1.23	$79,797.05
Liberal	Dave McPhail	15,853	27.27	+13.32	$66,577.19
Green	Peter Smith	1,605	2.76	+0.24	$5,020.87
Total valid votes/expense limit		58,125	99.54		$215,882.55
Total rejected ballots		267	0.46	+0.05	
Turnout		58,392	71.77	+9.19	
Eligible voters		81,362			
Conservative hold		Swing		-7.49	
Source: Elections Canada

2011 Canadian federal election
Party	Candidate	Votes	%	±%	Expenditures
Conservative	Pat Davidson	26,112	52.58	+2.58	–
New Democratic	Brian White	14,856	29.91	+8.28	–
Liberal	Tim Fugard	6,931	13.96	-6.31	–
Green	Timothy van Bodegom	1,252	2.52	-4.38	–
Christian Heritage	Christopher Desormeaux-Malm	514	1.03	-0.14	–
Total valid votes/expense limit		49,665	99.59		
Total rejected ballots		205	0.41	+0.02	
Turnout		49,870	62.58	+3.91	
Eligible voters		79,688	–	–	

2008 Canadian federal election
Party	Candidate	Votes	%	±%	Expenditures
Conservative	Pat Davidson	23,195	50.00	+9.03	$57,939
New Democratic	Andy Bruziewicz	10,037	21.63	+1.61	$15,499
Liberal	Tim Fugard	9,404	20.27	-12.84	$29,860
Green	Allan McKeown	3,201	6.9	+3.69	$9,315
Christian Heritage	Christopher Desormeaux-Malm	545	1.17	+0.90	$5,676
Total valid votes/expense limit		46,382	100.00	$85,252	
Total rejected ballots		180	0.39	-0.09	
Turnout		46,562	58.66	-9.21	
Eligible voters		79,371	–	–	

2006 Canadian federal election
Party	Candidate	Votes	%	±%
Conservative	Pat Davidson	21,841	40.97	+10.5
Liberal	Roger Gallaway	17,649	33.11	-8.8
New Democratic	Greg Agar	10,673	20.02	+3.7
Green	Mike Jacobs	1,712	3.21	-2.2
Christian Heritage	Gary DeBoer	1,108	2.07	-1.7
Independent	John Elliot	316	0.59	+0.1
Total valid votes		53,299	100.00	
Total rejected ballots		257	0.48	–
Turnout		53,556	67.87	–
Eligible voters		78,909	–	–

2004 Canadian federal election
Party	Candidate	Votes	%	±%
Liberal	Roger Gallaway	19,932	41.9	+38.3
Conservative	Marcel Beaubien	14,500	30.5	-7.9
New Democratic	Greg Agar	7,764	16.3	+9.1
Green	Anthony Cramer	2,548	5.4	+4.0
Christian Heritage	Gary DeBoer	1,819	3.8	
Independent	Dave Core	749	1.6	
Independent	John Elliot	229	0.5	0.0
Total valid votes		47,541	100.0	

Note: Conservative vote is compared to the total of the Canadian Alliance vote and Progressive Conservative vote in 2000 election.

2000 Canadian federal election
Party	Candidate	Votes	%	±%
Liberal	Roger Gallaway	19 329	51.0	+3.6
Alliance	Dave Christie	11 208	29.6	+4.9
Progressive Conservative	Paul Bailey	3 320	8.8	-5.8
New Democratic	Glenn Sonier	2 735	7.2	-0.9
Green	Allan McKeown	514	1.4	
Independent	Ed Banninga	356	0.9	
Independent	John Elliott	189	0.5	-0.5
Canadian Action	Rene Phillion	145	0.4	0.0
Natural Law	Shannon Bourke	92	0.2	-0.1
Marxist–Leninist	Andre C. Vachon	32	0.1	0.1
Total valid votes		37,920	100.0	

Note: Canadian Alliance vote is compared to the Reform vote in 1997 election.

1997 Canadian federal election
Party	Candidate	Votes	%	±%
Liberal	Roger Gallaway	19,494	47.4	-0.2
Reform	Dave Christie	10,172	24.7	+3.5
Progressive Conservative	Dick Carpani	6,008	14.6	-8.1
New Democratic	Phil Gamester	3,320	8.1	+1.9
Christian Heritage	Paul Van Oosten	1,472	3.6	+2.1
Independent	John Elliott	402	1.0	+0.5
Canadian Action	Philip G. Holley	175	0.4	
Natural Law	Shannon Bourke	125	0.3	-0.1
Total valid votes		41,168	100.0	

1993 Canadian federal election
Party	Candidate	Votes	%	±%
Liberal	Roger Gallaway	20,331	47.5	+15.7
Progressive Conservative	Ken James	9,706	22.7	-22.4
Reform	Bruce Brogden	9,061	21.2	
New Democratic	Julie Foley	2,634	6.2	-16.1
Christian Heritage	Louis Duke	610	1.4	
Independent	John Kenneth Elliot	192	0.4	-0.5
Natural Law	Shannon M. Bourke	178	0.4	
Independent	O'Doug Dell	68	0.2	
Total valid votes		42,780	100.0	

1988 Canadian federal election
Party	Candidate	Votes	%	±%
Progressive Conservative	Ken James	19,304	45.0	-9.6
Liberal	Joe Foreman	13,624	31.8	+6.1
New Democratic	Julie Foley	9,525	22.2	+2.8
Rhinoceros	John Elliott	408	1.0	
Total valid votes		42,861	100.0	

1984 Canadian federal election
Party	Candidate	Votes	%	±%
Progressive Conservative	Ken James	24,066	54.6	+19.8
Liberal	Michael Bradley	11,313	25.7	-14.9
New Democratic	Julie Foley	8,538	19.4	-5.1
Independent	Douglas O'Dell	90	0.2	
Independent	Fred Kahanek	51	0.1	
Total valid votes		44,058	100.0	

=== Sarnia ===
1980 Canadian federal election
Party	Candidate	Votes	%	±%
Liberal	Bud Cullen	16,275	40.6	+5.9
Progressive Conservative	Bill Campbell	13,986	34.9	-5.1
New Democratic	Wally Krawczyk	9,809	24.4	-0.9
Marxist–Leninist	Pedro Villamizar	52	0.1	
Total valid votes		40,122	100.0	

1979 Canadian federal election
Party	Candidate	Votes	%	±%
Progressive Conservative	Bill Campbell	15,990	40.0	+13.7
Liberal	Bud Cullen	13,872	34.7	-22.0
New Democratic	Wally Krawczyk	10,148	25.4	+8.3
Total valid votes		40,010	100.0	

=== Sarnia—Lambton ===
1974 Canadian federal election
Party	Candidate	Votes	%	±%
Liberal	Bud Cullen	20,661	56.2	+13.9
Progressive Conservative	John Kowalyshyn	9,579	26.0	-12.6
New Democratic	Wallace Krawczyk	6,217	16.9	-1.3
Ind	Ralph P. Hermann	329	0.9	
Total valid votes		36,786	100.0	

1972 Canadian federal election
Party	Candidate	Votes	%	±%
Liberal	Bud Cullen	16,112	42.8	-2.5
Progressive Conservative	Andy Brandt	14,647	38.9	-1.1
New Democratic	David Bell	6,901	18.3	+3.6
Total valid votes		37,660	100.0	

=== Sarnia ===
1968 Canadian federal election
Party	Candidate	Votes	%
Liberal	Jack Sydney George Cullen	14,573	45.3
Progressive Conservative	Dick Ford	12,883	40.0
New Democratic	Alex Grabove	4,733	14.7
Total valid votes		32,189	100.0

== See also ==
- List of Canadian electoral districts
- Historical federal electoral districts of Canada
