= Mike Bradley (politician) =

Canadian politician

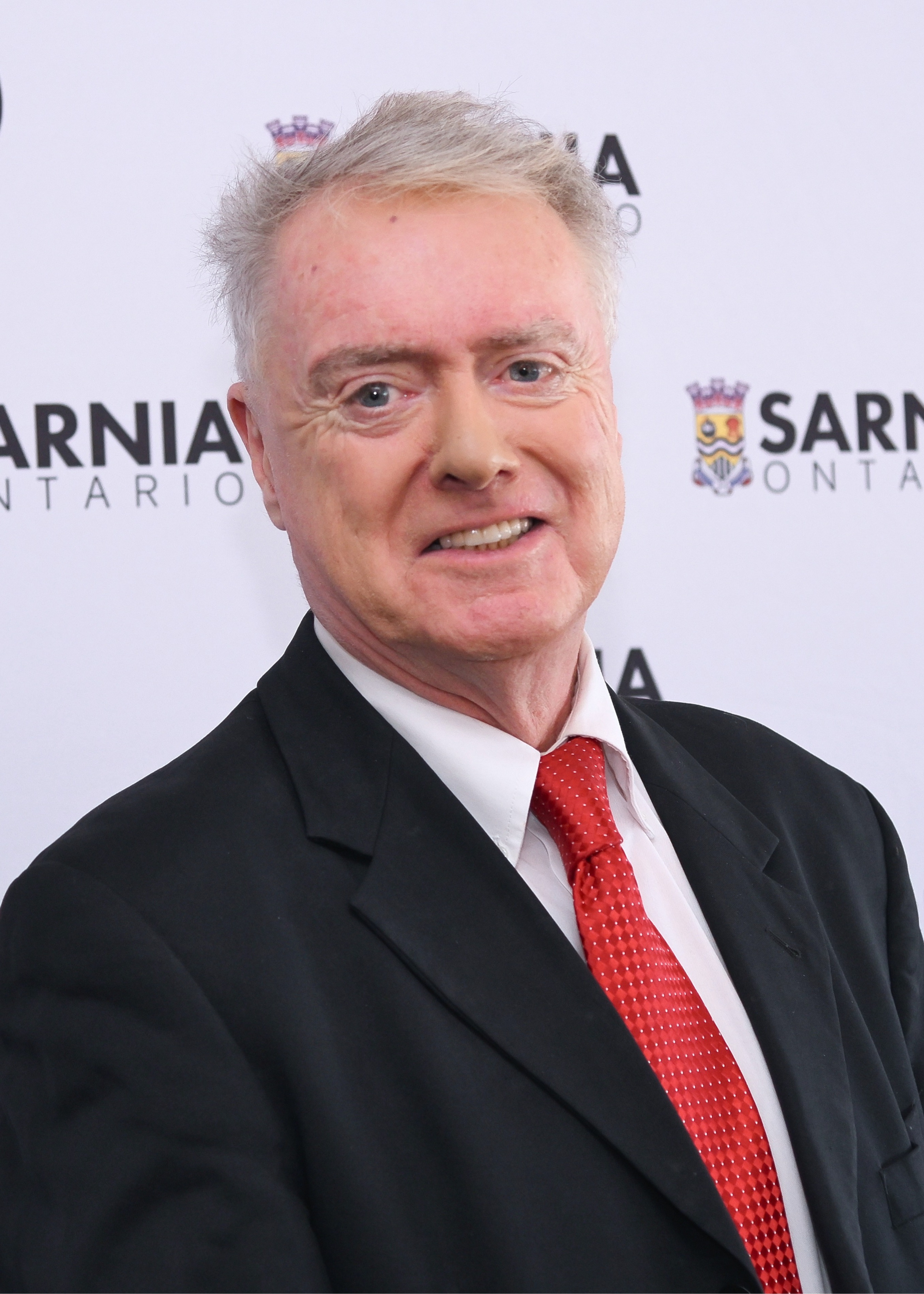
- Bradley in 2025

66th Mayor of Sarnia
- In office 1988–2026
- Preceded by: Ron Gordon (interim)
- Succeeded by: Carrie McEachran

Sarnia City Alderman
- In office 1985–1988

Personal details
- Born: Michael Bradley; July 20, 1955 (age 71) Adelaide, Australia
- Party: Independent
- Profession: Politician
- Website: Official website

Michael Bradley (born July 20, 1955) is a Canadian politician who served as the 66th mayor of Sarnia from 1988 to 2026. He is the longest-serving mayor in Sarnia City Council history.

== Politics ==
Prior to his entering elected office, he served as executive assistant to Sarnia—Lambton MP Bud Cullen. Bradley first ran for public office in 1984, trying to take Cullen's soon-to-be vacated seat. He was nominated by Cullen's Liberal party as candidate for Sarnia—Lambton, but finished second to Progressive Conservative Ken James.

Bradley was elected alderman in Sarnia, Ontario, in 1985 and decided to run for mayor three years later upon the death of Mayor Marceil Saddy. The 1988 municipal election featured four council members running for the mayor's position; the other three were Doug Bain, veteran alderman Wills Rawana, and alderman Elizabeth Wood. Bradley won re-election in 1991, 1994, 1997, 2000, 2003, 2006 and 2010, in particular defeating the 1988 interim Mayor Ron Gordon a second time in the 1994 election. On 27 October 2014, Bradley was elected as mayor for his ninth consecutive term. On October 26 2026 he lost re-election to Carrie McEachran.

In 2010, the Ontario Disability Employment Network approached Bradley about issuing a challenge to other mayors to employ individuals with disabilities.

== Municipal politics ==
Bradley has appeared on many parliamentary committees on behalf of the municipal sector, and has made numerous media appearances, including a regular stint as a discussion panelist on Ontario Morning, CBC Radio One's local morning show in Southern Ontario. A lengthy interview with him in his office at Sarnia City Hall also appeared in Michael Moore's documentary Bowling for Columbine.

== As commentator ==
Bradley is a frequent media commentator on local, provincial, national and international issues. He has appeared on Prime Time News Town Hall Series with Jean Chrétien; NBC News with Tom Brokaw; CNN; CBC Radio Noon; Focus Ontario; As It Happens; and the current CBC Radio shows. He appears on CBC's Ontario Morning Mayors' Panel and was a regular on the national CBC radio show The Point. Bradley appeared in Michael Moore's Bowling for Columbine and was called by Moore "The Voice of Reason". He writes a column for Sarnia Lambton This Week—a mixture of humour, politics and about life—called "Open Mike", which was described by the London Free Press as "having more laughs than a Dave Barry column." Bradley, a long-time Bruce Springsteen fan, contributed to two books about Springsteen in 2007 and 2009—For You and The Light in the Darkness—by Lawrence Kirsch. Mike Bradley also appeared on The Agenda with Steve Paikin in his series "Growing Sarnia."

Bradley was also interviewed by Kevin McShan, a graduate of the St. Clair College Journalism program who now has his own YouTube channel. McShan did an interview on 14 May 2015 on the YouTube channel "What does Windsor Need to do to hire more individuals with Disabilities?" Bradley mentioned, "Well simply, they can look at student hiring, we have had over 60 students in a population of 75,000 in the last four years who were challenged. It continues to grow and now the County and other agencies along with the private sector. So the city has to show leadership and I will be sending out at the end of the month to all Mayors and Council the new Mayor's challenge which will give them an opportunity to show how good it is and how simple it is to do so."

Bradley was also interviewed on The Alim Show, hosted by Alim Nathoo, on 100.3 Sound FM CKMS Radio Waterloo CKMS-FM on 23 February 2016 where he talked about his advocacy for hiring People with Disabilities and how people need to do the right thing by allowing them to participate fully in society. He also mentioned the importance of all cities to have all public transit buses to have "Stop Announcements" and how it is the law to have that in the Province of Ontario. He also mentioned that he has hired People with Disabilities at Sarnia City Hall and ensured all citizens have equal access for jobs and services in the City of Sarnia and the Province of Ontario.

== Controversy ==
In the summer of 2016, Sarnia City Council approved of a 90-day suspension of Bradley's pay following an integrity commissioner's recommendation. The report concluded that Bradley verbally abused, harassed and bullied city employees creating a "toxic environment at city hall" which lead to abrupt resignations of Sarnia's city clerk and planning director.

Council decided on October 24, 2016, to relocate Mayor Mike Bradley's office to the Sarnia Transit building until a new office can be built for him at city hall away from staff. During the meeting, some members of the public in attendance heckled Council for continuing to penalize Bradley.

The restrictions were lifted by council on March 4, 2019.

== Electoral record ==
=== Sarnia municipal election results (Mayor), 2026 ===
Candidate	Vote	%
Carrie McEachran	13,828	47.30
Michael Bradley	7,185	24.58
Bill Dennis	5,899	20.18
Scott Molson	2,207	7.55
George Stanko	114	0.38
Total Valid Votes (Turnout)	29,233	

=== Sarnia municipal election results (Mayor), 2022 ===
Candidate	Vote	%
Michael Bradley (X)	12,561	59.34
Nathan Colquhoun	8,608	40.66
Total Valid Votes (Turnout)	21,169	40.4

=== Sarnia municipal election results (Mayor), 2018 ===
Candidate	Vote	%
Michael Bradley (X)	16,238	64.42
Anne Marie Gillis	7,569	30.03
Kip Cuthbert	592	2.35
Fred Ingham	397	1.57
Total Valid Votes (Turnout)	25,207	48.9

=== Sarnia municipal election results (Mayor), 2014 ===
Candidate	Vote	%
Michael Bradley (X)	13,174	66.39
James J. Carpeneto	4,811	24.24
Jake Cherski	1386	6.98
Fred Ingham	473	2.38
Total Valid Votes	20,207	37.10

=== Sarnia municipal election results (Mayor), 2010 ===
Candidate	Vote	%
Michael Bradley (X)	12,453	69.83
John Vollmar	4,424	24.81
Zak Nicholls	566	3.17
Carlos Murray	390	2.19
Total Valid Votes	18,106	33.07

=== Sarnia municipal election results (Mayor), 2006 ===
Candidate	Vote	%
Michael Bradley (X)	12,623	57.06
Joe Murray	6,421	29.02
Dick Carpani	2,747	12.42
Carlos Murray	332	1.50
Total Valid Votes	22,336	42.00

Source: Sarnia Lambton Votes

=== Sarnia municipal election results (Mayor), 2003 ===
Candidate	Vote	%
Michael Bradley (X)	13,707	66.62
Rose-Ann Nathan	5,716	27.78
Tom Hurst	623	3.03
Carlos Murray	330	1.60
Hermann Martens	198	0.96
Total Valid Votes	20,924	37.02

=== Federal ===
1984 Canadian federal election
Party	Candidate	Votes	%	±%
Progressive Conservative	Ken James	24,066	54.6%	+19.8%
Liberal	Michael Bradley	11,313	25.7%	-14.9%
New Democratic	Julie Foley	8,538	19.4%	-5.1%
Independent	Douglas O'Dell	90	0.2%	
Independent	Fred Kahanek	51	0.1%	
Total valid votes		44,058	100.0%	

Source: Elections Canada
