= Sarnia =

City in Ontario, Canada

- City (lower-tier)
- City of Sarnia
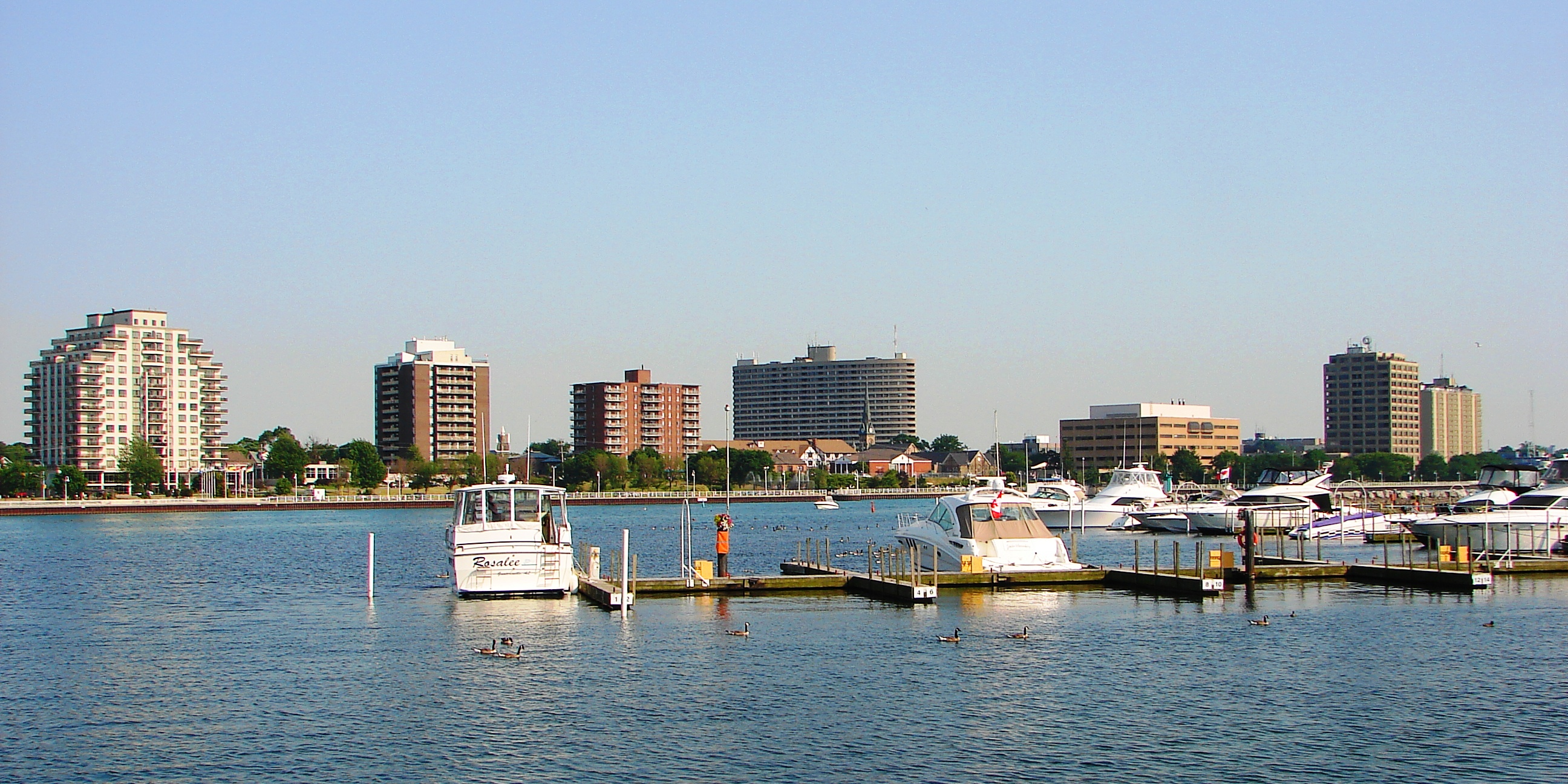
- Nickname: Chemical Valley
- Motto: Sarnia Semper (Latin for "Sarnia Always")
- Location within Canada Location within Southern Ontario Location within Lambton County
- Coordinates: 42°58′53″N 82°19′04″W
- Country: Canada
- Province: Ontario
- County: Lambton
- Settled: 1830s
- Incorporated: 19 June 1856 (town)
- Incorporated: 7 May 1914 (city)

Government
  - Mayor: Carrie McEachran
  - Governing Body: Sarnia City Council
  - MPs: Marilyn Gladu (LPC)
  - MPPs: Bob Bailey (OPC)

Area
  - City: 163.90 km^{2} (63.28 sq mi)
  - Metro: 1,118.65 km^{2} (431.91 sq mi)
- Elevation: 180.60 m (592.5 ft)

Population (2021)
  - City: 72,047 (83rd)
  - Density: 439.6/km^{2} (1,139/sq mi)
  - Metro: 97,592 (44th)
- Forward sortation area: N7S to N7X
- Area codes: 519, 226 and 548
- Website: www.sarnia.ca

Sarnia is a city in Lambton County, Ontario, Canada. It had a 2021 population of 72,047, and is the largest city on Lake Huron. Sarnia is located on the eastern bank of the junction between the Upper and Lower Great Lakes, where Lake Huron flows into the St. Clair River in the Southwestern Ontario region, which forms the Canada–United States border, directly across from Port Huron, Michigan.

The site's natural harbour first attracted the French explorer La Salle. He named the site "The Rapids" on 23 August 1679, when he had horses and men pull his 45-ton barque Le Griffon north against the nearly four-knot current of the St. Clair River. This was the first time that a vessel other than a canoe or other oar-powered vessel had sailed into Lake Huron, and La Salle's voyage was germinal in the development of commercial shipping on the Great Lakes. Located in the natural harbour, the Sarnia port remains an important centre for lake freighters and oceangoing ships carrying cargoes of grain and petroleum products. The natural port and the salt caverns that exist in the surrounding areas, together with the oil discovered in nearby Oil Springs in 1858, led to the dramatic growth of the petroleum industry in this area. Because Oil Springs was the first place in Canada and North America to drill commercially for oil, the knowledge that was acquired there resulted in oil drillers from Sarnia travelling the world teaching other enterprises and nations how to drill for oil.

The complex of refining and chemical companies is called "Chemical Valley" and located south of downtown Sarnia. In 2011, the city had the highest level of particulates air pollution of any Canadian city, but it has since dropped to rank 30th in this hazard. About 60 percent of the particulate matter comes from industries and polluters in the neighbouring United States.

Lake Huron is cooler than the air in summer and warmer than the air in winter; therefore, it moderates Sarnia's humid continental climate, making temperature extremes of hot and cold less evident. In the winter, Sarnia occasionally experiences lake-effect snow from Arctic air blowing across the warmer waters of Lake Huron and condensing to form snow squalls over land.

== History ==
=== Name ===
The word "Sarnia" is Latin for Guernsey, a British Channel Island. In 1829 Sir John Colborne, a former governor of Guernsey, was appointed Lieutenant Governor of Upper Canada. In this capacity, he visited two small settlements in 1835 that had been laid out on the shores of Lake Huron. One of these, named "The Rapids", consisted then of 44 taxpayers, nine frame houses, four log houses, two brick dwellings, two taverns and three stores. The villagers wanted to change its name but were unable to agree on an alternative. The English settlers favoured the name "Buenos Aires", and the ethnic Scottish favoured "New Glasgow".

Sir John Colborne suggested Port Sarnia. On 4 January 1836, the name was formally adopted by a vote of 26 to 16, and Colborne also named the nearby village Moore after British military hero Sir John Moore. Sarnia adopted the nickname "The Imperial City" on 7 May 1914 because of the visit of Canada's Governor General, the Duke of Connaught, and his daughter Princess Patricia.

=== Early history ===
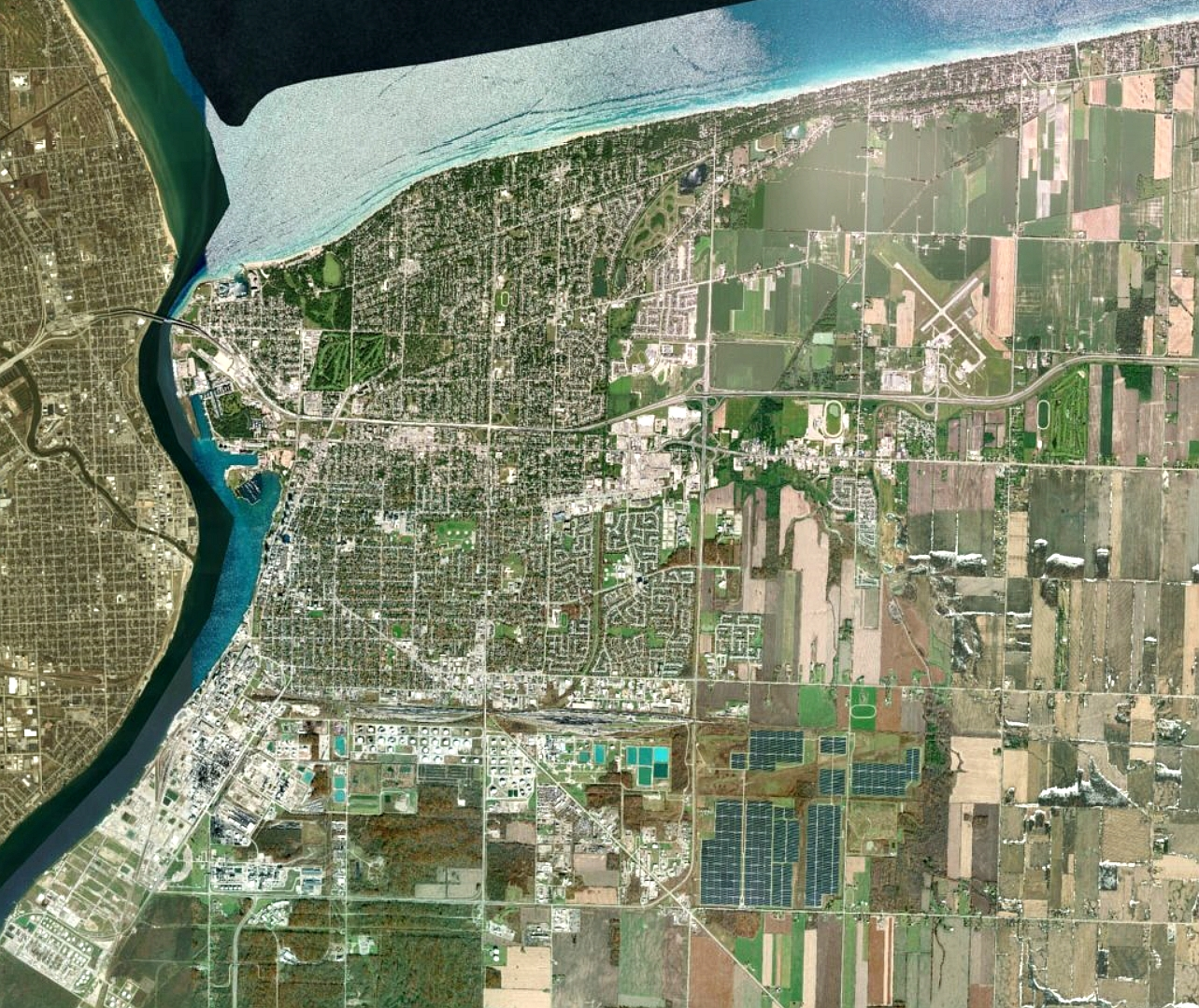
Sarnia from space, 2018

Ethnic French colonists, who came from Detroit, were the first European colonizers of what became Sarnia in about 1807–1810; their role is marked by a historic plaque installed by the Ontario Heritage Society. They were fur traders with the Huron and Three Fires Confederacy. At this time, the French Jesuits also established a mission near the Huron village on the river's east bank. Later, the men established farms, attracted other settlers, and stimulated growth in the area.

The township was surveyed in 1829, and in the early 1830s, a wave of Scottish immigrants settled in the area. They became dominant as English speakers and, for decades, claimed to have founded the city.

Port Sarnia expanded throughout the 19th century; on 19 June 1856, Parliament passed An Act to Incorporate the Town of Sarnia, and the name Port Sarnia was officially changed to Sarnia, effective 1 January 1857. The Act mentioned 1,000 inhabitants in three wards. The important lumber industry was based on the wealth of virgin timber in the area, at a time of development around the Great Lakes. Lumber was especially in demand in the booming US cities of Chicago and Detroit.

The discovery of oil in nearby Oil Springs in 1858 by James Miller Williams, and the arrival of the Great Western Railway in 1858 and the Grand Trunk Railway in 1859, all stimulated Sarnia's growth. The rail lines were later linked directly to the United States by the opening of the St. Clair Tunnel under the St. Clair River at Sarnia in 1890 by the Grand Trunk Railway. This was the first railroad tunnel ever constructed under a river. The tunnel was an engineering marvel in its day, achieved through the development of original techniques for excavating in a compressed air environment.

In 1860 the Prince of Wales met the Chief of the Ojibways of Garden River, with 75 indigenous leaders, at Sarnia and gave them 1860 Queen Victoria Peace medals with the Prince of Wales logo engraved on the obverse.

=== 20th century to present ===
Canada Steamship Lines formed in 1913 from many previous companies that plied the waters of the St. Clair River. One of these companies was Northwest Transportation Company of Sarnia, founded in 1870. By 20 April 1914, when Parliament passed An Act to Incorporate the City of Sarnia, the population had grown to 10,985 in six wards. Sarnia officially became a city as of 7 May 1914.

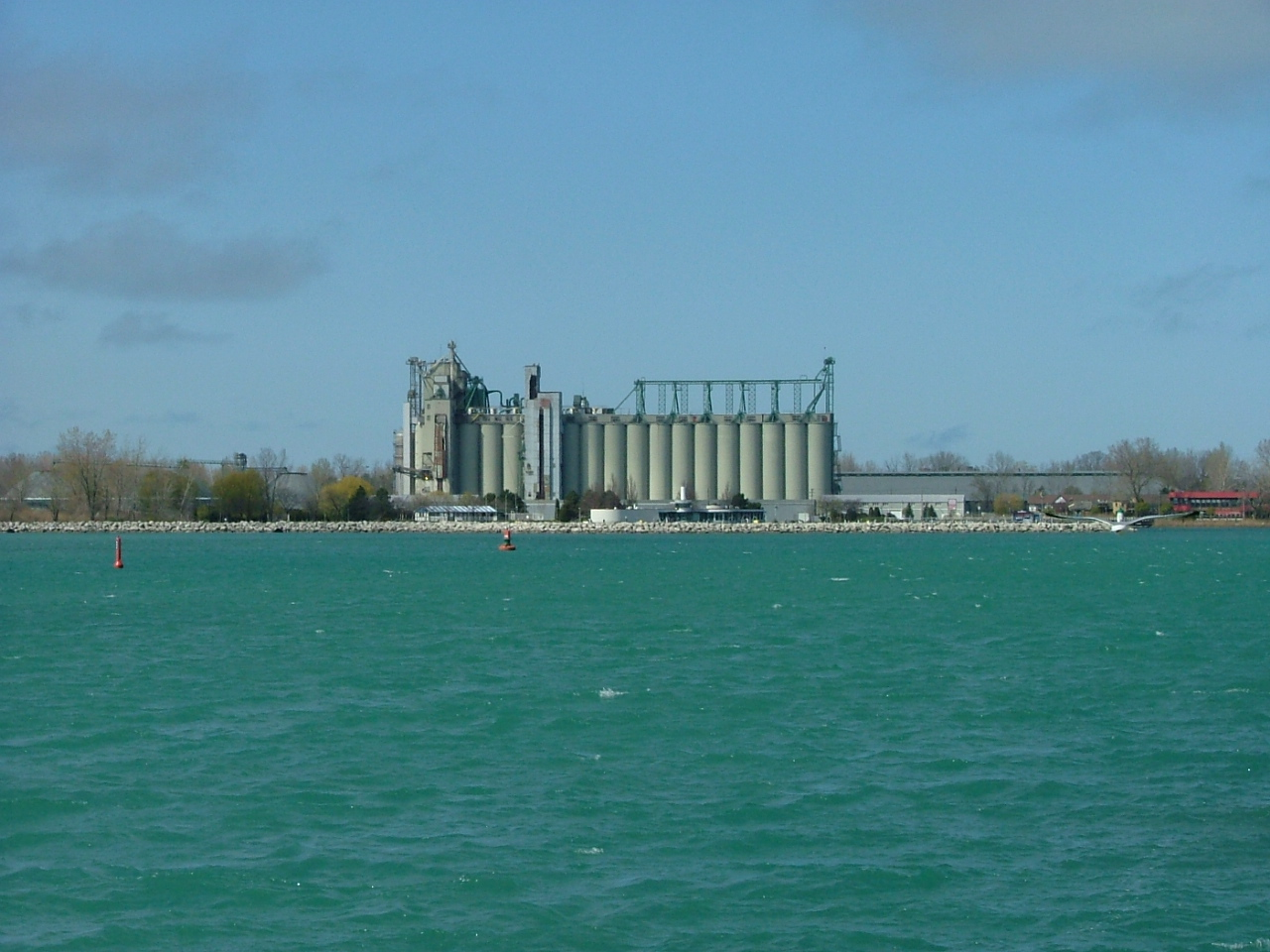
Sarnia's grain elevator

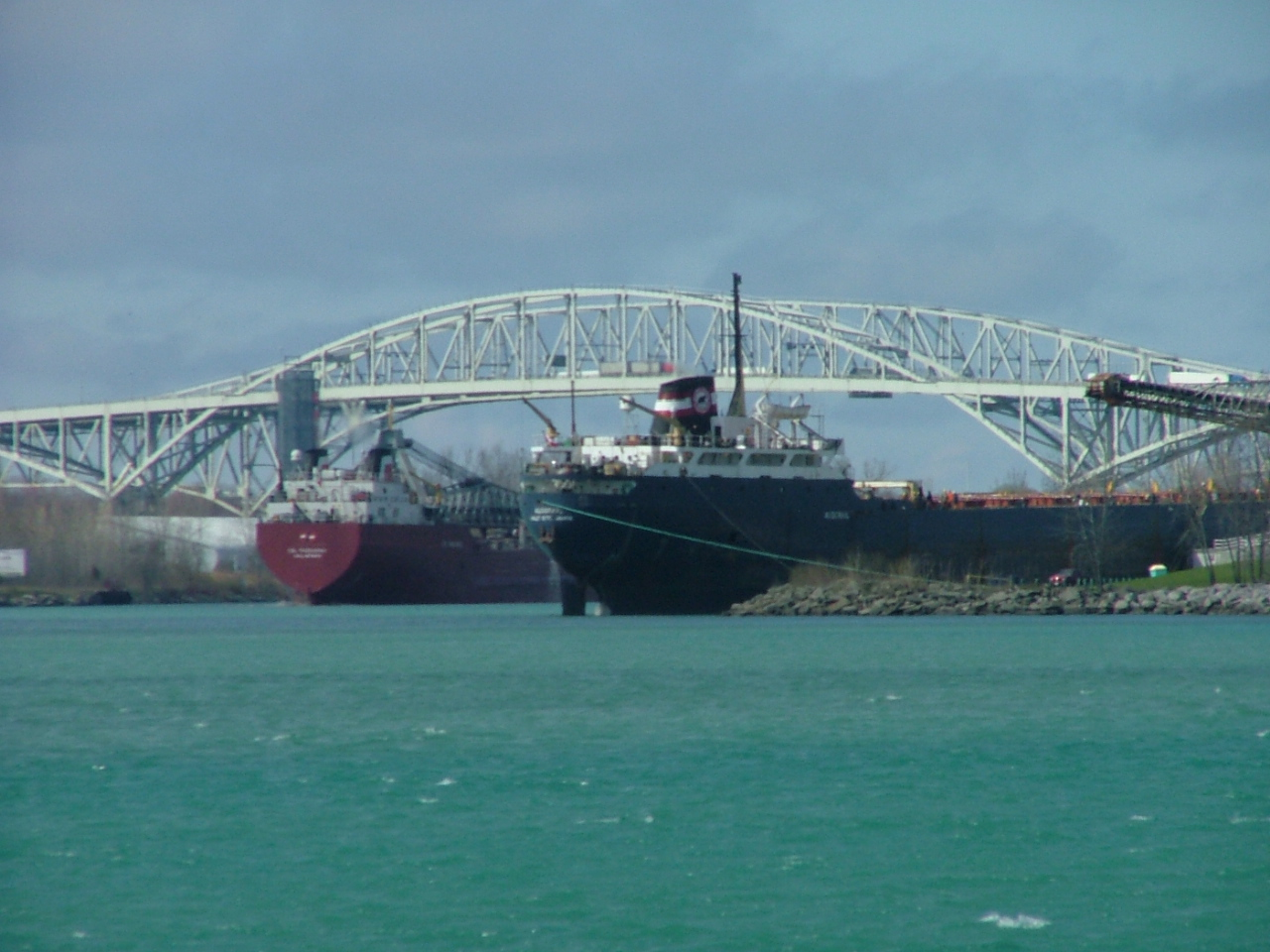
Framed by the Blue Water Bridge, two lake freighters take on cargo in Sarnia Harbour.

Sarnia's grain elevator, which in the early 21st century is the 15th-largest operating in Canada, was built in 1927 after the dredging of Sarnia Harbour to allow access to larger ships. Two years later, grain shipments had become an important part of Sarnia's economy.

The grain elevator rises above the harbour, and next to it is the slip for the numerous bulk carriers and other ships that are part of the contemporary shipping industry. They include vessels from all over the world. The waterway between Detroit and Sarnia is one of the world's busiest, as indicated by the average of 78,943,900 t (77,697,100 long tons; 87,020,800 short tons) of shipping that annually travelled the river going in both directions during the period 1993–2002. Lake freighters and oceangoing ships, which are known as "salties", pass up and down the river at the rate of about one every seven minutes during the shipping season.

The Paul M. Tellier Tunnel, which was named after the retired president of CN in 2004, was bored and began operation in 1995. It accommodates double-stacked rail cars and is located next to the original tunnel, which has been sealed.

A petroleum industry was established in the Sarnia area in 1858, and in 1942, Polymer Corporation manufactured synthetic rubber there during World War II, enhancing Sarnia's notability as a petrochemical centre. During the Cold War, the United States Government included Sarnia on its list of possible targets for a Soviet nuclear strike because of its petrochemical industry.

On 1 January 1991, Sarnia and the neighbouring town of Clearwater (formerly Sarnia Township) were amalgamated as the new city of Sarnia-Clearwater. The amalgamation was initially slated to include the village of Point Edward, although that village's residents resisted. They were eventually permitted to remain independent of the city. On 1 January 1992, the city reverted to the name Sarnia.

Sarnia's population continued to grow from 1961 to 1991, with a 1991 population of 74,376. In 2001, the population had declined by approximately 3,000. Since 2001, Sarnia's population has been growing slowly, with a 2011 population count of 72,366. An April 2010 report "Sarnia-Lambton's Labour Market" states: "Large petrochemical companies are the community's main economic drivers. Over the recent past, several plants have shut down,[sic] and of those still in operation, increased automation and outsourcing has led to significantly fewer workers."

These shutdowns and the resulting loss of jobs, and therefore of population as workers search for employment elsewhere, will contribute to a general decline as forecast by an August 2011 study. It projects a 17% decline in population over the next twenty-five years. The Monteith-Brown study cited outlines a plan for restructuring the city based on hybrid zoning areas, which will bring work opportunities closer to the neighbourhoods where people live. The City of Sarnia and Lambton County are also implementing an economic development plan with an emphasis on bio-industries and renewable energy.

In 2020, Sarnia began to experience a "soaring murder rate". Sarnia had one homicide from 2016 to 2019 and eight homicides from 2020 to 2022. The Toronto Sun reported that the increased murder rate was drug-related, with local youth unable to find opportunities for themselves in the city.

== Geography ==
Sarnia from space, this time at night – Taken by Chris Hadfield, the only astronaut from Sarnia who wanted to snap a photo of his hometown from the International Space Station. Before the flyover, Hadfield arranged with the citizens of Sarnia via Twitter and Facebook to turn on all their lights both inside and outside their homes.

Sarnia is located on the eastern shore of Lake Huron at its extreme southern point, where it flows into the St. Clair River. Most of the surrounding area is flat, and the elevation ranges from 169 to 281 m (554 to 922 ft) above sea level. The soil mainly comprises clay. Despite this high percentage of clay, the soil is remarkably rich for cultivation.

=== Neighbourhoods ===
Wiltshire Park, Woodland, Oak Acres, Wees Beach, Oakwood Corners, Woodrow Shores, and Blackwell are part of the North End of Sarnia, which begins immediately north of Ontario Highway 402 and terminates at the shore of Lake Huron. Blackwell, Bright's Grove, and the western part of Huron Heights are in the northeast part along the shores of Lake Huron. Coronation Park, Fourth Line Heritage Park, College Park, Lucasville, Bunyan, Froomfield, The Tree Streets, Mitton Village, and Sherwood Village are some of the neighbourhoods south of the highway.

The village of Blue Water was built to house workers and their families in Chemical Valley during the construction of Polymer Corporation; at one point, it had nearly 3,000 residents. In 1961, all the residents were relocated, mostly to the North End, to make way for the expansion of the chemical industry. The village was demolished, and all that remains is a historical marker at the corner of Vidal Street and Huron Boulevard. This neighbourhood was largely forgotten until historian Lorraine Williams wrote two books about it. She was instrumental in gaining approval for the historical plaque.

=== Climate ===
Sarnia has a humid continental climate (Köppen climate classification Dfb), verging on the hot summer subtype Dfa. Winters are cold with a few short-lasting Arctic air masses that dip far enough south and bring with them daily high temperatures below −10 °C (14 °F). Sarnia, while not quite located in the southwestern Ontario snowbelt, sometimes receives large quantities of lake-effect snow. Sarnia averages 112.0 cm (44.1 in) of snow per year, while London, inland and to the east, averages 194.3 cm (76.5 in).

The moderating effect of Lake Huron which Sarnia has a long shoreline on its north side, and to a lesser extent other nearby Great Lakes ensure seasonal lag similar to other lakeside locations over much of Southern Ontario. This gives Sarnia a noticeably milder period following Summer and delaying onset of the first frost in the Fall. Conversely, cooler average daytime temperatures tend to prevail for longer after winter breaks, through the late Spring and early Summer as compared to further inland. Daily lows of less than −10 °C (14 °F) occur an average of 29 days a year, and less than −20 °C (−4 °F), only average two days a year. Summers are warm with typically humid conditions. Humidex readings and Dew Points can be very high at times from late May to late September. Sarnia has the second greatest number of high humidex days at or above 35 °C (95 °F) (with 23.16 days on average per year) and humidex days at or above 30 °C (86 °F) (with 61.20 days on average per year) in Canada, ranking after Windsor, Ontario. Thunderstorms are frequent and can occasionally become severe from April to September. Destructive weather is very rare in the area but has occurred, such as the tornado event of 1953.

Climate data for Sarnia (Chris Hadfield Airport), 1991–2020 normals, extremes 1926–present (Note: Extreme high and low-temperature data was recorded at Sarnia from November 1926 to July 1927 and from November 1948 to January 1961, at Sarnia Polysar from February 1961 to November 1967 and at Sarnia Airport from December 1967 to present.)
Month	Jan	Feb	Mar	Apr	May	Jun	Jul	Aug	Sep	Oct	Nov	Dec	Year
Record high °C (°F)	18.9 (66.0)	19.4 (66.9)	28.2 (82.8)	31.2 (88.2)	34.4 (93.9)	40.1 (104.2)	37.3 (99.1)	37.9 (100.2)	37.2 (99.0)	32.5 (90.5)	26.7 (80.1)	18.0 (64.4)	40.1 (104.2)
Mean maximum °C (°F)	10.3 (50.5)	10.4 (50.7)	18.2 (64.8)	24.8 (76.6)	29.4 (84.9)	32.6 (90.7)	33.0 (91.4)	32.3 (90.1)	30.7 (87.3)	25.6 (78.1)	17.9 (64.2)	11.7 (53.1)	34.2 (93.6)
Mean daily maximum °C (°F)	−0.9 (30.4)	0.0 (32.0)	5.0 (41.0)	11.9 (53.4)	18.7 (65.7)	24.0 (75.2)	26.5 (79.7)	25.5 (77.9)	22.2 (72.0)	15.4 (59.7)	8.0 (46.4)	2.1 (35.8)	13.2 (55.8)
Daily mean °C (°F)	−4.6 (23.7)	−4.0 (24.8)	0.6 (33.1)	6.7 (44.1)	13.1 (55.6)	18.6 (65.5)	21.3 (70.3)	20.4 (68.7)	16.7 (62.1)	10.7 (51.3)	4.2 (39.6)	−1.2 (29.8)	8.5 (47.3)
Mean daily minimum °C (°F)	−8.2 (17.2)	−7.9 (17.8)	−3.7 (25.3)	1.5 (34.7)	7.1 (44.8)	13.0 (55.4)	16.0 (60.8)	15.3 (59.5)	11.3 (52.3)	6.0 (42.8)	0.4 (32.7)	−4.4 (24.1)	3.9 (39.0)
Mean minimum °C (°F)	−18.9 (−2.0)	−18.5 (−1.3)	−13.0 (8.6)	−5.1 (22.8)	0.5 (32.9)	6.1 (43.0)	10.1 (50.2)	8.9 (48.0)	4.0 (39.2)	−1.3 (29.7)	−7.8 (18.0)	−13.7 (7.3)	−21.0 (−5.8)
Record low °C (°F)	−28.9 (−20.0)	−28.3 (−18.9)	−25.6 (−14.1)	−11.7 (10.9)	−5.0 (23.0)	−1.1 (30.0)	4.4 (39.9)	1.2 (34.2)	−1.6 (29.1)	−8.9 (16.0)	−15.0 (5.0)	−25.0 (−13.0)	−28.9 (−20.0)
Average precipitation mm (inches)	56.5 (2.22)	47.7 (1.88)	56.9 (2.24)	79.3 (3.12)	85.2 (3.35)	92.5 (3.64)	80.4 (3.17)	70.9 (2.79)	84.1 (3.31)	78.4 (3.09)	79.5 (3.13)	60.0 (2.36)	871.3 (34.30)
Average rainfall mm (inches)	29.0 (1.14)	26.8 (1.06)	34.1 (1.34)	70.6 (2.78)	88.1 (3.47)	89.5 (3.52)	80.5 (3.17)	63.5 (2.50)	93.3 (3.67)	77.6 (3.06)	68.2 (2.69)	39.0 (1.54)	765.2 (30.13)
Average snowfall cm (inches)	34.2 (13.5)	20.2 (8.0)	22.0 (8.7)	3.5 (1.4)	0.0 (0.0)	0.0 (0.0)	0.0 (0.0)	0.0 (0.0)	0.0 (0.0)	0.5 (0.2)	7.0 (2.8)	25.0 (9.8)	112.4 (44.3)
Average precipitation days (≥ 0.2 mm)	15.2	12.0	13.2	14.1	14.1	13.1	11.2	10.2	10.4	12.8	14.2	14.1	154.6
Average rainy days (≥ 0.2 mm)	5.9	4.9	7.4	12.7	13.8	11.4	11.5	10.5	10.4	12.1	11.4	7.1	119.2
Average snowy days (≥ 0.2 cm)	11.7	7.9	7.4	2.5	0.0	0.0	0.0	0.0	0.0	0.25	3.6	8.4	41.8
Average relative humidity (%) (at 0600 LST)	82.1	80.9	81.6	81.5	83.3	85.9	87.9	90.1	89.8	85.3	82.9	83.1	84.5
Average dew point °C (°F)	−7.4 (18.7)	−7.2 (19.0)	−3.3 (26.1)	1.6 (34.9)	7.9 (46.2)	13.6 (56.5)	16.5 (61.7)	16.3 (61.3)	12.6 (54.7)	6.4 (43.5)	0.6 (33.1)	−4.1 (24.6)	4.5 (40.1)
Mean monthly sunshine hours	81.7	100.3	139.9	185.2	236.6	266.3	299.1	254.3	191.3	151.2	87.6	67.4	2,060.9
Percentage possible sunshine	28.0	33.9	37.9	46.2	52.2	58.0	64.3	58.9	50.9	44.2	29.9	24.0	44.0
Source 1: Environment Canada
Source 2: weatherstats.ca (for dewpoint and monthly&yearly average absolute maximum&minimum temperature)

== Demographics ==
Historical populations
Year	Pop.	±%
1841	610	—
1871	2,929	+380.2%
1881	3,874	+32.3%
1891	6,692	+72.7%
1901	8,176	+22.2%
1911	9,947	+21.7%
1921	14,877	+49.6%
1931	18,191	+22.3%
1941	18,734	+3.0%
1951	34,697	+85.2%
1961	50,976	+46.9%
1971	57,644	+13.1%
1981	50,829	−11.8%
1991	74,167	+45.9%
1996	72,738	−1.9%
2001	70,876	−2.6%
2006	71,419	+0.8%
2011	72,366	+1.3%
2016	71,594	−1.1%
2021	72,047	+0.6%
Population figures reflect Sarnia's amalgamation with Clearwater in 1991.

In the 2021 Census of Population conducted by Statistics Canada, Sarnia had a population of 72,047 living in 32,188 of its 33,902 total private dwellings, a change of 0.6% from its 2016 population of 71,594. With a land area of 163.9 km^{2} (63.3 sq mi), it had a population density of 439.6/km^{2} (1,138.5/sq mi) in 2021.

The median age in Sarnia is 46.0 as of 2021, which is older than the Canadian median of 41.6, indicative of Sarnia's aging population.

The median income for all persons 15 years old or older in Sarnia in 2015 was $33,833, while the median family income was $86,654, in line with the averages for Ontario as a whole, at $33,539 and $91,089, respectively. In 2021, the median price of a house in Sarnia was $430,000, compared to the $887,290 of Ontario as a whole.

=== Ethnicity ===
As of the 2021 Census, Sarnia was 86.2% White, 8.3% visible minorities, and 5.5% Indigenous. The largest visible minority groups in the city are South Asians (2.7%), Black Canadians (1.6%), and Latin Americans (0.9%).

Panethnic groups in the City of Sarnia (2001−2021)
Panethnic group	2021		2016		2011		2006		2001	
Panethnic group	Pop.	%	Pop.	%	Pop.	%	Pop.	%	Pop.	%
European (Note: Statistic includes all persons that did not make up part of a visible minority or an indigenous identity.)	62,035	87.46%	62,925	89.41%	65,745	92.59%	65,965	93.79%	66,375	94.79%
Indigenous	3,000	4.23%	2,745	3.9%	1,990	2.8%	1,490	2.12%	1,285	1.84%
South Asian	1,915	2.7%	1,225	1.74%	1,050	1.48%	790	1.12%	560	0.8%
African	1,125	1.59%	990	1.41%	580	0.82%	530	0.75%	420	0.6%
East Asian (Note: Statistic includes total responses of "Chinese", "Korean", and "Japanese" under visible minority section on census.)	705	0.99%	730	1.04%	660	0.93%	635	0.9%	570	0.81%
Southeast Asian (Note: Statistic includes total responses of "Filipino" and "Southeast Asian" under visible minority section on census.)	695	0.98%	620	0.88%	425	0.6%	335	0.48%	365	0.52%
Latin American	620	0.87%	385	0.55%	150	0.21%	235	0.33%	220	0.31%
Middle Eastern (Note: Statistic includes total responses of "West Asian" and "Arab" under visible minority section on census.)	525	0.74%	505	0.72%	175	0.25%	175	0.25%	95	0.14%
Other/multiracial (Note: Statistic includes total responses of "Visible minority, n.i.e." and "Multiple visible minorities" under visible minority section on census.)	325	0.46%	235	0.33%	230	0.32%	195	0.28%	140	0.2%
Total responses	70,930	98.45%	70,375	98.3%	71,010	98.13%	70,335	98.48%	70,020	98.79%
Total population	72,047	100%	71,594	100%	72,366	100%	71,419	100%	70,876	100%
Note: Totals greater than 100% due to multiple origin responses

=== Language ===
In 2021, 87.5% of Sarnians called English their mother tongue, 2.2% listed French, and 3.4% said another language was their mother tongue. 1.1% listed both English and a non-official language as their mother tongue.

=== Religion ===
Largest non-Christian religion in Sarnia CA by census tract based on the 2021 census

In 2021, 56.8% of residents were Christian, down from 69.5% in 2011. 25.2% of the population was Catholic, 21.1% were Protestant, and 6.6% were Christians of unspecified denomination. All other Christian denominations/Christian-related traditions comprised 3.9% of the population. 39.5% of residents were nonreligious or secular, up from 27.9% in 2011. All other religions (or spiritual beliefs) comprised 3.6% of residents. The largest non-Christian religions were Islam (1.2%) and Hinduism (1.1%).

== Economy ==
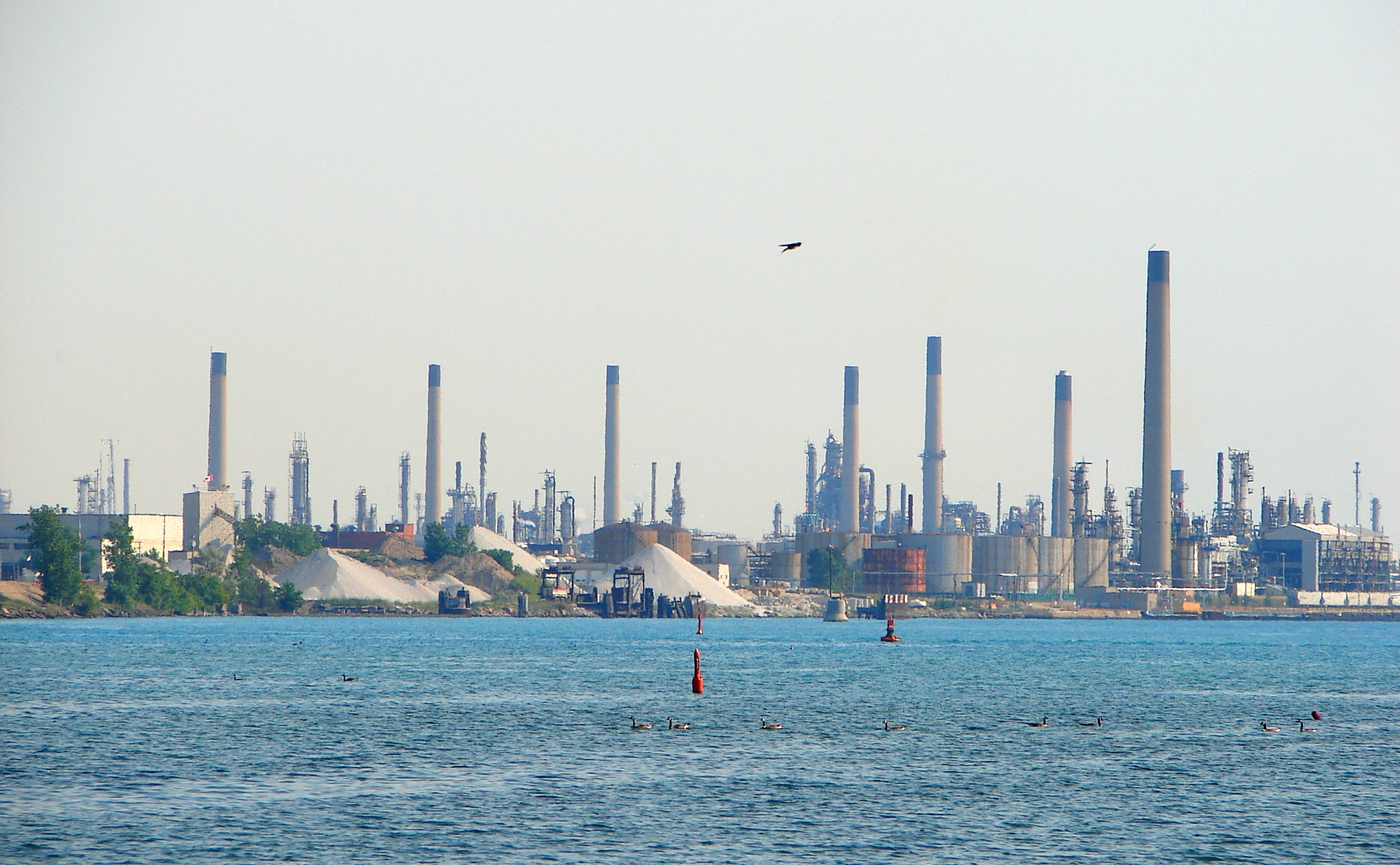
Petrochemical industry of Sarnia's Chemical Valley

In its March 2011 Labour Market Report, the Sarnia-Lambton Workforce Development Board states that: "Even though employment in both the petrochemical and agricultural industries has declined significantly in recent years, these two industries remain central drivers of the Sarnia Lambton economy."

When World War II threatened tropical sources of natural latex for rubber, Sarnia was selected as the site to spearhead the development of synthetic petroleum-based rubbers for war materials. Polymer Corporation was built by Dow Chemical at the request of the Government of Canada. Large pipelines bring Alberta oil to Sarnia, where oil refining and petrochemical production have become mainstays of the city's economy. Shell Canada, Imperial Oil, and Suncor Energy (Sunoco) operate refineries in Sarnia. Large salt beds found under the city became a source of chlorine and other significant ingredients which contributed to the success of Chemical Valley. Chemical companies operating in Sarnia include NOVA Chemicals, Bayer (Lanxess and H.C. Starck), Cabot Corporation, and Ethyl Corporation.

Dow Chemical ceased operations at its Sarnia site in 2009, with the plants after that decommissioned and the land sold to neighbouring TransAlta Energy Corporation. TransAlta produces power and steam for industry, and is the largest natural gas co-generation plant in Canada. It has created the Bluewater Energy Park on the former Dow site. Dow returned to Sarnia in 2019, when it took ownership of a former Dupont production site on Albert Street in Corunna that modifies polyethylene and polypropylene.

Lanxess produces more than 150,000 t (150,000 long tons; 170,000 short tons) of butyl rubber annually at its Sarnia location and is the sole producer of regulatory-approved, food-grade butyl rubber, used in the manufacture of chewing gum. Within the boundaries of its Sarnia plant Lanxess has also created the Bio-industrial Park Sarnia.

Chemical Valley and the surrounding area are home to 62 facilities and refineries. These industrial complexes are the heart of Sarnia's infrastructure and economy. They directly employ nearly 8,000 and contribute to almost 45,000 additional jobs in the area. In 1971, the Canadian government deemed this area so important to the economic development of the country that it printed an image of a Sarnia Oil Refinery on the reverse of the Canadian $10 note. The huge industrial area is the cause of significant air and water pollution. The Canada Wide Daily Standard for airborne particulate matter and ozone pollution, regulation PM2.5, is 30 micrograms per cubic metre. Forty-five percent of this particulate air pollution in Sarnia comes from Chemical Valley, and the rest drifts over the St. Clair River from the neighbouring United States in the form of what is known as "Transboundary Air Pollution".

Sarnia is the location of Enbridge's Sarnia Photovoltaic Power Plant. The facility underwent a full commercial operation in December 2009, with 20 MW of power. As of September 2010, the plant was the largest photovoltaic (PV) solar power generation facility in the world, putting out 97 MW.

The 32 ha (80-acre) Western University Research Park, Sarnia-Lambton Campus was established in 2003 by the University of Western Ontario as a joint initiative with the County of Lambton and the City of Sarnia. The park is also the location of the Bioindustrial Innovation Centre, Canada's centre for the commercialization of industrial biotechnology.

In 2015, BioAmber opened a $141 million plant that manufactures 30,000 t (30,000 long tons; 33,000 short tons) of succinic acid per year, a chemical used to make plastics, lubricants, paint, cosmetics, food additives, and other products. BioAmber plans to construct a second site and may build it in Sarnia. Solutions4CO2 is developing a 4,645 m^{2} (50,000 sq ft) demonstration facility at Bluewater Energy Park. This company captures waste gas/water streams to process into value-added co-products, pharmaceutical drugs, and biofuels. PlantForm Corporation, a Canadian biotech startup company producing ultra-low-cost therapeutic antibody drugs, opened an office at the Western University Research Park in 2011. At the same Park, from the summer of 2012 to the summer of 2016, KmX Corporation operated a pilot plant to produce membranes that filter wastewater from industrial processes. KmX production in Sarnia has since moved to Ottawa and Edmonton.

=== Retail and hospitality ===
Sarnia has one large mall, Lambton Mall, with 72 stores. The mall, along with several smaller shopping centres, stores, and hotels, is the primary shopping area.

== Arts and culture ==
=== Music, theatre, and arts ===
The International Symphony Orchestra plays at the Imperial Theatre for an annual season lasting from September to April. In addition to symphonic concerts, the Imperial Theatre offers year-round dramatic productions; Former Max Webster frontman Kim Mitchell has returned to his hometown on occasion to play a concert, including his visit in 2008 for Sarnia's popular Ribfest. In this competition, local amateur chefs share their recipes for barbecued ribs and compete against each other. Canadian composer and music educator Raymond Murray Schafer was born in Sarnia and developed his radical schizophonia techniques there.

The Sarnia Bayfest (which was preceded by the "Festival by the Bay") was an annual concert festival that featured big-name rock and country bands. Musicians and groups such as Aerosmith, Kiss, Keith Urban, Jon Bon Jovi and Rascal Flatts have played at the event. Financial problems caused the event's cancellation in 2013. In the summer of 2017, a new festival called Bluewater Borderfest enjoyed a successful inaugural event.

Besides the single museum in Sarnia proper, six other local museums document Sarnia's history, including its legacy as the home of the North American oil industry. Gallery Lambton offers 12 annual art exhibitions. In 2012 the Judith and Norman Alex Art Gallery opened. It is an international Category A art gallery, featuring exhibitions of Canadian art history, including paintings from the Group of Seven.

In 2015, the South Western International Film Festival was launched at the city's Imperial Theatre.

During the Christmas season, the city of Sarnia presents the annual "Celebration of Lights" in Centennial Park. The event was created in 1984 by Wills Rawana and a committee funded by the retail chain Hudson's Bay, and the national telecommunications company Telus. From modest beginnings, the event has garnered numerous awards as it has grown, including second place in the 2002 Canadian Government's Canada WinterLights competition. The celebration was incorporated in its national prizewinning year and is now run by a voluntary Board of Directors.

== Attractions ==
Canatara Park

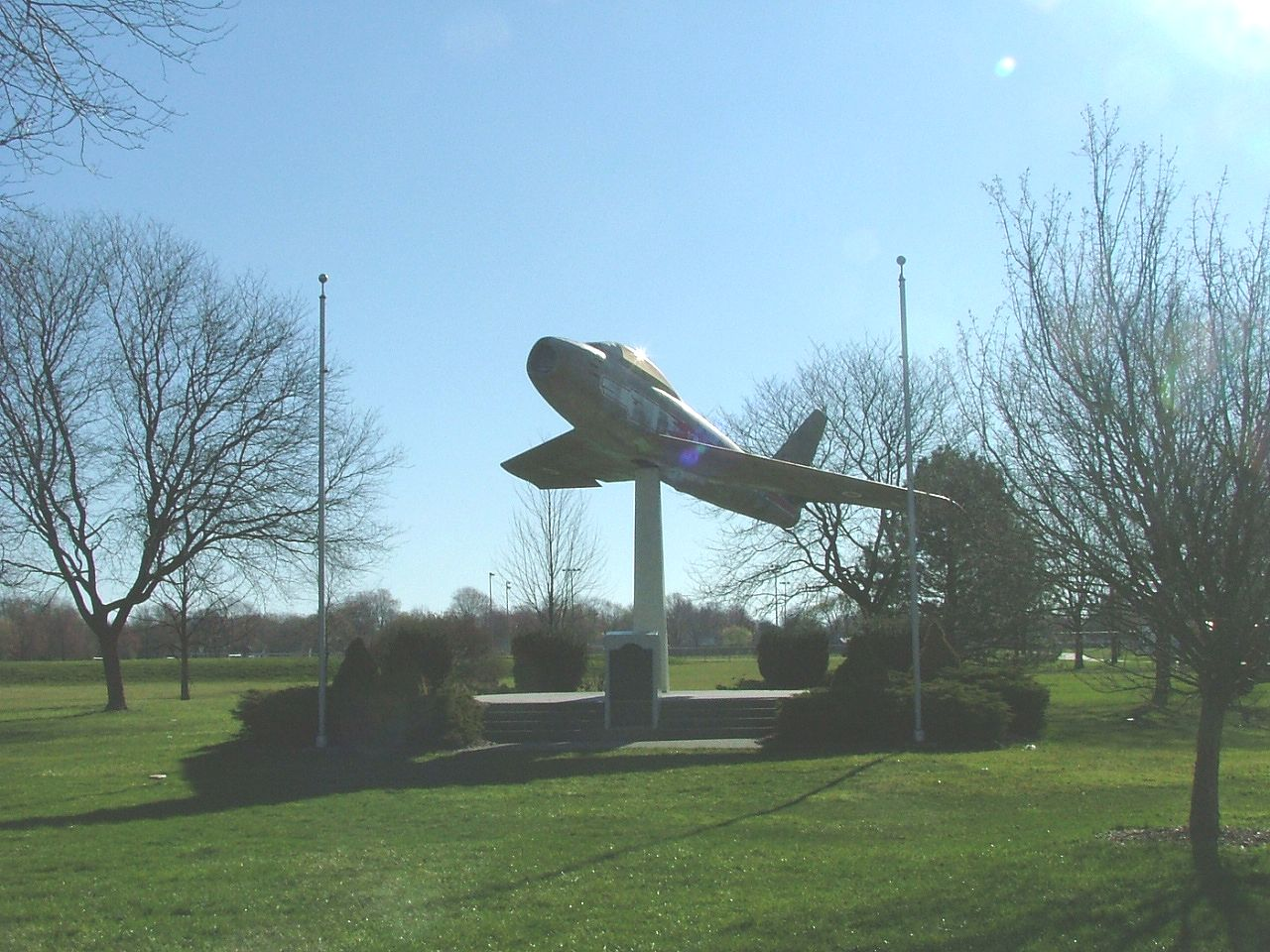
Germain Park, Canadair Sabre, in Golden Hawks paint scheme

There are more than 100 parks in Sarnia, the largest being Canatara Park, which covers more than 81 ha (200 acres) along the shore of Lake Huron. Canatara is an Ojibwe word that means Blue Water. The park was opened in 1933. Within the park is Lake Chipican, a haven for many different species of birds on their migration routes. Most years, birdwatchers recognize around 150 species. The park also maintains a Children's Animal Farm as part of Sarnia's commitment to wildlife. The annual "Christmas on the Farm" weekend event held at the Farm in early December is a popular community event enjoyed by families. Canatara Park is one of the first parks in southern Ontario to feature an outdoor fitness equipment installation.

The largest recreational park in Sarnia is Germain Park, which incorporates five baseball diamonds, four soccer fields, an outdoor pool, and the Community Gardens. As a memorial to Canadian aviators who died in World War II, one of the remaining Canadair Sabres in Canada is on display in the park.

Centennial Park was opened on 1 July Dominion Day holiday in 1967 as part of Canada's centenary celebrations. The City of Sarnia decided in 2013 to close much of Centennial Park, after the discovery of toxic levels of lead and asbestos in the soil. After years of remediation, the park was reopened in 2017.

Howard Watson Trail is a former railway line that passes through a combination of urban and rural areas. This linear park is managed by a volunteer committee and spans 16 km (9.9 mi) through wooded areas and alongside ponds. Benches are available along the path as well as washroom facilities. The path is open year-round: bicycling, running, and dog walking are popular activities in the summer. Snowshoeing and cross-country skiing can be enjoyed on snowy days. Access to Lake Huron is available at Blackwell Side Road.

Sarnia connects to the Great Lakes Waterfront Trail, which stretches over 2,100 km (1,300 mi) along the Canadian shores of Lake Ontario, Lake Erie, Lake St. Clair, Lake Huron and the Niagara, Detroit, and St. Lawrence rivers. The Great Lakes Waterfront Trail connects 114 communities and hundreds of parks and natural areas, including wetlands, forests, and beaches.

Sarnia has one museum within its city limits, known as "Stones 'N Bones", which houses over 6,000 exhibits. The collection includes rocks, artifacts, fossils, and bones from around the world.

The former Discovery House Museum has been converted into a hospice. This historic house, built between 1869 and 1875, is recognized as a testament to Victorian Era construction.

The city's sandy freshwater beaches are a popular tourist attraction, while the sheltered harbour houses marinas for recreational sailing. Since 1925, the 400 km (250 mi) Mackinac race from Sarnia/Port Huron to Mackinac Island at the north end of the lake has been the highlight of the sailing season, drawing more than 3,000 sailors each year.

Sarnia's fresh-cut potato fries are another popular tourist attraction. Thousands of visitors visit the chip trucks parked under the Blue Water Bridge annually. In 2012, during construction along the waterfront, Sarnia officials created a special detour to enable visitors to reach the chip trucks. Realizing the popularity of Sarnia's chip trucks, the Ontario Medical Association includes them in a campaign to have fries and other junk food labelled for being dangerous in the same manner as cigarettes.

== Sports ==
Sarnia is home to the Sarnia Sting, a junior ice hockey team in the Ontario Hockey League. Dino Ciccarelli, a former NHL player, was a part owner of the team. Former Sting player Steven Stamkos was selected first overall in the 2008 NHL entry draft by the Tampa Bay Lightning, and was followed by Nail Yakupov in 2012. Sarnia is also home to the Sarnia Legionnaires ice hockey team, which plays in the Greater Ontario Junior Hockey League. The team is the successor to the Sarnia Legionnaires (1954–1970), who won five Western Jr. 'B' championships and four Sutherland Cups during 16 seasons in the Ontario Hockey Association.

Sarnia has a successful tradition in Canadian football. As members of the Ontario Rugby Football Union, the local team Sarnia Imperials twice won the Grey Cup in 1934 and 1936. The modern Sarnia Imperials are a semi-professional team playing in the Northern Football Conference.

Mike Ceresia is a Sarnia native. He won four IRF World Racquetball Championships and multiple silver medals between 1988 and 2002.

The Sarnia-born world champion curler Steve Bice played as alternate for the Glenn Howard rink in the 2007 Tim Hortons Brier and 2007 Ford World Men's Curling Championship, winning both times.

== Government ==
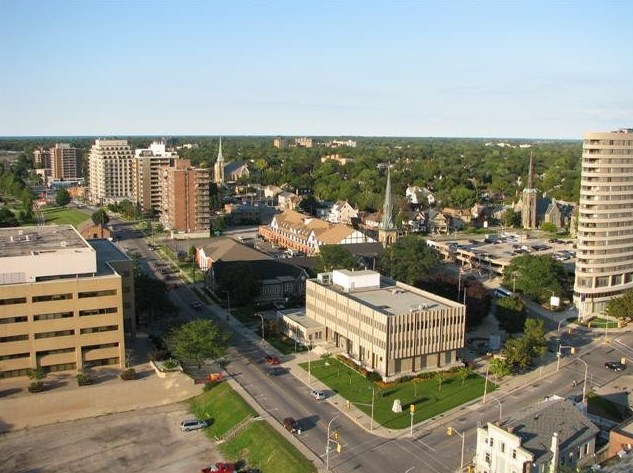
City Hall and downtown

Sarnia City Council consists of nine elected members: the Mayor, four city members, and four county members. The Mayor and all Council members are elected to four-year terms. The four Lambton County Council members serve both County and City Council.

Former mayor, Mike Bradley, previously held the position of mayor from December 1988 to November 2026 and is currently the second longest-serving mayor in the province of Ontario behind Milton's Gord Krantz. Mike Bradley was defeated in the 2026 sarnia mayoral municipal election in October of 2026 to Carrie McEachran. Past mayors of the city have included Andy Brandt, Marceil Saddy, Paul Blundy, and Thomas George Johnston.

At the provincial level, Sarnia is located within the Sarnia—Lambton provincial electoral district, represented in 2013 by Bob Bailey, a member of the Progressive Conservative Party of Ontario. At the federal level, Sarnia is located within the Sarnia—Lambton federal electoral district, which in 2026 is represented by Liberal Marilyn Gladu.

Over the past 50 years, Sarnia's voters have been moderate. The party affiliation of its Members of Parliament, both provincial and federal, has swung back and forth largely between the Liberal and Progressive Conservative parties (a New Democrat was elected in their 1990 provincial wave).

== Infrastructure ==
=== Transportation ===
The Blue Water Bridge links Sarnia and its neighbouring village of Point Edward to the city of Port Huron in the United States. It spans the St. Clair River, which connects Lake Huron to Lake St. Clair. The bridge's original three-lane span opened in 1938, was twinned on 22 July 1997, making the bridge the fourth-busiest border crossing in Ontario.

The Blue Water Bridge border crossing makes use of both the NEXUS and the Free and Secure Trade (FAST) program. Linking Highway 402 with the American Interstate 94 (I-94) and I-69, the bridge forms part of the NAFTA Superhighway. It is one of the most important gateways on the north–south truck routes.

Public transportation within the City of Sarnia, including conventional bus transit, transportation of people with disabilities, transportation support for major events, and charter services, is provided by Sarnia Transit. From the city's local Sarnia Chris Hadfield Airport, Jazz Aviation use to operate services to and from Toronto Pearson International Airport on behalf of Air Canada Express, Air Canada plans to launch a motorcoach service leaving twice daily for Toronto airport in June 2026. For rail travel, Sarnia is one of the two western termini, along with Windsor, of the Via Rail Quebec City – Windsor Corridor. It has service departing Sarnia station in the morning and returning in the evening.

=== Health care ===
Sarnia is served by Bluewater Health, a hospital with 188 acute care beds, 70 complex continuing care beds and 27 rehabilitation beds. The hospital opened in 2010, following the amalgamation of several smaller facilities and the destruction of the old hospital on Mitton Street.

== Education ==
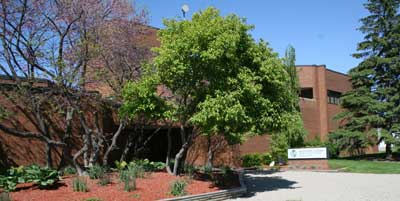
Sarnia Education Centre of the Lambton Kent District School Board

The Lambton Kent District School Board is responsible for the 13 elementary and three secondary public schools (Northern Collegiate Institute and Vocational School, Alexander MacKenzie Secondary School, and Great Lakes Secondary School) located within Sarnia's boundaries.

The St. Clair Catholic District School Board is responsible for the city's seven elementary and only secondary Catholic, St. Patrick's. In 2014, St. Patrick's and St. Christopher's merged under the St. Patrick's name on St. Christopher's North Sarnia site.

The Conseil scolaire catholique Providence (CSC Providence) represents the two French Catholic schools in the city, Saint-François-Xavier and Saint-Thomas-d'Aquin. In comparison, the Conseil scolaire Viamonde operates two French public schools, the elementary École Les Rapides and the secondary École Secondaire Franco-Jeunesse. There are also two independent Christian elementary schools in Sarnia—Sarnia Christian School and Temple Christian Academy.

Lambton College, which offers two and three-year programs and diplomas, is one of Ontario's 21 colleges of applied arts and technology. It has a full-time enrolment of 3,500 and a part-time enrolment of about 8,000. It is the city's only post-secondary school.

== Media ==
Four radio stations originate from Sarnia, although other stations rebroadcast their signal there, notably CKTI-FM (103.3 FM), a First Nations produced station from Kettle Point, and CBEG-FM (90.3 FM) and CBEF-3-FM (98.3 FM), simulcasts of CBC Radio One (English) and Ici Radio-Canada Première (French), respectively, from Windsor, Ontario.

- CHOK, (1070 AM), country/news/sports
- CFGX-FM The Fox, (99.9 FM) adult contemporary
- CHOK-1-FM, (103.9 FM) (rebroadcaster of CHOK AM)
- CHKS-FM, (106.3 FM) Classic hits

The city's main daily newspaper is the Sarnia Observer, owned by Postmedia, which purchased Sun Media in 2014 for $316 million. The community publications Sarnia This Week, Lambton County Smart Shopper and Business Trends are owned by Bowes Publishing. The monthly business-oriented newspaper First Monday is owned by Huron Web Printing and Graphics. Lambton Shield Publishing has been in operation since November 2010 and runs an on-line only news website, lambtonshield.com, delivering local news and services to the Sarnia-Lambton area. There are two magazines currently published in Sarnia, Business Trends and Report on Industry. Business Trends is distributed through City Hall, while "Report on Industry" is sent to executives in surrounding businesses. Report on Industry articles are available online.

== See also ==
- Environmental impact of the chemical industry in Sarnia
