= Bob Bailey (politician) =

Canadian politician (born c.1951)

Bob Bailey MPP
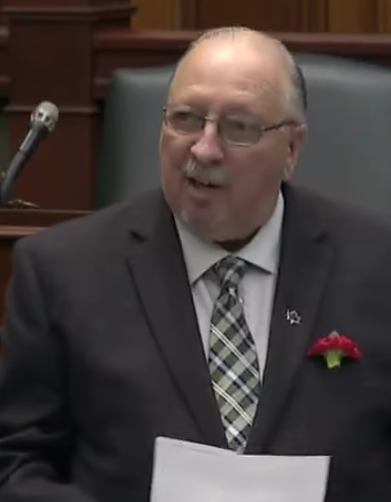

Parliamentary Assistant to the Minister of Government and Consumer Services
- Incumbent
- Assumed office June 29, 2018
- Minister: Todd Smith; Bill Walker; Lisa Thompson

Member of the Ontario Provincial Parliament for Sarnia—Lambton
- Incumbent
- Assumed office October 10, 2007
- Preceded by: Caroline Di Cocco

Personal details
- Born: 1951 (age 74–75) Petrolia, Ontario
- Party: Progressive Conservative
- Occupation: Contractor
- Portfolio: Deputy opposition whip (2011-2014)

Robert W. Bailey MPP (born c. 1951) is a politician in Ontario, Canada. He is a Progressive Conservative member of the Legislative Assembly of Ontario representing the riding of Sarnia—Lambton. He has been an MPP since 2007.

== Background ==
Bailey was born in Petrolia, Ontario in the township of Enniskillen. He worked as a contract coordinator for Nova Chemicals in Sarnia. Bailey is also a Freemason.

== Politics ==
Prior to entering provincial politics, Bailey served as a councillor for Enniskillen, Ontario. In 2007 he ran in the 2007 provincial election for the Progressive Conservatives party. He defeated Liberal incumbent Caroline Di Cocco by 3,702 votes. He was re-elected in 2011 and again in 2014.

Bailey has served as critic for a number of areas including Labour and Training. As of 2014 he is the critic for Natural Resources. From 2011 to 2014 he served as Deputy Opposition Whip.

He is serving as the Parliamentary Assistant to the Minister of Government and Consumer Services.

== Election record ==
2025 Ontario general election: Sarnia—Lambton
Party	Candidate	Votes	%	±%	Expenditures
Progressive Conservative	Bob Bailey	22,726	51.32	–1.40	$36,693
New Democratic	Candace Young	8,716	19.68	–3.93	$12,483
Liberal	Rachel Willsie	8,134	18.37	+7.92	$17,540
New Blue	Keith Benn	1,876	4.24	–2.53	$9,310
Independent	Nathan Colquhoun	890	2.01	–	$200
Green	Pamela Reid	840	1.90	–1.25	$0
Libertarian	Jacques Boudreau	591	1.33	–	$0
Ontario Party	Mark Lamore	359	0.81	–0.06	$0
Populist	Tom Stoukas	151	0.34	–2.08	$0
Total valid votes/expense limit		44,283	99.18	–	$142,303
Total rejected, unmarked and declined ballots		367	0.82	+0.04	
Turnout		44,650	50.52	+3.83	
Eligible voters		88,387			
Progressive Conservative hold		Swing		+1.27	
Source: Elections Ontario

2022 Ontario general election: Sarnia—Lambton
Party	Candidate	Votes	%	±%	Expenditures
Progressive Conservative	Bob Bailey	21,184	52.72	–0.02	$29,549
New Democratic	Dylan Stelpstra	9,489	23.62	–13.75	$34,373
Liberal	Mark Russell	4,200	10.45	+6.03	$0
New Blue	Keith Benn	2,719	6.77	–	$13,739
Green	Mason Bourdeau	1,266	3.15	–0.50	$0
Populist	Carla Olson	972	2.42	–	$0
Ontario Party	Ian Orchard	351	0.87	–	$0
Total valid votes/expense limit		40,181	99.22	–	$121,429
Total rejected, unmarked and declined ballots		315	0.78	–0.19	
Turnout		40,496	46.69	–14.20	
Eligible voters		86,735			
Progressive Conservative hold		Swing		+6.86	
Source: Elections Ontario

2018 Ontario general election: Sarnia—Lambton
Party	Candidate	Votes	%	±%
Progressive Conservative	Bob Bailey	26,811	52.75	+11.73
New Democratic	Kathy Alexander	18,995	37.37	+1.60
Liberal	Neil Wereley	2,246	4.42	–13.44
Green	Kevin Shaw	1,856	3.65	–0.97
Trillium	Andy Bruziewicz	601	1.18	–
None of the Above	Jeff Lozier	250	0.49	–
No Affiliation	Fanina R. Kodre	71	0.14	–
Total valid votes		50,830	99.03	
Total rejected, unmarked and declined ballots		497	0.97	–0.36
Turnout		51,327	60.89	+3.54
Eligible voters		84,296		
Progressive Conservative hold		Swing		+5.07
Source: Elections Ontario

2014 Ontario general election: Sarnia—Lambton
Party	Candidate	Votes	%	±%
Progressive Conservative	Bob Bailey	18,720	41.09	-7.23
New Democratic	Brian White	16,274	35.73	+10.28
Liberal	Anne Marie Gillis	8,113	17.81	-3.97
Green	Kevin Shaw	2,106	4.62	+3.22
Libertarian	Andrew K. Falby	340	0.75	+0.35
Total valid votes		45,553	100.00	
Progressive Conservative hold		Swing		-8.76
Source: Elections Ontario

2011 Ontario general election: Sarnia—Lambton
Party	Candidate	Votes	%	±%
Progressive Conservative	Bob Bailey	19,570	48.32	+10.16
New Democratic	Brian White	10,307	25.45	-1.37
Liberal	Stephanie Barry	8,819	21.78	-7.63
Independent	Andy Bruziewicz	1,077	2.66	
Green	Jason Vermette	567	1.40	-4.22
Freedom	Andrew K. Falby	160	0.40	
Total valid votes		40,500	100.00	
Total rejected, unmarked and declined ballots		199	0.49	
Turnout		40,699	51.75	
Eligible voters		78,646		
Progressive Conservative hold		Swing		+5.77
Source: Elections Ontario

Ontario general election, 2007: Sarnia—Lambton
Party	Candidate	Votes	%	±%
Progressive Conservative	Bob Bailey	16,145	38.3	+7.31
Liberal	Caroline Di Cocco	12,443	29.4	-18.14
New Democratic	Barb Millitt	11,349	26.8	+9.85
Green	Tim van Bodegom	2,376	5.6	+1.90
