= Sarnia—Lambton =

Sarnia—Lambton may refer to:

- Sarnia—Lambton (provincial electoral district)
- Sarnia—Lambton (federal electoral district)
