= Victoria Hall (Petrolia) =

Building in Ontario, Canada

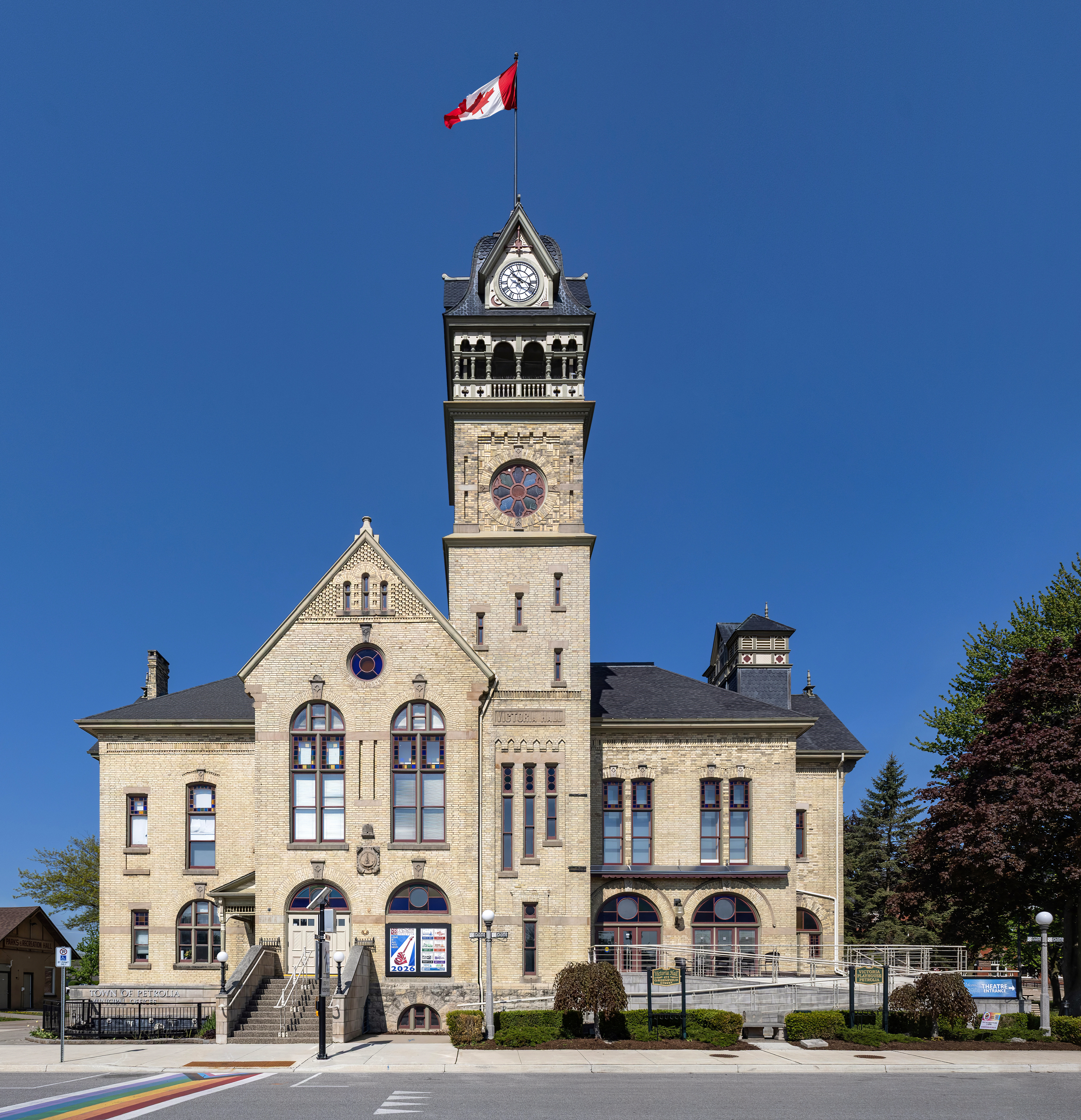
- Victoria Hall, 2026
- Interactive map of the Victoria Hall area

General information
- Architectural style: Eclectic (Queen Anne Revival and Gothic Revival)
- Location: 411 Greenfield Street, Petrolia, Ontario, Canada
- Coordinates: 42°52′52″N 82°8′48″W
- Year built: 1887–1889

Design and construction
- Architect: George F. Durand
- Designations: National Historic Site of Canada

Victoria Hall is a town hall and theatre in Petrolia, Ontario, Canada. Built between 1887 and 1889, when Petrolia was one of Canada's wealthiest towns due to its oil industry, the hall was designed by George F. Durand in a lavish and eclectic blend of the Queen Anne Revival and Gothic Revival styles. In its early years, the hall hosted numerous gatherings of Petrolia's elites, but by the 1930s it had fallen into disuse. After becoming increasingly dilapidated, Victoria Hall was renovated, first in the 1960s for the town council and again from 1972 to 1974 for Victoria Playhouse Petrolia. In 1975, Victoria Hall was designated a National Historic Site of Canada.

On January 25, 1989, a fire destroyed most of Victoria Hall's interior and damaged its exterior masonry. Although the construction of a new building was considered, ultimately the town council decided to renovate the hall. Victoria Hall was reopened in 1992, and has continued to host Petrolia's town council as well as theatrical performances.

== Description ==
Victoria Hall is located at 411 Greenfield Street in Petrolia, Ontario, Canada, part of the downtown core. It is identified as an example of Victorian-era eclecticism, blending influences from Queen Anne Revival as well as a Gothic Revival architecture. It covers an area of approximately 34 by 22 metres (110 by 72 ft).

The brick hall has an asymmetrical profile and varied roofline. It features a prominent off-centre clock tower, as well as a hipped-roofed centre block and cross-gabled wings. Windows are varied; most ground-level windows and door openings are round arches, while second-storey windows are generally elongated and narrow. The tower features lancet windows and brick corbels. Windows are of varied sizes and groupings. Entrances also likewise vary, with doubled doors used for the former firehouse and a gable bay framing access to the theatre.

Ornaments on the exterior include decorative brickwork as well as plaques depicting oil extraction and beehives. The clock tower is topped with a belvedere, with ornamental brick- and woodwork. A smaller tower, once used for drying firehoses, includes a chimney, finial, and gable.

== History ==
=== Construction ===
Oil was discovered in Petrolia in 1860. By the 1880s, the town—incorporated in 1874—had become one of Canada's wealthiest due to decades of oil exploration and exploitation. Petrolia decided to commission a town hall, with its earliest plans proposed in 1881. Although CA$13,000 (equivalent to $400,000 in 2025) was allocated for the new building, the town council ultimately rejected the plan. It continued to meet at the Oil Exchange Hall, built in 1871.

In 1886, the question of a new town hall was revisited when existing facilities were deemed inadequate. The following year, Petrolia's town council approved up to CA$20,000 (equivalent to $800,000 in 2025) for a new meeting space. It commissioned George F. Durand, based in London, Ontario, to design a town hall that reflected the town's prosperity. Durand also completed several churches and a Masonic Hall in Petrolia, and at the time was working on several projects in Southwestern Ontario, including the Perth County Courthouse in Stratford.

Construction was completed in January 1889, with the project costing approximately CA$35,000 (equivalent to $1,300,000 in 2025). This expense was controversial, with critics deeming the project excessively lavish. The completed building included numerous facilities, including an armoury, courtroom, fire department, jail, and municipal offices. At the town's insistence, the building also included a 1,000-seat opera house; such combined civic and performance spaces had previously been used in places such as Aylmer, Paisley, and Whitby. The inauguration ceremony was held in the opera house on January 3, 1889, and featured vocal performances as well as poetry readings. Most participants were local residents.

=== Dilapidation and restoration ===
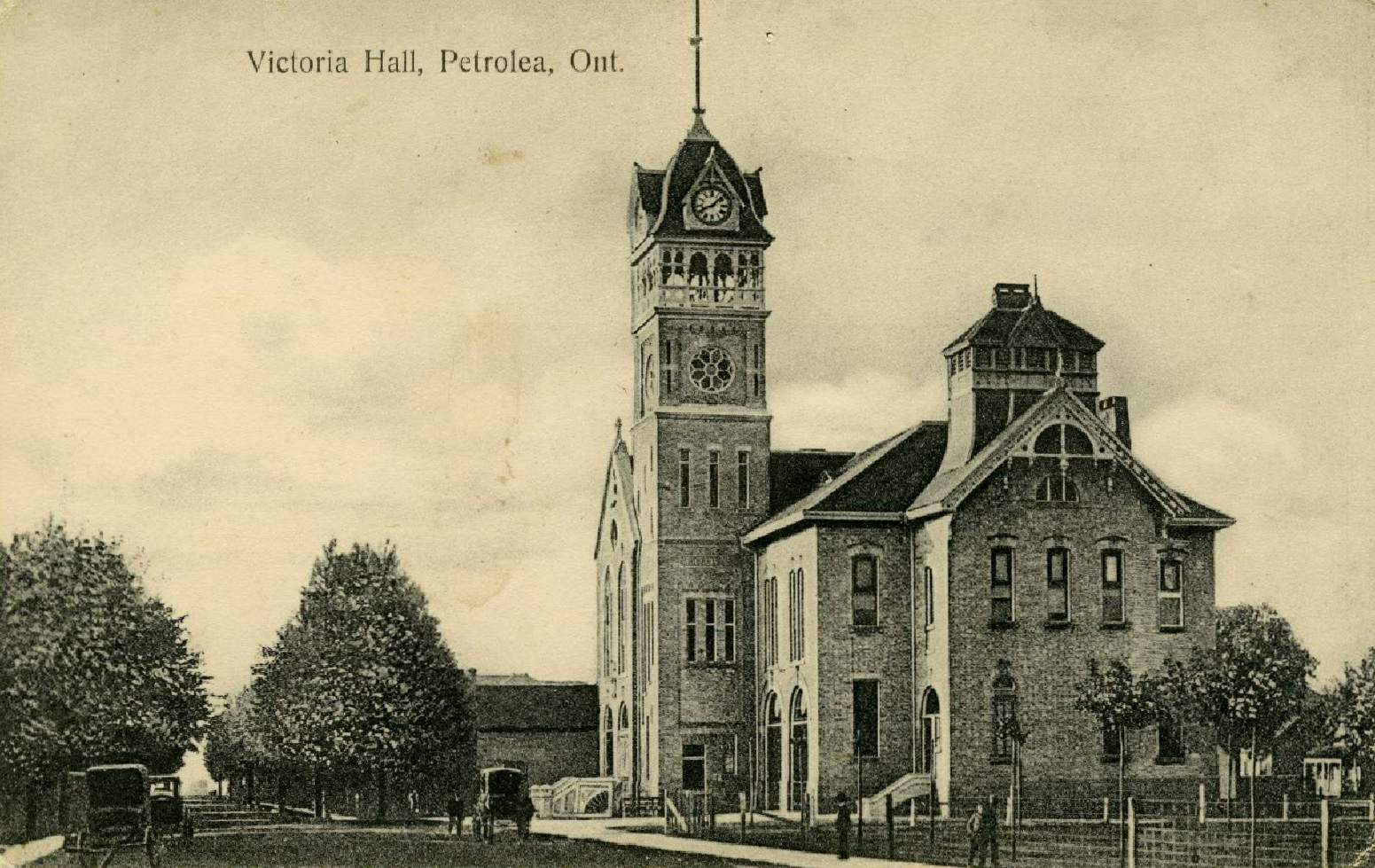
Victoria Hall on a c. 1900 postcard

Through the 1890s, Victoria Hall hosted assemblies that attracted visitors from Canada, the United States, and Austria, as well as dress balls for Petrolia's elites. Several theatrical performances were also staged at the hall, with the earliest being Dr. Jekyll and Mr. Hyde in 1889. The economic boom that produced Victoria Hall ended in 1898, when Imperial Oil left the town. Although the hall remained in use, the building became increasingly dilapidated, and in the 1920s other venues were more popular. By 1930 use was mostly discontinued, though sporadic theatrical performances and dances are recorded.

Renovations were undertaken in 1960, allowing for more of Victoria Hall to be used for municipal operations. In 1972, a group of community members hired the Toronto-based firm Brian Arnott Associates to consult on transforming the opera house into a theatre. Although Arnott noted that extensive work would be required, including rebuilding the roof to support lighting equipment and adding a control room and fire escape, he recommended undertaking the project, noting the similar success of Shaw Theatre in Niagara-on-the-Lake. To raise funds for this project, Victoria Playhouse Petrolia (VPP) was established as a charitable foundation in 1973. As a fundraising mechanism, it began stage performances that November. Its first show, Paul Thompson's Them Donnellys—based on a historic murder case—was staged by the Theatre Passe Muraille and sold 1,390 tickets.

The town council endorsed the restoration of Victoria Hall. Funds came in part through a government grant of CA$138,500 (equivalent to $964,000 in 2025) and in part through some CA$90,250 (equivalent to $644,000 in 2025) raised by the VPP. Renovation work was completed by the Toronto-based architect Howard Walker, and undertaken in two phases. During the first, the balcony was reinforced and new washrooms were added, while existing stairways were reworked. In the second phase, theatrical equipment and air conditioning were added to the theatre, while the fire hall was transformed into a foyer. Capacity was reduced to about 500 seats, in part due to changing standards. The Petrolia fire department left Victoria Hall for a new location on Centre Street. On November 1, 1975, the theatre was officially opened by Lieutenant-Governor of Ontario Pauline McGibbon. That year, Victoria Hall was also designated a National Historic Site of Canada.

According to playhouse artistic director Robert Izett, some CA$480,000 (equivalent to $2,346,000 in 2025) had been spent on restoring Victoria Hall by 1977. Several further renovations were undertaken in the 1980s, including a 1983 refurbishing of the clock tower, the modification of the entrance for improved accessibility, and the addition of a glass foyer. By 1986, the building included an art gallery and a convention centre. During this period, Victoria Hall hosted various performers, including ballerina Karen Kain, the Canadian Opera Company, the comedy troupe CODCO, and the children's show Mr. Dressup. The playhouse was also used by several alternative theatre groups. A study conducted by the University of Waterloo in the late 1980s found that the troupe brought at least CA$250,000 (equivalent to $549,000 in 2025) in revenue to Petrolia and its surrounding area per annum.

=== Fire and subsequent history ===
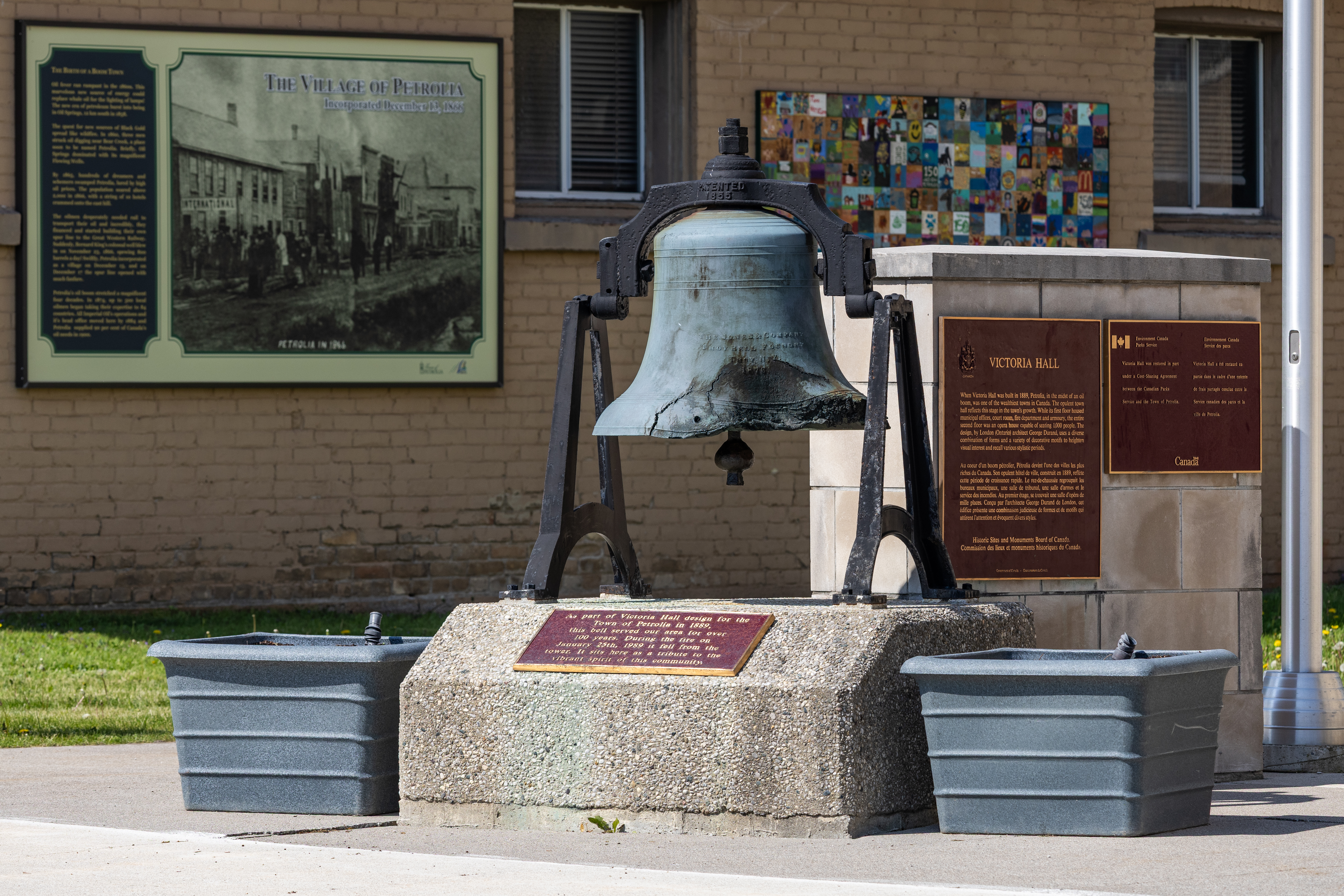
The bell from Victoria Hall, damaged during the 1989 fire

On January 25, 1989, three weeks after celebrating its centennial, Victoria Hall was devastated by a fire that originated in its basement. Most of the interior was destroyed, as were most archival documents, though the exterior brickwork survived. The town received an insurance settlement of CA$4 million (equivalent to $8,800,000 in 2025), and residents debated building an entirely new town hall or restoring the earlier design; the estimated cost of restoration was CA$7 million (equivalent to $14,700,000 in 2025) in 1990. Mayor Marcel Beaubien stated in a January 26 speech, "We cannot mortgage the future of the Town of Petrolia to restore the building".

Ultimately, Petrolia decided to refurbish the building, agreeing to a proposal to restore Victoria Hall together with a 316-square-metre (3,400 sq ft) addition. Although the initial proposal called for a 500-seat theatre, capacity was reduced to 425 seats. Rebuilding began on November 19, 1990, and was handled by Quadrangle Architects, with a final cost of CA$6.5 million (equivalent to $12,700,000 in 2025). Of this, CA$750,000 (equivalent to $1,470,000 in 2025) had been raised by the community, with the remainder coming from the insurance settlement and government grants. Several elements of the earlier renovations, including the glass foyer, were not rebuilt. Although the Victorian exterior was retained, interior elements were updated with more recent technology, including new acoustics in the playhouse.

Victoria Hall reopened on September 20, 1992. Municipal services continued to be provided, with council chambers, meeting rooms, and offices in the building. Despite early uncertainty, the VPP continued to occupy the theatre, with other parts of the top floor used for its offices and storage. By 2002, it recorded 40,000 tickets sold per annum, which had increased to 50,000 by 2023. Exhibitions inside the hall included artifacts from the oil boom as well as albums of photographs.

Since the 2010s, Petrolia has sought to expand Victoria Hall. It installed new stained glass windows by Christopher Wallis in 2011. In 2017, the town announced its intent to undertake a feasibility study for an expansion. In 2023, Petrolia approved a CA$3.5 million renovation to install a second elevator, add new washrooms, and expand storage space, with funding expected to be obtained partially through grants. This project was expected to address accessibility concerns and ameliorate washroom queues during theatrical performances.

== Works cited ==
- "Back from the Ashes: Victoria Hall Set to Open in September". Standard-Freeholder. Cornwall, Ontario. May 25, 1992. p. 54 – via newspapers.com.
- Boughner, Bob (June 25, 2005). "Victoria Playhouse an Entertainment Gem: Thousands of Patrons Visit Historic Theatre". Chatham Daily News. p. 6. ProQuest 353494644 – via ProQuest.
- Burr, Christina Ann (2006). Canada's Victorian Oil Town: The Transformation of Petrolia from Resource Town into a Victorian Community. Montreal: McGill-Queen's University Press. ISBN 978-0-7735-7590-5.
- Fairfield, Robert (1990). "Theatres and Performance Halls". In Saddlemyer, Anne (ed.). Early Stages: Theatre in Ontario 1800-1914. Toronto: University of Toronto Press. pp. 214–271. ISBN 978-1-4875-8672-0.
- Gervais, Marty (August 4, 1990). "Time Running Out for Victoria Hall". The Windsor Star. p. C1. ProQuest 253859918 – via ProQuest.
- Keenan, Mike (July 6, 2013). "Oil's Well in Petrolia". The Standard. St. Catherines, Ontario. p. C7.
- Kula, Tyler (February 19, 2019). "Three Decades After the Fire; Petrolia Marks 30th Anniversary of Victoria Hall Fire as part of Petrolia Family Fun Days". Sarnia Observer. p. A3. ProQuest 2183505973 – via ProQuest.
- MacRae, Marion; Adamson, Anthony (1983). Cornerstones of Order: Courthouses and Town Halls of Ontario, 1784-1914. Toronto: Clarke Irwin Inc. ISBN 978-0-7720-1387-3.
- Morden, Paul (December 23, 2023). "Renovations Planned to Give Petrolia's Victoria Hall a Lift, or Two". Sarnia Observer. Archived from the original on April 22, 2026.
- Rose, Sid (February 19, 1977). "Victoria Playhouse Petrolia Inc.: Turning a Sow's Ear into a Silk Purse". The Windsor Star. Windsor, Ontario. p. 8 – via newspapers.com.
- Schilz, Melissa (September 12, 2017). "Victoria Hall's Silver Jubilee Set for Sept. 23". Petrolia Topic. ProQuest 2169237150 – via ProQuest.
- Schilz, Melissa (September 18, 2017). "New Vision for Petrolia's Victoria Hall". Sarnia Observer. p. A2. ProQuest 2226772070 – via ProQuest.
- Tausky, Nancy Z.; Distefano, Lynne D. (2018). Victorian Architecture in London and Southwestern Ontario: Symbols of Aspiration. Toronto: University of Toronto Press. ISBN 978-1-4875-8257-9. JSTOR 10.3138/j.ctvfrxbbj.
- "Victoria Hall". Canada's Historic Places. Parks Canada. Archived from the original on April 6, 2026.
- Vugt, Harry van (July 16, 1977). "Petrolia: Small-Town Theatre, Big-Time Ambitions". The Windsor Star. Windsor, Ontario. p. 35 – via newspapers.com.
- Whipp, Ted (January 25, 1989). "Fire Hits Petrolia Town Hall". The Windsor Star. p. A2. ProQuest 253756636 – via ProQuest.
- Williams, Patricia (February 1, 2002). "Toronto Firm's Projects Looking, Sounding Good". Daily Commercial News and Construction Record. Vol. 75, no. 23. Toronto. p. A1. ProQuest 224240236 – via ProQuest.
