= 2007 Ontario general election =

Canadian provincial election

- October 10, 2007

107 seats in the 39th Legislative Assembly of Ontario 54 seats were needed for a majority
- Turnout: 52.8% (▼4.07pp)
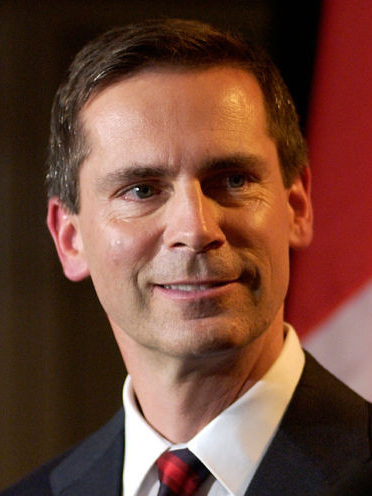

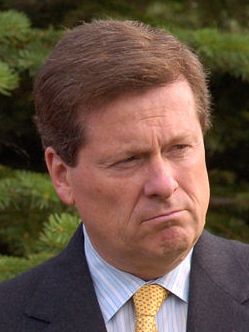

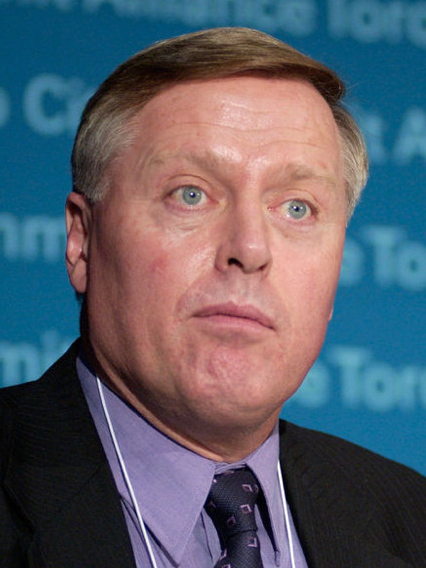

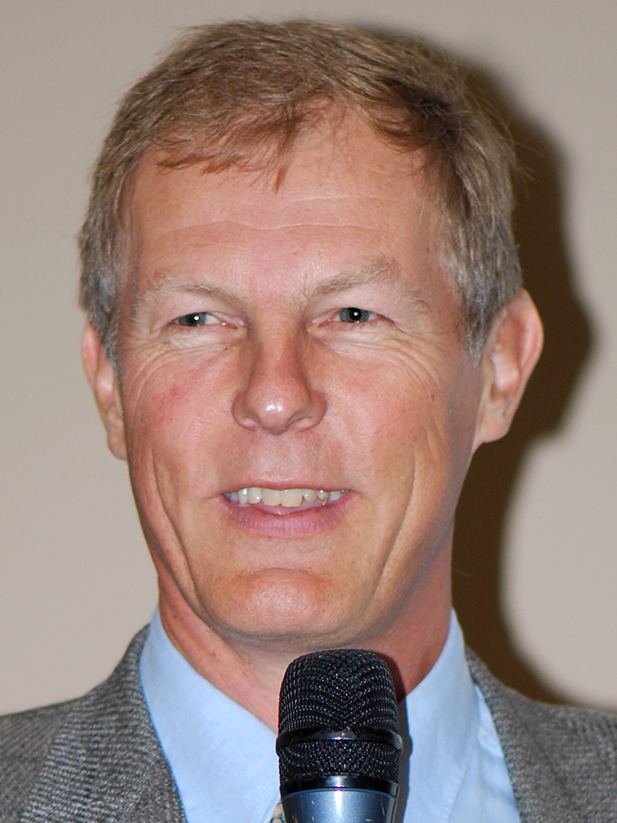
	First party	Second party
Leader	Dalton McGuinty	John Tory
Party	Liberal	Progressive Conservative
Leader since	December 1, 1996	September 18, 2004
Leader's seat	Ottawa South	Ran in Don Valley West (lost) (Note: Tory represented Dufferin—Peel—Wellington—Grey in the previous legislature though did not seek re-election, opting to run in Don Valley West instead.)
Last election	72 seats, 46.47%	24 seats, 34.67%
Seats before	67	25
Seats won	71	26
Seat change	▲4	▲1
Popular vote	1,869,273	1,398,806
Percentage	42.25%	31.62%
Swing	▼4.22pp	▼3.05pp
	Third party	Fourth party
Leader	Howard Hampton	Frank de Jong
Party	New Democratic	Green
Leader since	June 22, 1996	1993
Leader's seat	Kenora—Rainy River	Ran in Davenport (lost)
Last election	7 seats, 14.69%	0 seats, 2.81%
Seats before	10	0
Seats won	10	0
Seat change	Steady	Steady
Popular vote	741,465	354,897
Percentage	16.76%	8.02%
Swing	▲2.07pp	▲5.21pp
- Popular vote by riding. As this is an FPTP election, seat totals are not determined by popular vote, but instead via results by each riding. Riding names are listed at the bottom.
Premier before election
Dalton McGuinty
Liberal
Premier after election
Dalton McGuinty
Liberal

General elections were held on October 10, 2007, to elect members (MPPs) of the 39th Legislative Assembly of the province of Ontario, Canada. The Liberals under Premier Dalton McGuinty won the election with a majority government, winning 71 out of a possible 107 seats with 42.2% of the popular vote. The election saw the third-lowest voter turnout in Ontario provincial elections, setting a then record for the lowest voter turnout with 52.8% of people who were eligible voted. This broke the previous record of 54.7% in the 1923 election, but would end up being surpassed in the 2011 and 2022 elections.

As a result of legislation passed by the Legislature in 2004, election dates are now fixed by formula so that an election is held approximately four years after the previous election, unless the government is defeated by a vote of "no confidence" in the Legislature. Previously, the governing party had considerable flexibility to determine the date of an election anywhere up to five years of being elected. The date of this election was originally presumed to be October 4, 2007; however, the law fixes the date on the first Thursday of October or on any day within seven days thereof if required to accommodate a date of "religious or cultural significance". The date was set as October 10, 2007, to avoid a conflict with the Jewish holiday of Shemini Atzeret, which fell on October 4, 2007.

In the same election, there was a provincial referendum on whether to change from first-past-the-post to mixed member proportional representation, as recommended by the Ontario Citizens' Assembly on Electoral Reform. This measure failed, with 37% of the participating electorate and 5 out of 107 ridings voting for the new system; a 60% supermajority was required province-wide, with at least 2/3 of the ridings also supporting it by a simple majority.

== Issues ==
Although all four parties released a variety of detailed platform proposals, the campaign was dominated almost entirely by John Tory's promise to extend public funding to Ontario's faith-based schools.

In Ontario at present, the Catholic school system is fully funded in the same manner as public schools. However, other religious schools, such as Jewish, Muslim or other Christian schools, are not funded by the province. This discrepancy has been cited as discriminatory by both the Supreme Court of Canada and the United Nations Human Rights Committee, although to date the province has taken no action to change its existing school funding policies, on the grounds that Catholic school funding in the province is mandated by the Constitution of Canada.

Tory's proposal to extend funding to religious schools was controversial, with polls confirming that a clear majority of Ontarians opposed the proposal. Even some of Tory's own caucus, most notably Bill Murdoch and Garfield Dunlop, openly criticized the proposal during the election campaign. After heavy opposition, Tory changed his position later in the campaign, promising a free vote on the issue.

The Liberals and the NDP were both opposed to non-Catholic religious school funding, while the Green Party proposed eliminating the province's existing Catholic school funding in favour of a single public school board. Liberal opposition to non-Catholic religious school funding, especially private Muslim schools, appealed to Islamophobic sentiment in the province.

There was a brief flurry of interest in health care issues when John Tory emphasized his support for an increasing role for the private sector in health care.

In the final week of the campaign, NDP leader Howard Hampton criticized the media for focusing almost entirely on religious schools and virtually ignoring other issues.

== Redistribution ==
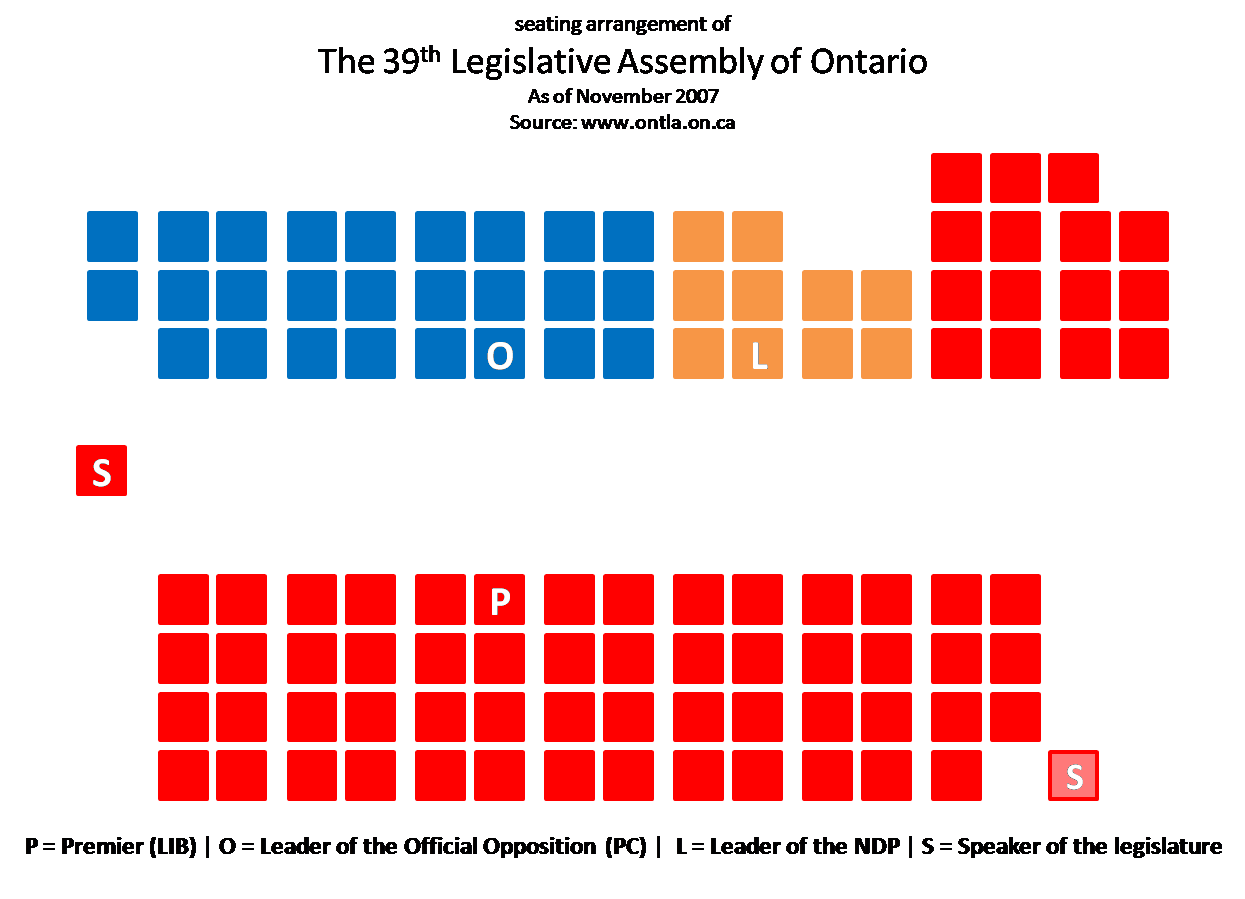
Seat distribution and arrangement in the Ontario Legislative Assembly.

With the passing of Bill 214 and the Representation Act, 2005 in the year 2005, Ontario's electoral boundaries were no longer identical to the federal electoral boundaries. The province was now divided into 11 northern electoral districts that were identical, except for a minor boundary adjustment, to the ones that existed on October 2, 2003, and 96 southern electoral districts that were identical to their federal counterparts as they existed on September 1, 2004.

The 11 northern electoral districts were: Algoma—Manitoulin, Kenora—Rainy River, Nickel Belt, Nipissing, Parry Sound—Muskoka, Sault Ste. Marie, Sudbury, Thunder Bay—Atikokan, Thunder Bay—Superior North, Timiskaming—Cochrane, and Timmins—James Bay.

As a result of the redistribution, none of the three major parties took fewer seats than it held at the dissolution of the previous legislature. The Liberals and the Progressive Conservatives each gained seats, while the New Democratic Party's seat total remained unchanged.

== Contests ==
Candidate contests in the ridings
Candidates nominated	Ridings	Party										
Candidates nominated	Ridings	Lib	PC	NDP	Green	FCP	Ind	Ltn	Free	Comm	Oth (Note: Minor political parties fielding fewer than eight candidates are aggregated together.)	Totals
4	17	17	17	17	17	0	0	0	0	0	0	68
5	38	38	38	38	38	33	2	2	1	0	0	190
6	32	32	32	32	32	32	10	10	4	4	4	192
7	12	12	12	12	12	12	9	7	6	2	0	84
8	7	7	7	7	7	6	9	5	4	1	3	56
9	1	1	1	1	1	0	2	1	0	1	1	9
Totals	107	107	107	107	107	83	32	25	15	8	8	599

== Results ==
Summary of the Legislative Assembly of Ontario election results
Party	Party leader	Candidates	Seats				Popular vote		
Party	Party leader	Candidates	2003	Dissol.	2007	Change	#	%	Change
Liberal	Dalton McGuinty	107	72	67	71	+6.0%	1,869,273	42.25%	-4.22%
Progressive Conservative	John Tory	107	24	25	26	+4.0%	1,398,806	31.62%	-3.05%
New Democratic	Howard Hampton	107	7	10	10	-	741,465	16.77%	+2.08%
Green	Frank de Jong	107	-	-	-	-	354,897	8.02%	+5.20%
Family Coalition	Giuseppe Gori	83	-	-	-	-	35,702	0.81%	+0.01%
Libertarian	Sam Apelbaum	25	-	-	-	-	9,249	0.21%	+0.17%
Freedom	Paul McKeever	15	-	-	-	-	3,003	0.07%	-0.13%
Communist	Elizabeth Rowley	8	-	-	-	-	1,603	0.04%	-0.01%
Special Needs	Danish Ahmed	2	-	-	-	-	502	0.01%	-
Confederation of Regions	Eileen Butson	2	-	-	-	-	446	0.01%	+0.00%
Reform	Brad Harness	2	-	-	-	-	354	0.01%	-
Republican	Trueman Tuck	2	-	-	-	-	272	0.01%	-
Independents and no affiliation		32	-	-	-	-	8,326	0.19%	-0.11%
Vacant				1					
Total			103	103	107	8,380,551	4,423,898	100%	-

- Two independent candidates are running for the unregistered Communist League, while two others are perennial candidates of the Communist Party of Canada (Marxist–Leninist).
- Eileen Butson, party president, acted as the CoR's spokesperson as the party decided not to have a party leader.

=== Vote and seat summaries ===
Ternary plots - shift of electoral support (2003-2007)
2003

2007
Electoral districts identified by colours of winning parties

Popular vote
Liberal	42.25%
PC	31.62%
New Democratic	16.77%
Green	8.02%
Others	1.34%

Seats summary
Liberal	66.36%
PC	24.30%
New Democratic	9.35%

=== Synopsis of results ===
Results by riding - 2007 Ontario general election
Riding	Winning party							Turnout (Note: including spoilt ballots)	Votes (Note: minor political parties receiving less than 1% of the popular vote are aggregated under "Other"; independent candidates are aggregated separately)						
Riding	2003	1st place	Votes	Share	Margin #	Margin %	2nd place	Turnout	Lib	PC	NDP	Green	Ind	Other	Total
Ajax—Pickering	New	Lib	19,857	49.07%	5,959	14.73%	PC	49.34%	19,857	13,898	3,275	3,067	-	368	40,465
Algoma—Manitoulin	Lib	Lib	11,361	42.56%	1,498	5.61%	NDP	54.49%	11,361	3,744	9,863	1,374	-	354	26,696
Ancaster—Dundas—Flamborough—Westdale	Lib	Lib	20,445	41.16%	3,353	6.75%	PC	58.12%	20,445	17,092	6,814	4,112	222	985	49,670
Barrie	PC	Lib	19,548	42.20%	1,381	2.98%	PC	51.95%	19,548	18,167	3,700	4,385	179	341	46,320
Beaches—East York	NDP	NDP	17,522	44.32%	7,307	18.48%	Lib	54.37%	10,215	6,166	17,522	4,785	-	851	39,539
Bramalea—Gore—Malton	Lib	Lib	19,106	47.00%	7,172	17.64%	PC	43.65%	19,106	11,934	5,016	4,120	-	471	40,647
Brampton—Springdale	Lib	Lib	17,673	50.66%	6,965	19.97%	PC	43.45%	17,673	10,708	3,800	2,292	-	410	34,883
Brampton West	Lib	Lib	20,746	46.19%	5,626	12.53%	PC	43.92%	20,746	15,120	4,901	3,471	185	488	44,911
Brant	Lib	Lib	23,485	49.16%	9,698	20.30%	PC	52.69%	23,485	13,787	6,536	3,272	289	403	47,772
Bruce—Grey—Owen Sound	PC	PC	21,156	46.61%	6,117	13.48%	Green	59.96%	6,774	21,156	1,721	15,039	-	695	45,385
Burlington	PC	PC	21,578	41.34%	1,854	3.55%	Lib	58.91%	19,724	21,578	5,728	4,779	-	391	52,200
Cambridge	PC	PC	17,942	41.70%	3,238	7.52%	Lib	49.69%	14,704	17,942	5,896	3,842	-	646	43,030
Carleton—Mississippi Mills	PC	PC	25,126	47.83%	8,350	15.89%	Lib	55.30%	16,776	25,126	4,002	5,517	-	1,112	52,533
Chatham-Kent—Essex	Lib	Lib	18,782	51.98%	8,415	23.29%	PC	48.81%	18,782	10,367	4,601	2,054	-	326	36,130
Davenport	Lib	Lib	12,467	41.82%	1,587	5.32%	NDP	45.84%	12,467	2,805	10,880	3,047	114	500	29,813
Don Valley East	Lib	Lib	19,667	55.63%	10,789	30.52%	PC	51.30%	19,667	8,878	3,759	2,287	467	297	35,355
Don Valley West	Lib	Lib	23,080	50.44%	4,924	10.76%	PC	59.20%	23,080	18,156	2,138	2,202	-	183	45,759
Dufferin—Caledon	PC	PC	16,522	41.85%	3,884	9.84%	Lib	52.50%	12,638	16,522	3,893	6,430	-	-	39,483
Durham	PC	PC	21,515	46.96%	6,785	14.81%	Lib	54.34%	14,730	21,515	5,521	4,053	-	-	45,819
Eglinton—Lawrence	Lib	Lib	17,402	43.23%	2,145	5.33%	PC	55.62%	17,402	15,257	4,039	2,871	90	594	40,253
Elgin—Middlesex—London	Lib	Lib	20,085	49.10%	7,625	18.64%	PC	53.09%	20,085	12,460	4,643	3,363	-	353	40,904
Essex	Lib	Lib	19,970	48.02%	9,570	23.01%	PC	48.69%	19,970	10,400	8,638	2,220	-	358	41,586
Etobicoke Centre	Lib	Lib	22,939	50.07%	7,272	15.87%	PC	59.40%	22,939	15,667	3,847	3,357	-	-	45,810
Etobicoke—Lakeshore	Lib	Lib	20,218	45.99%	6,736	15.32%	PC	53.62%	20,218	13,482	5,837	3,467	480	478	43,962
Etobicoke North	Lib	Lib	15,147	54.85%	9,346	33.84%	PC	45.19%	15,147	5,801	4,101	1,312	-	1,255	27,616
Glengarry—Prescott—Russell	Lib	Lib	24,345	60.51%	13,418	33.35%	PC	52.80%	24,345	10,927	2,281	2,344	-	337	40,234
Guelph	Lib	Lib	20,346	40.92%	8,166	16.42%	PC	57.03%	20,346	12,180	6,880	9,750	-	571	49,727
Haldimand—Norfolk	PC	PC	26,135	60.92%	16,599	38.69%	Lib	56.25%	9,536	26,135	4,546	2,230	-	457	42,904
Haliburton—Kawartha Lakes—Brock	PC	PC	24,273	49.99%	9,946	20.49%	Lib	59.22%	14,327	24,273	5,785	3,475	-	692	48,552
Halton	PC	PC	22,677	41.84%	176	0.32%	Lib	51.53%	22,501	22,677	4,160	4,376	-	487	54,201
Hamilton Centre	New	NDP	17,176	44.72%	6,080	15.83%	Lib	48.63%	11,096	5,673	17,176	3,610	-	852	38,407
Hamilton East—Stoney Creek	Lib	NDP	16,272	37.65%	1,210	2.80%	Lib	51.36%	15,062	9,310	16,272	2,122	-	452	43,218
Hamilton Mountain	Lib	Lib	17,387	37.24%	1,734	3.71%	NDP	53.33%	17,387	10,982	15,653	2,172	-	493	46,687
Huron—Bruce	Lib	Lib	20,469	45.95%	6,863	15.41%	PC	59.80%	20,469	13,606	5,932	2,911	595	1,035	44,548
Kenora—Rainy River	NDP	NDP	14,281	60.62%	8,529	36.20%	Lib	46.16%	5,752	2,757	14,281	769	-	-	23,559
Kingston and the Islands	Lib	Lib	23,277	47.23%	12,276	24.91%	PC	53.96%	23,277	11,001	10,129	4,321	-	556	49,284
Kitchener Centre	Lib	Lib	17,484	45.90%	7,767	20.39%	PC	49.58%	17,484	9,717	6,707	3,162	425	599	38,094
Kitchener—Conestoga	New	Lib	16,315	41.82%	1,865	4.78%	PC	49.25%	16,315	14,450	4,545	2,805	-	901	39,016
Kitchener—Waterloo	PC	PC	20,748	40.84%	4,900	9.65%	Lib	53.63%	15,848	20,748	8,902	4,707	-	598	50,803
Lambton—Kent—Middlesex	Lib	Lib	18,228	43.27%	2,933	6.96%	PC	55.18%	18,228	15,295	4,520	3,329	-	758	42,130
Lanark—Frontenac—Lennox and Addington	New	PC	18,213	40.58%	820	1.83%	Lib	52.08%	17,393	18,213	5,623	3,186	-	462	44,877
Leeds—Grenville	PC	PC	22,755	56.24%	11,153	27.56%	Lib	55.11%	11,602	22,755	2,821	2,907	-	377	40,462
London—Fanshawe	Lib	Lib	13,742	38.68%	3,982	11.21%	PC	48.21%	13,742	9,760	9,350	2,548	129	-	35,529
London North Centre	Lib	Lib	21,669	47.17%	10,772	23.45%	PC	50.00%	21,669	10,897	7,649	5,720	-	-	45,935
London West	Lib	Lib	25,967	52.42%	13,956	28.18%	PC	57.83%	25,967	12,011	5,562	5,184	201	607	49,532
Markham—Unionville	Lib	Lib	21,149	59.47%	11,575	32.55%	PC	40.51%	21,149	9,574	2,597	1,910	-	335	35,565
Mississauga—Brampton South	New	Lib	19,738	53.78%	10,405	28.35%	PC	42.46%	19,738	9,333	3,785	3,846	-	0	36,702
Mississauga East—Cooksville	Lib	Lib	22,249	58.93%	13,534	35.85%	PC	47.48%	22,249	8,715	3,192	2,361	-	1,235	37,752
Mississauga—Erindale	Lib	Lib	21,551	47.85%	6,638	14.74%	PC	47.08%	21,551	14,913	5,056	3,521	-	-	45,041
Mississauga South	Lib	Lib	19,195	46.68%	5,008	12.18%	PC	54.08%	19,195	14,187	3,745	3,629	-	365	41,121
Mississauga—Streetsville	Lib	Lib	20,264	52.55%	9,109	23.62%	PC	45.63%	20,264	11,155	3,944	2,925	-	274	38,562
Nepean—Carleton	PC	PC	27,070	50.28%	9,339	17.35%	Lib	54.61%	17,731	27,070	4,000	4,500	-	533	53,834
Newmarket—Aurora	PC	PC	19,460	42.72%	1,355	2.97%	Lib	55.21%	18,105	19,460	3,290	4,182	-	518	45,555
Niagara Falls	Lib	Lib	22,210	47.53%	7,670	16.41%	PC	51.08%	22,210	14,540	4,605	5,373	-	-	46,728
Niagara West—Glanbrook	PC	PC	24,311	51.06%	10,021	21.05%	Lib	58.57%	14,290	24,311	5,809	3,206	-	-	47,616
Nickel Belt	NDP	NDP	15,126	46.59%	2,762	8.51%	Lib	53.56%	12,364	3,263	15,126	1,374	-	341	32,468
Nipissing	Lib	Lib	13,781	42.11%	458	1.40%	PC	56.79%	13,781	13,323	4,136	1,248	-	238	32,726
Northumberland—Quinte West	Lib	Lib	22,287	45.37%	6,957	14.16%	PC	54.92%	22,287	15,330	6,492	5,012	-	-	49,121
Oak Ridges—Markham	New	Lib	28,564	48.22%	7,197	12.15%	PC	47.77%	28,564	21,367	4,698	3,815	342	455	59,241
Oakville	Lib	Lib	23,761	49.81%	7,102	14.89%	PC	58.26%	23,761	16,659	3,091	3,916	-	279	47,706
Oshawa	PC	PC	15,977	39.02%	2,495	6.09%	NDP	48.94%	8,762	15,977	13,482	2,474	-	253	40,948
Ottawa Centre	Lib	Lib	18,255	34.91%	2,094	4.00%	NDP	58.25%	18,255	10,416	16,161	6,458	283	720	52,293
Ottawa—Orléans	Lib	Lib	25,649	52.86%	8,954	18.45%	PC	57.86%	25,649	16,695	3,088	2,214	-	875	48,521
Ottawa South	Lib	Lib	24,015	50.13%	9,809	20.48%	PC	56.60%	24,015	14,206	4,467	3,902	-	1,311	47,901
Ottawa—Vanier	Lib	Lib	20,954	50.96%	11,785	28.66%	PC	51.49%	20,954	9,169	6,049	4,293	255	396	41,116
Ottawa West—Nepean	Lib	Lib	23,842	50.64%	8,871	18.84%	PC	57.51%	23,842	14,971	4,564	2,903	207	592	47,079
Oxford	PC	PC	18,445	47.27%	6,990	17.91%	Lib	53.72%	11,455	18,445	4,421	3,441	659	601	39,022
Parkdale—High Park	Lib	NDP	18,194	44.71%	6,294	15.47%	Lib	57.43%	11,900	6,024	18,194	3,938	-	638	40,694
Parry Sound—Muskoka	PC	PC	17,348	47.22%	7,529	20.49%	Lib	56.76%	9,819	17,348	5,015	4,557	-	-	36,739
Perth—Wellington	Lib	Lib	18,096	46.65%	5,758	14.84%	PC	54.62%	18,096	12,338	3,912	3,051	217	1,175	38,789
Peterborough	Lib	Lib	24,466	47.72%	11,290	22.02%	PC	57.47%	24,466	13,176	8,523	4,473	-	634	51,272
Pickering—Scarborough East	Lib	Lib	19,762	48.63%	6,878	16.92%	PC	54.01%	19,762	12,884	4,563	2,572	275	585	40,641
Prince Edward—Hastings	New	Lib	20,963	46.36%	6,123	13.54%	PC	54.16%	20,963	14,840	6,287	2,663	-	463	45,216
Renfrew—Nipissing—Pembroke	PC	PC	24,975	62.34%	15,070	37.62%	Lib	57.55%	9,905	24,975	3,038	1,777	-	368	40,063
Richmond Hill	New	Lib	19,456	47.83%	5,329	13.10%	PC	47.23%	19,456	14,127	3,565	3,210	-	318	40,676
St. Catharines	Lib	Lib	21,029	47.23%	8,165	18.34%	PC	53.83%	21,029	12,864	7,069	3,152	-	406	44,520
St. Paul's	Lib	Lib	21,280	47.43%	9,370	20.88%	PC	55.99%	21,280	11,910	7,061	3,744	328	545	44,868
Sarnia—Lambton	Lib	PC	16,145	38.16%	3,702	8.75%	Lib	55.20%	12,443	16,145	11,349	2,376	-	-	42,313
Sault Ste. Marie	Lib	Lib	19,316	60.13%	10,841	33.75%	NDP	55.56%	19,316	2,349	8,475	1,377	-	605	32,122
Scarborough—Agincourt	Lib	Lib	19,541	58.08%	11,010	32.72%	PC	46.01%	19,541	8,531	3,531	1,511	-	532	33,646
Scarborough Centre	Lib	Lib	17,775	53.66%	9,455	28.55%	PC	48.06%	17,775	8,320	4,401	1,827	-	800	33,123
Scarborough—Guildwood	Lib	Lib	14,430	42.52%	4,927	14.52%	PC	51.28%	14,430	9,503	7,441	1,811	-	751	33,936
Scarborough—Rouge River	Lib	Lib	22,307	65.06%	17,347	50.59%	PC	41.82%	22,307	4,960	4,691	1,276	-	1,055	34,289
Scarborough Southwest	Lib	Lib	15,114	46.15%	6,755	20.63%	PC	49.70%	15,114	8,359	5,930	2,649	-	695	32,747
Simcoe—Grey	PC	PC	24,270	50.65%	11,823	24.67%	Lib	54.86%	12,447	24,270	4,417	5,428	273	1,085	47,920
Simcoe North	PC	PC	22,986	49.82%	8,892	19.27%	Lib	54.06%	14,094	22,986	4,240	4,709	-	112	46,141
Stormont—Dundas—South Glengarry	Lib	Lib	18,660	48.86%	3,866	10.12%	PC	51.81%	18,660	14,794	2,813	1,680	-	247	38,194
Sudbury	Lib	Lib	19,307	58.77%	10,393	31.64%	NDP	51.11%	19,307	2,605	8,914	1,608	124	293	32,851
Thornhill	Lib	PC	22,244	45.92%	1,725	3.56%	Lib	52.17%	20,519	22,244	2,657	2,507	158	356	48,441
Thunder Bay—Atikokan	Lib	Lib	10,928	37.69%	50	0.17%	NDP	52.36%	10,928	5,918	10,878	1,270	-	-	28,994
Thunder Bay—Superior North	Lib	Lib	13,373	46.78%	2,435	8.52%	NDP	53.91%	13,373	2,688	10,938	1,586	-	-	28,585
Timiskaming—Cochrane	Lib	Lib	11,588	42.90%	634	2.35%	NDP	54.80%	11,588	3,659	10,954	811	-	-	27,012
Timmins—James Bay	NDP	NDP	13,176	51.60%	3,447	13.50%	Lib	53.76%	9,729	2,191	13,176	437	-	-	25,533
Toronto Centre	Lib	Lib	21,522	47.85%	12,438	27.65%	PC	49.90%	21,522	9,084	8,464	4,412	358	1,141	44,981
Toronto—Danforth	NDP	NDP	17,975	45.85%	6,527	16.65%	Lib	53.18%	11,448	4,423	17,975	4,372	-	986	39,204
Trinity—Spadina	NDP	NDP	18,508	41.15%	4,328	9.62%	Lib	49.63%	14,180	6,235	18,508	5,156	504	390	44,973
Vaughan	Lib	Lib	28,964	61.90%	20,205	43.18%	PC	46.31%	28,964	8,759	5,470	2,975	623	-	46,791
Welland	NDP	NDP	24,910	53.94%	14,330	31.03%	Lib	55.29%	10,580	8,722	24,910	1,973	-	-	46,185
Wellington—Halton Hills	PC	PC	21,533	49.16%	8,221	18.77%	Lib	57.49%	13,312	21,533	3,914	4,489	-	555	43,803
Whitby—Oshawa	PC	PC	22,694	44.00%	4,134	8.02%	Lib	53.54%	18,560	22,694	5,734	3,745	-	839	51,572
Willowdale	Lib	Lib	21,166	47.73%	5,608	12.65%	PC	49.51%	21,166	15,558	3,699	2,960	119	847	44,349
Windsor—Tecumseh	Lib	Lib	17,894	49.34%	9,058	24.98%	NDP	44.04%	17,894	6,106	8,836	2,696	-	735	36,267
Windsor West	Lib	Lib	16,821	50.19%	8,217	24.52%	NDP	41.02%	16,821	5,652	8,604	1,974	-	463	33,514
York Centre	Lib	Lib	16,646	48.73%	5,618	16.45%	PC	49.07%	16,646	11,028	3,713	2,207	-	568	34,162
York—Simcoe	PC	PC	19,173	46.23%	6,388	15.40%	Lib	49.73%	12,785	19,173	4,205	4,664	-	645	41,472
York South—Weston	Lib	Lib	13,846	42.94%	452	1.40%	NDP	46.34%	13,846	3,173	13,394	1,226	-	603	32,242
York West	Lib	Lib	13,246	54.74%	6,482	26.79%	NDP	44.44%	13,246	2,484	6,764	1,199	225	282	24,200

= new riding
= merged riding
= open seat
= turnout is above provincial average
= incumbent re-elected
= incumbent changed allegiance
= other incumbents renominated

=== Comparative analysis for ridings (2007 vs 2003) ===
Summary of riding results by turnout and vote share for winning candidate (vs 2003) (Note: Summarized from "Data Explorer". Elections Ontario.)
Riding and winning party			Turnout		Vote share	
Riding and winning party			%	Change (pp)	%	Change (pp)
Ajax—Pickering	Lib	Hold	49.34	-10.29	49.07	3.31
Algoma—Manitoulin	Lib	Hold	54.49	-3.34	42.56	-6.12
Ancaster—Dundas—Flamborough—Westdale	Lib	Hold	58.12	2.84	41.16	1.20
Barrie	Lib	Gain	51.95	-4.07	42.20	6.07
Beaches—East York	NDP	Hold	54.37	-1.26	44.32	-6.91
Bramalea—Gore—Malton	Lib	Hold	43.65	-6.16	47.00	1.40
Brampton—Springdale	Lib	Hold	43.45	-6.80	50.66	7.19
Brampton West	Lib	Hold	43.92	-6.91	46.19	0.02
Brant	Lib	Hold	52.69	-3.45	49.16	-5.39
Bruce—Grey—Owen Sound	PC	Hold	59.96	-2.94	46.61	-5.46
Burlington	PC	Hold	58.91	-2.60	41.34	-4.81
Cambridge	PC	Hold	49.69	--4.10	41.70	-0.80
Carleton—Mississippi Mills	PC	Hold	55.30	-6.12	47.83	-1.16
Chatham—Kent—Essex	Lib	Hold	48.81	-6.83	51.98	-7.27
Davenport	Lib	Hold	45.84	-3.22	41.82	-16.99
Don Valley East	Lib	Hold	51.30	-4.02	55.63	-1.17
Don Valley West	Lib	Hold	59.20	-0.65	50.44	-2.15
Dufferin—Caledon	PC	Hold	52.50	-6.00	41.85	-14.79
Durham	PC	Hold	54.34	-4.06	46.96	-0.14
Eglinton—Lawrence	Lib	Hold	55.62	-2.27	43.23	-13.66
Elgin—Middlesex—London	Lib	Hold	53.09	-7.23	49.10	-8.21
Essex	Lib	Hold	48.69	-4.68	48.02	2.74
Etobicoke Centre	Lib	Hold	59.40	-3.09	50.07	0.66
Etobicoke—Lakeshore	Lib	Hold	53.62	-5.90	45.99	1.83
Etobicoke North	Lib	Hold	45.19	-2.72	54.85	0.87
Glengarry—Prescott—Russell	Lib	Hold	52.80	-4.81	60.51	-5.46
Guelph	Lib	Hold	57.03	-3.05	40.92	-1.30
Haldimand—Norfolk	PC	Hold	56.25	-3.13	60.92	14.81
Haliburton—Kawartha Lakes—Brock	PC	Hold	59.22	-3.95	49.99	2.58
Halton	PC	Hold	51.53	-8.20	41.84	-6.36
Hamilton Centre	NDP	New	48.63	New	44.72	New
Hamilton East—Stoney Creek	NDP	Gain	51.36	4.63	37.65	8.23
Hamilton Mountain	Lib	Hold	53.33	-5.63	37.24	-14.55
Huron—Bruce	Lib	Hold	59.80	-6.66	45.95	0.15
Kenora—Rainy River	NDP	Hold	46.16	-2.41	60.62	0.50
Kingston and the Islands	Lib	Hold	53.96	-0.33	47.23	-13.05
Kitchener Centre	Lib	Hold	49.58	-3.66	45.90	3.30
Kitchener—Conestoga	Lib	New	49.25	New	41.82	New
Kitchener—Waterloo	PC	Hold	53.63	-5.44	40.84	-2.24
Lambton—Kent—Middlesex	Lib	Hold	55.18	-4.57	43.27	-1.85
Lanark—Frontenac—Lennox and Addington	PC	Gain	52.08	-6.60	40.58	7.57
Leeds—Grenville	PC	Hold	55.11	-7.00	56.24	7.53
London—Fanshawe	Lib	Hold	48.21	-4.24	38.68	2.81
London North Centre	Lib	Hold	50.00	-6.44	47.17	3.74
London West	Lib	Hold	57.83	-2.19	52.42	0.97
Markham—Unionville	Lib	New	40.51	New	59.47	New
Mississauga—Brampton South	Lib	New	42.46	New	53.78	New
Mississauga East—Cooksville	Lib	New	47.48	New	58.93	New
Mississauga—Erindale	Lib	New	47.08	New	47.85	New
Mississauga South	Lib	Hold	54.08	-2.81	46.68	2.88
Mississauga—Streetsville	Lib	New	45.63	New	52.55	New
Nepean—Carleton	PC	Hold	54.61	-7.61	50.28	-3.78
Newmarket—Aurora	PC	New	55.21	New	42.72	New
Niagara Falls	Lib	Hold	51.08	-6.32	47.53	0.67
Niagara West—Glanbrook	PC	Hold	58.57	-2.28	51.06	2.57
Nickel Belt	NDP	Hold	53.56	-8.26	46.59	0.06
Nipissing	Lib	Hold	56.79	-5.81	42.11	-7.73
Northumberland—Quinte West	Lib	Hold	54.92	-5.39	45.37	0.33
Oak Ridges—Markham	Lib	New	47.77	New	48.22	New
Oakville	Lib	Hold	58.26	-4.05	49.81	0.00
Oshawa	PC	Hold	48.94	-2.53	39.02	1.70
Ottawa Centre	Lib	Hold	58.25	2.62	34.91	-10.19
Ottawa—Orléans	Lib	Hold	57.86	-5.53	52.86	2.51
Ottawa South	Lib	Hold	56.60	-2.17	50.13	-1.57
Ottawa—Vanier	Lib	Hold	51.49	0.69	50.96	-2.57
Ottawa West—Nepean	Lib	Hold	57.51	-4.62	50.64	3.60
Oxford	PC	Hold	53.72	-6.50	47.27	3.21
Parkdale—High Park	NDP	Gain	57.43	2.50	44.71	28.94
Parry Sound—Muskoka	PC	Hold	56.76	-3.27	47.22	-1.29
Perth—Wellington	Lib	Hold	54.62	-5.07	46.65	3.94
Peterborough	Lib	Hold	57.47	-5.29	47.72	2.97
Pickering—Scarborough East	Lib	New	54.01	New	48.63	New
Prince Edward—Hastings	Lib	Hold	54.16	-3.04	46.36	-11.02
Renfrew—Nipissing—Pembroke	PC	Hold	57.55	-6.42	62.34	18.20
Richmond Hill	Lib	New	47.23	New	47.83	New
St. Catharines	Lib	Hold	53.83	-2.60	47.23	-10.21
St. Paul's	Lib	Hold	55.99	-2.04	47.43	-7.33
Sarnia—Lambton	PC	Gain	55.20	-4.14	38.16	7.16
Sault Ste. Marie	Lib	Hold	55.56	-5.54	60.13	3.09
Scarborough—Agincourt	Lib	Hold	46.01	-6.87	58.08	-3.02
Scarborough Centre	Lib	Hold	48.06	-8.54	53.66	1.60
Scarborough—Guildwood	Lib	New	51.28	New	42.52	New
Scarborough—Rouge River	Lib	Hold	41.82	-6.27	65.06	1.21
Scarborough Southwest	Lib	Hold	49.70	-5.18	46.15	-0.78
Simcoe—Grey	PC	Hold	54.86	-5.43	50.65	-0.82
Simcoe North	PC	Hold	54.06	-6.79	49.82	3.69
Stormont—Dundas—South Glengarry	Lib	Hold	51.81	-3.97	48.86	-2.33
Sudbury	Lib	Hold	51.11	-4.84	58.77	-10.21
Thornhill	PC	Gain	52.17	-5.61	45.92	0.76
Thunder Bay—Atikokan	Lib	Hold	52.36	-3.24	37.69	-20.56
Thunder Bay—Superior North	Lib	Hold	53.91	-1.70	46.78	-25.67
Timiskaming—Cochrane	Lib	Hold	54.80	-6.35	42.90	-16.66
Timmins—James Bay	NDP	Hold	53.76	-3.54	51.60	1.90
Toronto Centre	Lib	Hold	49.90	-3.22	47.85	-4.93
Toronto—Danforth	NDP	Hold	53.18	-2.69	45.85	-1.29
Trinity—Spadina	NDP	Hold	49.63	-2.41	41.15	-6.36
Vaughan	Lib	New	46.31	New	61.90	New
Welland	NDP	Hold	55.29	-4.96	53.94	4.30
Wellington—Halton Hills	PC	Hold	57.49	2.21	49.16	0.18
Whitby—Oshawa	PC	Hold	53.54	-6.86	44.00	-4.33
Willowdale	Lib	Hold	49.51	-6.23	47.73	0.76
Windsor—Tecumseh	Lib	Hold	44.04	-3.77	49.34	-5.58
Windsor West	Lib	Hold	41.02	-2.85	50.19	-12.32
York Centre	Lib	Hold	49.07	-0.52	48.73	-10.68
York—Simcoe	PC	Hold	49.73	-8.60	46.23	-0.96
York South—Weston	Lib	Hold	46.34	-4.41	42.94	-18.62
York West	Lib	Hold	44.44	0.49	54.74	-14.58

==== Maps ====
Support for Liberal Party candidates by riding

Support for Progressive Conservative Party candidates by riding

Support for New Democratic Party candidates by riding

Support for Green Party candidates by riding

=== Principal races ===
Party candidates in 2nd place
Party in 1st place	Party in 2nd place				Total
Party in 1st place	Lib	PC	NDP	Grn	Total
Liberal	–	58	13		71
Progressive Conservative	24	–	1	1	26
New Democratic	10		–		10
Total	34	58	14	1	107

Principal races, according to 1st and 2nd-place results
Parties		Seats
█ Liberal	█ Progressive Conservative	82
█ Liberal	█ New Democratic	23
█ Progressive Conservative	█ New Democratic	1
█ Progressive Conservative	█ Green	1
Total		107

Candidates ranked 1st to 5th place, by party
Parties	1st	2nd	3rd	4th	5th	Total
█ Liberal	71	34	2			107
█ Progressive Conservative	26	58	22	1		107
█ New Democratic	10	14	65	18		107
█ Green		1	18	88		107
█ Family Coalition					63	63
█ Libertarian					16	16
█ Independent					8	8
█ Freedom					2	2
█ Communist					1	

Resulting composition of the 40th Legislative Assembly of Ontario
Source	Party			
Source	Lib	PC	NDP	Total
Incumbents returned	60	22	8	90
Open seats held	3	1	1	5
Ouster of incumbent changing allegiance	1			1
New seats gained	5	1		6
Incumbents defeated	2	2		4
Open seats gained			1	1
Total	71	26	10	107

=== Incumbent MPPs who did not run for re-election ===
Electoral district	Incumbent at dissolution	Subsequent nominee	New MPP
Hamilton Mountain	Marie Bountrogianni	Sophia Aggelonitis	Sophia Aggelonitis
Scarborough East	Mary Anne Chambers	riding dissolved	
Hamilton West	Judy Marsales	riding dissolved	
Nickel Belt	Shelley Martel	France Gélinas	France Gélinas
Stoney Creek	Jennifer Mossop	Riding dissolved	
Prince Edward—Hastings	Ernie Parsons	Leona Dombrowsky	Leona Dombrowsky
Ottawa Centre	Richard Patten	Yasir Naqvi	Yasir Naqvi

== Opinion polls ==
Since the 2003 general election, several polls were conducted to determine the ongoing preference of voters. They showed a decline in Liberal support following the 2004 Ontario budget. Overall, support for the governing Liberals declined slightly since the 2003 election, the NDP gained some ground since the 2003 election, and the PCs' poll numbers did not change significantly since 2003. Support for the Green Party increased significantly, a shift which paralleled the increase in support for the party's federal counterpart. During the pre-election period, the Ontario Greens did not appear as an option in some of the polls.

Polls indicate results for decided voters. More information can be found in the footnotes to each poll, including undecided results, if provided by the pollster. A dash indicates the absence of a prompt for that party.

View source data.

2007 Ontario general election
Polling firm	Date released	Date poll conducted	Liberal	Progressive Conservative	New Democrats	Green
Harris-Decima	October 9, 2007	October 6 – 7, 2007	42	31	17	10
SES Research	October 9, 2007	October 6 – 7, 2007	43	31	18	9
Environics	October 9, 2007	September 28 – October 2, 2007	46	31	20	3
Strategic Counsel	October 8, 2007	October 6 – 7, 2007	42	27	19	11
Ipsos-Reid	October 6, 2007	October 2 – 4, 2007	43	32	18	6
Angus Reid Strategies	October 5, 2007	October 4 – 5, 2007	40	34	19	7
Decima Research	October 2, 2007	September 27 – October 1, 2007	43	32	14	10
SES Research	October 2, 2007	September 28 – 30, 2007	44	34	15	7
Ipsos-Reid	September 29, 2007	September 25 – 27, 2007	43	33	17	6
Environics	September 28, 2007	September 21 – 25, 2007	39	34	20	7
Decima Research	September 26, 2007	September 24 – 25, 2007	41	32	16	10
Angus Reid Strategies	September 25, 2007	September 24 – 25, 2007	40	35	16	8
SES Research	September 25, 2007	September 21 – 23, 2007	41	33	18	8
Ipsos-Reid	September 20, 2007	September 11 – 18, 2007	40	37	16	6
Decima Research	September 19, 2007	September 13 – 17, 2007	41	32	14	12
Strategic Counsel	September 18, 2007	September 13 – 16, 2007	40	34	16	10
Ipsos-Reid	September 15, 2007	September 4 – 13, 2007	40	37	16	6
Environics	September 13, 2007	September 6 – 9, 2007	39	35	17	-
Angus Reid Strategies	September 13, 2007	September 7 – 8, 2007	39	37	13	10
Decima Research	September 12, 2007	September 5 – 8, 2007	41	33	13	11
Ipsos-Reid	September 10, 2007	August 30 – September 8, 2007	41	36	17	6
SES Research	August 30, 2007	August 24 – 26, 2007	40	34	19	8
Ipsos-Reid	August 28, 2007	August 14 – 23, 2007	42	35	16	6
Ipsos-Reid	August 21, 2007	August 7 – 16, 2007	40	37	17	6
The Strategic Counsel	August 20, 2007	August 9 – 14, 2007	40	35	18	8
Ipsos-Reid	July 3, 2007	June 19 – 28, 2007	39	36	17	7
Environics	July 2, 2007	June 5 – 30, 2007	40	39	20	-
Pollara	June 16, 2007	June 7–10, 2007	37	37	19	-
SES Research	June 3, 2007	May 11–15, 2007	35	35	19	11
Environics	May 18, 2007	March 13–April 3, 2007	33	38	26	
Ipsos-Reid	February 24, 2007	-	38	33	17	9
Environics	January 5, 2007	December 8–30, 2006	39	37	21	-
SES Research	December 17, 2006	November 25–27, 2006	42	35	16	7
Environics	October 26, 2006	September 18 – October 12, 2006	42	33	23	-
EKOS	October 18, 2006	October 10–12, 2006	42.4	36.2	19.6	
SES Research	October 7, 2006	September 30 – October 3, 2006	35	29	18	7
Environics	September 9, 2006	June 2–24, 2006	35	36	27	-
Vector Research	May 14, 2006	-	39	38	18	5
Environics	April 13, 2006	-	34	39	24	-
SES Research	March 23, 2006	-	41	34	20	5
Léger Marketing	March 22, 2006	-	34	34	20	-
SES Research	February 17, 2006	-	41	37	18	4
Vector Research	January 21, 2006	-	36	35	23	6
Environics	October 16, 2005	-	42	35	21	-
Vector Research	September 19, 2005	-	33	41	20	6
SES Research	June 14, 2005	-	41	35	21	4
Léger Marketing	June 8, 2005	-	42	34	17	-
Léger Marketing	April 29, 2005	-	36	37	19	-
Vector Research	April 13, 2005	-	35	41	18	5
Environics	April 11, 2005	-	35	41	21	-
Léger Marketing	March 17, 2005	-	44	33	19	-
Vector Research	December 16, 2004	-	39	32	24	5
Environics	December 2004	-	37	39	23	-
Environics	December 11, 2004	-	35	40	23	-
Léger Marketing	September 2004	-	37	35	19	-
Vector Research	August 22, 2004	-	37	32	23	9
Environics	August 9, 2004	-	35	37	23	4
Ipsos-Reid	June 14, 2004	-	32	39	23	6
SES Research	June 5, 2004	-	34	41	20	-
Decima Research	May 27, 2004	-	32	29	21	-
Environics	May 6, 2004	-	45	33	20	1
Ipsos-Reid	April 19, 2004	-	45	30	19	5
SES Research	January 23, 2004	-	49	29	10	-
Environics	January 21, 2004	-	50	30	16	3
Ipsos-Reid	December 14, 2003	-	51	27	16	6
Ipsos-Reid	November 8, 2003	-	56	27	12	5
Environics	October 30, 2003	-	49	29	18	2
Last election (October 2, 2003)		-	46.4	34.6	14.7	2.8

=== Riding specific polls ===
Riding	Polling firm	Date released	Date poll conducted	Liberal	Progressive Conservative	New Democrats	Green
Don Valley West	COMPAS	October 1, 2007	September 25 – 29, 2007	52	37	5	6
Bruce—Grey—Owen Sound	Oraclepoll Research	October 4, 2007	October 2 – 3, 2007	21	37	13	27
Nickel Belt	Oraclepoll Research	October 4, 2007	October 2 – 3, 2007	41	7	49	3

== Timeline ==
- May 13, 2004 - Andrea Horwath of the NDP is elected in a by-election in Hamilton East and collects over 60% of the vote. The riding was previously held by the Liberals.
- May 18, 2004 - The 2004 Ontario budget is announced. Given its tax increase and healthcare cuts, it is unpopular with the public.
- June 1, 2004 - Bill 87, which would establish fixed election dates, is introduced in the Legislative Assembly.
- August 9, 2004 - A poll by Environics shows the Liberals in second place for the first time since the last election. The NDP is also rising in support. According to the poll, the Progressive Conservatives lead with 37% followed by the Liberals with 35%, the NDP with 23% and the Greens with 4%.
- September 18, 2004 - John Tory becomes leader of the Ontario Progressive Conservative Party replacing outgoing former premier Ernie Eves and defeating Jim Flaherty and Frank Klees.
- January 31, 2005 - Eves resigns his seat in the provincial legislature, clearing the way for Tory to run in the resulting by-election.
- March 17, 2005 - Tory is elected in the Dufferin—Peel—Wellington—Grey by-election, holding the seat for the Conservatives.
- March 29, 2005 - Tory is officially installed as the Leader of the Opposition.
- August 18, 2005 - Speaker Alvin Curling resigns his Scarborough—Rouge River seat to accept a diplomatic appointment. A by-election must be called within six months.
- October 26, 2005 - A by-election is called for Scarborough—Rouge River for November 24.
- November 24, 2005 - Bas Balkissoon wins in the Scarborough–Rouge River by-election, holding the seat for the Liberals.
- November 29, 2005 - Progressive Conservative MPPs Jim Flaherty, John Baird, and NDP MPP Marilyn Churley resign their seats in the provincial legislature to run for seats in the House of Commons of Canada in the 2006 federal election.
- March 1, 2006 - By-elections are called for the ridings of Toronto—Danforth, Nepean—Carleton, and Whitby—Ajax for March 30. These seats became vacant when they were resigned on November 29, 2005, so the MPPs could run in the federal election of January 2006.
- March 30, 2006 - the NDP's Peter Tabuns wins the Toronto—Danforth by-election, Progressive Conservative Lisa MacLeod wins in Nepean—Carleton, and Progressive Conservative Christine Elliott wins in Whitby-Ajax. The Liberals' star candidates in all three ridings fell short.
- May 18, 2006 - Former Education Minister Gerard Kennedy resigns his Parkdale—High Park seat to pursue his bid for the federal Liberal leadership.
- September 14, 2006 - Cheri DiNovo of the NDP wins the by-election to replace Liberal Gerard Kennedy in Parkdale-High Park.

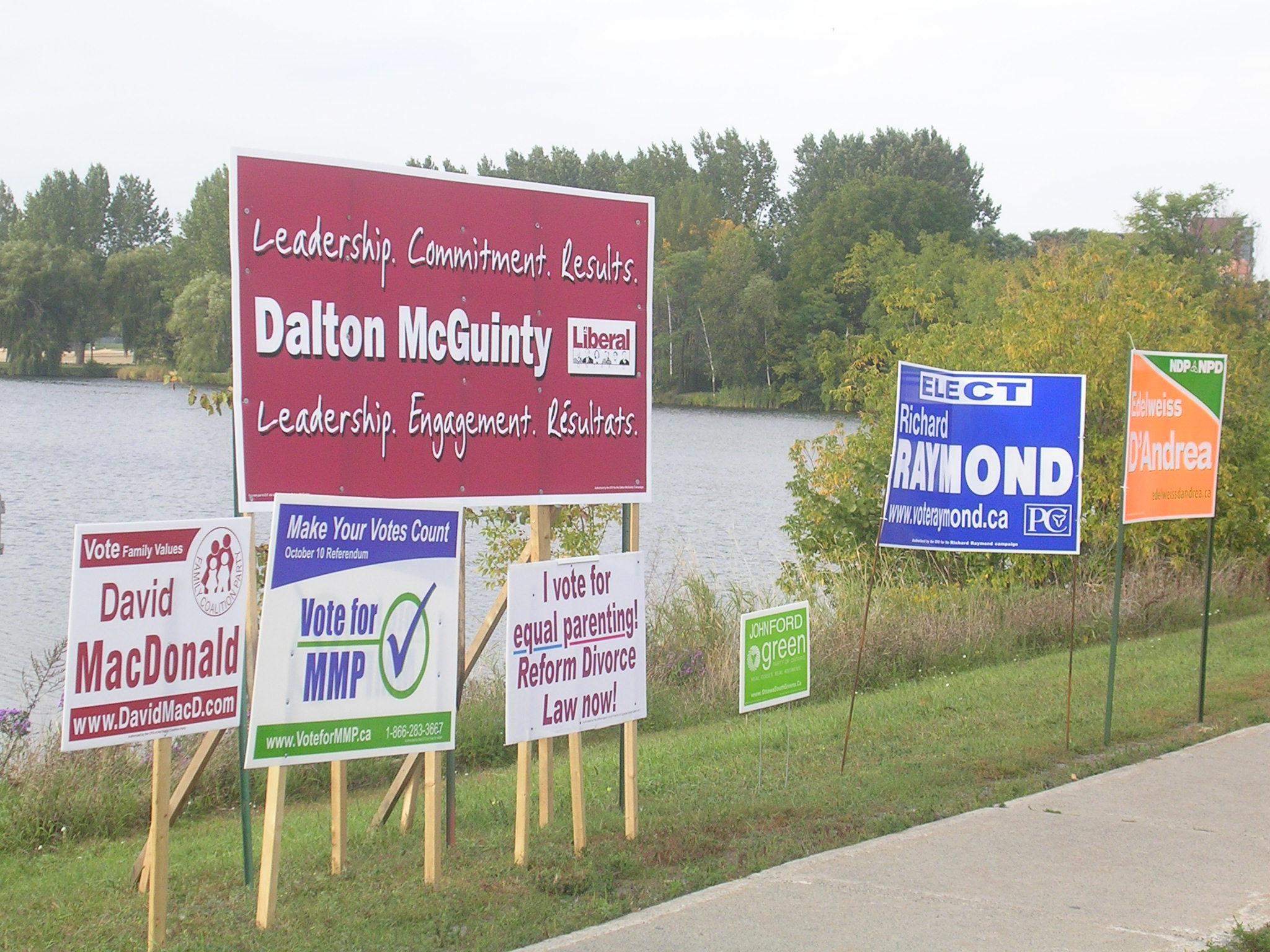
Election signs for the major parties plus a sign supporting the MMP side in the referendum in the constituency of Ottawa South. Ontario premier Dalton McGuinty is the Liberal candidate there.

- September 18, 2006 - Joe Cordiano, MPP for York South—Weston, resigns from cabinet and legislature to spend more time with family.
- September 25, 2006 - Tony Wong, MPP for Markham, resigns from the legislature to run for York Region council in Markham, Ontario.
- September 28, 2006 - Cam Jackson, MPP for Burlington, resigns from the Legislature to run for mayor of Burlington.
- January 10, 2007 - By-elections called in the ridings of: Burlington; Markham; and York South—Weston to be held on February 8, 2007.
- February 7, 2007 - The provincial government announces election date will be October 10, 2007 to avoid conflict with Shemini Atzeret on October 4.
- February 8, 2007 - In three by-elections, Paul Ferreira of the NDP wins York South–Weston from the Liberals while Michael Chan of the Liberals and Joyce Savoline of the PCs hold Markham and Burlington, respectively.
- March 29, 2007 - MPP Tim Peterson leaves the Liberal caucus and intends to run in this election as a Progressive Conservative.
- April 25, 2007 - Democratic Renewal Minister Marie Bountrogianni introduces Bill 218, a bill to have longer voting hours – 9 a.m. to 9 p.m. – that identification be presented, advanced polls increased to 13 days from 6 days, and amendments regarding the referendum on election formulas for electing MPPS. The proposed legislation will also deal with suggestions for online voting and with complaints that the permanent voters' list is unreliable because it does not keep up with moves and deaths.
- May 18, 2007 - New Democratic Party MPP Shelley Martel announced she will not seek re-election in her Nickel Belt riding. She is leaving politics for family reasons, and to pursue other career opportunities.
- May 18, 2007 - A poll released by Environics showed the governing Liberals in second place for the first time since March 2006. According to the poll, the Progressive Conservatives lead with 39% followed by the Liberals with 33%, the NDP with 26% and the Greens with 2%. The poll was conducted between March 13 to April 3, 2007.
- June 3, 2007 - A poll released by SES Research showed that the Liberals and Progressive Conservatives are in a dead-heat, with 29.8% of voters supporting each party. The NDP had 16% and the Green Party had 9%. 15% were undecided.
- June 4, 2007 Today, Bill 218 is given third reading and royal assent. The bill amends the Elections Act with the following changes: making electors present proper identification; methods of updating the permanent register of electors and creating an electronic system to allow electors to change their personal information online; alternative forms of voting and electronic vote counting can now take place; scrutineers from outside an electoral district, now have the same privileges as a resident scrutineer; Ballots will now show party affiliation and any nickname or familiar name of that the candidate requests; the Chief Electoral Officer is allowed to advertise information regarding the October 2007 Referendum on electoral reform.
- June 5, 2007 - Liberal Premier Dalton McGuinty prorogues the Legislature, stating that the passing of 14 bills during the session meant that the government's agenda had been fulfilled. The adjournment was three weeks earlier than expected and several private members' bills failed to receive third reading, including a bill to make it mandatory to fill out organ transplant cards. The legislature will not sit again until sometime after the October 10th election.
- July 11, 2007 - Citing health concerns Mary Anne Chambers, the Children and Youth Services Minister and MPP for Scarborough East, will not be seeking re-election in the October 10 Ontario vote. She would have run in the Scarborough—Guildwood electoral district.
- July 26, 2007 - Ontario Minister of Citizenship and Immigration Mike Colle resigned after an auditor general's report severely criticizes how $32 million in year-end grants to ethnic groups was administered.
- September 10, 2007 - Official election call. Writ issued as per omnibus Budget Act, Bill 187, that includes the amendment to the Election Act to set writ issuance date. Premier McGuinty formally asked the Lt. Governor to dissolve the legislature. The campaign will be 29 days long, one day longer than the minimum.

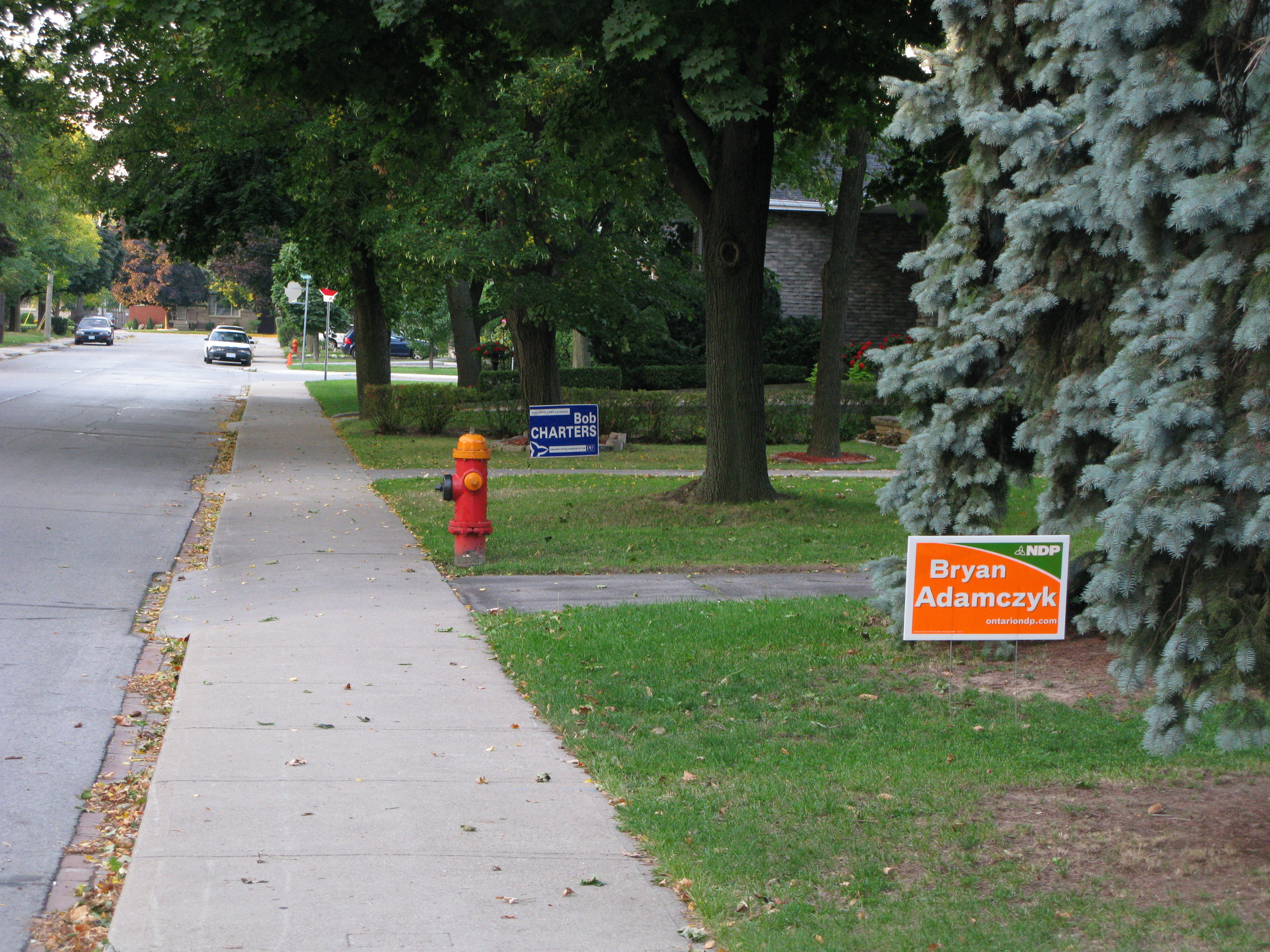
Lawn signs for local candidates in Hamilton Mountain

- September 18, 2007- Nomination papers due. A candidate or their designate must submit their nomination papers and deposit in person at the returning office by 2 p.m.
- September 20, 2007- Televised leadership debate between McGuinty, Tory and Hampton.
- September 22 – October 4, 2007 - Advance polling stations open for early voting from 9:00 a.m. until 9:00 p.m.
- October 10, 2007 - Ontario general election from 9:00 a.m. until 9:00 p.m. EDT or in the most western part of the province 8:00 a.m. to 8:00 p.m. CDT as per Provision 20, Section 40(1) and 40(2) of the Election Act.

== Election results ==
At 9:23 pm EDT, Citytv projected a Liberal majority government. CTV News made the same call at 9:30 pm EDT, followed by CBC News at 9:37 pm EDT, and Canadian Press at 9:52 pm EDT.

Also at 10:30 pm EDT, CBC and CTV reported that Progressive Conservative leader John Tory had called Liberal Leader Dalton McGuinty to concede the election. At 10:39 pm EDT, Tory was declared defeated by Canadian Press in the riding of Don Valley West.

At 10:43 pm EDT, Liberal leader Dalton McGuinty took the stage to give his speech to the public, breaking tradition of the defeated party leaders going first.

Each party lost at least one incumbent MPP — Liberals Mario Racco and Caroline Di Cocco, PCs Joe Tascona, Tim Peterson and John Tory and NDP Paul Ferreira were all defeated. However, each party's losses were offset by gains in other seats. The actual changes in party standings were accounted for entirely by the four new seats resulting from redistribution and the defeat of Peterson. Overall, however, most incumbent MPPs were returned in their ridings.

McGuinty became the first Liberal leader in Ontario to win two successive majorities in the legislature since Mitchell Hepburn in the 1937 election.

== Breakdown by region ==
=== Northern Ontario ===
	Liberal	Progressive Conservative	New Democrats	Green
Seats	7	1	3	0

All eleven ridings in Northern Ontario were retained by their incumbent parties. The popular vote, however, shifted dramatically, with several Liberal incumbents holding on only very narrowly against NDP challengers. Most notably, Bill Mauro retained Thunder Bay—Atikokan by a margin of just 36 votes against John Rafferty, whom Mauro had defeated in 2003 by a margin of over 11,000 — Rafferty, in fact, spent much of the night leading Mauro. A judicial recount on October 31 increased Mauro's margin of victory to 50 votes. David Ramsay, similarly, trailed New Democrat John Vanthof in Timiskaming—Cochrane for much of the night, pulling ahead to a winning margin of 634 votes only in the final few polls to report. This was the narrowest margin of victory in Ramsay's 22-year career. Michael Gravelle also retained Thunder Bay—Superior North by an uncharacteristically narrow margin over Jim Foulds.

As well, Monique Smith retained Nipissing by just 377 votes over Progressive Conservative candidate Bill Vrebosch — in 2003, she had defeated Progressive Conservative incumbent Al McDonald by a wider margin of over 3,000 votes.

In keeping with this trend, New Democrat incumbents Howard Hampton and Gilles Bisson widened their margins of victory over Liberal challengers compared to 2003, and France Gélinas maintained the same margin that her predecessor, Shelley Martel, had attained in the previous election.

Notably, the rise in popular support for the New Democrats in Northern Ontario carried over into the 2008 federal election, in which the NDP won nearly every seat in the region for the first time in its history.

=== Eastern Ontario ===
	Liberal	Progressive Conservative	New Democrats	Green
Seats	9	5	0	0

In Eastern Ontario, the new riding of Lanark—Frontenac—Lennox and Addington was carried by PC candidate Randy Hillier, while all 13 existing ridings were carried by their incumbent parties. With the exception of Yasir Naqvi, who carried Ottawa Centre by a much smaller margin over the NDP than Richard Patten had attained in 2003, Liberals in Ottawa improved their winning margins, although outside of Ottawa the popular vote trend remained relatively stable.

=== Central Ontario ===
	Liberal	Progressive Conservative	New Democrats	Green
Seats	3	8	0	0

The most conservative-friendly area of the province, the PC vote largely held up, with the only Liberal gain being Aileen Carroll winning Barrie, the seat she used to represent federally. This was countered by a PC nominal gain in Newmarket—Aurora. The area also delivered the strongest support in the province for the Green Party, with Shane Jolley finishing a very strong second in Bruce—Grey—Owen Sound with 33.1% of the vote, the best finish ever received by any Green candidate in Canada to that point. The Greens also knocked the NDP into fourth place in a majority of area ridings.

=== Midwestern Ontario ===
	Liberal	Progressive Conservative	New Democrats	Green
Seats	6	5	0	0

A politically mixed region, Midwestern Ontario had every incumbent party re-elected, as well as some anomalous results; in an election where the PCs were largely held to rural areas, and the Liberals consolidated an urban/suburban base, Elizabeth Witmer held onto the riding of Kitchener—Waterloo for the PCs, while the Liberals won in rural ridings in which they were the incumbent party, such as Huron—Bruce and Perth—Wellington. Further away from the provincewide result, on an election night which demonstrated Liberal strength province wide, Haldimand—Norfolk—Brant delivered the most crushing defeat for a Liberal candidate in the province, with the victorious PC incumbent Toby Barrett coming out 16,571 votes and 38.6% ahead of the Liberal.

=== Brampton, Mississauga & Oakville ===
	Liberal	Progressive Conservative	New Democrats	Green
Seats	9	0	0	0

Although the suburban Western GTA had traditionally been a good area for the PCs, winning many seats in the area as recently as the Harris days, where it formed part of the 905-area backbone of the PC government, the Liberals won every seat in the area handily, with the victorious Liberal candidates averaging at around 50%. Even Mississauga South, which prior to the 2003 election had not voted Liberal provincially since the riding's creation, and had been expected to be a very tight race, proved a surprisingly easy victory for Charles Sousa, who gained the seat back for the Liberals from Tim Peterson, who had crossed the floor. The NDP continued to be a non-factor in the area, while the Greens growth in popular vote across the province was reflected, with the Greens even beating the NDP into fourth place in Oakville, which ironically had been the only riding in the province the Greens had not run in the previous election.

=== Southern Durham and York ===
	Liberal	Progressive Conservative	New Democrats	Green
Seats	6	3	0	0

The Liberals continued to dominate York Region, with each incumbent being re-elected by a comfortable margin except in Thornhill where Mario Racco lost to PC candidate Peter Shurman. The newly created riding of Ajax—Pickering, projected to be a close race, elected Liberal Joe Dickson by over 6,000 votes despite having no party nominate incumbents. In southern Durham Region, Liberal Wayne Arthurs was re-elected to the newly distributed Pickering—Scarborough East, while Progressive Conservative Christine Elliott was re-elected to Whitby—Oshawa. Despite high expectations for Sid Ryan's fourth run as an NDP candidate in Oshawa, PC incumbent Jerry Ouellette was again re-elected by a wider majority than in 2003.

=== Hamilton, Burlington & Niagara ===
	Liberal	Progressive Conservative	New Democrats	Green
Seats	4	3	3	0

An area with several close seats, and a fairly even distribution of seats, every party had a realistic chance of increasing its seat count here. Hamilton East—Stoney Creek, which was a merger of a Liberal held riding and an NDP held riding, and had neither incumbent running, was the most interesting match of the night, with the NDP winning a close race. It proved to be the only change of the election, and every other riding returned the incumbent party, although many in close races, such as Hamilton Mountain (Liberals over NDP), Halton, (PCs over Liberals) and Burlington (PCs over Liberals).

=== Southwestern Ontario ===
	Liberal	Progressive Conservative	New Democrats	Green
Seats	9	1	0	0

In an area with a strong rural-urban divide, both the NDP and PCs had strong hopes of making gains against the Liberals. The NDP had strong hopes of upsetting high-profile Liberals in both Windsor West, and Windsor—Tecumseh, given the NDP's ownership of those seats federally, and the continued decline of the local industrial economy. London—Fanshawe was similarly also a top target, as the NDP had the riding federally and finished a close second in 2003. Overall, however, the only area seat that changed hands was Sarnia—Lambton, with Culture Minister Caroline Di Cocco, the most high-profile Liberal casualty of the night, losing to PC challenger Bob Bailey.

=== Toronto ===
	Liberal	Progressive Conservative	New Democrats	Green
Seats	18	0	4	0

All ridings in Toronto were retained by their incumbent parties, with the exception of York South—Weston. New Democrat Paul Ferreira, who had won the seat from the Liberals in a by-election in February 2007, was narrowly defeated by a swing back to Liberal candidate Laura Albanese. Almost twice as many people voted in the riding in the general election compared to the by-election.

In Toronto's other notable race, Liberal incumbent Kathleen Wynne defeated PC leader John Tory in Don Valley West. Tory previously represented Dufferin—Caledon, but had chosen to run in a Toronto riding in the general election.

Toronto's only incumbent from 2003 not to run again was Liberal MPP Mary Anne Chambers. The Liberals successfully retained the seat under new candidate Margarett Best.

== See also ==
- Politics of Ontario
- List of political parties in Ontario
- Premier of Ontario
- Leader of the Opposition (Ontario)
