= Caroline Di Cocco =

Canadian politician

The Honourable Caroline Di Cocco ECO

Member of the Ontario Provincial Parliament for Sarnia—Lambton
- In office June 3, 1999 – October 10, 2007
- Preceded by: Dave Boushy
- Succeeded by: Bob Bailey

Personal details
- Born: Fontechiari, Italy
- Occupation: Music teacher

Caroline Di Cocco is a former politician in Ontario, Canada. She was a member of the Legislative Assembly of Ontario representing the riding of Sarnia—Lambton for the Ontario Liberal Party from 1999 to 2007 and was a cabinet minister in the government of Dalton McGuinty until her defeat in the 2007 provincial election.

== Background ==
Di Cocco was born in Fontechiari, in Frosinone, Italy, and moved to Canada at a young age. She was educated at the Royal Conservatory of Music, and worked as a music teacher before entering political life.

She is also the author of a work entitled One By One ... Passo Dopo Passo, chronicling the history of the Italian community in Sarnia from 1870 to 1990.

In 1989, she founded the International Wine Gala.

== Politics ==
Di Cocco served as a city councillor for Sarnia City Council from 1997 to 1999. She was elected to the Ontario legislature in the Ontario general election of 1999, defeating incumbent Progressive Conservative Dave Boushy by almost 3000 votes in Sarnia—Lambton. The Progressive Conservatives won the election, and Di Cocco served as her party's critic for Culture, Recreation and Heritage for the next four years. She also became known for her promotion of local environmental issues. In 2002, she was awarded a knighthood (Cavalieri) by the Republic of Italy.

She was easily re-elected in the provincial election of 2003, defeating Tory candidate and private-school promoter Henk Vanden Ende by over 6000 votes. She was appointed Parliamentary Assistant to Michael Bryant in his capacity as Minister responsible for Democratic Renewal on October 23, 2003. On September 27, 2004, she was named Parliamentary Assistant to Marie Bountrogianni in her capacity as Minister of Children and Youth Services.

Di Cocco was appointed to cabinet on April 5, 2006, replacing Madeleine Meilleur as Minister of Culture.

In the 2007 provincial election, Di Cocco was defeated by Progressive Conservative candidate Bob Bailey.

=== Cabinet positions ===
McGuinty ministry, Province of Ontario (2003–2013)
Cabinet post (1)
Predecessor	Office	Successor
Madeleine Meilleur	Minister of Culture; 2006–2007	Aileen Carroll

== Electoral record ==
1999 Ontario general election
Party	Candidate	Votes	%
Liberal	Caroline Di Cocco	19,440	48.91
Progressive Conservative	Dave Boushy	16,679	41.96
New Democratic	Mark Kotanen	3,110	7.82
Freedom	Andrew K. Falby	517	1.3

Swing:

2003 Ontario general election
Party	Candidate	Votes	%	±%
Liberal	Caroline Di Cocco	18,179	47.54	-1.37
Progressive Conservative	Henk Vanden Ende	11,852	30.99	-10.97
New Democratic	Glenn Sonier	6,482	16.95	+9.13
Green	Bradley Gray	1,414	3.7	
Freedom	Andrew K. Falby	316	0.83	

Swing: 4.80 from PC to Lib (Lib hold)

2007 Ontario general election
Party	Candidate	Votes	%	±%
Progressive Conservative	Bob Bailey	16,303	38.3	+7.31
Liberal	Caroline Di Cocco	12,509	29.4	-18.14
New Democratic	Barb Millitt	11,412	26.8	+9.85
Green	Tim van Bodegom	2,384	5.6	+1.90

Swing: 12.73 from Lib to PC (PC gain)
