= Enniskillen, Ontario =

Enniskillen
- Township (lower-tier)
- Township of Enniskillen
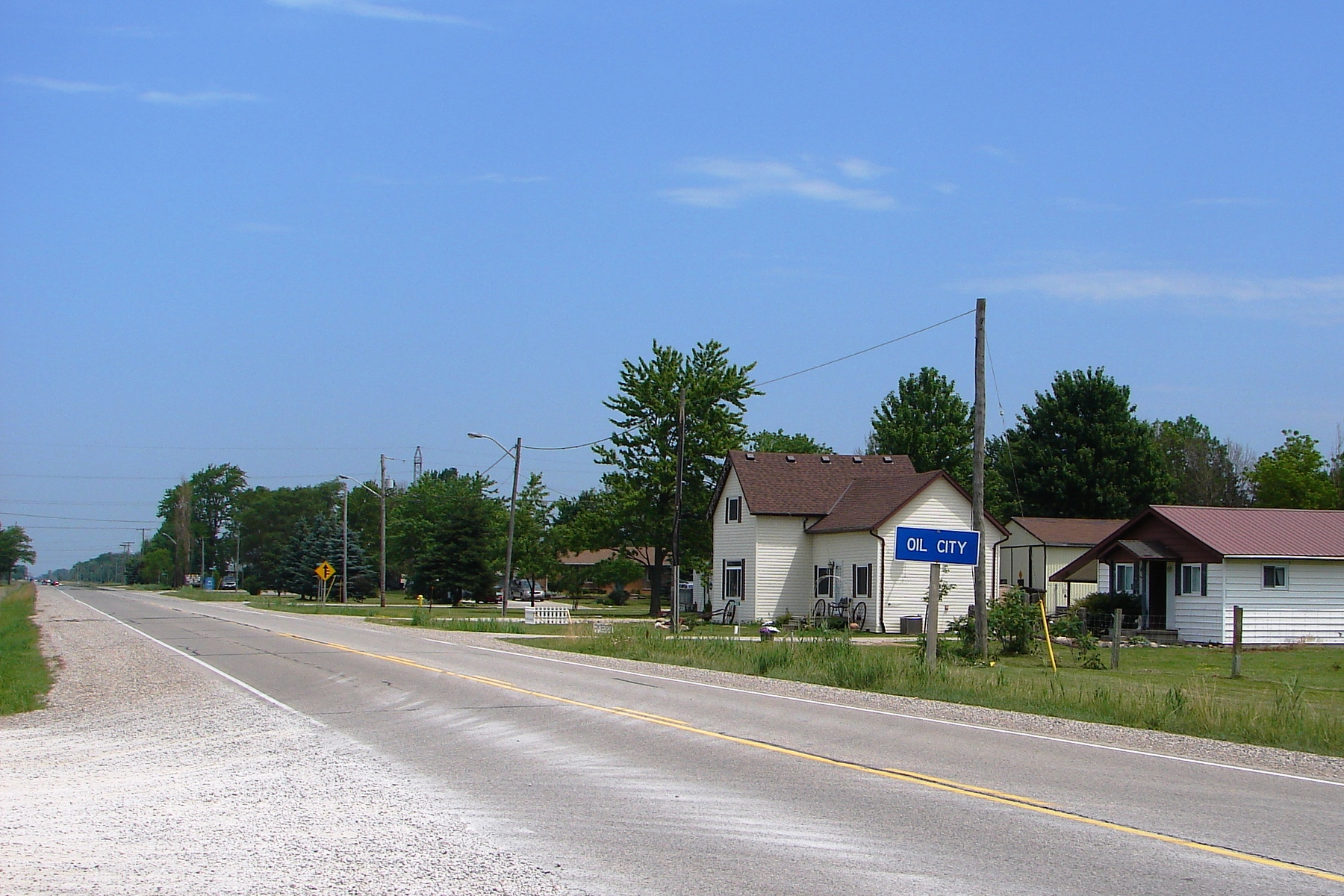
- Oil City hamlet

- Location within Lambton County Location within Southern Ontario
- Coordinates: 42°49′N 82°7.5′W
- Country: Canada
- Province: Ontario
- County: Lambton
- Settled: 1830s
- Incorporated: 1855

Government
  - Mayor: Kevin Marriott
  - Federal riding: Sarnia—Lambton—Bkejwanong
  - Prov. riding: Sarnia—Lambton

Area
  - Land: 338.05 km^{2} (130.52 sq mi)

Population (2021)
  - Total: 2,825
  - Density: 8.4/km^{2} (22/sq mi)
- Time zone: UTC-5 (EST)
  - Summer (DST): UTC-4 (EDT)
- Postal Code FSA: N0N
- Area codes: 519, 226, 548
- Website: www.enniskillen.ca

Enniskillen is a township in the Canadian province of Ontario, within Lambton County. It is located at the intersection of Highway 21 (Oil Heritage Road) and Rokeby Line. The economy of the township is based on agriculture. It was named after Sir Galbraith Lowry Cole's father who was the Earl of Enniskillen, Northern Ireland.

== Communities ==
The township comprises the communities of Oil City, Glen Rae and Marthaville, and surrounds but does not include the independent municipalities of Petrolia and Oil Springs.

== Demographics ==
In the 2021 Census of Population conducted by Statistics Canada, Enniskillen had a population of 2,825 living in 1,041 of its 1,087 total private dwellings, a change of 1% from its 2016 population of 2,796. With a land area of 338.05 km^{2} (130.52 sq mi), it had a population density of 8.4/km^{2} (21.6/sq mi) in 2021.

Canada census – Enniskillen community profile

	2021	2016	2011
Population	2,825 (+1.0% from 2016)	2,796 (-4.6% from 2011)	2,930 (-6.1% from 2006)
Land area	338.05 km^{2} (130.52 sq mi)	338.16 km^{2} (130.56 sq mi)	338.18 km^{2} (130.57 sq mi)
Population density	8.4/km^{2} (22/sq mi)	8.3/km^{2} (21/sq mi)	8.7/km^{2} (23/sq mi)
Median age	47.2 (M: 44.0, F: 48.4)	49.1 (M: 47.2, F: 50.5)
Private dwellings	1,087 (total) 1,041 (occupied)	1,093 (total)	1,124 (total)
Median household income	$104,000	$89,728

References: 2021 2016 2011

Historical census populations – Enniskillen, Ontario

Year	Pop.	±%
1921	3,063	—
1931	2,692	−12.1%
1941	2,623	−2.6%
1951	2,511	−4.3%
1956	2,735	+8.9%
1961	2,896	+5.9%

Year	Pop.	±%
1966	2,892	−0.1%
1971	3,022	+4.5%
1976	3,327	+10.1%
1981	3,307	−0.6%
1986	3,165	−4.3%
1991	3,167	+0.1%

Year	Pop.	±%
1996	3,288	+3.8%
2001	3,259	−0.9%
2006	3,122	−4.2%
2011	2,930	−6.1%
2016	2,796	−4.6%
2021	2,825	+1.0%

Source: Statistics Canada

== See also ==
- List of townships in Ontario
