= Sarnia—Lambton (provincial electoral district) =

Provincial electoral district in Ontario, Canada

Coordinates: 42.90°N 82.17°W

Ontario electoral district
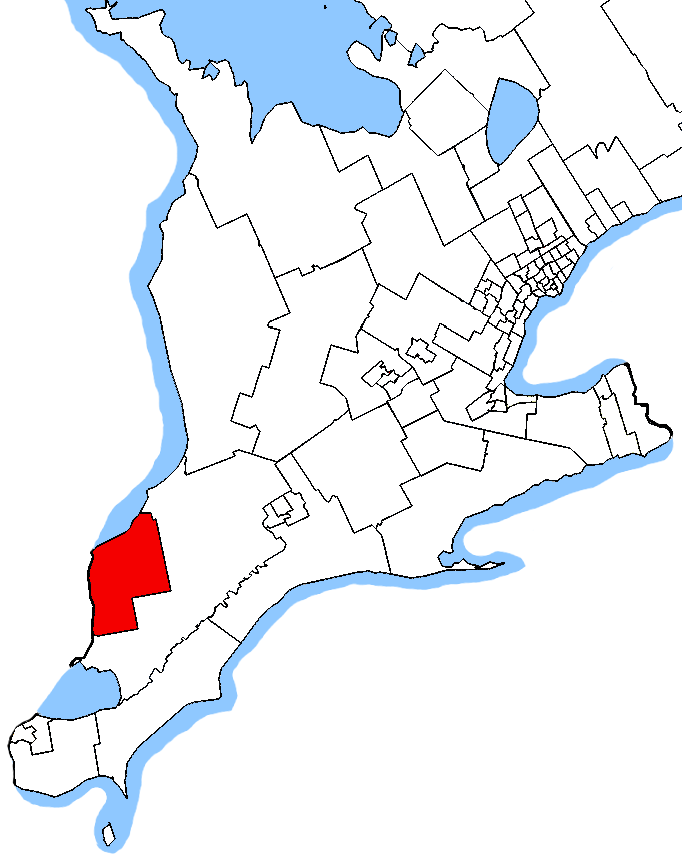
- Sarnia—Lambton in relation to other southwestern Ontario electoral districts

Provincial electoral district
- Legislature: Legislative Assembly of Ontario
MPP
Bob Bailey
Progressive Conservative
- District created: 1999
- First contested: 1999
- Last contested: 2025

Demographics
- Population (2016): 105,335
- Electors (2018): 84,296
- Area (km²): 1,755
- Pop. density (per km²): 60
- Census division: Lambton County
- Census subdivision(s): Sarnia, St. Clair, Plympton-Wyoming, Petrolia, Enniskillen, Point Edward

Sarnia—Lambton is a provincial electoral district in Southwestern Ontario, Canada. It elects one member to the Legislative Assembly of Ontario.

The riding was created in 1999 from Sarnia and from part of Lambton when ridings in Ontario were redrawn to match federal ridings.

From 1999 to 2007, the riding consisted of the municipalities of Sarnia, Point Edward, St. Clair and Sarnia 45. For the 2007 election, it gained the municipalities of Petrolia, Plympton-Wyoming, Oil Springs and Enniskillen.

== Members of Provincial Parliament ==
Sarnia—Lambton
Assembly	Years	Member	Party
Riding created from Sarnia and Lambton
37th	1999–2003	Caroline Di Cocco	Liberal
38th	2003–2007	Caroline Di Cocco	Liberal
39th	2007–2011	Bob Bailey	Progressive Conservative
40th	2011–2014	Bob Bailey	Progressive Conservative
41st	2014–2018	Bob Bailey	Progressive Conservative
42nd	2018–2022	Bob Bailey	Progressive Conservative
43rd	2022–present	Bob Bailey	Progressive Conservative

== Election results ==
Winning party in each polling division of Sarnia—Lambton at the 2025 Ontario general election

2025 Ontario general election
Party	Candidate	Votes	%	±%	Expenditures
Progressive Conservative	Bob Bailey	22,726	51.32	–1.40	$36,693
New Democratic	Candace Young	8,716	19.68	–3.93	$12,483
Liberal	Rachel Willsie	8,134	18.37	+7.92	$17,540
New Blue	Keith Benn	1,876	4.24	–2.53	$9,310
Independent	Nathan Colquhoun	890	2.01	–	$200
Green	Pamela Reid	840	1.90	–1.25	$0
Libertarian	Jacques Boudreau	591	1.33	–	$0
Ontario Party	Mark Lamore	359	0.81	–0.06	$0
Populist	Tom Stoukas	151	0.34	–2.08	$0
Total valid votes/expense limit		44,283	99.18	–	$142,303
Total rejected, unmarked and declined ballots		367	0.82	+0.04	
Turnout		44,650	50.52	+3.83	
Eligible voters		88,387			
Progressive Conservative hold		Swing		+1.27	
Source: Elections Ontario

Winning party in each polling division of Sarnia—Lambton at the 2022 Ontario general election

2022 Ontario general election
Party	Candidate	Votes	%	±%	Expenditures
Progressive Conservative	Bob Bailey	21,184	52.72	–0.02	$29,549
New Democratic	Dylan Stelpstra	9,489	23.62	–13.75	$34,373
Liberal	Mark Russell	4,200	10.45	+6.03	$0
New Blue	Keith Benn	2,719	6.77	–	$13,739
Green	Mason Bourdeau	1,266	3.15	–0.50	$0
Populist	Carla Olson	972	2.42	–	$0
Ontario Party	Ian Orchard	351	0.87	–	$0
Total valid votes/expense limit		40,181	99.22	–	$121,429
Total rejected, unmarked and declined ballots		315	0.78	–0.19	
Turnout		40,496	46.69	–14.20	
Eligible voters		86,735			
Progressive Conservative hold		Swing		+6.86	
Source: Elections Ontario

2018 Ontario general election
Party	Candidate	Votes	%	±%
Progressive Conservative	Bob Bailey	26,811	52.75	+11.73
New Democratic	Kathy Alexander	18,995	37.37	+1.60
Liberal	Neil Wereley	2,246	4.42	–13.44
Green	Kevin Shaw	1,856	3.65	–0.97
Trillium	Andy Bruziewicz	601	1.18	–
None of the Above	Jeff Lozier	250	0.49	–
No Affiliation	Fanina R. Kodre	71	0.14	–
Total valid votes		50,830	99.03	
Total rejected, unmarked and declined ballots		497	0.97	–0.36
Turnout		51,327	60.89	+3.54
Eligible voters		84,296		
Progressive Conservative hold		Swing		+5.07
Source: Elections Ontario

2014 Ontario general election
Party	Candidate	Votes	%	±%
Progressive Conservative	Bob Bailey	18,722	41.01	–7.31
New Democratic	Brian White	16,327	35.77	+10.32
Liberal	Anne Marie Gillis	8,152	17.86	–3.92
Green	Kevin Shaw	2,109	4.62	+3.22
Libertarian	Andrew K. Falby	340	0.74	+0.35
Total valid votes		45,650	98.67	
Total rejected, unmarked and declined ballots		614	1.33	+0.84
Turnout		46,264	57.35	+5.60
Eligible voters		80,669		
Progressive Conservative hold		Swing		–8.81
Source: Elections Ontario

2011 Ontario general election
Party	Candidate	Votes	%	±%
Progressive Conservative	Bob Bailey	19,570	48.32	+10.16
New Democratic	Brian K. White	10,307	25.45	–1.37
Liberal	Stephanie Barry	8,819	21.78	–7.63
Independent	Andy Bruziewicz	1,077	2.66	–
Green	Jason Vermette	567	1.40	–4.22
Libertarian	Andrew K. Falby	160	0.40	–
Total valid votes		40,500	99.51	
Total rejected, unmarked and declined ballots		199	0.49	–0.22
Turnout		40,699	51.75	–3.45
Eligible voters		78,646		
Progressive Conservative hold		Swing		+5.77
Source: Elections Ontario

2007 Ontario general election
Party	Candidate	Votes	%	±%
Progressive Conservative	Bob Bailey	16,145	38.16	+7.16
Liberal	Caroline Di Cocco	12,443	29.41	–18.13
New Democratic	Barb Millet	11,349	26.82	+9.87
Green	Tim van Bodegom	2,376	5.62	+1.92
Total valid votes		42,313	99.29	
Total rejected, unmarked and declined ballots		304	0.71	+0.08
Turnout		42,617	55.20	–4.14
Eligible voters		77,211		
Progressive Conservative gain from Liberal		Swing		+12.65
Source: Elections Ontario

2003 Ontario general election
Party	Candidate	Votes	%	±%
Liberal	Caroline Di Cocco	18,179	47.54	–1.38
Progressive Conservative	Henk Vanden Ende	11,852	30.99	–10.97
New Democratic	Glenn Sonier	6,482	16.95	+9.12
Green	Bradley Gray	1,414	3.70	–
Freedom	Andrew K. Falby	316	0.83	–0.47
Total valid votes		38,243	99.37	
Total rejected, unmarked and declined ballots		242	0.63	–0.00
Turnout		38,485	59.34	–0.83
Eligible voters		64,858		
Liberal hold		Swing		+4.80
Source: Elections Ontario

1999 Ontario general election
Party	Candidate	Votes	%
Liberal	Caroline Di Cocco	19,440	48.91
Progressive Conservative	David Boushy	16,679	41.96
New Democratic	Mark Kotanen	3,110	7.82
Freedom	Andrew K. Falby	517	1.30
Total valid votes		39,746	99.37
Total rejected, unmarked and declined ballots		253	0.63
Turnout		39,999	60.17
Eligible voters		66,477	
Liberal pickup new district.			
Source: Elections Ontario

== 2007 electoral reform referendum ==
2007 Ontario electoral reform referendum
Side	Votes	%
First Past the Post	27,801	67.2
Mixed member proportional	13,594	32.8
Total valid votes	41,395	100.0

== See also ==
- List of Ontario provincial electoral districts
- Canadian provincial electoral districts
