= Petrolia, Ontario =

Petrolia
- Town (lower-tier)
- Town of Petrolia
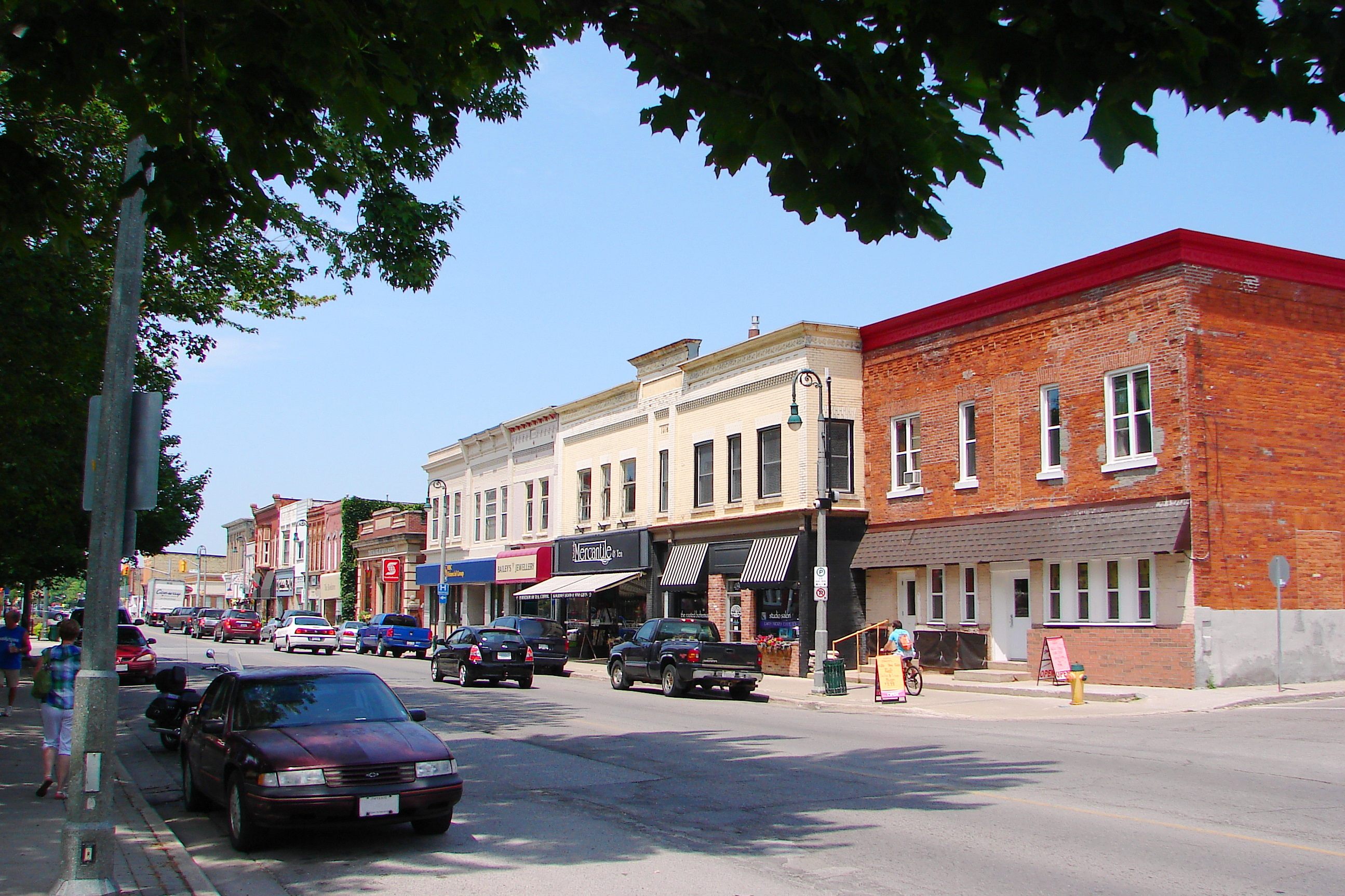
- Nickname: Canada's Victorian Oil Town
- Location within Lambton County Location within Southern Ontario
- Coordinates: 42°53′N 82°08.5′W
- Country: Canada
- Province: Ontario
- County: Lambton
- Settled: 1866
- Incorporated: 25 December 1866

Government
  - Mayor: Brad Loosley
  - Fed. riding: Sarnia—Lambton—Bkejwanong
  - Prov. riding: Sarnia—Lambton

Area
  - Land: 12.46 km^{2} (4.81 sq mi)

Population (2021)
  - Total: 6,013
  - Density: 482.6/km^{2} (1,250/sq mi)
- Time zone: UTC-5 (Eastern (EST))
  - Summer (DST): UTC-4 (EDT)
- Postal code: N0N 1R0
- Area codes: 519 and 226
- Website: town.petrolia.on.ca

Petrolia is a town in southwestern Ontario, Canada. It is part of Lambton County and is surrounded by Enniskillen Township. It is billed as "Canada's Victorian Oil Town" and is often credited with starting the oil industry in North America, a claim shared with the nearby town of Oil Springs.

Lambton Central Collegiate & Vocational Institute (LCCVI) is located in Petrolia.

== History ==
In 1857, James Miller Williams of Hamilton began distilling some of the "tar" lying around Oil Springs (located a few kilometers south from Petrolia), after buying the property rights from Charles Nelson Tripp. In July or August 1858, he struck an oil deposit in Oil Springs while digging a shallow well, sparking the oil drilling industry. In 2008, the 150th anniversary of the discovery, Canada Post issued a stamp commemorating this first commercial oil well, featuring portraits of Charles Tripp and Williams. However, these early wells resulted in a large amount of wastage from gushers, estimated at 5 million barrels (790,000 m^{3}) of oil in 1862 alone.

Petrolia got its start in 1866 when a major gas well was found, resulting in an oil boom that caused many to abandon Oil Springs in favour of this new settlement. The place separated from Enniskillen Township and was incorporated as a town on 25 December of that same year.

Oil production went through several boom periods in Petrolia; one was in 1898 and another in 1938. Some wells sunk in 1938 were initially producing 100 barrels per day (16 m^{3}/d) at a price of $2 per barrel. This output, however, often lasted only a few weeks, falling to less than a barrel a day.

Oil men from Petrolia traveled to the far reaches of the world (Gobi Desert, Arctic, Iran, Indonesia, United States, Australia, Russia, and over 80 other countries) teaching others how to find and extract crude oil. Those born and raised in Petrolia are referred to as "Hard Oilers", paying tribute to the toughness of their ancestors. Petrolia is also home to the Petrolia Discovery museum. Some oil fields in the area are still operational.

== Climate ==
Climate data for Petrolia (1981–2010)
Month	Jan	Feb	Mar	Apr	May	Jun	Jul	Aug	Sep	Oct	Nov	Dec	Year
Record high °C (°F)	15.0 (59.0)	21.0 (69.8)	26.5 (79.7)	31.5 (88.7)	33.5 (92.3)	39.5 (103.1)	38.0 (100.4)	38.0 (100.4)	35.0 (95.0)	29.4 (84.9)	23.3 (73.9)	18.5 (65.3)	39.5 (103.1)
Mean daily maximum °C (°F)	−1.3 (29.7)	0.6 (33.1)	5.8 (42.4)	13.0 (55.4)	19.8 (67.6)	25.2 (77.4)	27.7 (81.9)	26.4 (79.5)	22.6 (72.7)	15.3 (59.5)	8.0 (46.4)	1.6 (34.9)	13.7 (56.7)
Daily mean °C (°F)	−5 (23)	−3.5 (25.7)	1.1 (34.0)	7.6 (45.7)	13.8 (56.8)	19.1 (66.4)	21.7 (71.1)	20.7 (69.3)	16.9 (62.4)	10.4 (50.7)	4.3 (39.7)	−1.8 (28.8)	8.8 (47.8)
Mean daily minimum °C (°F)	−8.6 (16.5)	−7.5 (18.5)	−3.6 (25.5)	2.1 (35.8)	7.7 (45.9)	13.0 (55.4)	15.7 (60.3)	15.0 (59.0)	11.1 (52.0)	5.5 (41.9)	0.6 (33.1)	−5.1 (22.8)	3.8 (38.8)
Record low °C (°F)	−30.0 (−22.0)	−27.0 (−16.6)	−25.0 (−13.0)	−13.0 (8.6)	−2.5 (27.5)	−1.7 (28.9)	5.6 (42.1)	2.0 (35.6)	−2.0 (28.4)	−7.2 (19.0)	−17.2 (1.0)	−22.0 (−7.6)	−30.0 (−22.0)
Average precipitation mm (inches)	66.2 (2.61)	56.6 (2.23)	62.5 (2.46)	86.9 (3.42)	87.0 (3.43)	90.1 (3.55)	75.7 (2.98)	81.8 (3.22)	107.3 (4.22)	81.7 (3.22)	89.3 (3.52)	75.5 (2.97)	960.6 (37.82)
Average rainfall mm (inches)	26.9 (1.06)	31.4 (1.24)	44.6 (1.76)	83.6 (3.29)	87.0 (3.43)	90.1 (3.55)	75.7 (2.98)	81.8 (3.22)	107.3 (4.22)	81.6 (3.21)	83.5 (3.29)	49.3 (1.94)	842.7 (33.18)
Average snowfall cm (inches)	39.2 (15.4)	25.2 (9.9)	17.9 (7.0)	3.3 (1.3)	0.0 (0.0)	0.0 (0.0)	0.0 (0.0)	0.0 (0.0)	0.0 (0.0)	0.1 (0.0)	5.8 (2.3)	26.2 (10.3)	117.8 (46.4)
Average precipitation days (≥ 0.2 mm)	16.4	12.7	13.7	15.5	13.0	11.8	11.3	11.5	12.0	13.5	15.3	15.0	161.5
Average rainy days (≥ 0.2 mm)	6.3	6.3	9.5	14.8	13.0	11.8	11.3	11.5	12.0	13.5	13.9	9.3	133.2
Average snowy days (≥ 0.2 cm)	11.3	7.9	6.0	1.6	0.0	0.0	0.0	0.0	0.0	0.08	2.1	7.8	36.8
Source: Environment Canada

== Demographics ==
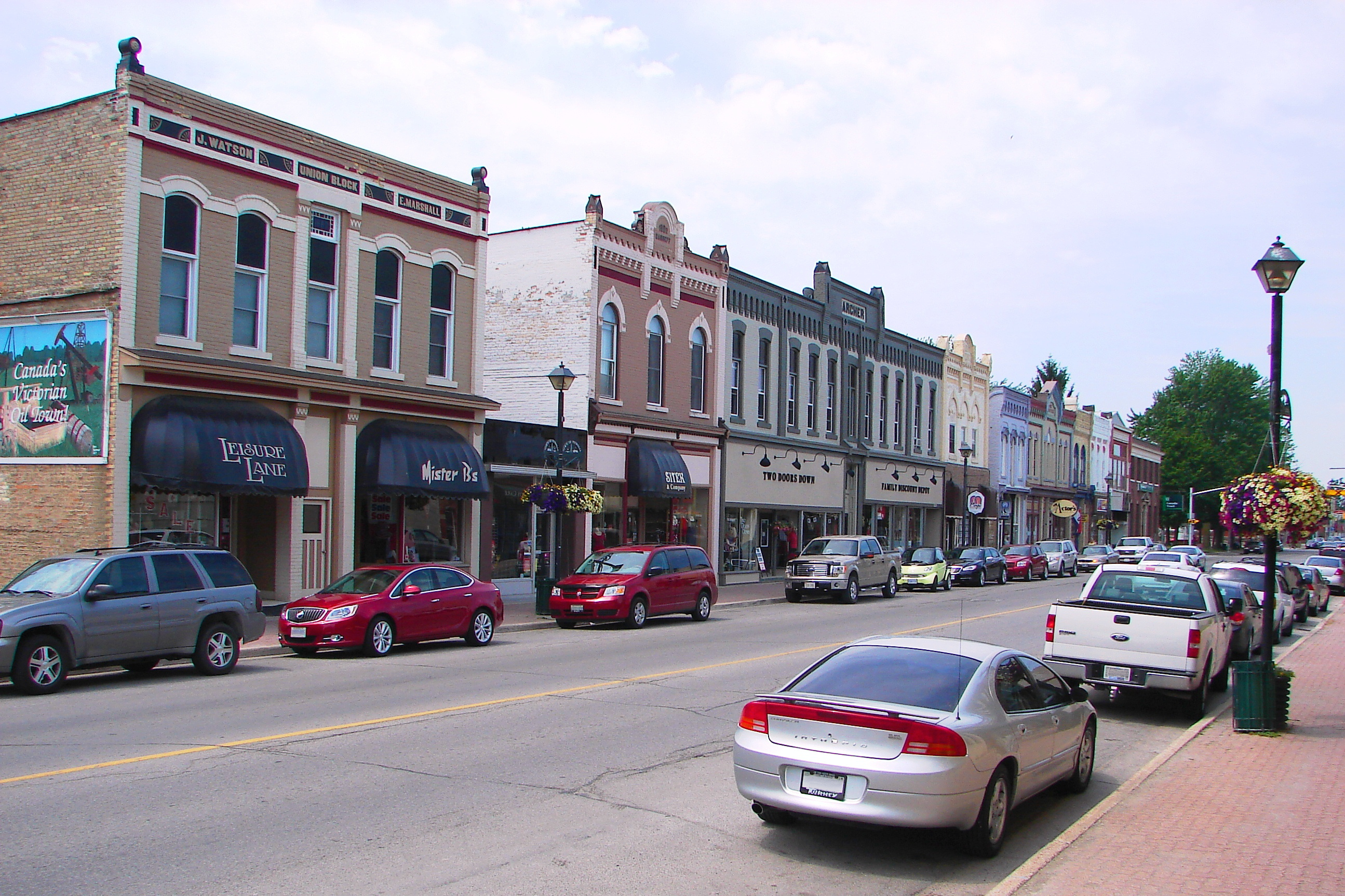
Petrolia main street

In the 2021 Census of Population conducted by Statistics Canada, Petrolia had a population of 6,013 living in 2,460 of its 2,524 total private dwellings, a change of 4.7% from its 2016 population of 5,742. With a land area of 12.46 km^{2} (4.81 sq mi), it had a population density of 482.6/km^{2} (1,249.9/sq mi) in 2021.

Canada census – Petrolia community profile

	2021	2016	2011
Population	6,013 (+4.7% from 2016)	5,742 (3.9% from 2011)	5,528 (5.9% from 2006)
Land area	12.46 km^{2} (4.81 sq mi)	12.68 km^{2} (4.90 sq mi)	12.68 km^{2} (4.90 sq mi)
Population density	482.6/km^{2} (1,250/sq mi)	452.8/km^{2} (1,173/sq mi)	435.8/km^{2} (1,129/sq mi)
Median age	42.8 (M: 40.4, F: 45.6)	43.0 (M: 41.5, F: 44.7)
Private dwellings	2,524 (total) 2,460 (occupied)	2,323 (total)	2,223 (total)
Median household income	$86,000	$72,741

References: 2021 2016 2011

Historical census populations – Petrolia, Ontario

Year	Pop.	±%
1871	2,651	—
1881	3,465	+30.7%
1891	4,357	+25.7%
1901	4,135	−5.1%
1911	3,518	−14.9%
1921	3,148	−10.5%
1931	2,596	−17.5%
1941	2,801	+7.9%

Year	Pop.	±%
1951	3,105	+10.9%
1956	3,426	+10.3%
1961	3,708	+8.2%
1966	3,929	+6.0%
1971	4,044	+2.9%
1976	4,394	+8.7%
1981	4,234	−3.6%
1986	4,347	+2.7%

Year	Pop.	±%
1991	4,594	+5.7%
1996	4,908	+6.8%
2001	4,849	−1.2%
2006	5,222	+7.7%
2011	5,528	+5.9%
2016	5,742	+3.9%
2021	6,013	+4.7%

Source: Statistics Canada

== Attractions ==
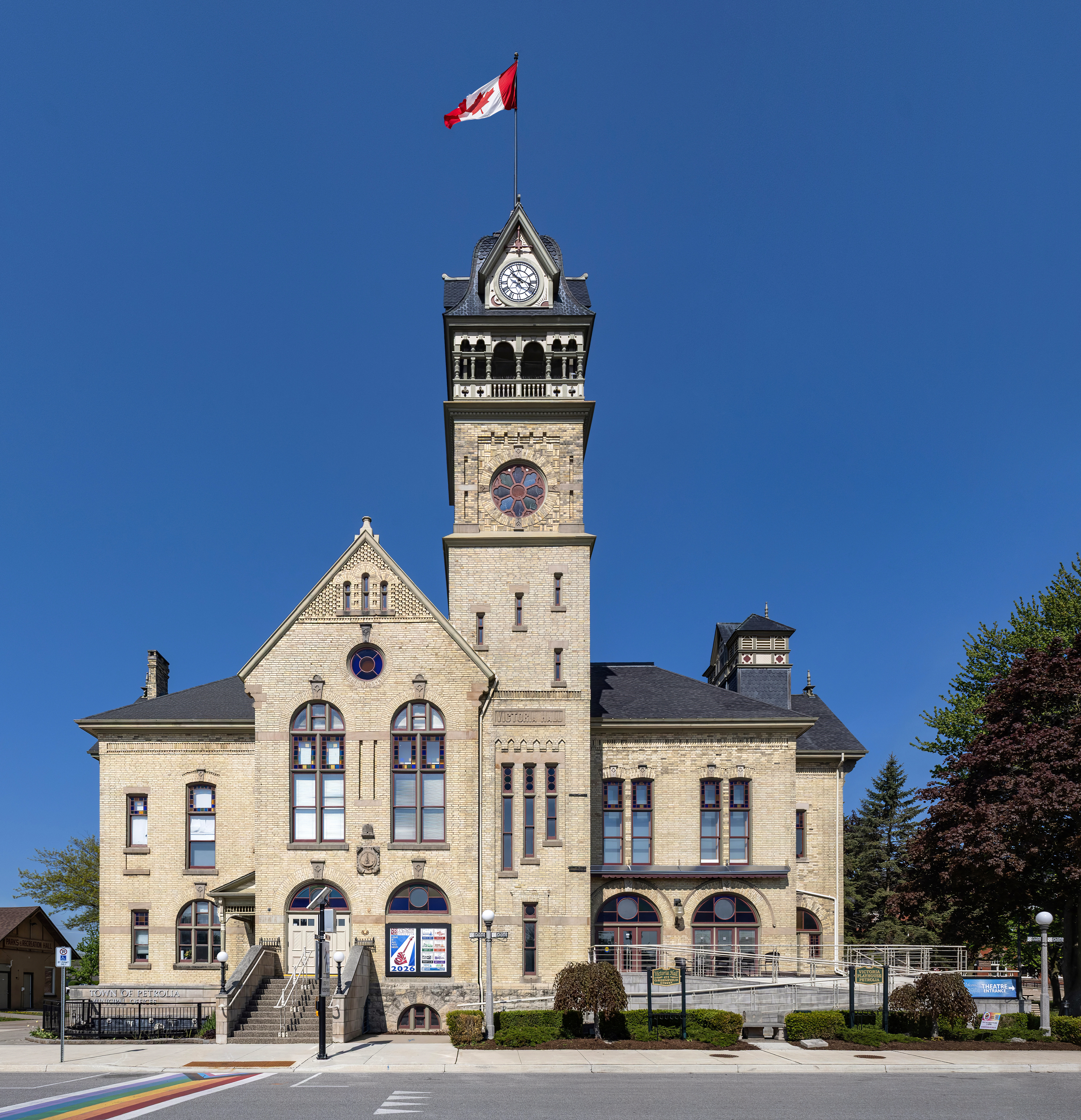
Victoria Hall, housing Petrolia's municipal offices and a theatre, was built in 1889

Petrolia is home to Victoria Hall, a National Historic Site of Canada. Originally a fire hall, municipal office, police hall, jail and opera house, it was completed in 1889 for a total cost of $35,000. In January 1989, a fire caused extensive damage. It was subsequently restored, and re-opened in 1992. Currently it houses the town hall and Victoria Playhouse.

Directly adjacent to Victoria Hall is Petrolia's Victoria Park, which hosts the annual 'PizzaFest' food festival as a collaboration between the town and their five local pizza restaurants.

The Oil Heritage District Community Centre was opened in Petrolia in 2006. It serves rural and town residents in central Lambton County.

== Sports ==
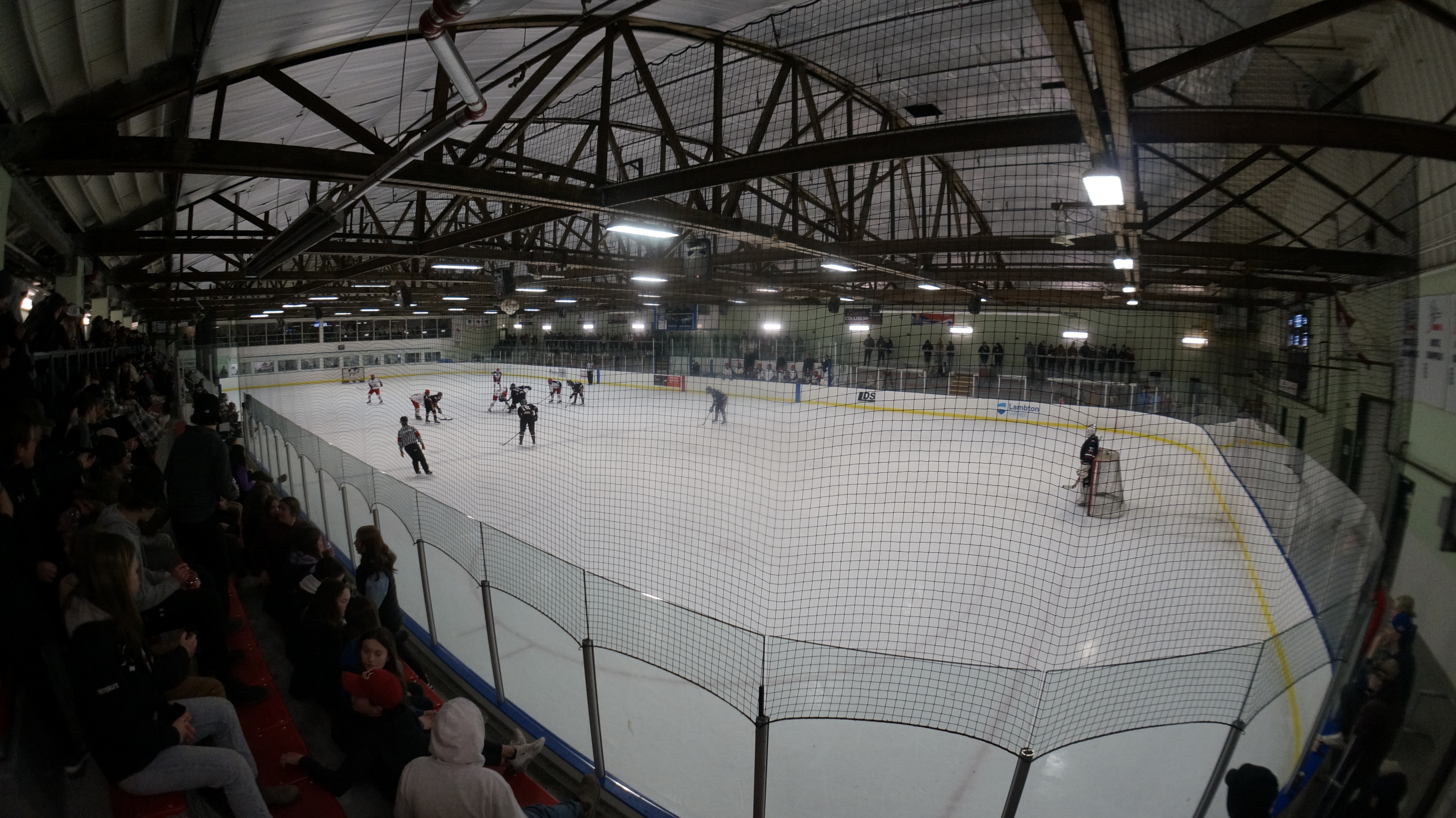
Greenwood Recreation Centre

Petrolia is home to a Provincial Junior Hockey League hockey team, the Petrolia Flyers. The town also hosts the Petrolia Squires, a senior hockey team in the Ontario Elite Hockey League. The Squires won the Allan Cup, the senior ice hockey champion trophy of Canada, in 1979 and in 1981.

== Media ==
Until September 2013, The Petrolia Topic was the sole newspaper in the town of Petrolia. It is owned by Osprey Media. In September 2013, The Independent of Petrolia & Central Lambton began publication.

== Notable people ==
- Donald Ferguson Brown, former Canadian politician, barrister, and lawyer
- Jedidiah Goodacre, film actor
- Dale Hunter, retired professional hockey player, and current OHL coach of the London Knights; former head coach of the Washington Capitals
- Dave Hunter, retired professional hockey player who won three Stanley Cups with the Edmonton Oilers in the 1980s
- Mark Hunter, retired professional hockey player and currently co-owner (with brother Dale Hunter), and general manager of the London Knights OHL hockey team
- Michael Leighton, former professional ice hockey goaltender who played for the Carolina Hurricanes, Philadelphia Flyers, Chicago Blackhawks, and the Nashville Predators
- Peter Schiemann, one of the four Royal Canadian Mounted Police constables killed in the Mayerthorpe tragedy
- John Van Boxmeer, retired professional hockey player with the Montreal Canadiens who then transitioned to coaching at the professional level in both the NHL and Europe

== See also ==
- List of townships in Ontario
- Petroleum industry
