= List of people from Sarnia =

This is a list of notable people, past and present, who were born in, residents of, or otherwise closely associated with Sarnia, Ontario, Canada.

== A ==
- Bill Abbott Jr., sailor
- Cam Abbott, hockey player
- Chris Abbott, hockey player
- Joanne Abbott, sailor
- Katie Abbott, sailor
- Matt Abbott, sailor
- Bob Ackles, football administrator
- Stephen Andrews, visual artist
- Doug Armstrong, NHL St. Louis Blues hockey executive
- Neil Armstrong, former NHL linesman and member of the Hockey Hall of Fame

== B ==
- Charles E. Bastien, animation director
- Tim Bernhardt, hockey player
- Jean-Robert Bernier, 38th Canadian Surgeon General, principal medical adviser to the North Atlantic Alliance
- Mark Bice, curler
- Steve Bice, curler
- Richard Beland (photographer), entertainment photographer
- Paul Blundy, politician
- Brad Boston, sailor
- David Boushy, politician
- John Bradley, physician
- Mike Bradley, politician
- Andy Brandt, former city alderman and mayor, former head of the Ontario Progressive Conservative Party, and former chairman and CEO of the LCBO
- Michael A. Brown, former Ontario Speaker of the House
- Nick Bucci, former professional baseball player in the Milwaukee Brewers Farm system
- Shawn Burr, NHL hockey player who played 878 career games and finished with 181 goals and 440 points
- Jerry Butler, hockey player

== C ==
- Leo Cahill, football administrator
- William Campbell, politician
- Mike Ceresia, racquetball player
- David Chilton, author of The Wealthy Barber; panelist on Dragons' Den
- Talia Chiarelli, gymnast
- Dino Ciccarelli, former NHL hockey player who was inducted into the Hockey Hall of Fame in 2010
- Susan Clark, actress
- Dale Clarke, hockey player
- Jim Clayton, musician
- Daryl Cloran, theatre director
- Charlie Cotch, hockey player
- Dave Cranmer, CFL player
- Mike Crombeen, hockey player

== D ==
- Mike Dark, hockey player
- Alex De Carolis, soccer player
- Carrie Delahunt, curler
- Caroline Di Cocco, politician
- James Doohan, actor, "Scotty" on Star Trek; attended Sarnia Collegiate Institute & Technical School
- Robyn Doolittle, journalist
- Rick Dowswell, athlete
- Derek Drouin, athlete

== E ==
- Marian Engel, author
- Eric Ethridge, country pop singer, songwriter, chiropractor
- Lance Evers, professional wrestler known as Lance Storm

== F ==
- Justin Fazio, hockey player
- Ron Fogarty, hockey coach
- Scott Foster, accountant and emergency NHL goaltender
- Brian Francis, novelist
- Jamie Fraser, hockey player
- Kerry Fraser, NHL referee
- Rick Fraser, hockey player

== G ==
- Cheryl Gallant, politician
- Roger Gallaway, politician
- Mike Gardiner, MLB player with the Seattle Mariners, Boston Red Sox, Montreal Expos, and the Detroit Tigers
- Ted Garvin, NHL and AHL coach winner of the Turner Cup
- Brian Groombridge, artist
- Sara Gross, athlete
- Emm Gryner, musician, actress
- Don Gutteridge, writer
- Barbara Gasser, gymnast

== H ==
- Lloyd Haddon, hockey player
- Chris Hadfield, astronaut for whom Sarnia's airport is named; first Canadian to walk in space
- Dave Hadfield, musician
- Wilfred Smith Haney, politician
- Kyp Harness, musician and writer
- George "Duke" Harris, NHL player with the Minnesota North Stars and the Toronto Maple Leafs
- Steve Hazlett, hockey player
- Jordan Hill, hockey player
- Matt Hill, professional golfer, 2009 Jack Nicklaus Award winner; the only golfer besides Tiger Woods to win the Conference, Regional and National Championship in same season
- Jamie Hislop, hockey player
- Mike Hobin, hockey player
- Doug Hocking, CFL player
- Sean Hogan, singer/songwriter, performing recording artist, rock drummer, studied jazz at Humber and Music Industry Arts at Fanshawe College
- Gary Holt, hockey player
- John Hubbell, skater
- Chuck Huizinga, hockey player
- Jim Hunt, sports journalist

== J ==
- Lloyd Douglas Jackson, politician
- Ken James, politician
- Dustin Jeffrey, professional hockey player in the Pittsburgh Penguins organization
- Thomas George Johnston, politician

== K ==
- Karen Kidd, aquatic ecotoxicologist
- Shannon Kee, curler
- Patrick Kerwin, Chief Justice of Canada
- Sami Khan, filmmaker
- Don Knowles, rugby player
- Henry Kock, horticulturist

== L ==
- Mary Lawson, writer
- William Leach, Canadian Armed Forces officer
- Eugene Carlisle LeBel, academician
- Dan Leckie, politician
- Ryan LeDrew, curler
- Stephanie LeDrew, curler
- Hank Lehvonen, hockey player
- Michael Leighton, NHL goalie
- Sunny Leone, Bollywood actress, adult entertainer
- Richard Vryling Lesueur, politician

== M ==
- Kenneth Maaten, athlete
- Roberta MacAdams, politician
- Alexander Mackenzie, the second Prime Minister of Canada; namesake of one of Sarnia's high schools; buried in Sarnia's Lakeview Cemetery
- Ellen MacKinnon, politician
- Dave Madden, actor
- Michael Marinaro, skater
- Helen Marshall, writer and academic
- Cameron Mathison, All My Children actor
- Owen Maynard, engineer
- John McCahill, hockey player
- Scott McCord, actor
- Heath McCormick, curler
- Gary McCracken, musician
- Pauline Mills McGibbon, 22nd Lieutenant Governor of Ontario
- David McGillivray, skater
- Ian McKegney, hockey player
- Tony McKegney, NHL hockey player who scored 20 or more goals in eight seasons of his 900+ game career
- Rick McNair, athlete and writer
- Arnie McWatters, rugby player
- Sid Meier, programmer and designer of several popular computer strategy games
- Wayne Merrick, NHL hockey player who played 774 career games
- Kim Mitchell, rock musician
- Jeremy Molitor, boxer, murderer
- Steve Molitor, boxer, two-time and current International Boxing Federation super bantamweight champion
- Dominic Moore, hockey player
- Robbie Moore, hockey player
- Ian Murray, politician
- Laurence B. Mussio, businessman

== N ==
- Harry Neale, CBC hockey commentator
- Bob Neely, hockey player
- Kraig Nienhuis, player

== O ==
- George Olah, 1994 Nobel Laureate in Chemistry and researcher at Dow Chemical

== P ==
- Frederick Forsyth Pardee, politician
- G. Scott Paterson, businessman
- Nick Paithouski, rugby player
- Rob Palmer, hockey player
- Norm Perry, football player
- Jessica Platt, hockey player
- Marie Prevost, actress

== R ==
- Kim Renders, theatre professional
- Dean Robertson, golfer
- Patricia Rozema, film director
- Katherine Ryan, comedian

== S ==
- Marceil Saddy, politician
- Lloyd St. Amand, politician
- Dave Salmoni, zoologist, animal trainer, and television host on Animal Planet and The Discovery Channel
- Boady Santavy, weightlifter
- Dalas Santavy, weightlifter
- Alfred H. Savage, horticulturalist, transit manager (Toronto Transit Commission, Chicago Transit Authority), municipal manager
- Shelley Scarrow, television producer
- R. Murray Schafer, composer
- Matt Scurfield, musician
- Kevin Sharp, soccer player
- Jason Simon, hockey player
- Rene Simpson, tennis player
- David William Smith, politician
- Mike Stapleton, former NHL player; son of Pat Stapleton
- Pat Stapleton (1940-2020), former NHL player mainly known for his career with the Chicago Black Hawks from 1966-1973. He was the second and final coach of the World Hockey Association Chicago Cougars from 1973-1975. He was elected as an inaugural inductee in the World Hockey Association Hall of Fame in 2010 and the Canada Sports Hall of Fame in 2005.
- Brad Staubitz, hockey player
- Harry Steel, politician
- Taylor Steele, skater
- Hilary Stellingwerff, athlete
- Mike Stevens, legendary harmonica virtuoso, regular on the Grand Ole Opry
- Lance Storm, wrestler
- Bruce Sweeney, film director

== T ==
- Dave Taylor, politician
- Rob Thomson, MLB manager, Philadelphia Phillies
- Wayne Tosh, CFL player
- Keegan Connor Tracy, actress, born Tracy Armstrong

== V ==
- Pat Verbeek, NHL hockey player with the New Jersey Devils, Hartford Whalers, Dallas Stars and Detroit Red Wings; Stanley Cup winner with the Dallas Stars

== W ==
- Carol Wainio, artist
- Angela Walker, tennis player
- Don Ward, former NHL player with the Chicago Blackhawks and Boston Bruins
- Joe Ward, hockey player
- Jim Watson, current mayor of Ottawa
- Mike Weir, PGA Tour golfer, winner of the 2003 Masters
- Paul Wells, journalist, editor, Toronto Star
- Brian West, record producer, musician
- John Wing, Jr., comedian and frequent The Tonight Show with Jay Leno guest
- Donovan Woods, singer-songwriter
- Steve Wormith, CFL player

== Y ==
- Paul Ysebaert, former NHL player
