= William Goodison =

William Goodison may refer to:

- William Goodison (politician)
- William Goodison (surgeon)
