= Mussio =

Mussio is a surname. Notable people with the surname include:

- Anthony John King Mussio (1902–1978), American Catholic prelate
- Laurence B. Mussio (born 1964), Canadian business historian and author
- Magdalo Mussio (1925–2006), Italian writer, artist, film animator and magazine editor
