= Ralph Knox =

Ralph Knox may refer to:

- Ralph Knox (politician) (1905–1981), politician in Ontario, Canada
- Sir Ralph Henry Knox (1836–1913), British civil servant
