= Toronto Sculpture Garden =

Public park in Toronto, Ontario, Canada

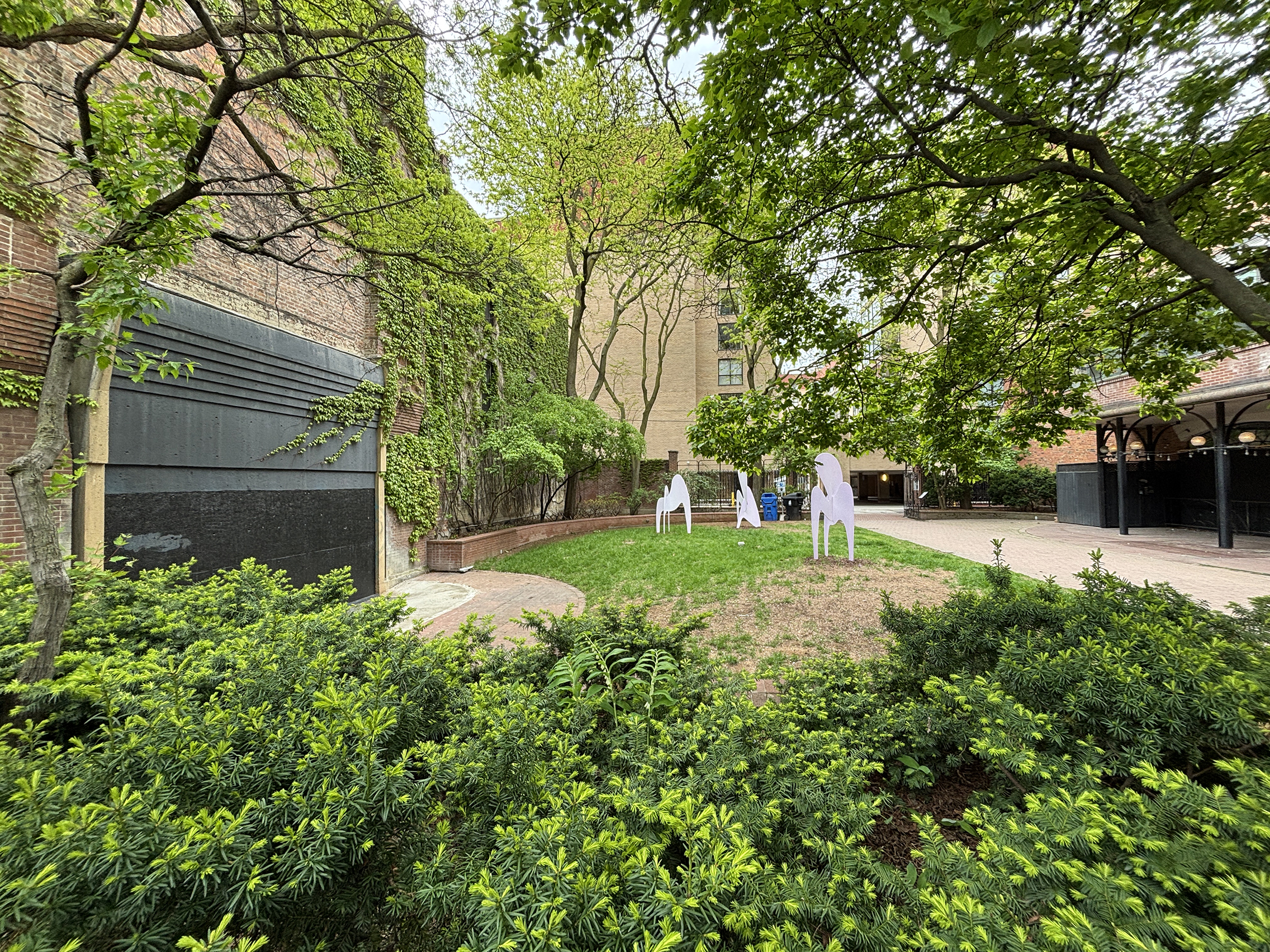
- Toronto Sculpture Garden in 2025

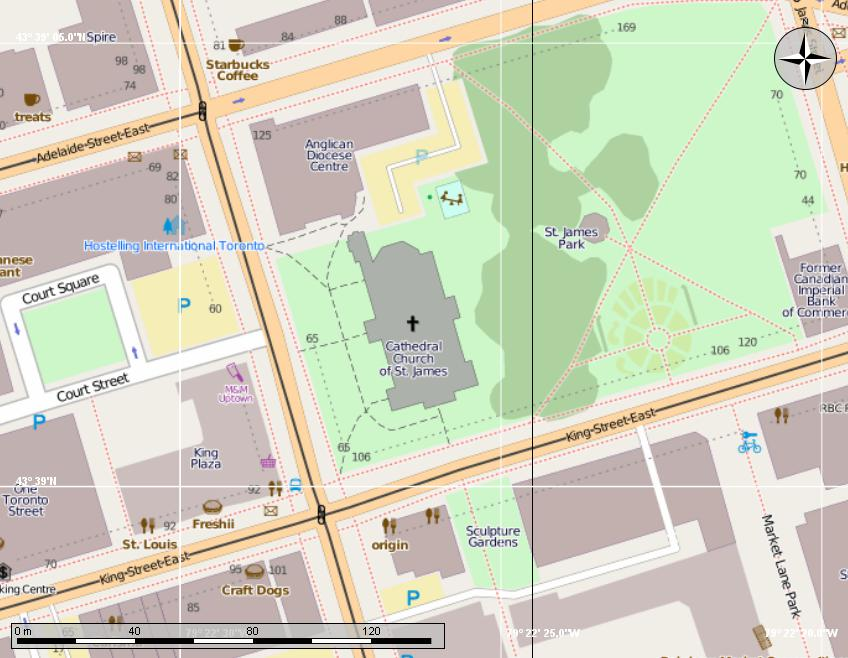
- Type: sculpture garden
- Location: 115 King Street East, Toronto
- Coordinates: 43°38′59″N 79°22′25″W
- Created: 1981
- Operator: Toronto Parks
- Open: 8 am to dusk
- Website: City of Toronto

The Toronto Sculpture Garden is located at 115 King Street East in a small 80 by 100-foot (25 by 30 m) park directly across the street from Cathedral Church of St. James, in Toronto, Ontario, Canada. It operated as an independent entity from 1981 to 2014 and is administered by the city's parks department.

== Amenities ==
The main amenity in the Sculpture Garden is a waterfall fountain along the East wall. The fountain drains into a grille that is 1.063 metres (41.9 inches) wide (left-to-right) by 24 inches (0.61 m) front-to-back. The width of the fountain waterfall is equal to the width of the grille, i.e. 1.063 metres (41.9 inches).

== Exhibits ==
Toronto Sculpture Garden exhibits temporary works of art by various sculptors, and commissions works up to a maximum budget of $30,000. Exhibiting artists have included: Brian Groombridge (1990), Kim Adams (1994), Liz Magor (1997), and Derek Sullivan (artist) (2005).

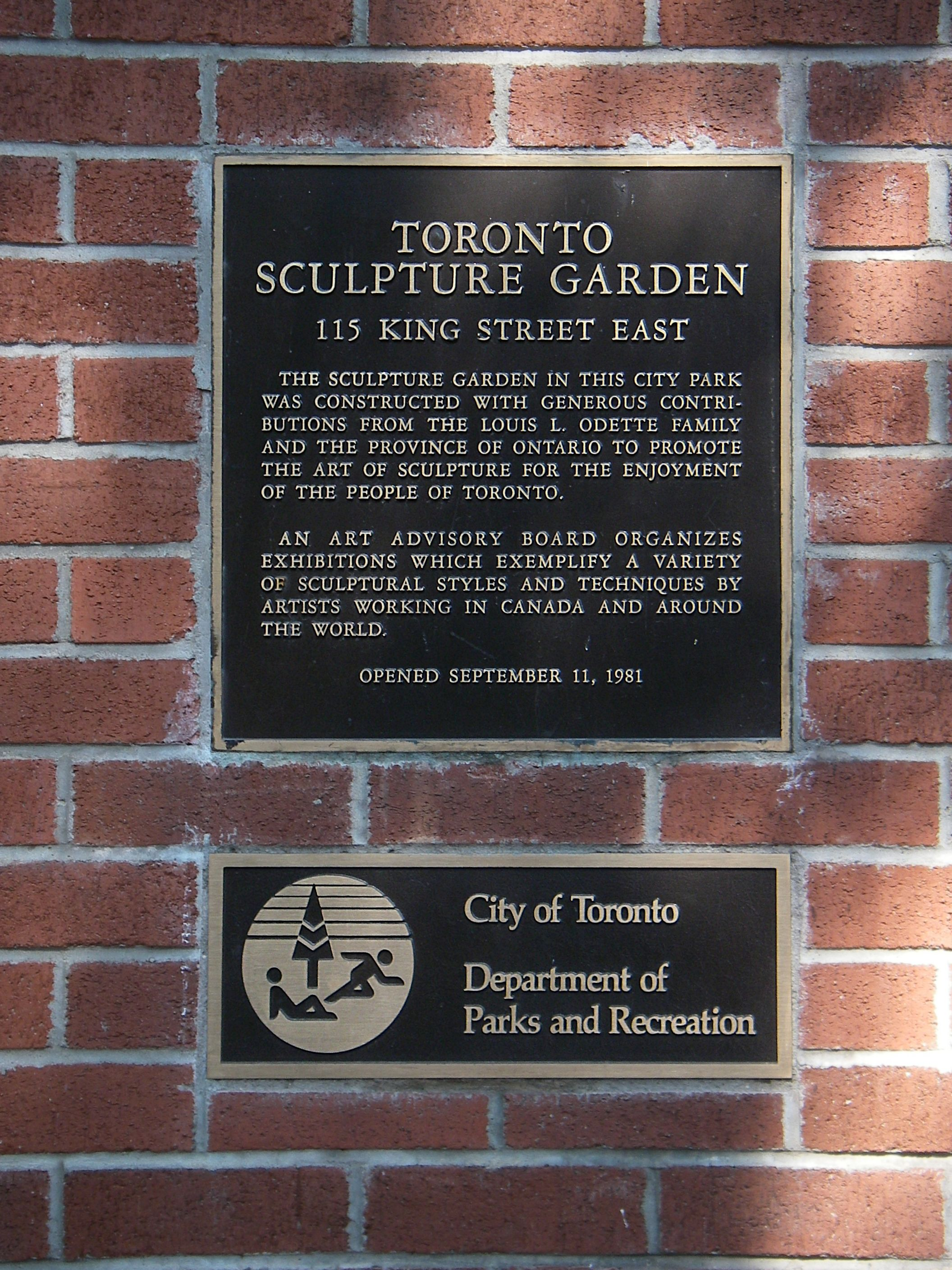
Sign on the brick wall beside the northerly entrance gate to the Toronto Sculpture Garden, on King Street East

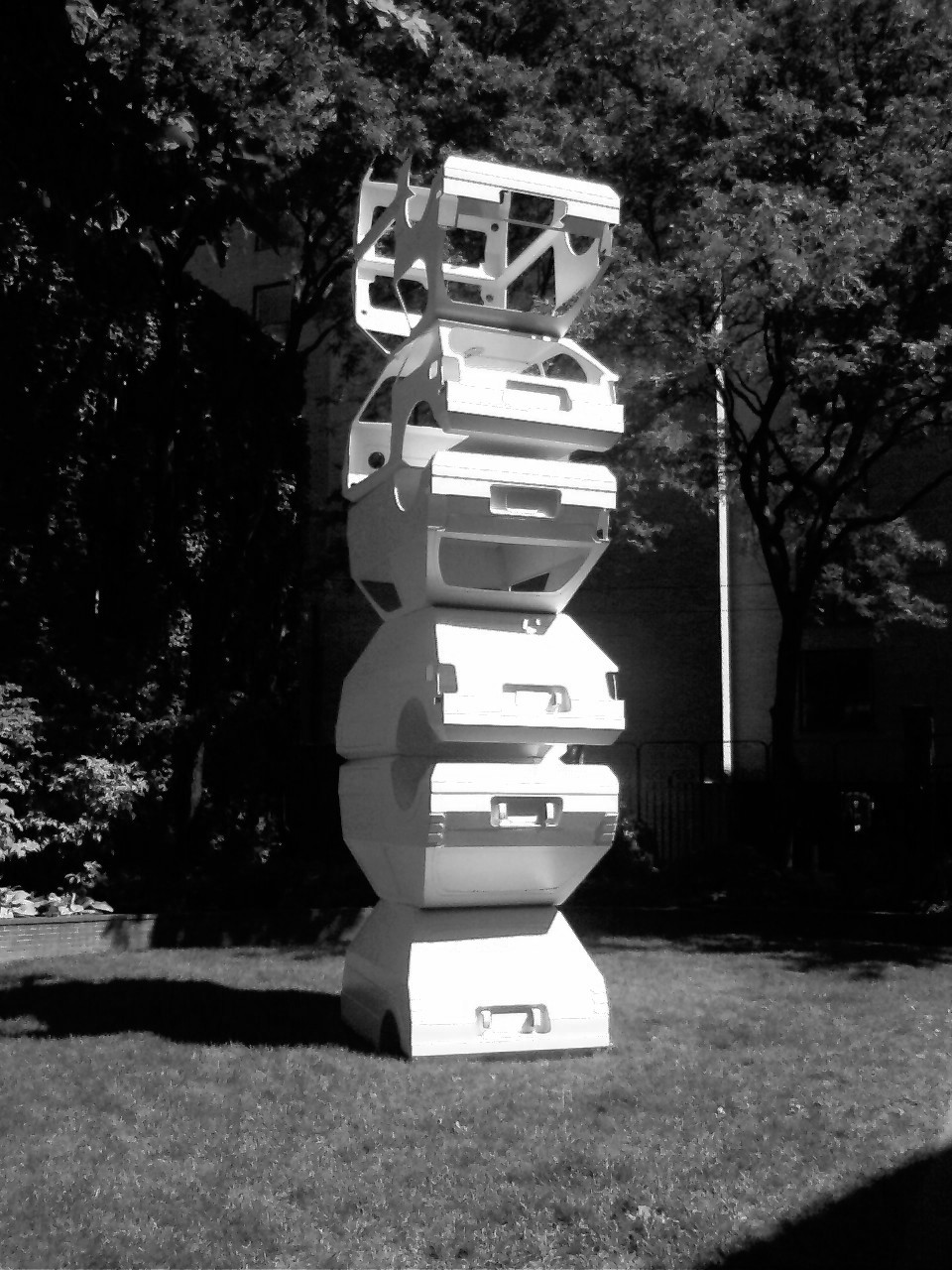
Gold, Silver and Leadby Jed Lind, on display in the Garden from 2011 to 2013

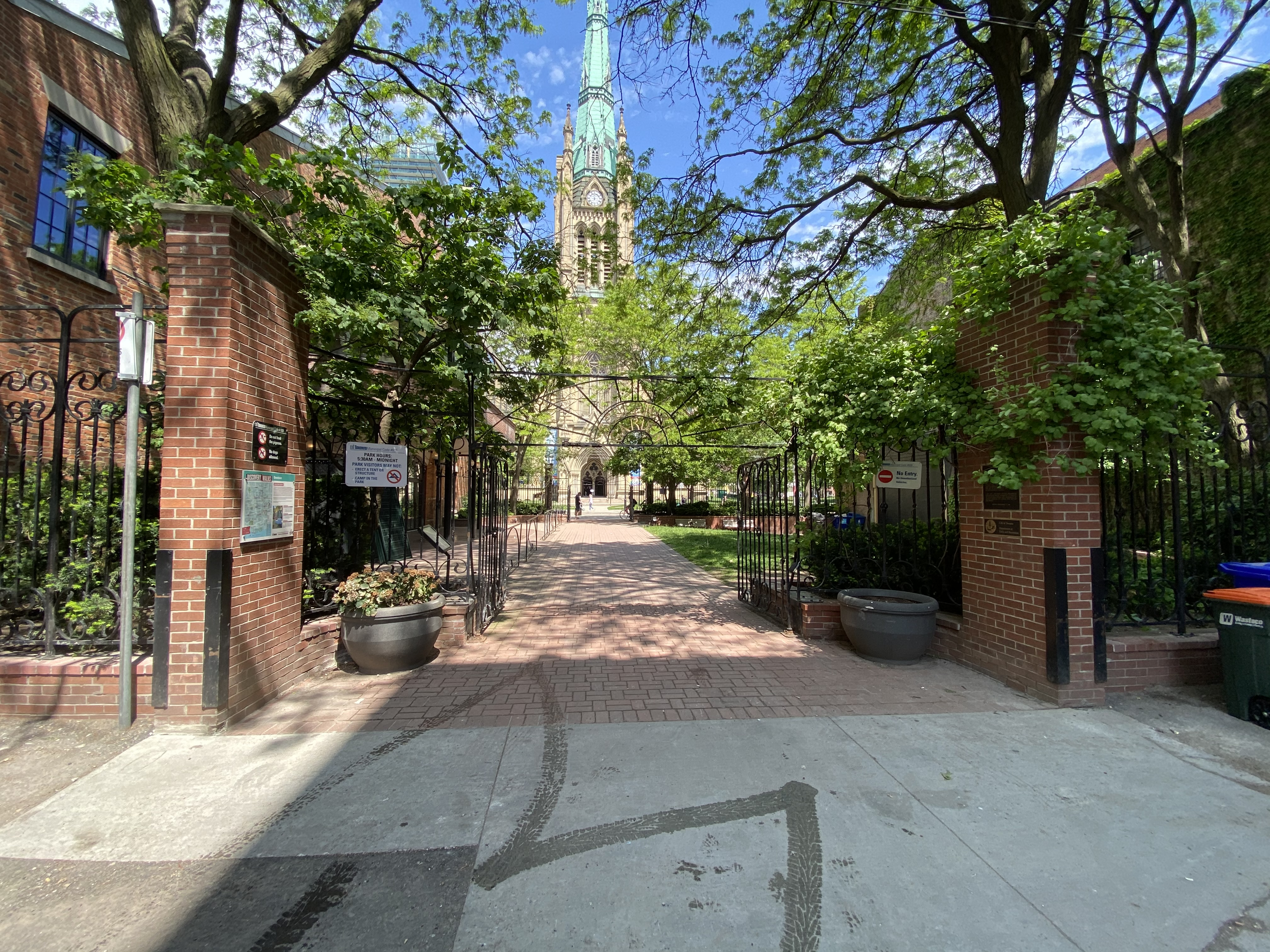
Garden gate
