= Derek Sullivan =

Derek Sullivan may refer to:

- Derrick Sullivan (1930–1983), Welsh footballer
- Derek Sullivan (artist) (born 1976), Canadian artist
