= Charles MacKenzie (merchant) =

Canadian politician (1832–1900)

Ontario MPP
- In office 1889–1894
- Preceded by: Timothy Blair Pardee
- Succeeded by: Alfred Thomas Gurd
- Constituency: Lambton West

Personal details
- Born: October 5, 1832 Dunkeld, Perthshire, Scotland
- Died: September 5, 1900 (aged 67)
- Party: Liberal
- Spouse: Agnes Young (m. 1863)
- Relations: Alexander MacKenzie, brother
- Occupation: Merchant

Charles MacKenzie (October 5, 1832 – September 5, 1900) was an Ontario merchant and political figure. He represented Lambton West in the Legislative Assembly of Ontario as a Liberal member from 1889 to 1894.

He was born in Dunkeld, Perthshire, Scotland in 1832, the son of Alexander Mackenzie, and came to Canada West with his family in 1842. Mackenzie apprenticed in the printing business with George Brown at Toronto before returning to Sarnia where he went into the hardware business with his brother John. Mackenzie married Agnes Young in 1863. He was also an oil dealer in Sarnia and was president of the Lambton Loan and Investment Company. In 1888, he served as warden for Lambton County. He was first elected to the provincial assembly in an 1889 by-election held after the death of Timothy Blair Pardee. Mackenzie was a prominent member of the Freemasons.

His brother Alexander MacKenzie was a Canadian Prime Minister.
