= NSCAD Lithography Workshop =

- Dates: Lithography Workshop: 1969-1976 NSCAD Lithography Workshop: Contemporary Editions: 2017-2019
- Established: 1969
- Location: Halifax, NS
- Addresses: Lithography Workshop, 1969-1976: 6036 Coburg Rd, Halifax, NS B3H 1Y9 (former St. Andrew's United Church Hall) NSCAD Lithography Workshop: Contemporary Editions, 2017-2019: 5163 Duke St, Halifax, NS B3J 3J6
- Website: litho.nscad.ca

The NSCAD Lithography Workshop was a program active at NSCAD University from 1969 to 1976 that gave practicing artists the opportunity to visit the school and produce limited edition prints in collaboration with a Master printer. The workshop allowed NSCAD students to witness professional artists develop their ideas and create work through the medium of printmaking. The Lithography Workshop succeeded in elevating the status of the school, both in terms of innovation and technical capacity.

== History ==
The Lithography Workshop was initially created during the tenure of NSCAD President Garry Neill Kennedy, who was hired in 1967.

In 1968 Kennedy recruited Gerald Ferguson, originally his colleague from Ohio University, where they both received their Masters of Fine Art (Kennedy in 1965 and Ferguson in 1966). It was through Ferguson that Kennedy was introduced to Jack Lemon at the Kansas City Art Institute. Lemon was trained as a Master printer at the Tamarind Lithography Workshop in Los Angeles (founded in 1960 'as a means to 'rescue' the dying art of lithography") and had set up his own workshop in Kansas City, where he aided artists in producing limited-edition lithographs.

Kennedy saw how this collaborative program could be beneficial if facilitated at NSCAD, with the "...objective of introducing into Canada the renaissance in Lithography begun ten years earlier at the Tamarind Workshop in America."

In 1968, Kennedy appointed Lemon to build the print studios and direct the workshop. This project was funded by the Canadian federal government, which was interested in financing technical post-secondary institutions in Canada during the 1960s. Kennedy also hired Robert Rogers, who worked with Lemon in Kansas City and was connected to the Tamarind Institute, to work as the Master printer of the workshop.

The print facilities for the Lithography Workshop were finished by autumn of 1968 and the space was operational by January 1969.

In 1970 Ferguson became the workshop's director. He had a goal of bringing in more international artists, specifically conceptual artists to participate in the workshop. The Conceptual Art movement was gaining traction at this time, both internationally and at NSCAD, however not all work created through the Lithography Workshop at this time was concerned with conceptual art ideas. Art historian Jayne Wark writes in "Conceptual Lithography at the Nova Scotia College of Art and Design" "Although many of the NSCAD prints demonstrated a strong alignment with conceptual art’s concerns and preoccupations, these certainly did not constitute the totality of the Lithography Workshop’s output."

"Nova Scotia College of Art and Design (NSCAD) was both an integral player in facilitating conceptual art in general, and an early example of the ways conceptual art was implicated in commercial culture through the sales generated by its Lithography Workshop."

By 1976, the Lithography Workshop faded out due to "financial restraint and shifting priorities." There was a shift in the school's resources to the NSCAD Press and its publishing projects, as the Press had also been operating for three years by this point, although much of the funding was being used by the Workshop. It was felt by Kennedy that the activities of the Press were becoming more relevant to the development of the art world.

=== Directors and Printers ===
==== Directors ====
- Jack Lemon: 1968–1970
- Gerry Ferguson: 1970–1971
- Garry Neill Kennedy: 1972–1973
- Jim Davies (acting director during Kennedy's absence): 1974
- Garry Kennedy: 1975–1980

==== Managing Directors ====
- Richards Jarden: 1971–1972
- Wallace Brannen: 1972–1974
- John Hutcheson: 1975–1976
- Libby Hutcheson: 1975
- Julie Duschenes (Acting): 1976
- Murray Lively: 1977–1980

==== Master Printers & Additional Printers ====
- Robert Rogers: 1969–1971
- Wallace Brannen: 1971–1974
- John Hutcheson: 1974–1975
- Murray Lively: 1974–1980
- Including: C.B. Manson, Charles Levine, Christopher Manson, Jerry Raidiger, Michael Armetrout, Perry Tymeson, Ray Lind, and Ted Ross.

== Objectives ==
The NSCAD Lithography Workshop adopted the Tamarind Institute's philosophy where an artist would spend time in the shop, work with a team and become familiar with the materials. This allowed the artists to become involved with the process from start to finish, without themselves having to attain the skills of a Master printer.

The main objectives of the Lithography Workshop were "to build up a fully equipped, high-quality printmaking program in lithography and intaglio; to attract international professional artists to the College; to provide students with direct contact with these artists as they worked through the printmaking process; and to raise income for the College though the sale of prints."

The Lithography Workshop produced editions of fifty prints per artist, where half went to the artist and the other half was sold by the school.

== Participants and gallery shows ==
By the end of the Lithography Workshop's run there had been nearly 200 prints created by the many artists who participated. Various sources claim that between 191 and 197 prints were generated by anywhere from 76 to 79 different artists.

Lithography Workshop's Year by Year Production
Year	Number of Prints	Number of Participating Artists
1969	6	3
1970	30	16
1971	29	15
1972	10	10
1973	26	10
1974	61	15
1975	31	13
1976	4	4

The Lithography Workshop received criticism for the lack of women participants in the workshop, as well as within the regular studio faculty. Of the participating artists six were women. These artists were Joyce Wieland (1970), Carol Fraser (1974), Carole Condé (1974), Agnes Denes (1974), Miriam Schapiro (1975) and Felicity Redgrave (1976).

Other notable artists include James Lee Byars, John Baldessari, Dan Graham, Sol LeWitt, Robert Smithson, Mel Bochner, Joseph Kosuth, Vito Acconci, Dennis Oppenheim and Lawrence Weiner.

The lithographs produced were exhibited at both the Museum of Modern Art (MoMA) and the National Gallery of Canada in 1971, the Art Gallery of Ontario from June 1975 - June 1976, and in an exhibition organized by the Land Grant Universities of New England in the United States in the mid-1980s.

Notable works produced by the Lithography Workshop include Joyce Wieland's "O Canada", a piece where she kissed the lithography stone while wearing lipstick, with her lips forming the words of the Canadian National Anthem "O Canada". John Baldessari's "I Will Not Make Any More Boring Art" requested that NSCAD students copy this line onto the Anna Leonowens Gallery walls over and over again, with the handwritten example sent by Baldessari eventually being turned into a print.

In 1971 conceptual artist Sol Le Witt worked with the Lithography Workshop on a project where he proposed ten prints that would be executed by students and the Master printer. He sent written instructions by mail which were then interpreted by the students.

== NSCAD Lithography Workshop: Contemporary Editions ==
In 2017, The Anna Leonowens Gallery received a Canada Council New Chapter grant of $285,000, allowing for the Lithography Workshop to be reopened. Over the next two years, eight contemporary Canadian artists worked alongside Tamarind-certified Master printer Jill Graham to produce limited-edition lithographic prints.

The artists involved included Shuvinai Ashoona, Jordan Bennett, Shary Boyle, Brendan Fernandes, Amy Malbeuf, Ed Pien, Derek Sullivan and Ericka Walker. As stated on the NSCAD Lithography Workshop website, this reopening of the workshop focuses on the relationship of art communities between Nova Scotia and Kinngait, central to their initiative to decolonize the arts through the joint engagement of these communities, carried out through the collaboration of artists, specifically within the practice of printmaking.

"This project also recognizes the historic relationship between NSCAD and Kinngait Studios and contributes to the emerging critical discourse surrounding decolonizing practices within the arts. It formalizes community collaboration and shared creative space between new artists and printers in both Cape Dorset and Nova Scotia, suggesting the kind of cross-cultural exchange that arctic communities and institutions already thrive on, and that are imperative for the rest of Canada to begin engaging with."

The NSCAD Lithography Workshop: Contemporary Editions collection was on display at the Art Gallery of Nova Scotia from Saturday November 9, 2019 to Sunday April 26, 2020.
