= Lambton West (provincial electoral district) =

Former provincial riding in Ontario

Ontario electoral district

Defunct provincial electoral district
- Legislature: Legislative Assembly of Ontario
- District created: 1875
- District abolished: 1966
- First contested: 1875
- Last contested: 1963

Lambton West was an electoral riding in Ontario, Canada. It was created in 1875 from the western portion of Lambton, and was centred on Sarnia. It was abolished in 1966 before the 1967 election. Most of the urban portion became Sarnia, while the more rural portion was merged with Lambton East to form a recreated Lambton.

== Members of Provincial Parliament ==
Lambton West
Assembly	Years	Member	Party
3rd	1875–1879	Timothy Blair Pardee	Liberal
4th	1879–1883	Timothy Blair Pardee	Liberal
5th	1883–1886	Timothy Blair Pardee	Liberal
6th	1886–1889	Timothy Blair Pardee	Liberal
6th	1889–1890	Charles MacKenzie	Liberal
7th	1890–1894	Charles MacKenzie	Liberal
8th	1894–1898	Alfred Thomas Gurd	Protestant Protective Association
9th	1898–1902	Frederick Forsyth Pardee	Liberal
10th	1902–1904	William John Hanna	Conservative
11th	1905–1908	William John Hanna	Conservative
12th	1908–1911	William John Hanna	Conservative
13th	1911–1914	William John Hanna	Conservative
14th	1914–1919	William John Hanna	Conservative
15th	1919–1923	Jonah Moorehouse Webster	United Farmers
16th	1923–1926	Wilfred Smith Haney	Conservative
17th	1926–1929	Wilfred Smith Haney	Conservative
18th	1929–1934	Andrew Robinson McMillen	Conservative
19th	1934–1937	William Guthrie	Liberal
20th	1937–1943	William Guthrie	Liberal
21st	1943–1945	Harry Steel	Co-operative Commonwealth
22nd	1945–1948	Bryan Cathcart	Progressive Conservative
23rd	1948–1951	Bryan Cathcart	Progressive Conservative
24th	1951–1955	Bryan Cathcart	Progressive Conservative
25th	1955–1959	Bryan Cathcart	Progressive Conservative
26th	1959–1963	Bryan Cathcart	Progressive Conservative
27th	1963–1967	Ralph Knox	Progressive Conservative
Sourced from the Ontario Legislative Assembly
Redistributed into Lambton and Sarnia before the 1967 election

== Election results ==
1963 Ontario general election
Party	Candidate	Votes	%	±%
Progressive Conservative	Ralph Knox	10,813	44.69	–3.85
Liberal	William Rogers	10,175	42.05	+2.87
New Democratic	Alex Grabove	3,207	13.25	+0.98
Total valid votes		24,195	99.04	
Total rejected ballots		234	0.96	–0.45
Turnout		24,429	63.23	+0.63
Eligible voters		38,636		
Progressive Conservative hold		Swing		–3.36
Source: Elections Ontario

1959 Ontario general election
Party	Candidate	Votes	%	±%
Progressive Conservative	Bryan Cathcart	10,861	48.54	–7.91
Liberal	Ruth Donohue	8,767	39.18	+8.55
Co-operative Commonwealth	Howard Leslie Humphrey	2,746	12.27	–0.64
Total valid votes		22,374	98.59	
Total rejected ballots		320	1.41	+0.39
Turnout		22,694	62.60	+2.79
Eligible voters		36,252		
Progressive Conservative hold		Swing		–8.23
Source: Elections Ontario

1955 Ontario general election
Party	Candidate	Votes	%	±%
Progressive Conservative	Bryan Cathcart	10,767	56.45	–2.68
Liberal	Murray M. Philpott	5,843	30.64	+4.22
Co-operative Commonwealth	William Whitton	2,462	12.91	–1.54
Total valid votes		19,072	98.98	
Total rejected ballots		197	1.02	–0.35
Turnout		19,269	59.81	–4.40
Eligible voters		32,216		
Progressive Conservative hold		Swing		–3.45
Source: Elections Ontario

1951 Ontario general election
Party	Candidate	Votes	%	±%
Progressive Conservative	Bryan Cathcart	10,814	59.13	+10.24
Liberal	Marcella Brown	4,831	26.42	–6.77
Co-operative Commonwealth	Arthur Last	2,642	14.45	–3.47
Total valid votes		18,287	98.63	
Total rejected ballots		254	1.37	+0.15
Turnout		18,541	64.21	–1.93
Eligible voters		28,875		
Progressive Conservative hold		Swing		+8.50
Source: Elections Ontario

1948 Ontario general election
Party	Candidate	Votes	%	±%
Progressive Conservative	Bryan Cathcart	7,765	48.90	+6.28
Liberal	David Allan Harding	5,270	33.19	–3.70
Co-operative Commonwealth	Martha Scarrow	2,845	17.92	–2.58
Total valid votes		15,880	98.78	
Total rejected ballots		196	1.22	+0.36
Turnout		16,076	66.15	–10.29
Eligible voters		24,304		
Progressive Conservative hold		Swing		+4.99
Source: Elections Ontario

1945 Ontario general election
Party	Candidate	Votes	%	±%
Progressive Conservative	Bryan Cathcart	7,255	42.61	+10.51
Liberal	William Guthrie	6,280	36.89	+4.13
Co-operative Commonwealth	Harry Steel	3,490	20.50	–14.64
Total valid votes		17,025	99.14	
Total rejected ballots		148	0.86	–0.20
Turnout		17,173	76.43	+8.62
Eligible voters		22,468		
Progressive Conservative gain from Co-operative Commonwealth		Swing		+12.58
Source: Elections Ontario

1943 Ontario general election
Party	Candidate	Votes	%	±%
Co-operative Commonwealth	Harry Steel	4,967	35.14	–
Liberal	William Guthrie	4,630	32.76	–28.52
Progressive Conservative	Joseph Warner Murphy	4,537	32.10	–6.62
Total valid votes		14,134	98.94	
Total rejected ballots		151	1.06	+0.11
Turnout		14,285	67.81	–7.48
Eligible voters		21,066		
Co-operative Commonwealth gain from Liberal		Swing		+3.31
Source: Elections Ontario

1937 Ontario general election
Party	Candidate	Votes	%	±%
Liberal	William Guthrie	8,341	61.28	+6.53
Conservative	John A. Huey	5,271	38.72	+0.87
Total valid votes		13,612	99.05	
Total rejected ballots		130	0.95	+0.06
Turnout		13,742	75.29	–1.27
Eligible voters		18,251		
Liberal hold		Swing		+2.83
Source: Elections Ontario

1934 Ontario general election
Party	Candidate	Votes	%	±%
Liberal	William Guthrie	7,473	54.75	+9.72
Conservative	Andrew Robinson McMillen	5,166	37.85	–17.12
Independent	Howard Leslie Humphrey	1,010	7.40	–
Total valid votes		13,649	99.11	
Total rejected ballots		122	0.89	+0.31
Turnout		13,771	76.57	+14.68
Eligible voters		17,986		
Liberal gain from Conservative		Swing		+13.42
Source: Elections Ontario

1929 Ontario general election
Party	Candidate	Votes	%	±%
Conservative	Andrew Robinson McMillen	5,724	54.97	–5.75
Liberal	William W. Miller	4,689	45.03	–
Total valid votes		10,413	99.43	
Total rejected ballots		60	0.57	–0.04
Turnout		10,473	61.88	–6.85
Eligible voters		16,924		
Conservative hold		Swing		–2.87
Source: Elections Ontario

1926 Ontario general election
Party	Candidate	Votes	%	±%
Conservative	Wilfred Smith Haney	7,092	60.72	+14.76
Progressive Party	Robert John White	4,588	39.28	–
Total valid votes		11,680	99.39	
Total rejected ballots		72	0.61	–0.02
Turnout		11,752	68.73	+8.55
Eligible voters		17,098		
Conservative hold		Swing		+7.38
Source: Elections Ontario

1923 Ontario general election
Party	Candidate	Votes	%	±%
Conservative	Wilfred Smith Haney	6,022	45.96	+18.17
United Farmers	Jonah Moorehouse Webster	3,903	29.78	–10.64
Liberal	Thomas Henry Cook	3,179	24.26	–
Total valid votes		13,104	99.37	
Total rejected ballots		83	0.63	–2.25
Turnout		13,187	60.18	–18.74
Eligible voters		21,913		
Conservative gain from United Farmers		Swing		+9.08
Source: Elections Ontario

1919 Ontario general election
Party	Candidate	Votes	%	±%
United Farmers	Jonah Moorehouse Webster	6,081	40.42	–
Labour	James Sinclair Crawford	4,782	31.79	–
Conservative	Peter Gardiner	4,180	27.79	–27.92
Total valid votes		15,043	97.12	
Total rejected ballots		446	2.88	+2.33
Turnout		15,489	78.92	–1.31
Eligible voters		19,626		
United Farmers gain from Conservative		Swing		–
Source: Elections Ontario

1914 Ontario general election
Party	Candidate	Votes	%	±%
Conservative	William John Hanna	3,924	55.71	–2.01
Liberal	John Cowan	3,120	44.29	+2.01
Total valid votes		7,044	99.45	
Total rejected ballots		39	0.55	+0.13
Turnout		7,083	80.23	+12.38
Eligible voters		8,828		
Conservative hold		Swing		–2.01
Source: Elections Ontario

1911 Ontario general election
Party	Candidate	Votes	%	±%
Conservative	William John Hanna	3,969	57.71	+3.26
Liberal	William Anderson Henderson	2,908	42.29	–3.26
Total valid votes		6,877	99.58	
Total rejected ballots		29	0.42	–0.34
Turnout		6,906	67.85	–12.13
Eligible voters		10,178		
Conservative hold		Swing		+3.26
Source: Elections Ontario

1908 Ontario general election
Party	Candidate	Votes	%	±%
Conservative	William John Hanna	3,841	54.45	–
Liberal	Robert Irwin Towers	3,213	45.55	–
Total valid votes		7,054	99.24	
Total rejected ballots		54	0.76	–
Turnout		7,108	79.98	–
Eligible voters		8,887		
Conservative hold		Swing		+0.00
Source: Elections Ontario

Ontario provincial by-election, February 21, 1905 Ministerial By-election, Provincial Secretary and Registrar
Party	Candidate	Votes
Conservative	William John Hanna	acclaimed
Source: Elections Ontario

1905 Ontario general election
Party	Candidate	Votes	%	±%
Conservative	William John Hanna	4,201	54.01	+3.00
Liberal	Frederick Forsyth Pardee	3,577	45.99	–3.00
Total valid votes		7,778	99.54	
Total rejected ballots		36	0.46	–0.26
Turnout		7,814	80.75	+3.61
Eligible voters		9,677		
Conservative hold		Swing		+3.00
Source: Elections Ontario

1902 Ontario general election
Party	Candidate	Votes	%	±%
Conservative	William John Hanna	3,847	51.01	+4.74
Liberal	Frederick Forsyth Pardee	3,695	48.99	–4.74
Total valid votes		7,542	99.28	
Total rejected ballots		55	0.72	+0.01
Turnout		7,597	77.13	+9.01
Eligible voters		9,849		
Conservative gain from Liberal		Swing		+4.74
Source: Elections Ontario

1898 Ontario general election
Party	Candidate	Votes	%	±%
Liberal	Frederick Forsyth Pardee	3,600	53.73	+4.46
Conservative	Alfred Thomas Gurd	3,100	46.27	–4.46
Total valid votes		6,700	99.29	
Total rejected ballots		48	0.71	+0.05
Turnout		6,748	68.13	+4.49
Eligible voters		9,905		
Liberal gain from Conservative-Protestant Protective		Swing		+4.46
Source: Elections Ontario

1894 Ontario general election
Party	Candidate	Votes	%	±%
Conservative-Protestant Protective	Alfred Thomas Gurd	3,044	50.73	–
Liberal	Charles MacKenzie	2,956	49.27	–6.19
Total valid votes		6,000	99.34	
Total rejected ballots		40	0.66	–0.04
Turnout		6,040	63.63	+7.60
Eligible voters		9,492		
Conservative-Protestant Protective gain from Liberal		Swing		+3.10
Source: Elections Ontario

1890 Ontario general election
Party	Candidate	Votes	%	±%
Liberal	Charles MacKenzie	2,748	55.46	–
Conservative	W. W. Fitzgerald	2,035	41.07	–
Equal Rights	Mr. Colter	172	3.47	–
Total valid votes		4,955	99.30	
Total rejected ballots		35	0.70	–
Turnout		4,990	56.04	–
Eligible voters		8,905		
Liberal hold		Swing		–
Source: Elections Ontario

Ontario provincial by-election, October 19, 1889 Death of Timothy Blair Pardee
Party	Candidate	Votes	%	±%
Liberal	Charles MacKenzie	acclaimed		
Source: Elections Ontario

1886 Ontario general election
Party	Candidate	Votes	%	±%
Liberal	Timothy Blair Pardee	2,541	54.88	–0.38
Labour	Alfred P. Wright	2,089	45.12	–
Total valid votes		4,630	99.40	
Total rejected ballots		28	0.60	–0.22
Turnout		4,658	60.90	+3.28
Eligible voters		7,648		
Liberal hold		Swing		–0.19
Source: Elections Ontario

1883 Ontario general election
Party	Candidate	Votes	%	±%
Liberal	Timothy Blair Pardee	1,943	55.26	+1.80
Conservative	Mr. Watson	1,573	44.74	–1.80
Total valid votes		3,516	99.18	
Total rejected ballots		29	0.82	+0.82
Turnout		3,545	57.62	–5.62
Eligible voters		6,152		
Liberal hold		Swing		+1.80
Source: Elections Ontario

1879 Ontario general election
Party	Candidate	Votes	%	±%
Liberal	Timothy Blair Pardee	1,759	53.47	−11.07
Conservative	J.B. McGarvey	1,531	46.53	+11.07
Total valid votes		3,290	63.24	+6.02
Eligible voters		5,202		
Liberal hold		Swing		−11.07
Source: Elections Ontario

1875 Ontario general election
Party	Candidate	Votes	%
Liberal	Timothy Blair Pardee	1,372	64.53
Conservative	R.S. Chalmers	754	35.47
Turnout		2,126	57.23
Eligible voters		3,715	
Liberal pickup new district.			
Source: Elections Ontario
