= Jonah Moorehouse Webster =

Canadian politician from Ontario

Member of the Ontario Provincial Parliament for Lambton West
- In office October 20, 1919 – May 10, 1923
- Preceded by: William John Hanna
- Succeeded by: Wilfred Smith Haney

Personal details
- Party: United Farmers of Ontario

Jonah Moorehouse Webster was a Canadian politician from the United Farmers of Ontario. He represented Lambton West in the Legislative Assembly of Ontario from 1919 to 1923.

== See also ==
- 15th Parliament of Ontario
