= Bryan Cathcart =

Canadian politician

Ontario MPP
- In office 1945–1963
- Preceded by: Harry Steel
- Succeeded by: Ralph Knox
- Constituency: Lambton West

Personal details
- Born: January 26, 1896; Spokane, Washington, U.S.
- Died: September 18, 1979 (aged 83); Sarnia, Ontario, Canada
- Political party: Progressive Conservative
- Spouse: Hazel Sutton
- Occupation: Merchant

Bryan Lewis Cathcart (November 4, 1896 – September 18, 1979) was a Canadian politician who was a Member of Provincial Parliament in Legislative Assembly of Ontario from 1945 to 1963. He represented the riding of Lambton West for the Ontario Progressive Conservative Party. Born in Spokane, Washington, he was a merchant. He died at a Sarnia hospital in 1979.

Ontario provincial government of John Robarts
Ontario provincial government of Leslie Frost
Cabinet post (1)
Predecessor	Office	Successor
Louis-Pierre Cécile	Minister of Travel and Publicity; 1955-1963	James Auld
