= Walter Frank Foy =

Canadian politician (1908–1993)

- Official 1993 portrait

Member of Parliament for Lambton West
- In office June 1962 – April 1968

Personal details
- Born: 31 December 1908 Peterborough, Ontario, Canada
- Died: 2 December 1993 (aged 84)
- Party: Liberal
- Profession: life insurance underwriter

Walter Frank Foy (31 December 1908 – 2 December 1993) was a Liberal party member of the House of Commons of Canada. He was born in Peterborough, Ontario, and became a life insurance underwriter by career.

He was first elected at the Lambton West riding in the 1962 general election by a slim margin of four votes, then re-elected there in 1963 and 1965. In 1968, Foy left federal politics after completing his term in the 27th Canadian Parliament and did not seek further re-election.

1962 Canadian federal election: Lambton
Party	Candidate	Votes
Liberal	Walter Frank Foy	14,292
Progressive Conservative	Joseph Warner Murphy	11,292
New Democratic	James D. Kimmerly	6,249
Social Credit	Charles McAmmond Routley	524

1963 Canadian federal election: Lambton
Party	Candidate	Votes
Liberal	Walter Frank Foy	15,978
Progressive Conservative	David Mackay Jackson	12,592
New Democratic	Jim Kimmerly	3,626
Social Credit	Larry Verheyden	264

1965 Canadian federal election: Lambton
Party	Candidate	Votes
Liberal	Walter Frank Foy	12,805
Progressive Conservative	Richard W. Ford	12,230
New Democratic	Mark Abbott	7,346

== Sources ==
=== News ===
- "Nominated By Margin Of 4 Votes". Windsor Star. 13 April 1962. p. 3 – via Newspapers.com.
- "Eight Running in Lambton, Kent Ridings". Windsor Star. 6 November 1965. p. 2 – via Newspapers.com.

=== Websites ===
- "Walter Frank Foy, M.P." Parliament of Canada.
