= William Guthrie (politician) =

Canadian politician (1884–1954)

Ontario MPP
- In office 1934–1943
- Preceded by: Andrew Robinson McMillen
- Succeeded by: Harry Steel
- Constituency: Lambton West

Personal details
- Born: February 22, 1884 Point Edward, Ontario
- Died: December 7, 1954 (aged 70) Sarnia, Ontario
- Party: Liberal
- Spouse: Ida May Dunford (m. 1907)
- Occupation: Farmer

William Guthrie (February 22, 1884 – December 7, 1954) was an Ontario farmer and political figure. He represented Lambton West in the Legislative Assembly of Ontario as a Liberal member from 1934 to 1943.

He was born in Point Edward, Ontario, the son of Archibald Guthrie, and was educated in Sarnia Township. On November 6, 1907 he married Ida May Dunford. They had seven children. He was a market gardener. Guthrie defeated Andrew Robinson McMillen to win the provincial seat in 1934. He was defeated by Harry Steel in 1943. He died in 1956.
