= William John Hanna =

Canadian politician

Ontario MPP
- In office 1902–1919
- Preceded by: Frederick Forsyth Pardee
- Succeeded by: Jonah Moorehouse Webster
- Constituency: Lambton West

Personal details
- Born: October 13, 1862 Adelaide Township, Middlesex County, Canada West
- Died: March 20, 1919 (aged 56) Augusta, Georgia
- Party: Conservative
- Spouses: Jean Gibson Neil (m. 1891–1896) Maud McAdams (m. 1896)
- Children: 3 William Neil Hanna (b.1895 d. 1918); Margaret Mary Hanna (b.1897 d.1958); Katherine Hanna (b.1900)
- Occupation: Lawyer

William John Hanna, KC (October 13, 1862 – March 20, 1919) was a lawyer and political figure in Ontario, Canada. He represented Lambton West in the Legislative Assembly of Ontario from 1902 to 1919 as a Conservative member.

Hanna served as Acting Premier of Ontario from 25 September 1914 to 2 October 1914, after the death of Sir James Whitney, before Sir William Hearst.

== Background ==
He was born in Adelaide Township, Middlesex County, Canada West, the son of George Hanna and Jane Murdock, and moved to Brooke Township in Lambton County with his family in 1871. He attended Sarnia Collegiate Institute and, after graduating, taught at a primary school near his home for three years. He then studied law at Osgoode Hall in Toronto, Ontario, was called to the bar in 1890 and set up practice in Sarnia. He married Jean Gibson Neil in 1891, in Point Edward, Ontario. They had one son, William Neil. He then married Maud MacAdams, in Sarnia, Ontario in 1896 after the death of his first wife. In 1908, Hanna was named King's Counsel. He served as counsel and director for the Imperial Oil Company in Sarnia.

== Politics ==
Hanna was unsuccessful in the federal elections of 1896 and 1900 before being elected to the provincial assembly in 1902. He served as Provincial Secretary and Registrar from 1905 to 1916. In 1915, Hanna initiated an overhaul of Ontario's prison systems by closing down facilities which treated prisoners harshly, and he took special interest in improving the operations of prisons in Ontario to be more humane. That legacy remains in Toronto's Liberty Village whose name comes from the neighbourhood's main road, Liberty Street, near the former site of Toronto's Central Prison, which was closed by Hanna.

In 1916, Hanna introduced the Ontario Temperance Act, which prohibited the sale of alcohol except for medicinal purposes or use in church services for the remainder of World War I. Hanna also served as an adviser to Prime Minister Robert Laird Borden. In 1917, he was named food controller for Canada, charged with dealing with food shortages and inflation near the end of the war. He resigned from his position in January 1918 due to poor health. However, he became president of Imperial Oil later that year.

Near the end of 1918, the Hanna family had been shaken by the death in Italy of his son, William Neil, a Royal Air Force lieutenant. Hanna went south for the winter to deal with the shock and his own failing health. While in Augusta, Georgia, he suffered a stroke and died. After a Methodist service, he was buried in Lakeview Cemetery in Sarnia.

== Legacy ==
Hanna Avenue in Liberty Village, site of the Central Prison for which he closed, is named in his honour.
