= Ross Gray (politician) =

Canadian politician

Member of Parliament for Lambton West
- In office January 1929 – June 1945
- Preceded by: William Thomas Goodison
- Succeeded by: Joseph Warner Murphy

Personal details
- Born: Ross Wilfred Gray; 5 January 1897 Moore Township, Ontario
- Died: 11 December 1968 (aged 71)
- Party: Liberal
- Spouse(s): Gertrude K. Wiley m. 10 October 1925
- Profession: barrister

Ross Wilfred Gray (5 January 1897 – 11 December 1968) was a Liberal party member of the House of Commons of Canada. He was born in Moore Township in Lambton County, Ontario and became a barrister by career.

Gray attended Sarnia Collegiate then Osgoode Hall Law School then attended Harvard University for post-graduate studies. He served with the Canadian Field Artillery from 1916 to 1919. From 1924 to 1927, he was a member of the Sarnia Board of Education.

He was first elected to Parliament at the Lambton West riding in a by-election on 14 January 1929 then re-elected there in 1930, 1935 and 1940. Gray was defeated by Joseph Warner Murphy of the Progressive Conservative party in the 1945 election.

By-election on 14 January 1929
Party	Candidate	Votes
Liberal	Ross Gray	acclaimed

1930 Canadian federal election: Lambton
Party	Candidate	Votes
Liberal	Ross Gray	7,868
Conservative	Wilfred Smith Haney	7,314

1935 Canadian federal election: Lambton
Party	Candidate	Votes
Liberal	Ross Gray	8,335
Conservative	Russell Gilbert Woods	4,636
Reconstruction	Frank James Miller	2,094

1940 Canadian federal election: Lambton
Party	Candidate	Votes
Liberal	Ross Gray	8,671
National Government	William Howard Kenny	7,864

1945 Canadian federal election: Lambton
Party	Candidate	Votes
Progressive Conservative	Joseph Warner Murphy	8,450
Liberal	Ross Gray	7,831
Co-operative Commonwealth	George H. Stirrett	2,560
