= Lorne Henderson =

Canadian politician

Ontario MPP
- In office 1967–1985
- Preceded by: New riding
- Succeeded by: David Smith
- Constituency: Lambton
- In office 1963–1967
- Preceded by: Charles Janes
- Succeeded by: Riding abolished
- Constituency: Lambton East

Personal details
- Born: October 31, 1920 Enniskillen, Ontario
- Died: February 7, 2002 (aged 81) Enniskillen, Ontario
- Party: Progressive Conservative Party
- Spouse: Reta Pearl
- Occupation: Farmer

Lorne Henderson (October 31, 1920 – February 7, 2002) was a politician in Ontario, Canada. He served in the Legislative Assembly of Ontario from 1963 to 1985, and was a cabinet minister in the government of William Davis. Henderson was a member of the Progressive Conservative Party.

== Background ==
He was born in Enniskillen, Ontario and received a grade eight education in the area. Henderson worked as a hog farmer before entering political life.

== Politics ==
He was a member of the Enniskillen council from 1946 to 1949, deputy reeve from 1950 to 1951, and reeve from 1952 to 1957. His career in municipal politics culminated when he was named Warden of Lambton County in 1957.

Henderson was elected to the Ontario legislature in the 1963 provincial election, defeating Liberal Party candidate Russell Watson by 874 votes in Lambton East. He served as a backbench supporter of John Robarts's government, and initially continued in this role when Davis succeeded Robarts as premier in 1971. He was re-elected with an increased majority in the elections of 1967 and 1971, and with a reduced majority in 1975.

He was appointed to cabinet on October 7, 1975 as a Minister without portfolio responsible for Housing, and was promoted to Chairman of Cabinet on February 3, 1977. Re-elected again in the 1977 election, he appointed as Minister of Government Services on January 21, 1978, and as Minister of Agriculture and Food on August 30, 1979. Henderson was most proud of his work in the Agriculture portfolio, although reviews from the farming community and his department staff were often less than flattering.

He was re-elected with a landslide majority in the 1981 election, and was named Provincial Secretary for Resource Development on February 13, 1982. He resigned from cabinet entirely on July 6, 1983. Henderson supported Frank Miller to succeed Davis as party leader in 1985, and did not campaign in that year's election.

Henderson was notorious for both his poor grammar and his ability to win government patronage. When the Charlotte Eleanor Englehart Petrolia Hospital in his constituency received a $160,000 donation in 1975, Henderson delivered it with the line, "Me and the premier brung you this cheque". He also possessed a remarkable ability to remember people's names after having only met them once and would often set-up appointments on Saturday afternoons with constituents.

=== Cabinet posts ===
Davis ministry, Province of Ontario (1971–1985)
Cabinet posts (6)
Predecessor	Office	Successor
Russ Ramsay	Provincial Secretary for Resource Development; 1982–1983	Norm Sterling
Bill Newman	Minister of Agriculture and Food; 1979–1982	Dennis Timbrell
George McCague	Minister of Government Services; 1978–1979	Douglas Wiseman
Special Cabinet Responsibilities
Predecessor	Title	Successor
Rene Brunelle	Chair of Cabinet; 1977–1979	George McCague
Sub-Cabinet Post
Predecessor	Title	Successor
	Minister without portfolio (1975–1977)	
