= Andrew Robinson McMillen =

Canadian politician from Ontario

Member of the Ontario Provincial Parliament for Lambton West
- In office September 30, 1929 – April 3, 1934
- Preceded by: Wilfred Smith Haney
- Succeeded by: William Guthrie

Personal details
- Party: Progressive Conservative

Andrew Robinson McMillen was a Canadian politician from the Progressive Conservative Party of Ontario. He represented Lambton West in the Legislative Assembly of Ontario from 1929 to 1934.

== See also ==
- 18th Parliament of Ontario
