= Lambton West (federal electoral district) =

Former federal electoral district in Ontario, Canada

Ontario electoral district

Defunct federal electoral district
- Legislature: House of Commons
- District created: 1882
- District abolished: 1966
- First contested: 1882
- Last contested: 1965

Lambton West was a federal electoral district represented in the House of Commons of Canada from 1883 to 1968. It was located in the province of Ontario. This riding was created from parts of Lambton riding.

The West Riding of the county of Lambton was initially defined to consist of the townships of Sarnia, Moore and Plympton, the town of Sarnia, and the villages of Wyoming, Forest and Point Edward.

== History ==
In 1903, the riding was redefined to include the townships of Dawn and Sombra, and exclude the town of Forest.

In 1924, Lambton West was defined to consist of that part of the county of Lambton included in the townships of Plympton, Sarnia, Moore and Sombra (including Walpole Island, St. Anne's Island and the other islands at the mouth of River St. Clair), and the city of Sarnia.

In 1933, the townships of Bosanquet was added, and the township of Sombra was excluded. In 1947, the village of Arkona was added.

In 1952, the village of Grand Bend was added.

In 1966, the electoral district was abolished when it was redistributed between Middlesex and Sarnia ridings.

== Members of Parliament ==
This riding elected the following members of the House of Commons of Canada:

Parliament	Years	Member	Party
Riding created from Lambton
5th	1882–1887	James Frederick Lister	Liberal
6th	1887–1891	James Frederick Lister	Liberal
7th	1891–1896	James Frederick Lister	Liberal
8th	1896–1898	James Frederick Lister	Liberal
8th	1898–1900	Thomas George Johnston	Liberal
9th	1900–1904	Thomas George Johnston	Liberal
10th	1904–1905†	Thomas George Johnston	Liberal
10th	1905–1908	Frederick Forsyth Pardee	Liberal
11th	1908–1911	Frederick Forsyth Pardee	Liberal
12th	1911–1917	Frederick Forsyth Pardee	Liberal
13th	1917–1921	Frederick Forsyth Pardee	Government (Unionist)
14th	1921–1925	Richard Vryling LeSueur	Conservative
15th	1925–1926	William Goodison	Liberal
16th	1926–1928†	William Goodison	Liberal
16th	1929–1930	Ross Gray	Liberal
17th	1930–1935	Ross Gray	Liberal
18th	1935–1940	Ross Gray	Liberal
19th	1940–1945	Ross Gray	Liberal
20th	1945–1949	Joseph Warner Murphy	Progressive Conservative
21st	1949–1953	Joseph Warner Murphy	Progressive Conservative
22nd	1953–1957	Joseph Warner Murphy	Progressive Conservative
23rd	1957–1958	Joseph Warner Murphy	Progressive Conservative
24th	1958–1962	Joseph Warner Murphy	Progressive Conservative
25th	1962–1963	Walter Frank Foy	Liberal
26th	1963–1965	Walter Frank Foy	Liberal
27th	1965–1968	Walter Frank Foy	Liberal
Riding dissolved into Sarnia and Middlesex

== Election results ==
1882 Canadian federal election
Party	Candidate	Votes
Liberal	James Frederick Lister	1,652
Unknown	A. C. Clark	1,311

1887 Canadian federal election
Party	Candidate	Votes
Liberal	James Frederick Lister	2,335
Conservative	William Henry McMahan	1,777

1891 Canadian federal election
Party	Candidate	Votes
Liberal	James Frederick Lister	2,364
Conservative	Frank Smith	1,766

1896 Canadian federal election
Party	Candidate	Votes
Liberal	James Frederick Lister	2,365
Protestant Protective	Cameron Dewar	1,208
Conservative	W. John Hanna	878

On Mr. Lister being appointed judge, 21 June 1898:

By-election on 14 December 1898
Party	Candidate	Votes
Liberal	Thomas George Johnston	2,365
Conservative	John Farrell	1,369

1900 Canadian federal election
Party	Candidate	Votes
Liberal	Thomas George Johnston	2,299
Conservative	W. J. Hanna	2,110

1904 Canadian federal election
Party	Candidate	Votes
Liberal	Thomas George Johnston	3,399
Conservative	James Clancy	2,952

On Mr. Johnston's death, 4 July 1905:

By-election on 22 November 1905
Party	Candidate	Votes
Liberal	Frederick Forsyth Pardee	2,848
Conservative	R. E. Le Sueur	2,602

1908 Canadian federal election
Party	Candidate	Votes
Liberal	Frederick Forsyth Pardee	3,205
Conservative	Richard Esnouf Le Sueur	3,059

1911 Canadian federal election
Party	Candidate	Votes
Liberal	Frederick Forsyth Pardee	3,139
Conservative	Richard Esnouf Le Sueur	3,050

1917 Canadian federal election
Party	Candidate	Votes
Government (Unionist)	Frederick Forsyth Pardee	5,691
Opposition (Laurier Liberals)	James Graham Merrison	2,842

1921 Canadian federal election
Party	Candidate	Votes
Conservative	Richard Vryling LeSueur	5,715
Progressive	Robert John White	4,958
Liberal	Frederick Forsyth Pardee	4,602

1925 Canadian federal election
Party	Candidate	Votes
Liberal	William Goodison	6,704
Conservative	Richard Vryling LeSueur	6,535

1926 Canadian federal election
Party	Candidate	Votes
Liberal	William Goodison	7,551
Conservative	Andrew R. McMillen	7,413

On Mr. Goodison's death, 3 December 1928:

By-election on 14 January 1929
Party	Candidate	Votes
Liberal	Ross Gray	acclaimed

1930 Canadian federal election
Party	Candidate	Votes
Liberal	Ross Gray	7,868
Conservative	Wilfred Smith Haney	7,314

1935 Canadian federal election
Party	Candidate	Votes
Liberal	Ross Gray	8,335
Conservative	Russell Gilbert Woods	4,636
Reconstruction	Frank James Miller	2,094

1940 Canadian federal election
Party	Candidate	Votes
Liberal	Ross Gray	8,671
National Government	William Howard Kenny	7,864

1945 Canadian federal election
Party	Candidate	Votes
Progressive Conservative	Joseph Warner Murphy	8,450
Liberal	Ross Gray	7,831
Co-operative Commonwealth	George H. Stirrett	2,560

1949 Canadian federal election
Party	Candidate	Votes
Progressive Conservative	Joseph Warner Murphy	9,730
Liberal	William Charles Nelson	8,962
Co-operative Commonwealth	James Welford Chaytor	2,014

1953 Canadian federal election
Party	Candidate	Votes
Progressive Conservative	Joseph Warner Murphy	11,666
Liberal	William Charles Nelson	9,306
Co-operative Commonwealth	Hugh Cragger Burtch	1,089

1957 Canadian federal election
Party	Candidate	Votes
Progressive Conservative	Joseph Warner Murphy	13,096
Liberal	John Stalker McEachran	11,583
Co-operative Commonwealth	Cecil Andrew Cunningham	1,732
Social Credit	Charles McAmmond Routley	827

1958 Canadian federal election
Party	Candidate	Votes
Progressive Conservative	Joseph Warner Murphy	16,603
Liberal	John Stalker McEachran	10,197
Co-operative Commonwealth	Cecil Andrew Cunningham	2,124
Independent	Charles Carleton Crossley	164

1962 Canadian federal election
Party	Candidate	Votes
Liberal	Walter Frank Foy	14,292
Progressive Conservative	Joseph Warner Murphy	11,292
New Democratic	James D. Kimmerly	6,249
Social Credit	Charles McAmmond Routley	524

1963 Canadian federal election
Party	Candidate	Votes
Liberal	Walter Frank Foy	15,978
Progressive Conservative	David Mackay Jackson	12,592
New Democratic	Jim Kimmerly	3,626
Social Credit	Larry Verheyden	264

1965 Canadian federal election
Party	Candidate	Votes
Liberal	Walter Frank Foy	12,805
Progressive Conservative	Richard W. Ford	12,230
New Democratic	Mark Abbott	7,346

== See also ==
- List of Canadian electoral districts
- Historical federal electoral districts of Canada
