= Lambton (provincial electoral district) =

Ontario electoral district

Defunct provincial electoral district
- Legislature: Legislative Assembly of Ontario
- District created: 1867
- District abolished: 1874
- District re-created: 1966
- District re-abolished: 1996
- First contested: 1867
- Last contested: 1995

Lambton was an electoral riding in Ontario, Canada. It was created in 1867 at the time of confederation. It was located in southwestern Ontario and included the town of Sarnia. In 1875 it was split into two separate ridings, Lambton East and Lambton West. Just before the 1967 election it was reconstituted largely as a rural constituency. Another riding, Sarnia was also created to represent the growing urban centre. In 1996, all provincial riding was reduced from 133 to 103 to be harmonized as their federal counterparts. A new riding called Sarnia—Lambton was formed and continues into the present day.

== Members of Provincial Parliament ==
Lambton
Assembly	Years	Member	Party
1st	1867–1871	Timothy Blair Pardee	Liberal
2nd	1871–1875	Timothy Blair Pardee	Liberal
Riding split into Lambton East and Lambton West
Lambton East and Lambton West redistributed into Lambton and Sarnia
28th	1967–1971	Lorne Henderson	Progressive Conservative
29th	1971–1975	Lorne Henderson	Progressive Conservative
30th	1975–1977	Lorne Henderson	Progressive Conservative
31st	1977–1981	Lorne Henderson	Progressive Conservative
32nd	1981–1985	Lorne Henderson	Progressive Conservative
33rd	1985–1987	David William Smith	Liberal
34th	1987–1990	David William Smith	Liberal
35th	1990–1995	Ellen MacKinnon	New Democratic
36th	1995–1999	Marcel Beaubien	Progressive Conservative
Sourced from the Ontario Legislative Assembly
Merged with Sarnia to form Sarnia-Lambton before the 1999 election

== Election results ==
=== 1967–1999 ===
1995 Ontario general election
Party	Candidate	Votes	%	±%
Progressive Conservative	Marcel Beaubien	12,034	43.58	+15.88
Liberal	Larry O'Neill	7,925	28.70	+2.35
New Democratic	Dona Stewardson	5,055	18.31	–13.10
Family Coalition	Jim Hopper	2,184	7.91	–4.94
Freedom	Wayne Forbes	417	1.51	–
Total valid votes		27,615	99.22	
Total rejected, unmarked and declined ballots		218	0.78	–0.18
Turnout		27,833	64.70	–3.47
Eligible voters		43,019		
Progressive Conservative gain from New Democratic		Swing		+14.49
Source: Elections Ontario

1990 Ontario general election
Party	Candidate	Votes	%	±%
New Democratic	Ellen MacKinnon	8,691	31.40	+19.99
Progressive Conservative	Bob Langstaff	7,665	27.70	–6.88
Liberal	David William Smith	7,291	26.35	–18.26
Family Coalition	Jim Hopper	3,557	12.85	+3.45
Confederation of Regions	Kim Beatson	471	1.70	–
Total valid votes		27,675	99.04	
Total rejected, unmarked and declined ballots		268	0.96	+0.59
Turnout		27,943	68.17	+1.54
Eligible voters		40,988		
New Democratic gain from Liberal		Swing		+19.13
Source: Elections Ontario

1987 Ontario general election
Party	Candidate	Votes	%	±%
Liberal	David William Smith	11,385	44.61	–2.92
Progressive Conservative	Bill Steadman	8,826	34.58	–9.17
New Democratic	Grant Reynolds	2,914	11.42	+2.69
Family Coalition	Peter Westfall	2,399	9.40	–
Total valid votes		25,524	99.63	
Total rejected ballots		94	0.37	–0.09
Turnout		25,618	66.63	–0.96
Eligible voters		38,448		
Liberal hold		Swing		+3.12
Source: Elections Ontario

1985 Ontario general election
Party	Candidate	Votes	%	±%
Liberal	David William Smith	10,816	47.52	+17.14
Progressive Conservative	Bob Boyd	9,956	43.75	–19.84
New Democratic	Grant Reynolds	1,987	8.73	+2.71
Total valid votes		22,759	99.54	
Total rejected ballots		105	0.46	+0.26
Turnout		22,864	67.59	+1.59
Eligible voters		33,826		
Liberal gain from Progressive Conservative		Swing		+18.49
Source: Elections Ontario

1981 Ontario general election
Party	Candidate	Votes	%	±%
Progressive Conservative	Lorne Henderson	13,467	63.59	+10.96
Liberal	Leigh Crozier	6,435	30.39	–9.26
New Democratic	Ralph N. Wensley	1,276	6.03	–1.69
Total valid votes		21,178	99.80	
Total rejected ballots		42	0.20	–0.01
Turnout		21,220	66.01	–4.40
Eligible voters		32,149		
Progressive Conservative hold		Swing		+10.11
Source: Elections Ontario

1977 Ontario general election
Party	Candidate	Votes	%	±%
Progressive Conservative	Lorne Henderson	11,604	52.63	+1.10
Liberal	Fred McCormick	8,741	39.65	–3.32
New Democratic	Cliff Swanstrom	1,702	7.72	+2.21
Total valid votes		22,047	99.80	
Total rejected ballots		45	0.20	–0.07
Turnout		22,092	70.40	–2.54
Eligible voters		31,379		
Progressive Conservative hold		Swing		+2.21
Source: Elections Ontario

1975 Ontario general election
Party	Candidate	Votes	%	±%
Progressive Conservative	Lorne Henderson	11,042	51.53	+0.83
Liberal	Fred McCormick	9,206	42.96	+11.04
New Democratic	Maurice R. Payne	1,180	5.51	–9.30
Total valid votes		21,428	99.73	
Total rejected ballots		59	0.27	–0.14
Turnout		21,487	72.94	–2.75
Eligible voters		29,457		
Progressive Conservative hold		Swing		–5.10
Source: Elections Ontario

1971 Ontario general election
Party	Candidate	Votes	%	±%
Progressive Conservative	Lorne Henderson	9,983	50.70	–3.59
Liberal	Fred McCormick	6,286	31.92	–7.17
New Democratic	Harry E. Wellington	2,915	14.80	+8.18
Independent	Donald M. Smith	507	2.57	–
Total valid votes		19,691	99.59	
Total rejected ballots		82	0.41	–0.47
Turnout		19,773	75.69	+6.07
Eligible voters		26,122		
Progressive Conservative hold		Swing		+1.79
Source: Elections Ontario

1967 Ontario general election
Party	Candidate	Votes	%
Progressive Conservative	Lorne Henderson	8,481	54.29
Liberal	Clarence W. Wilkinson	6,107	39.09
New Democratic	Arnold Bock	1,035	6.62
Total valid votes		15,623	99.12
Total rejected ballots		139	0.88
Turnout		15,762	69.62
Eligible voters		22,640	
Progressive Conservative pickup new district.			
Source: Elections Ontario

=== 1867–1875 ===
Ontario provincial by-election, November 13, 1872 Ministerial by-election
Party	Candidate	Votes
Liberal	Timothy Blair Pardee	Acclaimed
Source: History of the Electoral Districts, Legislatures and Ministries of the Province of Ontario

1871 Ontario general election
Party	Candidate	Votes
Liberal	Timothy Blair Pardee	Acclaimed
Source: Elections Ontario

1867 Ontario general election
Party	Candidate	Votes	%
Liberal	Timothy Blair Pardee	2,107	65.80
Conservative	Mr. Rae	1,095	34.20
Total valid votes		3,202	75.41
Eligible voters		4,246	
Liberal pickup new district.			
Source: Elections Ontario
