= Timothy Blair Pardee =

Canadian politician

Timothy Blair Pardee QC
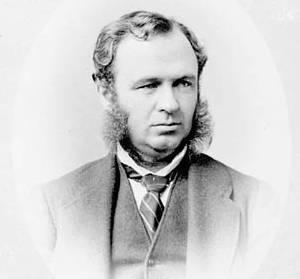

Ontario MPP
- In office 1875–1889
- Preceded by: Riding established
- Succeeded by: Alfred Thomas Gurd
- Constituency: Lambton West
- In office 1867–1874
- Preceded by: Riding established
- Succeeded by: Riding abolished
- Constituency: Lambton

Personal details
- Born: December 11, 1830 Grenville County, Upper Canada
- Died: July 21, 1889 (aged 58) Sarnia, Ontario
- Party: Liberal
- Relations: Frederick Forsyth, son
- Occupation: Lawyer

Timothy Blair Pardee, QC (December 11, 1830 – July 21, 1889) was an Ontario lawyer and political figure. He represented the riding of Lambton in the Legislative Assembly of Ontario from 1867 to 1874 and Lambton West from 1875 to 1889 as a Liberal.

He was born in Grenville County in Upper Canada in 1830. After his studies, he began articling in the law office of William Buell Richards, but, in 1849, he joined the California Gold Rush. A few years later, he headed off to the Victorian Gold Rush in Australia. Finally, he returned to Canada, articled in Sarnia and was called to the bar in 1861. He was appointed crown attorney in Lambton County but resigned in 1867 to run for a seat in the provincial parliament. In October 1872, he became provincial secretary in Oliver Mowat's cabinet. In December 1873, he was named Commissioner of Crown Lands. He became a Queen's Counsel in 1876. In 1878, he introduced an Act to Prevent the Forests from Destruction by Fire, the first forest protection legislation for the province. He resigned in January 1889 due to ill health.

He died in Sarnia later that year.

His son Frederick Forsyth later served in the Canadian House of Commons.

== Electoral history ==
1867 Ontario general election: Lambton
Party	Candidate	Votes	%
Liberal	Timothy Blair Pardee	2,107	65.80
Conservative	Mr. Rae	1,095	34.20
Total valid votes		3,202	75.41
Eligible voters		4,246	
Liberal pickup new district.			
Source: Elections Ontario

1871 Ontario general election: Lambton
Party	Candidate	Votes
Liberal	Timothy Blair Pardee	Acclaimed
Source: Elections Ontario

Ontario provincial by-election, November 13, 1872: Lambton Ministerial by-election
Party	Candidate	Votes
Liberal	Timothy Blair Pardee	Acclaimed
Source: History of the Electoral Districts, Legislatures and Ministries of the Province of Ontario

1875 Ontario general election: Lambton West
Party	Candidate	Votes	%
Liberal	Timothy Blair Pardee	1,372	64.53
Conservative	R.S. Chalmers	754	35.47
Turnout		2,126	57.23
Eligible voters		3,715	
Liberal pickup new district.			
Source: Elections Ontario

1879 Ontario general election: Lambton West
Party	Candidate	Votes	%	±%
Liberal	Timothy Blair Pardee	1,759	53.47	−11.07
Conservative	J.B. McGarvey	1,531	46.53	+11.07
Total valid votes		3,290	63.24	+6.02
Eligible voters		5,202		
Liberal hold		Swing		−11.07
Source: Elections Ontario
