= James Frederick Lister =

Canadian politician

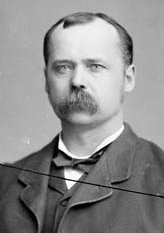

Member of the Canadian Parliament for Lambton West
- In office 1882–1896
- Preceded by: The electoral district was created in 1882.
- Succeeded by: Thomas George Johnston

Personal details
- Born: June 21, 1843 Belleville, Canada West
- Died: February 9, 1902 (aged 58) Toronto, Ontario, Canada
- Party: Liberal

James Frederick Lister (June 21, 1843 – February 9, 1902) was a Canadian lawyer, judge, and politician.

Born in Belleville, Canada West, Lister was educated at the Sarnia Grammar School. A lawyer, he practiced law in Sarnia, Ontario, and was a county solicitor from 1885 to 1898. He was created a Queen's Counsel by the Government of Ontario in 1890. He was first elected to the House of Commons of Canada for the electoral district of Lambton West in the 1882 federal election. A Liberal, he was re-elected in 1887, 1891, and 1896. In 1898, he was appointed as a Judge of the Court of Appeal.

He died in Toronto and was buried in Lakeview Cemetery in Sarnia.

1882 Canadian federal election: Lambton
Party	Candidate	Votes
Liberal	James Frederick Lister	1,652
Unknown	A. C. Clark	1,311

1887 Canadian federal election: Lambton
Party	Candidate	Votes
Liberal	James Frederick Lister	2,335
Conservative	William Henry McMahan	1,777

1891 Canadian federal election: Lambton
Party	Candidate	Votes
Liberal	James Frederick Lister	2,364
Conservative	Frank Smith	1,766

1896 Canadian federal election: Lambton
Party	Candidate	Votes
Liberal	James Frederick Lister	2,365
Protestant Protective	Cameron Dewar	1,208
Conservative	W. John Hanna	878
