= Alfred Thomas Gurd =

Canadian politician

Alfred Gurd

Ontario MPP
- In office 1894–1898
- Preceded by: Charles MacKenzie
- Succeeded by: Frederick Forsyth Pardee
- Constituency: Lambton West

Personal details
- Born: March 30, 1846 Moore Township, Lambton County, Canada West
- Died: August 15, 1919 (aged 73) St. Clair, Michigan
- Party: Protestant Protective Association
- Spouse: Dell Shaw (m. 1879)
- Occupation: Farmer

Alfred Thomas Gurd (March 30, 1846 – August 15, 1919) was an Ontario farmer, entrepreneur and political figure. He represented Lambton West in the Legislative Assembly of Ontario from 1894 to 1898 as a Conservative-Protestant Protective Association member.

He was born in Moore Township, Lambton County in 1846, the son of William Gurd, an Irish immigrant, and was educated in Sarnia. He was an oil producer and also manufactured explosives. In 1879, he married Dell Shaw. Gurd was mayor of Petrolia in 1890, 1891 and 1894. He defeated Charles MacKenzie in the 1894 provincial election. Gurd was a master in the Masonic Order. In 1902, he drilled in Raleigh Township, producing the so-called "Gurd gusher". In 1910, Gurd moved to Tulsa, Oklahoma, where he continued to be involved in the oil industry.
