= Ellen MacKinnon =

Canadian politician

Ontario MPP
- In office 1990–1995
- Preceded by: David Smith
- Succeeded by: Marcel Beaubien
- Constituency: Lambton

Personal details
- Born: April 27, 1926 farm near Sarnia, Ontario
- Died: February 10, 2001 (aged 74)
- Party: New Democrat
- Spouse: William
- Children: 7
- Occupation: Farmer

Ellen MacKinnon (April 27, 1926 – February 12, 2001) was a politician in Ontario, Canada. She was a New Democratic member of the Legislative Assembly of Ontario in the southwest Ontario riding of Lambton from 1990 to 1995.

== Background ==
MacKinnon was born near Sarnia, Ontario to a farming family. Due to the depression she was forced to quit school after Grade 8. She worked as waitress, house servant and in a factory during World War II. She was married near the end of the war and she moved to a farm in Lambton County. She raised seven children, two daughters and five sons while tending the farm while her husband was away working for a Sarnia oil company. Her husband died in 1980.

== Politics ==
She was a county councillor for the township of Plympton from 1977 to 1979 and served as a school trustee on the Lambton County public school board from 1988 to 1990.

MacKinnon ran as the New Democratic candidate in the provincial election of 1990 in the south-western Ontario riding of Lambton. During the campaign, MacKinnon spoke out against shipping Toronto area garbage to the Sarnia region. She said, "No garbage. Not here. Not now. Not ever." MacKinnon learned later that many voters appreciated her simple answer to a complex issue. She defeated Progressive Conservative candidate Bob Langstaff by 1,024 votes. The incumbent Liberal David Smith placed third.

MacKinnon was 64 at the time of her win and was the oldest member of the NDP caucus. When she arrived at Queen's Park after the election she was awe-struck by the experience. She said, "I'm wondering what I'll do for an apartment, what you do for furniture and how many clothes do I bring here, and how many do I leave at home." The NDP won a majority government in this election and she served as a backbench supporter of Bob Rae's administration for the next five years.

In 1992, she suffered a tragic loss when one of her daughter's died due to cancer.

In 1994, she voted for the party's bill on benefits for same-sex couples despite receiving death threats. Someone parked a wagon near her constituency office in Petrolia, Ontario with a sign on it that read, "Hey Ellen, it's Adam and Eve, not Adam and Steve." MacKinnon said, "I think that it's a very, very poor reflection on (a) beautiful community." The bill was eventually defeated 68-59 on a free vote.

Due to health reasons, she did not seek re-election in 1995.

== Death ==
MacKinnon died February 12, 2001. On April 23 of that year, the Ontario legislature paid her an official tribute. NDP leader Howard Hampton spoke about her and quoted William Irvine:

"I will not acquiesce to that which is. If it must be, I meet it with rebellion. With passion, love and life destroyed, my soul shall stand upon the wreck and challenge all."

Hampton said, "I think that describes Ellen MacKinnon to a T."
