= William Goodison (surgeon) =

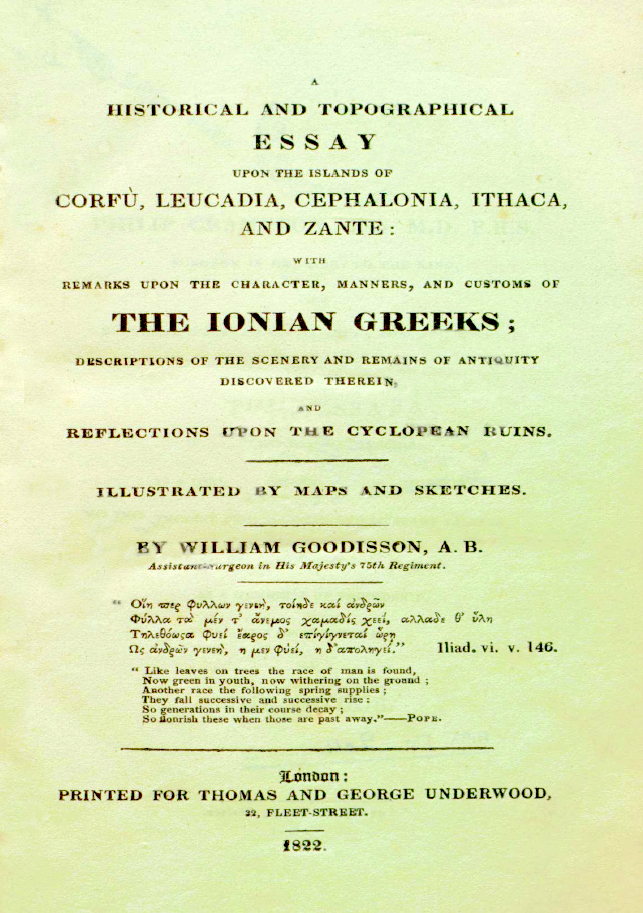
The title page of the book about the Ionian Islands by William Goodison

William Goodison (alternatively Goodisson) (Note: It is difficult to support which of the two forms of his surname (Goodison or Goodisson) is the proper one. The double ss form (Goodisson) could be considered the right one, as it is commonly used in Ireland and it was chosen by William Goodison himself for his publication about the Ionian Islands, in 1822 (see Goodisson W., 1822 below), but in all the annual lists of the British army officers, from 1811 to 1838 inclusive, his surname is enlisted and written with one s (Goodison). The latter form appeared in his article on the Remittent Fever and the Plague in Corfu (see Goodison W., 1817 below). In this entry we use the official form of his surname, as listed in the archives of the British Army.) (1785–1836) was an assistant surgeon of the British Army. He was born in 1785 in the county of Wicklow, Ireland. His father, William Goodison, was a pharmacist and urged his son to study under professor Austin of Trinity College, Dublin. William Goodison entered Trinity College at the age of 16, in 1801, and concluded his studies in the spring of 1807 by obtaining a B.A. (Bachelor of Arts). He ranked the Medical Service of the British Army on 23 August 1810. He was placed an assistant surgeon of the 75th Regiment of Foot (also known as the Abercromby or the Highland Regiment), a position previously held by John Cumine. He served this post until 4 March 1824, when he was reduced on half-pay and moved to the 25th Regiment of Light Dragoons, until his death in August 1836.

The 75th Regiment of Foot was posted, during the Napoleonic Wars, to the Ionian Islands and arrived in Corfu on 14 July 1814, after the de facto occupation of the island by the British. William Goodison, then a young assistant surgeon under George Treyer, served in Melikia, a village near Lefkimmi in southern Corfu-island, and studied, on the field, the symptoms of the remittent fever and the plague which struck the region. The epidemic had appeared in Malta in 1814 and was transferred to the Ionian Islands in 1815 and 1816. Goodison published the results of his observations in an article, which appeared in the medical periodical Dublin Hospital Reports in 1817.

After the elimination of the plague epidemic in Corfu, the 75th Regiment of Foot moved, in August 1817, to the island of Lefkas, where it stayed until the end of 1820. From Lefkas, Goodison travelled to other Ionian islands, like Meganisi, Ithaca, Cephalonia and Zante. The Regiment returned to Corfu on the last days of 1820, and stayed there until August 1821. Their next base was Gibraltar from where they returned to England at the end of 1823.

During his service in Corfu and the Ionian Islands, Goodison took advantage of his stay there and compared the topography of these islands against the descriptions of Homer's Odyssey and other texts of ancient and modern writers. The outcome was a Historical and Topographical Essay upon the Islands of Corfù, Leucadia, Cephalonia, Ithaca, and Zante: with Remarks upon the Character, Manners, and Customs of the Ionian Greeks, which he composed during his stay in the islands and concluded writing in Gibraltar, where the regiment moved in August 1821. The book was published in October 1822, in London, by Thomas and George Underwood, and was welcomed with extensive reviews, published in the following years.
