= Richard Vryling LeSueur =

Canadian politician

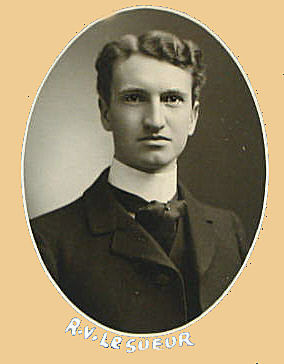
- Graduation photo from Osgoode Law School

Member of Parliament for Lambton West
- In office December 1921 – September 1925
- Preceded by: Frederick Forsyth Pardee
- Succeeded by: William Goodison

Personal details
- Born: Richard Vryling LeSueur; 28 January 1879 Sarnia, Ontario
- Died: 6 September 1945 (aged 66)
- Party: Conservative
- Profession: barrister

Richard Vryling LeSueur (28 January 1879 – 6 September 1945) was a Conservative member of the House of Commons of Canada. He was born in Sarnia, Ontario and became a barrister.

He was elected to Parliament at the Lambton West riding in the 1921 general election. After serving his only federal term, the 14th Canadian Parliament, LeSueur was defeated in the 1925 election by William Goodison of the Liberals.

1921 Canadian federal election: Lambton
| Party | Candidate | Votes |
|---|---|---|
| Conservative | Richard Vryling LeSueur | 5,715 |
| Progressive | Robert John White | 4,958 |
| Liberal | Frederick Forsyth Pardee | 4,602 |

1925 Canadian federal election: Lambton
| Party | Candidate | Votes |
|---|---|---|
| Liberal | William Goodison | 6,704 |
| Conservative | Richard Vryling LeSueur | 6,535 |
