= Joseph Warner Murphy =

Canadian politician

Member of Parliament for Lambton West
- In office June 1945 – June 1962
- Preceded by: Ross Wilfred Gray
- Succeeded by: Walter Frank Foy

Personal details
- Born: 21 December 1892 Kent County, Ontario, Canada
- Died: 3 July 1977 (aged 84)
- Party: Progressive Conservative
- Profession: farmer, lawyer

Joseph Warner Murphy (21 December 1892 – 3 July 1977) was a Progressive Conservative party member of the House of Commons of Canada. He was born in Kent County, Ontario and became a farmer and lawyer by career.

He was first elected at the Lambton West riding in the 1945 general election and served for five successive terms in Parliament until he was defeated in the 1962 federal election by Walter Frank Foy of the Liberal Party.

1945 Canadian federal election: Lambton
Party	Candidate	Votes
Progressive Conservative	Joseph Warner Murphy	8,450
Liberal	Ross Gray	7,831
Co-operative Commonwealth	George H. Stirrett	2,560

1949 Canadian federal election: Lambton
Party	Candidate	Votes
Progressive Conservative	Joseph Warner Murphy	9,730
Liberal	William Charles Nelson	8,962
Co-operative Commonwealth	James Welford Chaytor	2,014

1953 Canadian federal election: Lambton
Party	Candidate	Votes
Progressive Conservative	Joseph Warner Murphy	11,666
Liberal	William Charles Nelson	9,306
Co-operative Commonwealth	Hugh Cragger Burtch	1,089

1957 Canadian federal election: Lambton
Party	Candidate	Votes
Progressive Conservative	Joseph Warner Murphy	13,096
Liberal	John Stalker McEachran	11,583
Co-operative Commonwealth	Cecil Andrew Cunningham	1,732
Social Credit	Charles McAmmond Routley	827

1958 Canadian federal election: Lambton
Party	Candidate	Votes
Progressive Conservative	Joseph Warner Murphy	16,603
Liberal	John Stalker McEachran	10,197
Co-operative Commonwealth	Cecil Andrew Cunningham	2,124
Independent	Charles Carleton Crossley	164

1962 Canadian federal election: Lambton
Party	Candidate	Votes
Liberal	Walter Frank Foy	14,292
Progressive Conservative	Joseph Warner Murphy	11,292
New Democratic	James D. Kimmerly	6,249
Social Credit	Charles McAmmond Routley	524
