= Thomas George Johnston =

Canadian politician

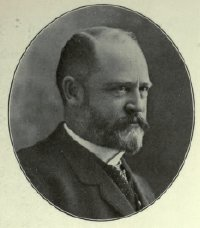

Member of the Canadian Parliament for Lambton West
- In office 1898–1905
- Preceded by: James Frederick Lister
- Succeeded by: Frederick Forsyth Pardee

Personal details
- Born: August 4, 1849 Sarnia, Canada West
- Died: July 4, 1905 (aged 55)
- Party: Liberal

Thomas George Johnston (August 4, 1849 – July 4, 1905) was a Canadian physician and politician.

Born in Sarnia, Canada West, was educated at the public and grammar schools of Sarnia. He graduated in medicine from McGill College and took up his father's practice in Sarnia. He was Mayor of Sarnia for two terms (1896 and 1897) and Chairman of the Board of Health and a School Trustee. He was first elected to the House of Commons of Canada for Lambton West in an 1898 by-election. A Liberal, he was re-elected in 1900 and 1904. He served in the Canadian militia and participated in the Fenian raids between 1866 and 1871. He died in office in 1905.

By-election on 14 December 1898
Party	Candidate	Votes
Liberal	Thomas George Johnston	2,365
Conservative	John Farrell	1,369

1900 Canadian federal election: Lambton
Party	Candidate	Votes
Liberal	Thomas George Johnston	2,299
Conservative	W. J. Hanna	2,110

1904 Canadian federal election: Lambton
Party	Candidate	Votes
Liberal	Thomas George Johnston	3,399
Conservative	James Clancy	2,952

Political offices
Preceded by J.G. Merrison	Mayor of Sarnia, Ontario; 1896 – 1897	Succeeded by F.C. Watson
