= William Goodison (politician) =

Canadian politician

William T. Goodison

Member of Parliament for Lambton West
- In office October 1925 – December 1928
- Preceded by: Richard Vryling Lesueur
- Succeeded by: Ross Wilfred Gray

Personal details
- Born: William Thomas Goodison; 16 February 1876 Strathroy, Ontario
- Died: 3 December 1928 (aged 52) Cleveland, Ohio, United States
- Party: Liberal
- Spouse(s): Ida M. Johns m. 4 November 1903
- Profession: business executive, business manager, manufacturer

William Thomas Goodison (16 February 1876 – 3 December 1928) was a Liberal party member of the House of Commons of Canada. He was born in Strathroy, Ontario and became a business executive, business manager and manufacturer.

Goodison attended schools at Strathroy and Sarnia Collegiate before further studies at Osgoode Hall Law School. He became president and manager of the John Goodison Thresher Company Ltd. and president of the Sarnia-based Industrial Mortgage and Savings Company. He served as directory of the Ontario Commercial Travellers Association and in 1925 and 1926 was chair of the Sarnia Board of Education.

He was first elected to Parliament at the Lambton West riding in the 1925 general election then re-elected there in the 1926 election.

In late 1928, during his term in the 16th Canadian Parliament, Goodison underwent surgery at a hospital in Cleveland, Ohio. The operation was unsuccessful and he remained unconscious for ten days, dying there on the evening of 3 December 1928. Goodison left his widow and immediate family a $377,000 (CA$) estate.

1925 Canadian federal election: Lambton
Party	Candidate	Votes
Liberal	William Goodison	6,704
Conservative	Richard Vryling LeSueur	6,535

1926 Canadian federal election: Lambton
Party	Candidate	Votes
Liberal	William Goodison	7,551
Conservative	Andrew R. McMillen	7,413
