= Ralph Knox (politician) =

Canadian politician (1905–1981)

Ontario MPP
- In office 1963–1967
- Preceded by: Bryan Cathcart
- Succeeded by: Riding abolished
- Constituency: Lambton West

Personal details
- Born: January 1, 1905 Asphodel Township, Ontario
- Died: March 24, 1981 (aged 76) Lambton County, Ontario
- Party: Progressive Conservative
- Spouse: Eva Lillian
- Occupation: Teacher

John Ralph Knox (January 1, 1905 – March 24, 1981) was a politician in Ontario, Canada. He was a Progressive Conservative member of the Legislative Assembly of Ontario from 1963 to 1967 who represented the southwestern riding of Lambton West.

== Background ==
Knox was born in Asphodel Township, Ontario. He was a teacher in the Lambton County public school system and, from 1952 to the time of his election, in 1963, he was the Principal of Devine Street Public School in Sarnia. He died in 1981. He married his wife, Eva Lillian Knox, on 24 September 1928 and he is buried, with his wife, at Lakeview Cemetery, Lambton County, Ontario.

== Politics ==
Knox was elected to Sarnia city council in the late 1950s and served for eight years. In the 1963 provincial election, he ran as the Knox served as the Progressive Conservative candidate in the riding of Lambton West. He defeated Liberal candidate William Rogers by 638 votes. He served as a backbench supporter government led by Premier John Robarts. In the 1967 election he ran in the newly redistributed riding of Sarnia but was defeated by Liberal Jim Bullbrook by 1,092 votes.
