= Harry Steel (politician) =

Canadian politician

Ontario MPP
- In office 1943–1945
- Preceded by: William Guthrie
- Succeeded by: Bryan Cathcart
- Constituency: Lambton West

Personal details
- Born: June 11, 1879 Stratford, Ontario
- Died: January 29, 1962 (aged 82) Sarnia, Ontario
- Party: CCF
- Spouse: Elizabeth Forbes (m. 1919)
- Occupation: Machinist

Henry Steel (June 11, 1879 – January 29, 1962) was a machinist and political figure in Ontario. He represented Lambton West in the Legislative Assembly of Ontario from 1943 to 1945 as a Co-operative Commonwealth member.

He was born in Stratford, Ontario in 1879, the son of Henry Edwin Steel and Hannah Bissett, and was educated in Point Edward and Sarnia. In 1919, Steel married Elizabeth Forbes. He was a Sarnia alderman from 1921 to 1932. He died there in 1962 and was interred at Lakeview Cemetery.
