= David William Smith =

Canadian politician

David Smith

Ontario MPP
- In office 1985–1990
- Preceded by: Lorne Henderson
- Succeeded by: Ellen MacKinnon
- Constituency: Lambton

Personal details
- Born: December 30, 1938 (age 87) Sarnia, Ontario, Canada
- Party: Liberal
- Occupation: Farmer

David William Smith (born December 30, 1938) is a former politician in Ontario, Canada. He was a Liberal member of the Legislative Assembly of Ontario from 1985 to 1990 representing the southwestern riding of Lambton.

== Background ==
Smith was educated at Ridgetown Agricultural School, and worked as a farmer before entering political life.

== Politics ==
He served as reeve of Plympton Township, and was Warden of Lambton County in 1983.

He was elected to the Ontario legislature in the 1985 provincial election. He defeated Progressive Conservative candidate Bob Boyd by 860 votes in the southwestern riding of Lambton. He was re-elected with an increased majority in the 1987 election. During his time in the legislature, Smith served as a backbench supporter of David Peterson's government.

Shortly after his election in 1985, Smith was appointed to a committee to study funding for Roman Catholic schools. During one session in July 1985, he made some controversial remarks where he appeared to support some of the views of holocaust denier James Keegstra. After the meeting he told reporters that he did not know whether Keegstra was right or wrong in denying the mass murder of Jews during the Second World War. He later resigned from the committee. David Peterson distanced himself from the comments in a letter to the Canadian Jewish Congress in which he called Smith's remarks unconscionable. Roger Pazey, a rabbi in Sarnia said that Smith's remarks were naive. Pazey said, "[Smith] is a little naive and doesn't really know much about the general background of the Jewish people." Smith later recanted his remarks.

The Liberals were defeated by the New Democratic Party in the 1990 provincial election, and Smith finished third against NDP candidate Ellen MacKinnon in his bid for re-election.
