= Frederick Forsyth Pardee =

Canadian politician

The Honourable Frederick Forsyth Pardee KC
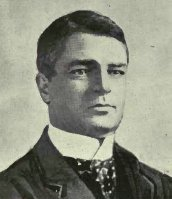

Canadian Senator from Ontario
- In office 1922–1927
- Nominated by: William Lyon Mackenzie King
- Appointed by: Julian Byng

Member of Parliament for Lambton West
- In office 1905–1921
- Preceded by: Thomas George Johnston
- Succeeded by: Richard Vryling Lesueur

Ontario MPP
- In office 1898–1902
- Preceded by: Alfred Thomas Gurd
- Succeeded by: William John Hanna
- Constituency: Lambton West

Personal details
- Born: 29 December 1866 Sarnia, Canada West
- Died: 4 February 1927 (aged 60) Ottawa, Ontario, Canada
- Party: Liberal
- Spouse: Mary E. Johnston (m. 1891)

Frederick Forsyth Pardee, KC (29 December 1866 – 4 February 1927) was an Ontario barrister and political figure. He represented Lambton West in the Legislative Assembly of Ontario from 1898 to 1902 as a Liberal member and in the House of Commons of Canada from 1905 to 1918 as a Liberal member and from 1918 to 1921 as a member of the Unionist Party. He was a member of the Senate of Canada from 1922 to 1927.

== Background ==
He was born in Sarnia, Ontario in 1866, the son of Timothy Blair Pardee. He was educated at Upper Canada College, studied law and was called to the bar in 1890. He was named King's Counsel in 1908. In 1891, he married Mary E. Johnston. Pardee was elected to the House of Commons in a 1905 by-election held after the death of Thomas George Johnston. He was chief government whip from 1909 from 1911 and chief opposition whip in 1912. He ran unsuccessfully for a seat in the federal parliament as a Liberal in 1921. Pardee was named to the Senate later that year and served until his death in 1927.

== Electoral record ==
By-election on 22 November 1905
Party	Candidate	Votes
Liberal	Frederick Forsyth Pardee	2,848
Conservative	R. E. Le Sueur	2,602

1908 Canadian federal election: Lambton
Party	Candidate	Votes
Liberal	Frederick Forsyth Pardee	3,205
Conservative	Richard Esnouf Le Sueur	3,059

1911 Canadian federal election: Lambton
Party	Candidate	Votes
Liberal	Frederick Forsyth Pardee	3,139
Conservative	Richard Esnouf Le Sueur	3,050

1917 Canadian federal election: Lambton
Party	Candidate	Votes
Government (Unionist)	Frederick Forsyth Pardee	5,691
Opposition (Laurier Liberals)	James Graham Merrison	2,842

1921 Canadian federal election: Lambton
Party	Candidate	Votes
Conservative	Richard Vryling LeSueur	5,715
Progressive	Robert John White	4,958
Liberal	Frederick Forsyth Pardee	4,602
