= Jordan Hill (ice hockey) =

Canadian ice hockey player

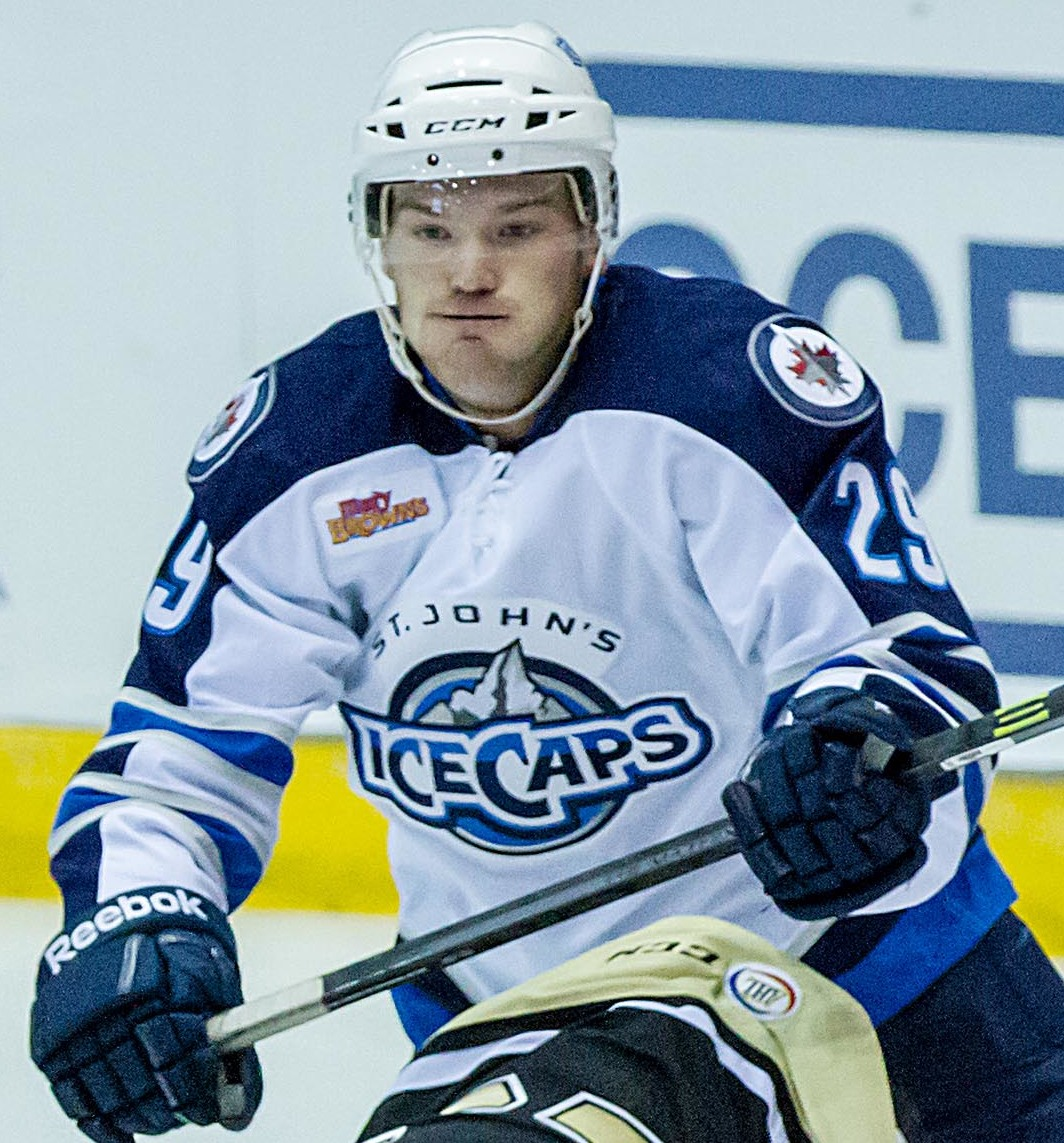
- Hill with the St. John's IceCaps in 2014
- Born: March 8, 1989 (age 36) Sarnia, Ontario, Canada
- Height: 6 ft 2 in (188 cm)
- Weight: 205 lb (93 kg; 14 st 9 lb)
- Position: Defence
- Shot: Left
- Played for: Manitoba Moose; Manchester Monarchs; Bridgeport Sound Tigers; St. John's IceCaps
- NHL draft: Undrafted
- Playing career: 2010–2017

Jordan Hill (born March 8, 1989) is a Canadian former professional ice hockey defenceman. He last played with the Toledo Walleye in the ECHL.

== Playing career ==
Hill played major junior hockey in the Ontario Hockey League with the Sarnia Sting and Saginaw Spirit. He began his professional career with the 2009–10 season where he played two games in the American Hockey League with the Manitoba Moose.

On October 29, 2012, Hill was called up from the ECHL's Ontario Reign to join the AHL's Bridgeport Sound Tigers, and on November 28, 2012, Hill signed on to play with the Bridgeport team for the remainder of the 2012–13 season.

Hill was invited to attend the St. John's IceCaps training camp for the 2013–14 season. On the eve of the opening night, he was signed to a one-year AHL contract with the IceCaps on October 5, 2013.

After two seasons with the IceCaps, and unable to secure an AHL contract, Hill returned to the ECHL in signing a one-year deal with the Norfolk Admirals on August 20, 2015.

As a free agent on August 5, 2016, Hill continued in the ECHL, signing a one-year deal with the Toledo Walleye. Following the 2016–17 season, Hill announced his retirement from professional hockey due to a lingering hip injury on September 4, 2017.

== Career statistics ==
			Regular season					Playoffs
Season	Team	League	GP	G	A	Pts	PIM	GP	G	A	Pts	PIM
2006–07	Sarnia Blast	WOHL	17	1	0	1	18	—	—	—	—	—
2007–08	Sarnia Sting	OHL	65	2	3	5	49	7	0	0	0	4
2008–09	Sarnia Sting	OHL	67	7	15	22	49	5	0	0	0	4
2009–10	Sarnia Sting	OHL	41	4	15	19	55	—	—	—	—	—
2009–10	Saginaw Spirit	OHL	28	3	16	19	18	6	2	1	3	4
2009–10	Manitoba Moose	AHL	2	0	0	0	2	—	—	—	—	—
2010–11	Ontario Reign	ECHL	28	3	6	9	26	—	—	—	—	—
2010–11	Manchester Monarchs	AHL	17	1	1	2	29	2	0	1	1	0
2011–12	Manchester Monarchs	AHL	41	1	2	3	35	1	0	0	0	2
2012–13	Ontario Reign	ECHL	6	0	1	1	9	—	—	—	—	—
2012–13	Bridgeport Sound Tigers	AHL	33	5	7	12	44	—	—	—	—	—
2013–14	St. John's IceCaps	AHL	68	0	12	12	54	18	2	1	3	7
2014–15	St. John's IceCaps	AHL	36	1	3	4	27	—	—	—	—	—
2015–16	Norfolk Admirals	ECHL	66	4	22	26	24	—	—	—	—	—
2015–16	Manitoba Moose	AHL	8	0	0	0	6	—	—	—	—	—
2016–17	Toledo Walleye	ECHL	41	3	11	14	27	17	0	1	1	15
2016–17	Manitoba Moose	AHL	6	0	0	0	0	—	—	—	—	—
AHL totals			211	8	25	33	197	21	2	2	4	9
ECHL totals			141	10	40	50	86	17	0	1	1	15
