= Wilfred Smith Haney =

Canadian politician

Ontario MPP
- In office 1923–1929
- Preceded by: Jonah Moorehouse Webster
- Succeeded by: Andrew Robinson McMillen
- Constituency: Lambton West

Personal details
- Born: 3 January 1899 Sarnia, Ontario
- Died: 16 December 1947 (aged 48) London, Ontario
- Party: Conservative
- Spouse: Joan Cheney (m. 1922)
- Occupation: Lawyer

Wilfred Smith Haney (3 January 1899 – 16 December 1947) was an Ontario barrister and political figure. He represented Lambton West in the Legislative Assembly of Ontario from 1923 to 1929 as a Conservative member.

He was born in Sarnia, Ontario, in 1899, the son of William Henry Haney, and educated in Sarnia and at Osgoode Hall. Haney served overseas with the Royal Naval Air Service during World War I. In 1922, he married Joan Cheney. He was a member of the Sarnia Board of Education. Haney ran unsuccessfully for a seat in the House of Commons in 1930. He died of an illness of three weeks in 1947.
