= Derek Sullivan (artist) =

Canadian artist (born 1976)

Derek Sullivan (born 1976) is a contemporary visual artist from Toronto, Ontario. Sullivan’s multidisciplinary practice employs drawing, sculpture, book works, and installation to engage with the legacy of modernist art and design. He is currently an Assistant Professor in Sculpture/Installation at OCAD University.

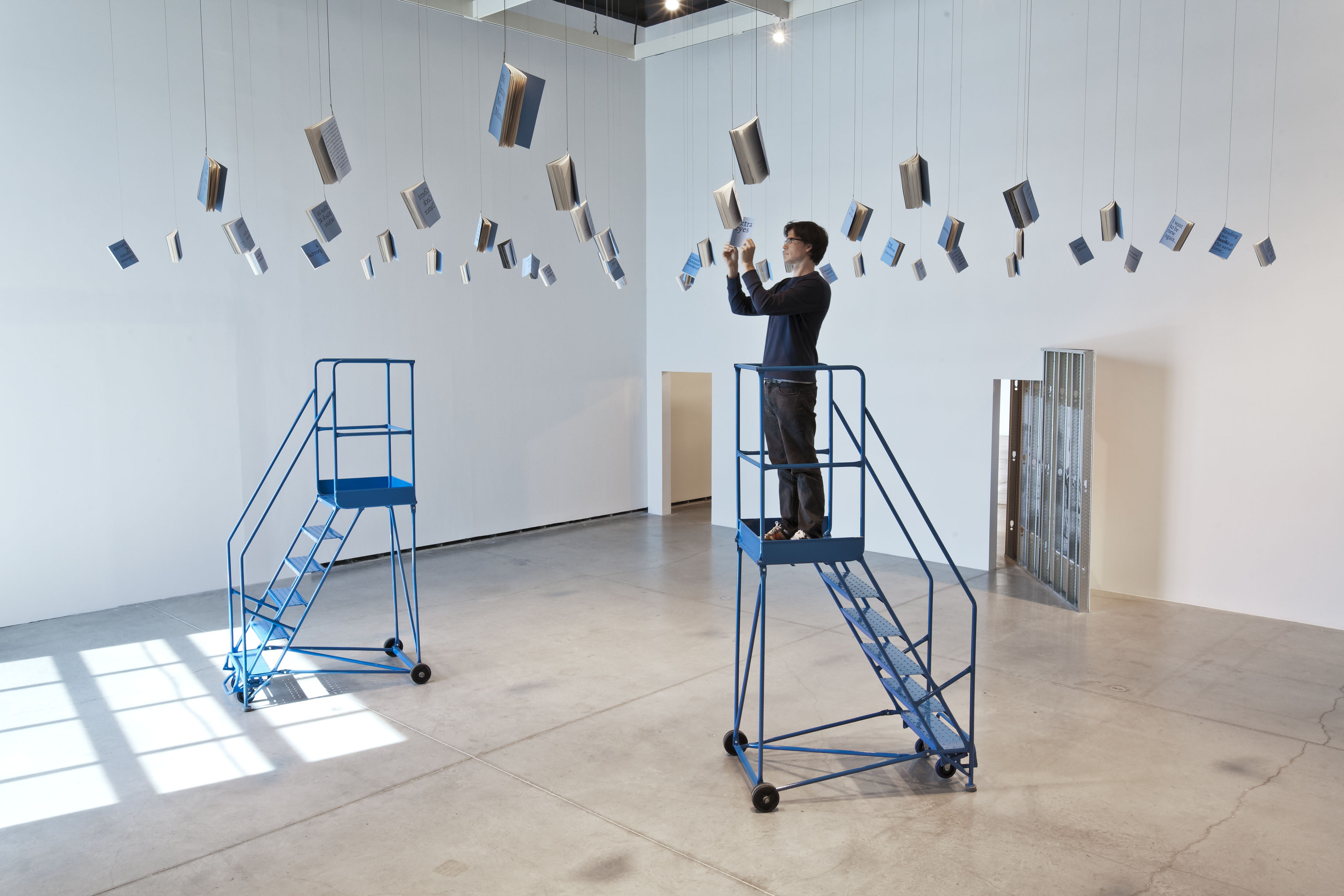
Derek Sullivan, Albatross Omnibus (installation view) 2011, The Power Plant Contemporary Art Gallery, Toronto

== Art Practice ==
Sullivan's art practice is characterized by its interdisciplinarity. Of the artist, Canadian Art Magazine writes, "employs drawing, painting, sculpture, book works and installation to question familiar forms and genres, often to examine the links between one discipline and the next." Books and the act of reading have consistently been central to Sullivan's practice. This interest was apparent in the 2011 exhibition Albatross Omnibus at The Power Plant; where Sullivan hung 52 limited-edition books from one of the gallery's ceilings; and within his limited edition publication, Lynn Valley 8, a series of 40 books co-produced by Bywater Bros. Editions and Presentation House Gallery in 2013 which are only two of the seventy plus Artists Publications Sullivan has produced.

== Education ==
Sullivan graduated from York University with a BFA (1998). He earned his MFA from University of Guelph (2002).

== Exhibitions ==
Sullivan has been the subject of several solo exhibitions including, The Missing Novella at Oakville Galleries in 2015; the 2011 exhibition Albatross Omnibus at The Power Plant;We May be Standing on the Shoulders of Giants but Some of us are Looking at the Stars in 2008 at the Southern Alberta Art Gallery in Lethbridge Alberta; and in 2005 he presented KIOSK 2005 at the Toronto Sculpture Garden. He has been included in numerous group exhibitions including at the Museum of Contemporary Canadian Art, Toronto; National Gallery of Canada, Ottawa; Contemporary Art Gallery (Vancouver); Casino Luxembourg; Mercer Union, Toronto; Australian Centre for Contemporary Art, Melbourne; and the Swiss Institute, New York.

== Awards and recognition ==
In 2012, Sullivan was a shortlisted for the Sobey Art Award, Canada's largest award for young artists. He was also nominated for the award in 2009, 2011, and 2015.

== Collections ==
- Agnes Etherington Art Centre, Kingston
- Art Gallery of York University, Toronto
- Bibliothèque Kandinsky, Centre Pompidou, Paris
- Bibliothèque de France, Paris (France)
- CDLA, Saint-Yrieix-la-Perche (France)
- Getty Museum Archives and Library, Los Angeles
- MacDonald-Stewart Art Centre, Guelph
- Library & Archives of the National Gallery of Canada, Ottawa
- McCarthy-Tétrault, Toronto
- National Gallery of Canada, Ottawa
- Perimeter Institute, Waterloo
- University of Waterloo Art Gallery, Waterloo
- Royal Bank of Canada Collection, Toronto
- Bank of Montreal Collection, Toronto
- TD Canada Trust Bank Group Collection, Toronto
- Private collections (Canada, USA, France, Belgium, Spain)
