= Brian Groombridge =

Canadian artist (born 1953)

Brian Groombridge (born December 18, 1953) is a Canadian visual artist. He currently lives and works in Toronto, Ontario.

== Biography ==
Groombridge was born in Sarnia, Ontario in 1953. He attended Sheridan College in 1972, and continued at the Ontario College of Art (O.C.A., now OCAD University) from 1974 to 1978. In 1977 he became part of O.C.A.'s New York Off-Campus Study Program. Groombridge works in various media including screen-print, letterpress and sculpture. His work has been presented across Canada and abroad at venues including Het Apollohuis, Eindhoven, Netherlands; Cold City Gallery, Toronto; Contemporary Art Gallery, Vancouver; Art Gallery of Ontario, Toronto; National Gallery of Canada, Ottawa; Art Gallery of Nova Scotia, Halifax; Plug In ICA, Winnipeg; and The Power Plant, Toronto. His work has been collected by various public institutions including Art Gallery of Hamilton; Art Gallery of Nova Scotia; Art Gallery of Ontario; Museum London; National Gallery of Canada; Vancouver Art Gallery; and numerous private collections.

== Art Practice ==
Brian Groombridge's internationally exhibited work is characterized by a reductive, minimalist style with subject matter inspired by historical sources such as facts, data and measurements that usually pertain to the art world. As Jen Hutton writes in her 2013 essay Galileo's Finger, "[Groombridge's] sculptures, installations, and wall works employ a strict rationality: hard edges, cool metals, and bright, smooth finishes. If there is decoration, it is austere. If there is text, it is extremely concise or merely a label." Groombridge's work often refers to the transient nature of things, and plays with the idea of fluctuation by presenting meaning and perception as flexible, not fixed. In a 2008 Globe and Mail article by Gary Michael Dault, Groombridge is quoted as saying ""I love the arrested moment. Meaning that moment when just to look at something stops it in its tracks—like slicing one frame from a film." Groombridge's work combines poetic and literal elements to comment on select moments of history and life that are worthy of contemplation and respect. In his work Groombridge also often refers to systems of knowledge such as measurement, geography and cosmology. As E. C. Woodley states in a 2013 review in Art in America, "Signs of engagement with the cosmos appear frequently in Brian Groombridge's work, representing a hunger for knowledge beyond ourselves and a faith in such knowledge even if it is minuscule compared with what we don't know."
