= Laurence B. Mussio =

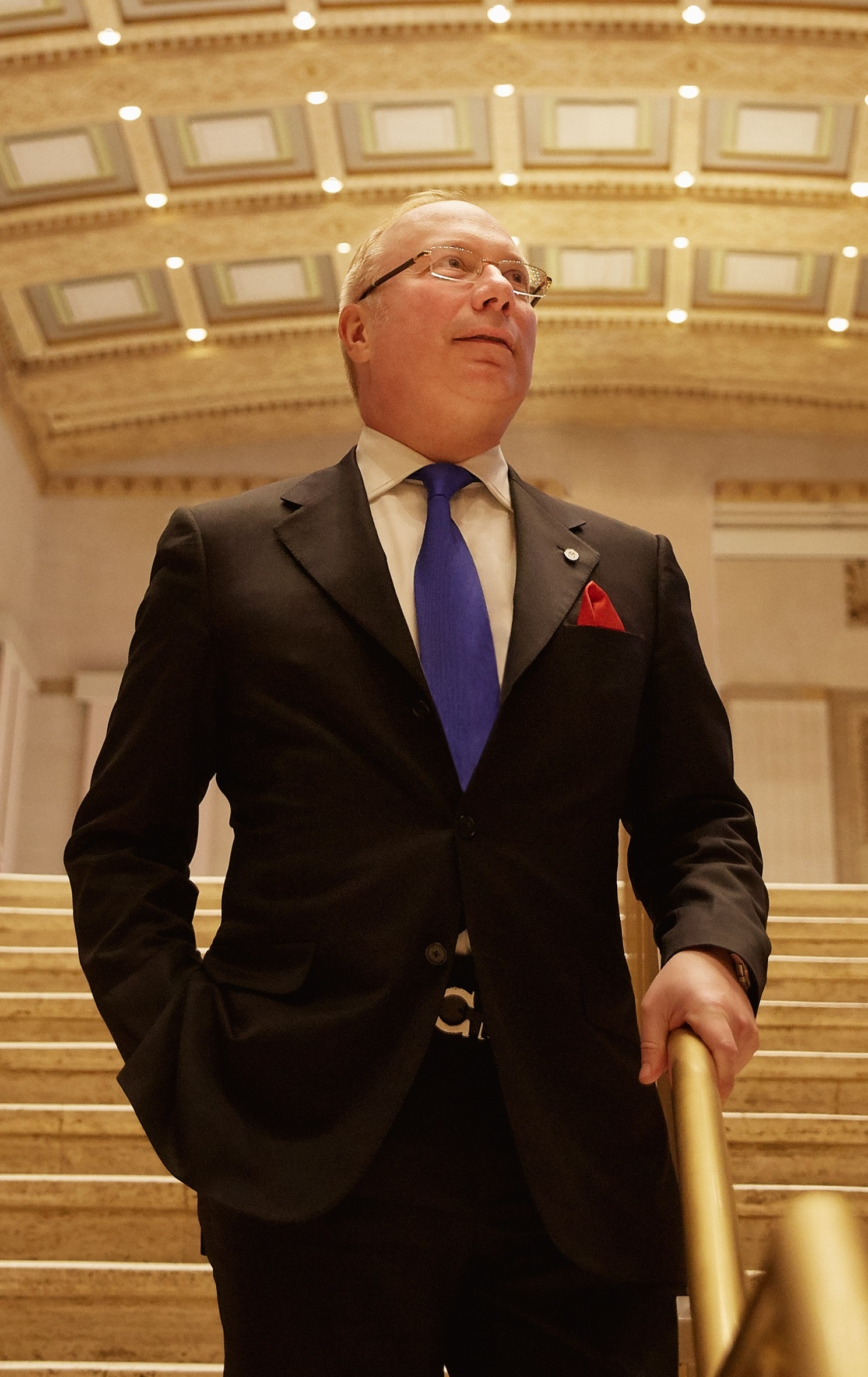
- Born: Laurence Basilio Mussio; December 15, 1964 (age 61); Sarnia, Ontario, Canada
- Education: Università del Sacro Cuore di Milano; Università degli Studi di Udine; King's College, University of Western Ontario; McMaster University; York University
- Occupations: Author, historian, consultant
- Website: http://www.drlaurencebmussio.com/

Laurence B. Mussio (born December 15, 1964) is a Canadian business historian, author, professor, management consultant and special advisor to senior executives, best known for his publications in finance, communications, political economy and reputation management.

== Early life and career ==
Mussio was born and grew up in Sarnia, Ontario. He studied at Università del Sacro Cuore di Milano and the Università degli Studi di Udine, Italy, while earning degrees from King's College, University of Western Ontario, then McMaster University and York University. He specialized in history, working under H.V. Nelles, FRSC at York University, where he earned his doctorate.

Mussio established himself as a senior business historian and author after publishing works on various aspects of Canadian and international business history and communications, principally with the McGill-Queen's University Press (MQUP). His primary field is economic and business history in the long-run experience of financial institutions. A major work in that field will appear in April 2020 with the MQUP release of Whom Fortune Favours: The Bank of Montreal and the Rise of North American Finance.Vol I: A Dominion of Capital, 1817–1945; Vol II: Territories of Transformation, 1946–2017.

Occasionally, Mussio has contributed to entirely different fields. In 2013, he translated the wartime diaries of a senior Vatican cardinal from the Italian, written in that tumultuous period between 1938 and 1947. In 2019, Mussio translated a second volume from the Italian examining other aspects of the cardinal's life.

Mussio is the founder of Signal Influence Executive Research and Communications Inc, a communication and consulting company based in Toronto and MLEK Consultants & Strategic Advisors, a training and development firm. In 2011, Mussio was named to Canada's Who's Who.

== Teaching career ==
As an academic, Mussio has taught post-graduate courses at McMaster University, Hamilton (Master of Communications Management program), Syracuse University, NY (S.I. Newhouse School of Public Communications) and York University, Toronto (Schulich School of Business MBA). At McMaster University, he designed and led undergraduate courses in the Department of Communication Studies and Multimedia and both taught and coordinated graduate theses in the Master of Communications Management (MCM) Program. In 2015, Mussio was awarded the Ontario Undergraduate Student Alliance Award for Teaching Excellence.

== Research and advocacy ==
In addition to his teaching and consultancy schedule, Mussio has been engaged in a multi-year research and publication project examining two hundred years of the Bank of Montreal. In 2016, McGill-Queen's University Press published his popular history of BMO entitled; A Vision Greater Than Themselves: The Making of the Bank of Montreal, 1817–2017. The bank subsequently sent Mussio on a speaking tour of Canada, the United States and the United Kingdom related to the bank's bicentenary. The popular history was followed by a work of independent scholarship to be released in April 2020 called Whom Fortune Favours: The Bank of Montreal and the Rise of North American Finance [Vol I: A Dominion of Capital, 1817–1945; Vol II: Territories of Transformation, 1946–2017. The work will also be available in French: À Qui La Fortune Sourit: La Banque de Montréal Et l'essor financier de l'Amérique Du Nord.

In October 2018, Mussio co-founded the Long Run Initiative, or LRI with Professor John Turner and Dr. Michael Aldous of Queen's University Belfast. The LRI brings together academics, business leaders and policy makers to facilitate a deeper understanding of contemporary challenges and trends through the analysis of historical records. Its governors include William A. Downe, The Hon. Kevin G. Lynch, Professor Geoff Jones of Harvard University, and David Walmsley, editor-in-chief of The Globe and Mail.

== Publications ==
=== Books ===
- Mussio, Laurence B. (2020). Whom Fortune Favours: The Bank of Montreal and the Ascent of Canadian Banking, 1817–2017. McGill-Queen's University Press. ISBN 9780228000686.
- Mussio, Laurence B. (2020). A Qui La Fortune Sourit: La Banque de Montréal Et l'Essor Financier de l'Amérique Du Nord Mussio, Montreal and Kingston. McGill-Queen's University Press. ISBN 9780228000709.
- Mussio, Laurence B. (2016). A Vision Greater than Themselves: The Making of the Bank of Montreal, 1817-2017. Montreal and Kingston: McGill-Queen's University Press. ISBN 9780773548299.
- Mussio, Laurence B. (2016). Un destin plus grand que soi: L'histoire de la Banque de Montréal, 1817 – 2017. Montreal and Kingston: McGill-Queen's University Press. ISBN 9780773548282.
- Mussio, Laurence B. (2001). Telecom Nation: Telecommunications, Computers and Governments in Canada. Montreal and Kingston: McGill-Queen's University Press. ISBN 9780773521759.
- Mussio, Laurence B. (2005). Becoming Bell: The Remarkable Story of a Canadian Enterprise, 1st Edition. Bell Canada. ISBN 9782980884917.

=== Other publications ===
- Celso Costantini: A Role Model for Christians, written by Bruno Fabio Pighin, translated by Laurence B. Mussio. TLAC Printing & Publishing. 2019. ISBN 978-1-77136-804-9.
- The Secrets of a Vatican Cardinal: Celso Costantini's Wartime Diaries, 1938-1947, written by Celso Costantini, edited by Bruno Fabio Pighin, translated by Laurence B. Mussio, (Montreal: McGill-Queen's University Press, 2014) ISBN 978-0773542990
- "Canadian Entrepreneurs and the Preservation of the Capitalist Peace in the North Atlantic Triangle in the Civil War Era, 1861–1871." (Co-author Andrew Smith). Enterprise and Society August 2016, Volume17 (Issue 3) 515–545
- The Present and Future of Public-Private Partnerships in Canada (National Bank Financial Markets Research Paper, May 2011).
- "Depth perceptions (Review of" The Shallows" by Nicholas Carr)." Journal of Professional Communication 1, no. 1 (2011).
- The Persuasive Presentation and the Successful Executive (CSAE Monograph Series, 2010) ISBN 978-0-9811910-1-0
- Briefing Executives in an Information Intensive World (CSAE Monograph Series, 2009) ISBN 978-0-9811910-0-3
- Three Generations Strong: A History of the Famè Furlane Club of Toronto, 1932–2009 (Famee Furlane, 2009) ISBN 978-0968168806
- "Canadian Entrepreneurs and the Preservation of the Capitalist Peace in the North Atlantic Triangle in the Civil War Era, 1861–1871." (Co-author Andrew Smith). Enterprise and Society August 2016, Volume17 (Issue 3) 515–545
- "Prophets Without Honour? Canadian Policy Makers and the First Information Highway, 1969–1975" in Communication history in Canada, ed. Daniel J. Robinson (Oxford University Press, 2003) ISBN 0195430182
- ""Hello Central?": Gender, Technology and Culture in the Formation of Telephone Systems." Canadian Journal of Communication 18, no. 2 (1993).

=== Affiliations ===
- Long Run Initiative (LRI)
- Canadian Training and Development Professional Designation (CTDP)
- Association of Business Historians (ABH) in the United Kingdom
- North American-based Business History Conference (BHC)
