= List of numbered roads in Lambton County =

List of county roads

This page lists all of the numbered county roads in Lambton County, Ontario

| Number | Length (km) | Length (mi) | Southern or western terminus | Northern or eastern terminus | Local names | Formed | Removed | Notes |
|---|---|---|---|---|---|---|---|---|
| County Road 1 | — | — | St. Clair Parkway in Port Lambton | Highway 40 east of Port Lambton | Lambton Line | — | — | |
| County Road 2 | — | — | St. Clair Parkway in Sombra | County Road 79 at Cairo | Bentpath Line | — | — | |
| County Road 4 | — | — | St. Clair Parkway in Corunna | County Road 79 north of Alvinston | Hill Street, Petrolia Line | — | — | Originally called the 10th Line |
| County Road 5 | — | — | Highway 21 near Grand Bend | County Road 5 (Middlesex County) at the Ausable River | Greenway Road | — | — | |
| County Road 6 | — | — | Highway 21 at Lambton Shores | County Road 7 (Middlesex County) at the Ausable River | Thomson Line | — | — | Easternmost section formerly Highway 7 |
| County Road 7 | — | — | Michigan Avenue in Sarnia | Highway 21 at Lambton Shores | Christina Street, Lakeshore Road | — | — | |
| County Road 8 | — | — | County Road 8 (Chatham–Kent) near Florence | Highway 402 / Highway 21 near Warwick | Forest Road, Inwood Road, Shetland Road | — | — | |
| County Road 9 | — | — | County Road 22 / County Road 79 near Warwick | County Road 79 near Thedford | Northville Road | — | — | |
| County Road 11 | — | — | County Road 7 near Camlachie | Highway 21 near Forest, Ontario | Aberarder Line | — | — | |
| County Road 12 | — | — | County Road 7 near Forest | County Road 12 (Middlesex County) near Arkona | Townsend Line | — | — | |
| County Road 14 | — | — | County Road 20 / County Road 31 at Sarnia | County Road 22 near Wyoming | Churchill Line | — | — | |
| County Road 15 | — | — | County Road 12 (Middlesex County) near Rutherford | County Road 21 in Rutherford | Dawn Mills Road | — | — | |
| County Road 16 | — | — | Vidal Street (southbound) / Brock Street (northbound) in Sarnia | Highway 40 / County Road 22 in Sarnia | London Road | — | — | Easternmost section formerly Highway 402 |
| County Road 17 | — | — | Vidal Street North (southbound) / Brock Street (northbound) in Sarnia | Highway 40 in Sarnia | Wellington Street | — | — | |
| County Road 18 | — | — | County Road 79 near Port Franks | County Road 18 (Middlesex County) at the Ausable River | Bog Line | — | — | |
| County Road 19 | — | — | County Road 29 in Sarnia | County Road 27 at Sarnia | Michigan Avenue, Michigan Line | — | — | |
| County Road 20 | — | — | Highway 40 at Sarnia | County Road 4 near Sarnia | Plank Road | — | — | |
| County Road 21 | — | — | County Road 21 (Chatham–Kent) near Dresden | Highway 402 / County Road 30 at Reece's Corners | Oil Heritage Road, Broadway Street | — | — | Formerly southern part of Highway 21 |
| County Road 22 | — | — | Highway 40 / County Road 16 in Sarnia | County Road 22 (Middlesex County) near Warwick | London Line | — | — | Formerly Highway 22 and westernmost section of Highway 7 |
| County Road 23 | — | — | County Road 79 in Alvinston | County Road 80 near Alvinston | Railroad Street, River Street | — | — | |
| County Road 25 | — | — | Vidal Street (southbound) / Brock Street (northbound) in Sarnia | County Road 39 / County Road 79 in Watford | Confederation Line | — | — | |
| County Road 26 | — | — | County Road 44 (Chatham–Kent) near Tupperville | County Road 7 at Brights Grove | Mandaumin Road | — | — | |
| County Road 27 | — | — | Highway 402 / Highway 40 at Sarnia | County Road 7 at Sarnia | Modeland Road | — | — | |
| County Road 28 | — | — | St. Clair Parkway near Sombra | Highway 40 near Sombra | Holt Line | — | — | |
| County Road 29 | — | — | Highway 40 at Sarnia | County Road 7 at Sarnia | Indian Road | — | — | |
| County Road 30 | — | — | Highway 402 / County Road 21 at Reece's Corners | County Road 7 near Camlachie | Oil Heritage Road | — | — | |
| County Road 31 | — | — | County Road 31 (Chatham–Kent) near Wallaceburg | County Road 14 / County Road 20 at Sarnia | Kimball Road | — | — | |
| County Road 33 | — | — | County Road 33 (Chatham–Kent) near Wallaceburg | Vidal Street and County Road 34 at Sarnia | St. Clair Parkway | 1977 | 1984 | Formerly Highway 40; turned back in stages |
| County Road 34 | — | — | St. Clair Parkway at Sarnia | Highway 40 at Sarnia | Churchill Line | 1993 | current | Formerly Highway 40 and Highway 40B |
| County Road 35 | — | — | St. Clair Parkway near Corunna | Highway 40 near Corunna | La Salle Line | — | — | |
| County Road 36 | — | — | St. Clair Parkway near Courtright | Highway 40 near Courtright | Bickford Line | — | — | |
| County Road 39 | — | — | County Road 79 in Watford | County Road 39 (Middlesex County) near Kerwood | Confederation Line | — | — | |
| County Road 79 | — | — | County Road 16 (Chatham–Kent) near Bothwell | Highway 21 near Port Franks | Northville Road, Arkona Road, Egremont Road, Nauvoo Road, Cairo Road | 1997 | current | Formerly Highway 82 (1938-1982), Highway 79 (1937-1997) and Highway 7 (1920-1997) |
| County Road 80 | — | — | St. Clair Parkway in Courtright | County Road 80 (Middlesex County) near Alvinston | Courtright Line | — | — | Formerly Highway 80 |
Former
