= Ontario Highway 80 =

Former Ontario provincial highway

King's Highway 80

Route information
- Maintained by the Ministry of Transportation
- Length: 69.6 km (43.2 mi)
- Existed: August 11, 1937–April 1, 1997

Major junctions
- West end: St. Clair Parkway (old Highway 40) in Courtright
- Highway 40 – Sarnia; Highway 21 – Petrolia, Oil Springs; Highway 79 – Alvinston
- East end: Highway 2 in Strathburn

Location
- Country: Canada
- Province: Ontario
- Towns: Courtright, Brigden, Glencoe, Strathburn

Highway system
- Ontario provincial highways; Current; Former; 400-series
← Highway 77	→ Highway 85
Former provincial highways
← Highway 79	Highway 81 →

King's Highway 80, commonly referred to as Highway 80, was a provincially maintained highway in the Canadian province of Ontario. It travelled in an east–west direction south of Sarnia from Courtright to Strathburn. Beginning at the St. Clair Parkway near the shores of the St. Clair River, the route travelled 69.6 kilometres (43.2 mi), intersecting Highway 40, Highway 21 and Highway 79 before ending at Highway 2. In addition to the towns at either terminus, Highway 80 serviced the communities of Brigden, Glencoe and Alvinston. The entire route was and remains two lanes wide.

Highway 80 was first designated in 1937, travelling east from Highway 79 in Alvinston to Highway 2 in Strathburn. Most of the original winding highway was bypassed in 1962, and the route was extended west in 1963 to what was then Highway 40, now the St. Clair Parkway. It remained this way for over 30 years before being decommissioned as a provincial highway entirely in the mass downloading of highways in 1997. Today the route is known as County Road 80.

== Route description ==
Highway 80 was a two-laned rural connector highway in Lambton and Middlesex Counties. The generally straight route followed Courtright Line and Dundonald Road, both concession roads created through statute labour during the 1800s. The route largely parallels a now abandoned branch of the Canada Southern Railway which ran from St. Thomas to Courtright.

Beginning near the shore of the St. Clair River, at the St. Clair Parkway, the former highway travels east, encountering Highway 40 approximately 5 km (3.1 mi) inshore. Between there and the community of Kimball, the route veers several times, a realignment which improved the highway's crossing of the now abandoned railway. The route bisects the Brigden Crown Game Preserve, a Carolinian bird sanctuary, before entering the village of Brigden at the eastern boundary of the preserve. Between Brigden and former Highway 21 at Oil City, the route crosses a flat agricultural area and encounters the historic Sarnia Plank Road.

East of Oil City, Highway 80 continues through a large swath of farmland, passing south of the communities of Glen Rae, Weidman and Inwood. Prior to crossing the Sydenham River and entering Middlesex County, the route encounters former Highway 79 south of the town of Alvinston. Within Middlesex County, the highway curves southeast onto Dundonald Road. It crosses both the CN and CP railways in the vicinity of Glencoe, which the route bisects. The final 5 km (3.1 mi) of the highway travels through farmland before entering the community of Strathburn, where the route ends at former Highway 2 (Longwoods Road).

== History ==
Highway 80 was first established as a provincial highway on August 11, 1937, when the Department of Highways (DHO), predecessor to the Ministry of Transportation of Ontario (MTO), assumed the road between Alvinston and Strathburn, connecting Highway 2 and Highway 79. In its original incarnation, Highway 80 met Highway 79 in Alvinston at the intersection of Nauvoo Road and Centre Street. From there it travelled east to River Street, where it jogged north to Sydenham Street. From there, the route crossed the Sydenham River and followed the Gardner Trail, Lobelia Street, Conservation Road and Calvert Drive to arrive at the more modern routing of the highway. The original length of Highway 80 was 13.9 mi (22.4 km).

However, this winding route proved to be too dangerous and difficult for the explosion of vehicle traffic that occurred after World War II. Alvinston was originally reliant on the Canada Southern Railway, which was taken over by the Michigan Central Railroad and that by New York Central. However, by 1960 the use of the rails had declined so much that service was stopped. The tracks were lifted two years later. In response, the DHO sought to improve the connection between Alvinston and Glencoe. Courtright Line, which ended at Cameron Road and did not cross the Sydenham River, was chosen as an ideal route to extend east. This new route opened in May 1962.

In 1963, Highway 80 was extended west to Highway 40 at Courtright, bringing it to its peak length of 69.6 km (43.2 mi). Prior to being renumbered, the DHO reconstructed the road, originally built through statute labour and improved slightly as a township road, and referred to it as Development Road 471. There are conflicting dates as to when this extension became Highway 80. The 1963 Annual report indicates both July 1 and August 12 as the assumption date. However, an annual average daily traffic log published in 1970 indicates that the extension was assumed on September 4. The new extension was immediately paved, as it was a gravel road. The route remained unchanged for the next 34 years, until April 1, 1997, when it was transferred, or downloaded, to Lambton County and Middlesex County. The former highway is now known as County Road 80 throughout its length.

== Major intersections ==
The following table lists the major junctions along Highway 80, as noted by the Ministry of Transportation of Ontario.

Division	Location	km	mi	Destinations	Notes
Lambton	Courtright	0.0	0.0	County Road 33 (St. Clair Parkway)	Old Highway 40
Lambton	St. Clair	4.9	3.0	Highway 40	
Lambton	Kimball	10.5	6.5	County Road 31 (Kimball Road)	
Lambton	St. Clair–Enniskillen boundary	19.7	12.2	County Road 26 (Mandaumin Road)	
Lambton	Enniskillen	28.7	17.8	County Road 21 (Oil Heritage Road)	Formerly Highway 21
Lambton	Brooke–Alvinston	40.5	25.2	County Road 8 (Inwood Road)	
Lambton	Brooke–Alvinston	49.6	30.8	County Road 79 (Nauvoo Road)	Formerly Highway 79
Lambton	Brooke–Alvinston	51.1	31.8	River Street / Cameron Road	Formerly Lambton County Road 23
Middlesex	Southwest Middlesex	56.1	34.9	County Road 10 (Calvert Drive)	
Middlesex	Glencoe	64.9	40.3	County Road 14 north (Glendon Drive)	
Middlesex	Glencoe	65.7	40.8	County Road 14 south (Concession Drive)	
Middlesex	Strathburn	69.6	43.2	County Road 2 (Longwoods Road)	Formerly Highway 2
1.000 mi = 1.609 km; 1.000 km = 0.621 mi
