= Ontario Highway 81 =

Former Ontario provincial highway

King's Highway 81

Route information
- Maintained by the Ministry of Transportation
- Length: 69.6 km (43.2 mi)
- Existed: September 16, 1936–January 1, 1998

Major junctions
- South end: Highway 2 in Delaware
- Highway 22 – Sarnia, London; Highway 7 near Parkhill
- North end: Government Road in Grand Bend

Location
- Country: Canada
- Province: Ontario
- Towns: Delaware, Mount Brydges, Strathroy, Parkhill, Grand Bend

Highway system
- Ontario provincial highways; Current; Former; 400-series
← Highway 80	→ Highway 82

King's Highway 81, also known as Highway 81, was a provincially maintained highway in the Canadian province of Ontario. The winding north–south route connected Highway 2 in Delaware with Highway 21 in Grand Bend, passing through Mount Brydges, Strathroy and Parkhill en route. Highway 81 was first designated in 1936 and extended in 1937, and retained generally the same route throughout its existence until it was transferred to the responsibility of Middlesex County and Huron County in 1997 and 1998. Today the entire route is known as Middlesex County Road 81 and Huron County Road 81.

== Route description ==
Highway 81 once served as a connecting route between Highway 2 and Highway 7 before its role was largely supplanted by the completion of Highway 402, which generally parallels the southern half of the route. Beginning at former Highway 2 in Delaware, what is now known as Middlesex County Road 81 travels west through Campbellvale, Mount Brydges and Caradoc, curving slightly to the northwest. The route travels through a large swath of farmland between Caradoc and Strathroy, the latter from which it exits to the north. After crossing Highway 402 at Exit 65, the highway encounters former Highway 22 at Wrightmans Corners.

Continuing north, the highway takes a veering route north and west towards Parkhill, bisecting the communities of Crathie and Bornish. Immediately southeast of Parkhill, Highway 81 and Highway 7 shared a brief concurrency, though neither are provincial highways today.

North of Parkhill, former Highway 81 continues to zig-zag north and west towards Grand Bend on the shores of Lake Huron. A one kilometre (0.6 mi) section of the route between Corbett and Greenway straddles the boundary of Middlesex County and Huron County. Beyond there, the final five kilometres (3.1 mi) lay in the latter. The highway ends approximately one kilometre northwest of Highway 21 at Government Road, a beach access road along the shoreline of Lake Huron.

== History ==
Highway 81 was first established by the Department of Highways (DHO) in late-1936 to connect Highway 2 at Delaware and Highway 22 at Strathroy. On September 16, 1936, 16.9 kilometres (10.5 mi) of roadway was assumed from Middlesex County by the DHO. The following year, several more roads were assumed on September 1 and numbered as an extension of Highway 81 to Grand Bend, bringing the highway to a length of 70.8 kilometres (44.0 mi).

Originally, the mostly-gravel-surfaced highway passed through the community of Springbank via Springbank Road and Glasgow Street. However, it was relocated to the southwest in 1946 to eliminate several sharp corners along the route. It was already paved between Highway 2 near Delaware and Mount Brydges, as well as between Highway 7 in Parkhill and Moray when it was assumed by the DHO. Paving between Mount Brydges and Strathroy was completed by 1950; the section between Moray and Grand Bend was paved within the next two years. A short section between Strathroy and Highway 22 was paved by 1954. The remainder of the route was paved by 1965, between Highway 22 north of Strathroy and Highway 7 east of Parkhill. In 1969, the Parkhill Dam was constructed, creating the Parkhill Reservoir. As a result of this work, Highway 81 was diverted to the east, removing the slight jog at McGuffin Hills Drive.

As part of a series of budget cuts initiated by premier Mike Harris under his Common Sense Revolution platform in 1995, numerous highways deemed to no longer be of significance to the provincial network were decommissioned and responsibility for the routes transferred to a lower level of government, a process referred to as downloading. Highway 81 was deemed to serve a local function and was transferred to Middlesex and Huron counties in two separate downloads. The section of the route between Delaware and Strathroy was transferred on April 1, 1997. The remainder of the highway, between Strathroy and Grand Bend, was transferred, on January 1, decommissioning the route in the process.

== Major intersections ==
The following table lists the major junctions along Highway 81, as noted by the Ministry of Transportation of Ontario.

Division	Location	km	mi	Destinations	Notes
Middlesex	Delaware	0.0	0.0	County Road 2	Formerly Highway 2
Middlesex	Mount Brydges	6.1	3.8	County Road 14 (Glendon Drive)	
Middlesex	Strathroy	18.2	11.3	Metcalfe Street	
Middlesex	Strathroy	19.1	11.9	Victoria Street	
Middlesex	Strathroy	22.4	13.9	Highway 402	Exit 65
Middlesex	Wrightmans Corners	23.8	14.8	County Road 22	Formerly Highway 22
Middlesex	Crathie	27.7	17.2	County Road 19 north (Petty Street) – Ailsa Craig	
Middlesex	North Middlesex	32.5	20.2	County Road 12 west (Townsend Line) – Arkona	
Middlesex	North Middlesex	42.0	26.1	County Road 17 (Nairn Road)	
Middlesex	North Middlesex	44.1	27.4	Highway 7 east (Elginfield Road)	
Middlesex	Parkhill	46.2	28.7	Highway 7 west (Elginfield Road)	
Middlesex	Parkhill	47.8	29.7	Bethany Street	
Middlesex	Moray	52.6	32.7	County Road 24 (McGillivray Drive)	
Middlesex–Huron boundary	Corbett	57.7	35.9	County Road 5 east (Mount Carmel Drive)	
Middlesex–Huron boundary	Greenway	59.0	36.7	County Road 5 west (Greenway Drive)	
Huron	South Huron	63.9	39.7	County Road 10 (Crediton Road)	
Huron	Grand Bend	68.9	42.8	Highway 21 (Ontario Street)	
Huron	Grand Bend	69.6	43.2	Government Road	
1.000 mi = 1.609 km; 1.000 km = 0.621 mi
