= Ontario Highway 40 =

Ontario provincial highway

Highway 40
- Highway 40 highlighted in red

Route information
- Maintained by the Ministry of Transportation of Ontario
- Length: 91.4 km (56.8 mi)
- Existed: March 28, 1934–present

Major junctions
- South end: Highway 401 in Chatham-Kent
- North end: Highway 402 in Sarnia

Location
- Country: Canada
- Province: Ontario

Highway system
- Ontario provincial highways; Current; Former; 400-series
← Highway 37	→ Highway 41
Former provincial highways
← Highway 39

King's Highway 40, commonly referred to as Highway 40, is a provincially maintained highway in the southwestern portion of the Canadian province of Ontario. The 91.4-kilometre (56.8 mi) route links Chatham and Sarnia via Wallaceburg, following close to the St. Clair River. The southern terminus is at Highway 401 south of Chatham, while the northern terminus is at Highway 402 in Sarnia. The portion of Highway 40 between Highway 401 and north of Wallaceburg is within the municipality of Chatham-Kent, while the portion north of there is within Lambton County.

Highway 40 was built as a depression-relief project in 1934. The original routing followed what is now the St. Clair Parkway, but was rerouted to create that scenic road in the mid-1970s. The Sarnia Bypass was opened in 1963 as Highway 40A and renumbered as Highway 40 by 1966; the original route through Sarnia became Highway 40B until it was decommissioned during the early-1990s. The route was extended to Highway 3 in Blenheim during the early 1970s; however this section was decommissioned during the Ontario highway transfers in 1998.

== Route description ==
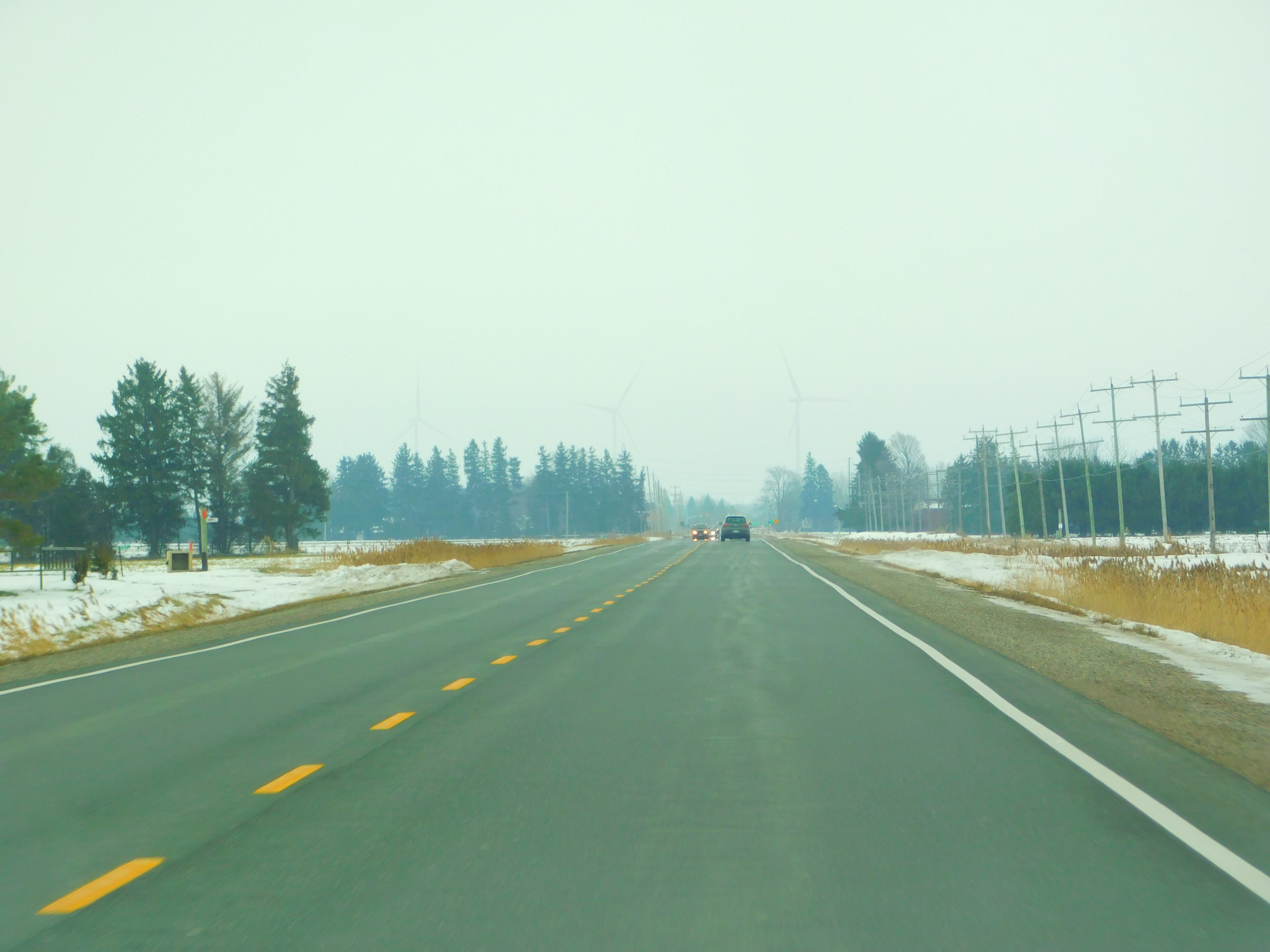
Highway 40 south of Chatham, approaching Highway 401

Highway 40 begins at an interchange with Highway 401 (Exit 90) southeast of the urban centre of Chatham, within the municipality of Chatham-Kent. Southwest of the interchange is C. M. Wilson Conservation Area, a 30-hectare (74-acre) campground named for the former Chair of Directors of the Lower Thames Valley Conservation Authority, Clarence Michael Wilson. The highway proceeds northwest as Communication Road, passing between farmland on the outskirts of Chatham. It crosses a Canadian National Railway (CN) mainline followed by the Thames River, then turns southwest onto Grand Avenue East and crosses a Canadian Pacific (CP) railway line. The highway progresses from the outskirts of Chatham to downtown before turning onto St. Clair Street and travelling northwest. It encounters the Nortown Centre mall as it passes through the suburbs and eventually leaves the city.

The African-Canadian Heritage Tour (ACHT) follows a portion of Highway 40 from Highway 401 to Chatham-Kent Road 29 (Countryview Line) at Oungah, where it turns east towards Dresden. The ACHT was begun in 1991, and by 1997 was the most successful heritage tour in North America. However, under a new tourism signage policy, markers signing the ACHT were removed from Highway 40 in 1998.

Oungah is the only community between Chatham and Wallaceburg, where the highway divides a large swath of farmland established in the fertile soils of the region. Immediately southeast of Wallaceburg, the highway turns to the north and becomes known as Murray Street. As it enters the town, it turns onto McNaughton Avenue and crosses a CSX railway line then the Sydenham River. The route turns west onto Dufferin Avenue and proceeds out of the town, crossing the CSX railway a second time. After crossing an irrigation canal, Highway 40 turns north onto Arnold Road and crosses the CSX railway a third and final time before exiting Chatham-Kent.

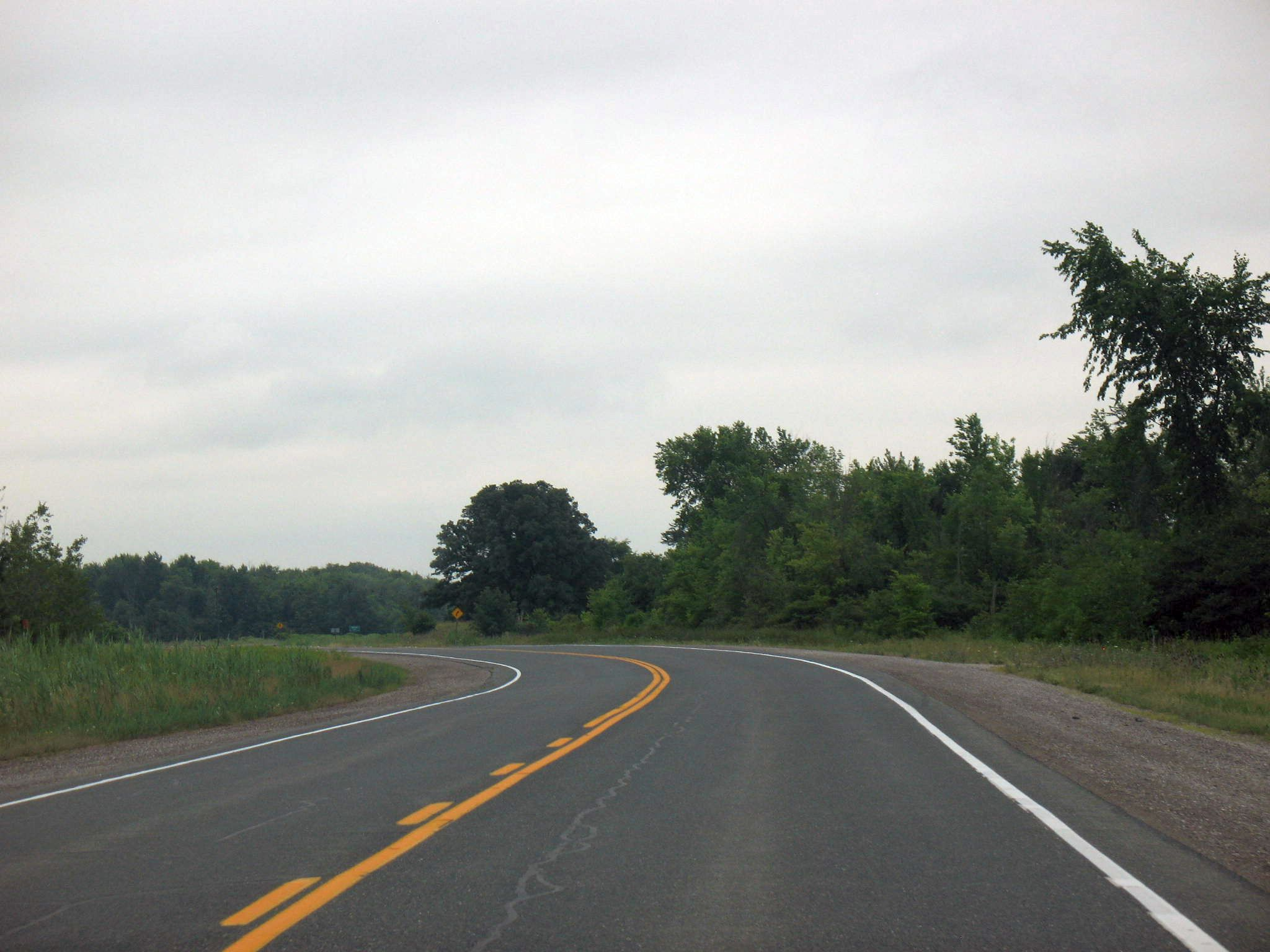
Highway 40 north of Wallaceburg

The route enters Lambton County in the municipality of St. Clair, passing through more farmland. Seven kilometres (4.3 mi) north of the county line, the highway crosses the W. Darcy McKeough Floodway, a channel constructed in 1984 to protect Wallaceburg from flooding. Highway 40 continues north, parallel to and several kilometres east of the St. Clair River. At Bickford, it swerves slightly to the east while passing between the CF Industries nitrogen fertilizer plant to the west and Bickford Oak Woods Provincial Conservation Reserve to the east. As the highway approaches the south end of Sarnia, it widens into a divided four-lane expressway and passes through Chemical Valley, the location of several industrial plants. The route enters Aamjiwnaang First Nation at La Salle Line where the surroundings abruptly switch to forest from a mix of industry and farmland.

At the intersection with Churchill Line, Highway 40 enters the Sarnia city limits and turns east onto the Sarnia Bypass, a four lane divided expressway with at-grade crossings. Approximately three kilometres (1.9 mi) east of the intersection, the highway narrows back to a two lane road.

Soon thereafter, the highway gently curves to the north, intersecting Plank Road and becoming Modeland Road. It passes along the western edge of the Sarnia Photovoltaic Power Plant, the largest photovoltaic (solar) power plant in the world in 2010. The route passes above a CN and VIA rail line as it travels along the eastern rural–urban fringe of the city. After a signalized intersection with Wellington Street, Highway 40 widens to a divided four lane expressway once more just prior to a Parclo A2 interchange with London Line (former Highway 7), then ends at a Parclo B4 interchange with Highway 402 (Exit 6). Modeland Road continues north as Lambton County Road 27, loses its grass median after a signalized intersection with Berger Road, narrows back to a two lane road after a signalized intersection with Michigan Avenue.

Both the Sarnia Bypass and Sarnia–Wallaceburg highway portions of Highway 40 were built with sufficient right-of-way to be upgraded to a full freeway in line with 400-series standards, however at present most of the route is a Super 2 with several sections upgraded to Super 4 expressways.

== History ==
George Doucett, Minister of Highways, cuts a ribbon to officially open the completed Highway 40 in Corunna on October 27, 1943.

Highway 40 was established at the height of the Great Depression, during the spring of 1934. The subsequent improvement of the roadway employed several dozen men eight hours per day, six days per week at minimum wage as a depression-relief project. It was created by the assumption of the St. Clair River Road, as well as several lengths of concession road created as a result of statute labour by adjacent settlers as part of the requirements to secure a land deed. On March 28, the road connecting Chatham with Wallaceburg was assumed by the Department of Highways (DHO) and designated King's Highway 40. Just over a month later, on May 2, the DHO assumed the route between Wallaceburg and Sarnia known today as the St. Clair Parkway. The 80.6-kilometre (50.1 mi) route connected Highway 2 in Chatham with Highway 7 and Highway 22 in Sarnia. The designation came just weeks before the 1934 Ontario general election, which saw Lambton West incumbent Conservative Member of the Legislative Assembly Andrew Robinson McMillen replaced by Liberal William Guthrie. As such, it was seen as a fruitless last-ditch attempt to garner votes.

=== Sarnia Bypass ===
Highway 402 facing east towards the Modeland Road intersection in 1959. In the distance beyond the intersection, the two carriageways converge into Highway 7. Modeland Road was reconstructed as an interchange by 1963.

In the decade following World War II, automobile use in North America increased dramatically, inundating many highways on the approach to and within urbanized areas with heavy traffic. As a result, freeways and bypasses were constructed throughout the province, allowing drivers not destined for those locations avoid congestion. In 1957, the DHO announced that Highway 402 would be extended east of Sarnia to London, starting with the construction of an interchange at Modeland Road to replace the at-grade intersection, although Highway 402 would continue to default to Highway 7 for the near future as the rest of the Highway 402 extension was still being planned. The interchange would nonetheless serve as the temporary terminus for a new bypass of Sarnia.

On May 1, 1963, portions of Modeland Road and Churchill Line were taken over by the DHO and numbered as Highway 40A. These roads were reconstructed over the following year to provincial standards. On October 25, 1963, the Sarnia Bypass was opened to traffic. Further construction was carried out until late 1965 to grade the route for future widening and build an overpass of the CN Railway south of Confederation Line, after which the bypass was renumbered as the northern end of Highway 40; the former route on the west side of Sarnia, via Brock Street, Vidal Street and Front Street, was subsequently renumbered Highway 40B.

In 1972, as part of the eventual extension to Highway 401 in London, Highway 402 east of the Murphy Road overpass was re-aligned so it no longer defaults to Highway 7 but instead bypasses the existing interchange with Highway 40 constructed in 1963-64. For the realigned Highway 402, a new interchange was constructed with Highway 40 just north of the existing interchange with Highway 7. In turn, Highway 7 (London Line) was redirected to connect with Exmouth Street to make for a continuous arterial road, which led to the two-lane residential portion of Exmouth Street being bypassed. In 1980, a second overpass was built at the interchange with Highway 7 (London Line) during the twinning of Highway 40 to Wellington Street.

Quinn Street was opened in 2002 to serve the shopping plazas off of Exmouth Street, and it follows the former alignment of Highway 402. In the late 2000s, immediately north of the interchange with Highway 402, a signalized intersection was created between Highway 40 and Berger Road, improving access to that new residential subdivision.

Due to rush-hour congestion on the two-lane portion of the Sarnia Bypass between Indian Road and Wellington Street, the MTO initiated an environmental assessment in 2022 to twin that segment to four lanes. A $31-million project commenced in June 2025 to replace the existing CN railway overpass, built in 1964 and refurbished in 1986, which will be demolished after the new four-lane bridge is constructed alongside.

The St. Clair River Road near Courtright circa 1900

=== St. Clair Parkway ===
During the late-1950s, the St. Lawrence Seaway project created a navigable lock system between the Atlantic Ocean and Lake Superior, while simultaneously reclaiming properties along the shoreline to create a continuous parkway. Seeing the potential tourist draw, several groups and organizations, including the district Chamber of Commerce, convened at the second annual conference of the Southwestern Ontario Chambers of Commerce and Boards of Trade in February 1960. Several resolutions were passed, calling for the DHO to create a new Highway 40 several kilometres inland from the St. Clair River and to have the old highway rebuilt as a scenic route. These resolutions were echoed by Lambton County Council and the 21 municipalities in the county.

Plans for the parkway were crafted over the next several years before being presented to minister of highways Charles MacNaughton in the spring of 1965. Subsequently, the St. Clair Parkway Commission was formed in 1966. Around this time, several large chemical refineries, including Union Carbide and S.O.A.P. were built south of Sarnia along the future highway corridor, an area known since the 1940s as Chemical Valley. Following several years of negotiations with the Aamjiwnaang First Nation (then the Chippewas of Sarnia), construction of the new inland route of Highway 40 began in July 1972. Working south from Sarnia, the first contract reached as far south as Highway 80 (Courtright Line), a distance of 13.4 km (8.3 mi). A second contract, awarded in 1974, extended construction south an additional 11.0 km (6.8 mi) to Lambton County Road 2 (Bentpath Line) near Sombra. The third and final contract was awarded in late 1975 to complete the remaining 13.2 km (8.2 mi) south of County Road 2.

The new Sarnia–Wallaceburg highway was opened to traffic as each contract was completed. The section from Sarnia to Highway 80 was opened in August 1975, and the section from Highway 80 to Sombra by mid-1977. The entire C$12.6 million ($61.6 million in 2025 dollars) project was opened ceremoniously by Highway Minister James Snow on November 25, 1977; he was late to the ceremony due to a snowstorm. The old alignment was transferred to the St. Clair Parkway Commission between Sarnia and Sombra in 1979, and from Sombra to Dufferin Avenue (opposite Walpole Island) by 1982. The remaining 3.0 km (1.9 mi) along Dufferin Avenue to the new Highway 40 was decommissioned between 1984 and 1986. Lambton County designated its portion of the former highway as County Road 33.

=== Kent County ===
Within Wallaceburg, Highway 40 originally followed Murray Street, King Street, McDougal Street across the Sydenham River and James Street. When the Lord Selkirk Bridge was opened November 23, 1950, the highway was rerouted along McNaughton Avenue and across the new bridge. In 1975, the alignment was briefly changed to Murray Street and the one-way pairing of Wellington and James Streets while the Lord Selkirk Bridge was rehabilitated and McNaughton Avenue widened to four lanes.

Within Chatham, Highway 40 originally followed St. Clair Street and Thames Street to intersect Highway 2 at Fifth Street adjacent to the Thames River. By 1940, it had been rerouted across the Third Street bridge and along Raleigh Street to end at Richmond Street. Despite the opening of Highway 401 south of Chatham on October 25, 1963, Highway 40 was not extended south of Chatham until the end of the decade.

In spring of 1969, the DHO assumed Communication Road south of Highway 401 to Highway 3 in Blenheim, in exchange for Highway 98, which became Kent County Road 8. Communication Road was numbered Highway 40 in July 1970, although there was no signed connection between Highway 401 and Chatham. The 1971 Ontario Road Map indicates that this gap had been closed, with Highway 40 following Richmond Street, Queen Street, and Park Avenue East to Communication Road. Along with the completion of the St. Clair Parkway, the route was now 103.1 km (64.1 mi) long.

=== Downloads ===
As part of a series of budget cuts initiated by premier Mike Harris under his Common Sense Revolution platform in 1995, numerous highways deemed to no longer be of significance to the provincial network were decommissioned and responsibility for the routes transferred to a lower level of government, a process referred to as downloading. Highway 3 was downloaded between Leamington and west of St. Thomas, rendering Highway 40 south of Highway 401 redundant. Accordingly, Highway 40 was transferred to Kent County on January 1, 1998.

== Major intersections ==
The following table lists the major junctions along Highway 40, as noted by the Ministry of Transportation of Ontario.

Division	Location	km	mi	Destinations	Notes
Chatham-Kent	Blenheim	−9.7	−6.0	Municipal Road 3 / Municipal Road 11 (Marlborough Street / Chatham Street)	Former Highway 40 southern terminus; formerly Highway 3; former Highway 40 follows present-day Municipal Road 11 north
Chatham-Kent	Blenheim	−9.4	−5.8	Municipal Road 19 (Talbot Street)	
Chatham-Kent	Kent Centre	0.0	0.0	Highway 401 – Windsor, London Highway 40 begins Chatham-Kent Municipal Road 11 ends	Highway 40 southern terminus; Highway 401 exit 90
Chatham-Kent		1.5	0.93	Municipal Road 14 (Creek Road / Pinehurst Line)	
Chatham-Kent		5.3	3.3	Municipal Road 18 east (Fairview Line)	
Chatham-Kent	Chatham	6.3	3.9	Municipal Road 18 west (Park Avenue)	
Chatham-Kent	Chatham	6.4	4.0	Municipal Road 39 east (River Line) / Colborne Street	
Chatham-Kent	Chatham	7.4	4.6	Municipal Road 30 north (Prince Albert Road) Municipal Road 2 east (Longwoods Road)	Formerly Highway 2 east; former southern end of Highway 2 concurrency
Chatham-Kent	Chatham	12.1	7.5	Municipal Road 2 west (Grand Avenue)	Formerly Highway 2 west; former northern end of Highway 2 concurrency
Chatham-Kent		19.1	11.9	Municipal Road 35 (St. Andrews Line / Eberts Line)	
Chatham-Kent	Oungah	23.4	14.5	Municipal Road 29 (Countryview Line) – Dresden	
Chatham-Kent		30.5	19.0	Municipal Road 42 (Electric Line / Oldfield Line)	
Chatham-Kent	Wallaceburg	38.0	23.6	Municipal Road 15 east (Baseline)	
Chatham-Kent	Wallaceburg	39.6	24.6	Municipal Road 78 east – Dresden	Formerly Highway 78 east
Chatham-Kent	Wallaceburg	42.2	26.2	Municipal Road 33 (Dufferin Avenue)	To St. Clair Parkway
Lambton	St. Clair	49.0	30.4	County Road 1 west (Lambton Line) – Port Lambton	
Lambton	St. Clair	53.1	33.0	County Road 28 west (Holt Line)	
Lambton	St. Clair	55.8	34.7	County Road 2 (Bentpath Line)	
Lambton	St. Clair	66.6	41.4	County Road 80 (Courtright Line) – Courtright, Brigden	Formerly Highway 80
Lambton	St. Clair	74.6	46.4	County Road 4 (Petrolia Line) – Corunna, Petrolia	
Lambton	Sarnia	77.3	48.0	County Road 35 west (La Salle Street)	Sarnia city limits
Lambton	Sarnia	80.1	49.8	Churchill Line	Formerly Highway 40B north; Highway 40 follows Churchill Line east
Lambton	Sarnia	82.8	51.4	County Road 29 north (Indian Road)	
Lambton	Sarnia	85.2	52.9	County Road 20 (Plank Road)	Churchill Line becomes Modeland Road
Lambton	Sarnia	87.9	54.6	County Road 25 (Confederation Street)	
Lambton	Sarnia	90.7	56.4	County Road 22 (London Line) – London	Interchange; formerly Highway 7
Lambton	Sarnia	91.4	56.8	Highway 402 – London, Bridge to U.S.A. County Road 27 north (Modeland Road)	Highway 40 northern terminus; Highway 402 exit 6
1.000 mi = 1.609 km; 1.000 km = 0.621 mi: Closed/former; Route transition

== Suffixed routes ==
=== Highway 40A ===
Highway 40A
- Location: Churchill Road, Modeland Road
- Length: 8.0 km (5.0 mi)
- Existed: May 1, 1963–late 1965

See #Sarnia Bypass

Highway 40A was the temporary designation for the Sarnia Bypass between its assumption by the DHO on May 1, 1963, and its completion in late 1965. The DHO maintained the 8.0 km (5.0 mi) portion from the Sarnia city limits at Indian Road to Highway 402. When the bypass was completed, it was renumbered as Highway 40.

=== Highway 40B ===
Highway 40B
- Location: Vidal Street, Christina Street
- Length: 8.0 km (5.0 mi)
- Existed: Late 1965–1997

Highway 40B was the designation of the former route of Highway 40 through downtown Sarnia following the opening of the Sarnia Bypass in late 1965. The route followed Vidal Street from Churchill Road northeast, crossing the entrance to the St. Clair Tunnel just south of Campbell Street. It continued along Vidal to Wellington Street, where it turned west then north along Front Street to Highway 402. The following year, Highway 40B was rerouted from Vidal Street along Confederation Street west to Christina Street and north to Wellington Street. On August 24, 1979, the Donahue Bridge was opened over the St. Clair Tunnel, and Vidal Street split into a one-way pair with Brock Street to the north of the bridge. Highway 40B was rerouted along the one-way pairing to London Road then west to Front Street by 1980. It remained this way until some point between 1990 and 1998, when it was decommissioned as a provincial highway.

=== Highway 40C ===
Highway 40C
- Location: Cromwell Street, Front Street
- Length: 2.2 km (1.4 mi)
- Existed: 1963–1965

Highway 40C was signed along Cromwell Street and Front Street in downtown Sarnia briefly during the mid-1960s. It was extended from Exmouth Street to Highway 402 on January 6, 1964. The 1965 DHO Annual Report indicates that the route began at Vidal Street and ended at Errol Road (which intersects Christina Street but not Front Street), while the 1965 Ontario Road Map indicates that the portion of Front Street north of Exmouth Street was part of Highway 40C. The route does not appear on any other official road maps.
