= List of numbered roads in Middlesex County, Ontario =

List of county roads

This page lists all of the numbered county roads in Middlesex County, Ontario.

Note: when London became a separated municipality and absorbed Westminster Township, numbered County Roads in the township lost their designation. Many roads such as the former County Road 37 (Highland Avenue) are now named only.

Several roads near London were formerly provincial highways, but were not renumbered as County Roads when the highway designation was dropped.

- Highway 100: Airport Road (now "Veterans Memorial Parkway"), proposed ring road around London.
- Highway 126: Highbury Avenue from Highway 401 (exit 189) to Fanshawe Park Road. The portion of Highbury Avenue from the Thames River to Highway 401 was once known as the Wenige Expressway.
- Highway 135: Exeter Road. Turned back after Highway 402 was completed and rendered the designation redundant.

The reason for this somewhat high concentration of former provincially controlled roads in this county is due to London's size (roughly 340,000), as it is the anchor for Southwestern Ontario, and Middlesex County is geographically quite large (by southern Ontario standards), and is quite important due to agriculture in the area.

| Number | Names | Western/Southern Terminus | Eastern/Northern Terminus | Major Communities | Comments |
|---|---|---|---|---|---|
| 1 | Hagerty Road | Limerick Road (Boundary with Lambton County | Thames River (Boundary with Elgin County, continues as Elgin CR 103) | Wardsville, Ontario, Newbury, Ontario | |
| 2 | Longwoods Road, Dundas Street | Middlesex CR 14/Chatham-Kent CR 121 (Continues as Chatham-Kent CR 2) | Oxford County boundary (continues as Oxford CR 2) | Wardsville, Ontario, Melbourne, Ontario, Delaware, Ontario, Lambeth, Ontario, London, Ontario | Formerly Highway 2, has a concurrency with Highway 4 in London |
| 3 | Gideon Drive | CR 2 | London, Ontario City limits | Delaware, Ontario, Kilworth, Ontario, London, Ontario | Passes by the Komoka Provincial Park |
| 4 | Hamilton Road | Thames River | CR 29 | London, Ontario | No longer signed. |
| 5 | Greenway Drive, Grand Bend Road, Mount Carmel Drive | Ausable River (Boundary with Lambton County, continues as Lambton CR 5) | Highway 4 | Greenway, Ontario, Corbett, Ontario, Mount Carmel, Ontario | Brief concurrency with CR 81 (Former Highway 81) for around 1 km, acts as the boundary with Huron County. |
| 6 | Kerwood Road | CR 10 | CR 7 | Keyser, Ontario, Kerwood, Ontario | |
| 7 | Elginfield Road | Ausable River (Boundary with Lambton County, continues as Lambton CR 6) | Intersection with Highway 4 and Highway 7 | Parkhill, Ontario, Ailsa Craig, Ontario, Elginfield, Ontario | Formerly part of Highway 7, until all parts west of Highway 4 were turned back in 1998. |
| 8 | Thames Road, Winter Drive | Thames River (Boundary with Elgin County, continues as Elgin CR 8) | CR 6 | Ekfrid, Ontario, Appin, Ontario | |
| 9 | Melbourne Road, Metcalfe Street | CR 39 | Thames River (Boundary wit Elgin County, continues as Elgin CR 14) | Melbourne, Ontario, Longwood, Ontario, Strathroy, Ontario | |
| 10 | Conservation Road, Gore Road, Calvert Drive, Carroll Street, Glengyle Drive | CR 80 | CR 37 | Cairngorm, Ontario, Strathroy, Ontario | Briefly acts as the boundary with Lambton County. Previously ended at CR 9, extended eastward in 2015. |
| 10 (Original) | Robin's Hill Road (Formerly Wager Road) | CR 25 | CR 27 | London, Ontario, London International Airport, Fanshawe Conservation Area | |
| 11 | Muncey Road | Muncey, Ontario | CR 2 | Muncey, Ontario | Formerly continued along River Road to the Elgin County boundary, where it would continue as Elgin CR 20. |
| 12 | Townsend Line | Lambton County line, continues as Lambton CR 12 | CR 81 | Keyser, Ontario | |
| 13 | William Street, Alice Street | CR 20 | CR 47 | Lucan, Ontario | Acts as a short connector to CR 20 from Lucan. |
| 14 | Glendon Drive, Dundonald Road, Concession Drive, Clachan Road | Thames River (Boundary with Elgin County, continues as Elgin CR 7/Chatham-Kent CR 121) | London City Limits | Newbury, Ontario, Appin, Ontario, Longwoods, Ontario, Glencoe, Ontario, Mount Brydges, Ontario, Komoka, Ontario, Kilworth, Ontario | Briefly acts as the boundary between Chatham-Kent and Middlesex County, has a brief concurrency with CR 80. |
| 15 | Carriage Road | CR 35 | CR 2 | | Previously ended further south at Elgin County boundary |
| 16 | Komoka Road, Poplar Hill Road, Ilderton Road, Twelve Mile Road, Plover Mills Road | CR 3 | Oxford County line (Continues as Oxford CR 25) | Komoka, Ontario, Poplar Hill, Ontario, Ilderton, Ontario, Plover Mills, Ontario | Travels northwest-southeast to Poplar Hill, then roughly east–west to Oxford County, has a concurrency with CR 20 for around 2 km, and with CR 27 for around 4 km. |
| 17 | Nairn Road, Gainsborough Road | CR 7 | London city limits | Parkhill, Ontario (2 km to the north, along CR 7), Nairn, Ontario, Lobo, Ontario, Lobo Siding, Ontario, London, Ontario | Not related to Elgin CR 17, which is the border with Elgin County, in Southwold, Ontario, near London, Ontario |
| 18 | Parkhill Drive | Ausable River (Boundary with Lambton County) | CR 81 | Parkhill, Ontario | Not to be confused with Elgin CR 18, which acts as boundary between Middlesex and Elgin Counties. |
| 20 | Hyde Park Road, Ilderton Road, Denfield Road | London city limits | Highway 4 | London, Ontario, Ilderton, Ontario | Has a 2 km concurrency with CR 16. Formerly CR 22, until Highway 22 was downloaded in 1998, and was re-numbered. |
| 21 | Cassidy Road | CR 7 | CR 24 | | Travels through no towns, acts as a connecting link between CR 7 and CR 24 |
| 22 | Egremont Drive, Fanshawe Park Road | Sexton Road (Boundary with Lambton County, continues as Lambton CR 22) | London City Limits | Adelaide, Ontario, Strathroy, Ontario, Hickory Corner, Ontario, Poplar Hill, Ontario, Lobo, Ontario, Melrose, Ontario, London, Ontario | Section between London and Strathroy is extremely busy and congested, and only two-lanes. Whole route was formerly Highway 22. |
| 23 | Highbury Avenue | London City limits | Highway 7 | Ballymote, Ontario | |
| 24 | McGillivray Drive | CR 81 | Highway 4 | Moray, Ontario, West McGillivray, Ontario | Connects two major routes, Highway 4 and CR 81 (Former Highway 81) |
| 25 | Gore Road | London City Limits | Oxford County line (continues as Road 64) | London, Ontario | |
| 25 (Original) | Crumlin Road, Crumlin Sideroad | Gore Road | London International Airport | London, Ontario | No longer signed |
| 26 | Wilton Grove Road | London City Limits | CR 74 | London, Ontario | Less than 500 meters in length. Formerly extended to Interchange with Highway 135 (Exeter Road) and Highway 401 (Exit 186)). Formerly travelled down a brief segment of Wellington Road to the interchange. Formerly numbered as CR 37. |
| 26 (Original) | Boler Road, Southdale Road | London City Limits (just north of Southdale Road) | CR 43 | London, Ontario | No longer signed. |
| 27 | Nissouri Road, Plover Mills Road, Wellburn Road | CR 2 | Highway 7 (Boundary with Perth County) | Wellburn, Ontario | Has a 4 km concurrency with CR 16 |
| 28 | Medway Road, Thorndale Road, King Street | CR 20 | Cobble Hills Road (boundary with Oxford County, continues as Oxford CR 16) | Arva, Ontario, Ballymote, Ontario, Thorndale, Ontario, Cobble Hill, Ontario | Skirts the northern edge of London, Ontario |
| 29 | Hamilton Road | London city limits | Oxford County boundary, continues as Oxford CR 9 | London, Ontario, Nilestown, Ontario, Dorchester, Ontario, Putnam, Ontario | |
| 30 | Putnam Road | Avon Drive (Elgin CR 37, boundary with Elgin County. Continues as Elgin CR 47) | Thames River (Boundary with Oxford County, continues as Oxford CR 45) | Putnam, Ontario | |
| 31 | Heritage Road | CR 28 | CR 16/27 | Friendly Corners, Ontario | |
| 31 (Original) | Fanshawe Park Road | Intersection with CR 23 and Former Highway 22 | Fanshawe Conservation Area | London, Ontario, Fanshawe, Ontario | No longer signed, incorporated into CR 22 |
| 32 | Dorchester Road, Jane Street, Catherine Street, Shaw Road | Interchange with Highway 401 (Exit 199) | CR 2 | Dorchester, Ontario | Has a 2.5 km concurrency with CR 49. Formerly routed along Hamilton Road and Bridge Street in Dorchester. |
| 33 | Second Street | CR 45 | CR 39 | Strathroy, Ontario | Passes through the northern limits of Strathroy. Extended westward past CR 81 in 2020. Together with CR 45, the segment west of CR 81 acts as a western bypass of Strathroy. |
| 34 | Highbury Avenue, Webber Bourne | CR 2 | Elgin CR 30 on the border with Elgin County (Continues as Elgin CR 30). | London, Ontario | Very busy, freeway from north of Highway 401 (Exit 189), to Hamilton Road. Unknown if it is still signed as such. Formerly routed briefly along Hubrey Road until Highbury Avenue was extended. |
| 35 | Littlewood Drive | Oneida, Ontario | Highway 4 | Littlewood, Ontario, Tempo, Ontario, London, Ontario | Formerly extended to Highway 74 in Belmont, Ontario. Extended west from CR 15 to Oneida Reserve boundary. |
| 37 | McEvoy Road | CR 10 | CR 39 | Strathroy, Ontario | Short county road running along the eastern limit of Strathroy, acts as a connecting link between CR 39 and the eastern terminus of CR 10. Assumed by the county in 2015 |
| 38 | Vanneck Road | CR 10 | CR 22 | Kilworth, Ontario, Lobo Siding, Ontario | Basically, a spur of CR 14. Previously ended at CR 17, extended northward to CR 22 in 2007. |
| 39 | Napperton Drive, Albert Street, Metcalfe Street, Hickory Drive | Sexton Road (Boundary with Lambton County, continues as Lambton CR 39) | CR 22 | Napperton, Ontario, Strathroy, Ontario, Hickory Corner, Ontario | Basically a continuation of Lambton CR 39 |
| 41 | Adelaide Street | London City Limits | CR 16 | London, Ontario | |
| 42 | Clarke Road | London City Limits | Intersection with CR 28 | London, Ontario, Ballymote, Ontario | |
| 43 | White Oak Road, Scotland Drive | Glanworth Drive (Middlesex CR 35) | Southdale Road/London city limits | Glanworth, Ontario, London, Ontario | No longer signed |
| 44 | Victoria Street | CR 9 | CR 81 | Strathroy, Ontario | Offers a diversion from CR 81 to CR 9, and eventually CR 10 or CR 2 |
| 45 | Pike Road | CR 9 | CR 33 | Strathroy, Ontario | Acts as a western bypass of Strathroy. |
| 46 | Westdel Bourne | Longwoods Road (Middlesex CR 2, Former Highway 2) | Oxford Street (Middlesex CR 14) | London, Ontario | No longer signed |
| 47 | Saintsbury Line, Fallon Drive | Highway 4 | Highway 23 | Lucan, Ontario | |
| 49 | Catherine Street | London city limits | CR 73 | Nilestown, Ontario, Dorchester, Ontario | Has a 2.5 km concurrency with CR 32 |
| 50 | Prospect Hill Road | Highway 7 | Whalen Line (Boundary with Perth County, continues as Perth CR 139) | Prospect Hill, Ontario | Short county road |
| 51 | Sarnia Road | CR 20 | London city limits | Hyde Park, Ontario, London, Ontario | No longer signed. |
| 52 | Wonderland Road | Exeter Road | CR 26 (Southdale Road) | London, Ontario | No longer signed. |
| 54 | Base Line Road (Now Byron Baseline Road) | Westdel Bourne (Middlesex CR 46) | Wickerson Road | London, Ontario | No longer signed. |
| 55 | Roxburgh Road, Castleton Road | CR 37 | Dingman Drive | London, Ontario | No longer signed. |
| 56 | Wonderland Road | London city limits | CR 16 | London, Ontario | Very short county road |
| 59 | Granton Line | Intersection of Highway 7 and CR 23 | | | |
| 71 | Cobble Hills Road | Dundas St (CR 2) | Thorndale Road (Middlesex CR 28)/ Rd 84 (Oxford CR 16) | | Entirety of Cobble Hills Rd dictates the county border between Oxford and Middlesex |
| 73 | Elgin Road | Avon Drive (Elgin Road 37, boundary with Elgin County. Continues as Elgin CR 73) | CR 2 | Three Bridges, Ontario, Dorchester, Ontario, Mossley, Ontario, Harrietsville, Ontario | Portions south of CR 29 were Former Highway 73, which was turned back on January 1, 1998 |
| 74 | Westchester Bourne | 7th Avenue (Boundary with Elgin County, continues as Elgin CR 74) | CR 49 | Nilestown, Ontario, Derwent, Ontario, Belmont, Ontario (on the other side of the Elgin County line) | Portions south of CR 29 were formerly Highway 74, turned back April 1, 1997 |
| 75 | Bradley Avenue | London City Limits | CR 74 | | Assumed by the county in 2015 |
| 76 | Pratt Siding Road | Thames River (Boundary with Elgin County, continues as Elgin CR 76) | CR 2 | Woodgreen, Ontario | Formerly Highway 76, turned back in 1997. Connects Middlesex CR 2 to Elgin CR 76. |
| 77 | Murphy Drive | CR 6 | CR 9 | | Short county road. Used to be CR 7, but renumbered when portions of Highway 7 were downloaded to County in 1998 west of Highway 4 and CR 7 designated was shifted. |
| 78 | Donnybrook Road | CR 74 | CR 32 | Dorchester, Ontario | Short county road. This road was first designated as a county road in 2021 thus it is the newest county road in the system. This road was most likely designated a county road due to connecting CR 32 and CR 74 and also it had a sudden spike in use due to an industrial park nearby |
| 80 | Dundonald Road, Courtright Line | Lambton County boundary (Continues as Lambton CR 80) | CR 2 | Glencoe, Ontario | Formerly Highway 80, turned back in 1997 |
| 81 | Adelaide Road, Caradoc Street, Victoria Street, Center Road, Elginfield Road, Main Street, Grand Bend Road | CR 2 | CR 5 (Boundary with Huron County, continues as Huron CR 81 | Delaware, Ontario, West Delaware, Ontario, Mount Brydges, Ontario, Caradoc, Ontario, Strathroy, Ontario, Parkhill, Ontario, Corbett, Ontario, Greenway, Ontario | Formerly Highway 81. Has a brief concurrency with CR 7. |
