= Ontario Highway 22 =

Former Ontario provincial highway

King's Highway 22
- Egremont Drive
- A map of Highway 22; Highway 22 Previous route (1927–1947)

Route information
- Maintained by the Ministry of Transportation
- Length: 46.0 km (28.6 mi)
- Existed: July 2, 1927–January 1, 1998

Major junctions
- West end: Highway 7 / Highway 79 near Wisbeach
- Highway 81 near Strathroy
- East end: Highway 4 in London

Location
- Country: Canada
- Province: Ontario

Highway system
- Ontario provincial highways; Current; Former; 400-series
| ← Highway 21 | → Highway 23 |

King's Highway 22, commonly referred to as Highway 22, was a provincially maintained highway in the Canadian province of Ontario, located between Sarnia and London. Since 1998, the majority of the former route has been known as Middlesex County Road 22 and Lambton County Road 22. It began at Highway 7 and Highway 79 north of Watford and proceeded 46.0 kilometres (28.6 mi) east to Highway 4 in the north end of London. Between those two points, it passed through the small communities of Wisbeach, Dejong, Adelaide, Wrightmans Corners, Hickory Corner, Poplar Hill, Lobo, and Melrose. The highway was located within Lambton County, Middlesex County, and the city of London, and it followed the historic Egremont Road

Highway 22 was designated in 1927 to provide a route between Sarnia and London; until then, the only provincial highway connection between the two cities was a circuitous route via Highway 7 and Highway 4 through Parkhill and Elginfield. The original routing of Highway 22 passed through Watford and Strathroy until a more direct route was established in 1947. The function of Highway 22 was largely supplanted by the completion of Highway 402 throughout the 1970s. Accordingly, it was decommissioned and turned over to local jurisdiction in 1997 and 1998.

== Route description ==
Highway 22 was a 46.0 km (28.6 mi) highway that connected Highway 7 north of Watford with Highway 4 in London; Highway 7 continued west to Sarnia. The route was located within Lambton County, Middlesex County and the city of London. Since being decommissioned in 1998, most of the former route has been known as County Road 22, or Fanshawe Park Road within London; it is two lanes wide except east of Hyde Park Road in London, where it is four lanes wide. Outside London, the former route is surrounded almost exclusively by sprawling farmland outside of the few small communities through which it passes.

Highway 22 began at the intersection of Highway 7 and Highway 79 near Wisbeach — the east of two intersections between those highways — from which it proceeded east along the historic Egremont road. The first 3.7 km (2.3 mi) were located in Lambton County, and this segment is now known as Lambton County Road 22. East of the Lambton–Middlesex boundary at Sexton Road, which also serves as the municipal boundary between Warwick and Adelaide Metcalfe, it is known as Middlesex County Road 22. Continuing in a straight line, it passed through the hamlet of Adelaide before reaching Highway 81, now known as Middlesex County Road 81, at Wrightmans Corners, just north of Strathroy.

At Hickory Corner (at one time an established village known as Amiens), the former route of Highway 22 enters the municipality of Middlesex Centre, with the survey grid turning approximately 45°, relative to Adelaide Metcalfe. It presses through farmland at an oblique angle to lot lines, travelling through the communities of Poplar Hill, Lobo and Melrose. East of Melrose, Egremont Drive curves northeast onto the alignment of Fanshawe Park Road, taking on that name at Denfield Road. Although the city limits of London now lie 0.6 km (0.37 mi) east of Denfield Road, they were at Derwent Road in the early 1990s.

Within the present limits of London, the former route of Highway 22 briefly travels through farmland before reaching the rural–urban fringe of the city near Hyde Park Road. It progressively becomes entrenched between subdivisions as it continues northeast. Beyond Wonderland Road, the former route crosses Medway Creek. Immediately prior to being decommissioned, Highway 22 ended at Derwent Road, midway between Wonderland Road and Highway 4 (Richmond Street). However, until the early 1990s, it continued along Fanshawe Park Road as far as Highbury Avenue.

== History ==
=== Egremont Road ===
Early European settlement in southwestern Ontario was predominantly focused along the shores of Lake Erie, as water-based routes were the principal means of transportation at the time. However, the War of 1812 made evident the need for overland roads. The Long Woods Purchase and the Huron Tract Purchase, in 1819 and 1833 respectively, opened the lands west of London to settlement. Sir John Colborne, the lieutenant governor of Upper Canada in the 1830s, ordered a survey of the lands as well as a road from London to Lake Huron on the shortest line between the two. This line was named in honour of George Wyndham, 3rd Earl of Egremont, who was encouraging emigration to the area from England. The surveying itself was carried out by Peter Carroll under the supervision of Mahlon Burwell in 1831 and 1832.

A town site named Errol was laid out at the Lake Huron end of the line. While it was expected that Errol would quickly grow in to a thriving port, Sarnia did instead due largely in part to politician and businessman Malcolm Cameron. Cameron advocated for the construction of the London Line, along which Watford and Strathroy were established. By 1850, Errol was abandoned and the London Line was the main thoroughfare between London and the border at Sarnia.

Highway 7 and Highway 4 formed the only provincial route between Sarnia and London until Highway 22 was designated.

=== Provincial highway ===
When Ontario's Department of Public Highways (DPHO) first established a network of provincial highways on February 26, 1920, in order to be eligible for federal funding, it did not provide for a direct route between Sarnia and London. While unimproved roads crisscrossed the intermediate farmland, the only provincial connection between the two cities was a circuitous route along what would become Highway 7 and Highway 4. That route travelled north from Warwick through Arkona, east through Parkhill and Alisa Craig to Elginfield, then south to London. Following the numbering of provincially-maintained roads in the summer of 1925, the DPHO began to assume new routes to complement the fifteen existing highways (numbered 2 through 17, excluding 13). Among these was the Sarnia–London Highway, a route that encompassed a portion of Highway 7, as well as a new highway through Watford and Strathroy that would be designated as Highway 22. On July 2, 1927, 40.4 km (25.1 mi) of roads within Middlesex County were taken over, or assumed, by the DPHO. A further 12.8 km (8.0 mi) of roads within Lambton County were assumed eleven days later on July 13.

Paving operations on the Sarnia–London Highway in 1927

While initially unpaved, the DPHO immediately set forth to pave the entire route. Expecting the work to be carried out gradually over several years, paving of 16 km (10 mi) of Highway 7 east from Reeces Corners began June 15, 1927. Progress was much faster than anticipated, and by the end of that month the contractor had been ordered to continue paving as much as possible throughout the remainder of the construction season. Paving began simultaneously at the London end of the route. By the end of the 1927 work was completed west from Hyde Park Road to the community of Lobo, nearly 13 km (8 mi). Another 8 km (5 mi) from Lobo to Hickory Corner was paved in 1928. A 35 km (22 mi) segment of paving was completed on October 28, 1929, uniting the pavement west of Warwick with Hickory Corner. Minister of Highways George S. Henry cut a ribbon at a ceremony in Strathroy that day to officially open the paved Sarnia–London Highway. Despite this, a 4.9 km (3.0 mi) section of Highway 22 between Hyde Park Road and Highway 4 remained unpaved. This final segment was paved in 1930. That year also saw the DPHO renamed as the Department of Highways (DHO) and the introduction of The King's Highway title.

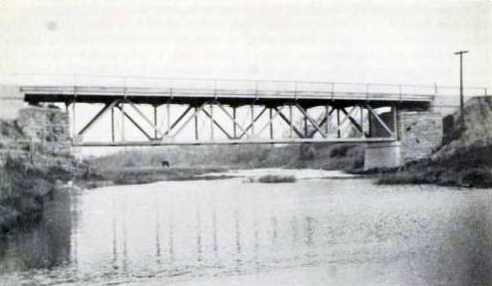
Newly built Masonville Bridge in London in 1929

The chosen route for Highway 22 was approximately 8 km (5 mi) longer than the more direct routing along Egremont Road. While some groups advocated the province instead take over the 22.7 km (14 mi) Sarnia Gravel Road between Wisbeach and Hickory Corner as the Sarnia–London highway, the towns of Watford and Strathroy successfully petitioned for the route to pass through them instead. The mindset of the time was that bypassing the communities would bring about their demise and that tourists would be better served by having frequent access to services and accommodations. By the 1940s this mentality had flipped to one in which bypasses reduced congestion and accidents by removing through traffic from business areas. On April 16, 1947, the DHO took control of Egremont Road with the intention of reducing the distance between Sarnia and London.

The Official Ontario Road Map indicates that Highway 22 continued south along Highway 4 to Highway 2 (Dundas Street) in downtown London from 1940 until 1972, after which it is shown continuing along Fanshawe Park Road to Highway 126 (Highbury Avenue).

=== Downloads ===
Planning for the route that would become Highway 402 began following the completion of the Blue Water Bridge in 1938. A divided highway was constructed through Sarnia following World War II; it was completed and designated in 1953. The DHO announced its intent to extend the route to Highway 401 in 1957. However, while some preliminary work began in the early 1960s, it would take until 1968 for a preferred route to be announced, and until 1972 for construction to begin. Work was carried out through the remainder of the 1970s, and the freeway was completed and ceremonially opened in late 1982. Now largely rendered redundant by the parallel freeway, the route of Highway 22 was gradually decommissioned and transferred to county and municipal jurisdiction throughout the 1990s.

The London–Middlesex Act, passed December 10, 1992, expanded the municipal boundaries of the City of London effective January 1, 1993. The 5.5 km (3.4 mi) section of Highway 22 between Derwent Road (the former boundary) and 600 m (0.37 mi) east of Denfield Road was consequently transferred to the City of London. As part of a series of budget cuts initiated by premier Mike Harris under his Common Sense Revolution platform, a 16.5 km (10.3 mi) section of the route between the Highway 7/79 junction north of Watford and the Highway 81 junction north of Strathroy was transferred to Lambton and Middlesex counties on April 1, 1997. This was followed up several months later by the transfer of the remaining 22.3 km (13.9 mi) east of Highway 81 to the London boundary on January 1, 1998. Highway 22 was removed from the provincial highway system as a result of these transfers. Today it is known as County Road 22, Egremont Drive and Fanshawe Park Road. Despite Lambton County designating County Road 22 along London Line between Highway 40 in Sarnia and the county boundary east of Wisbeach, Highway 22 never continued west of Watford.

== Major intersections ==
The following table lists the major junctions along Highway 22, as noted by the Ministry of Transportation of Ontario.

| Division | Location | km | mi | Destinations | Notes |
|---|---|---|---|---|---|
| Lambton | Warwick | 0.0 | 0.0 | Highway 7 / Highway 79 (Arkona Road) – Arkona | |
| Middlesex | Adelaide Metcalfe | 7.4 | 4.6 | County Road 6 (Kerwood Road) – Parkhill | |
| Middlesex | Adelaide Metcalfe | 16.5 | 10.3 | Highway 81 (Centre Road) – Strathroy, Parkhill | |
| Middlesex | Adelaide Metcalfe – Strathroy-Caradoc – Middlesex Centre boundary | 22.7 | 14.1 | County Road 39 (Hickory Drive) | |
| Middlesex | Middlesex Centre | 26.2 | 16.3 | County Road 16 (Ilderton Road) – Ilderton | |
| Middlesex | Middlesex Centre | 33.8 | 21.0 | County Road 17 (Nairn Road) – Lobo | |
| London | | 41.0 | 25.5 | Hyde Park Road – Ilderton | |
| London | | 43.6 | 27.1 | Wonderland Road | |
| London | | 44.7 | 27.8 | | Beginning of London Connecting Link agreement |
| London | | 46.0 | 28.6 | Highway 4 – London | End of London Connecting Link agreement |
1.000 mi = 1.609 km; 1.000 km = 0.621 mi
