= Ontario Highway 402 =

Controlled-access highway in Ontario

Highway 402
- Highway 402 highlighted in red

Route information
- Maintained by Ministry of Transportation of Ontario
- Length: 102.5 km (63.7 mi)
- History: Planned: 1938; Designated: 1953; Completed: 1982

Major junctions
- West end: I-69 / I-94 at the U.S. border on the Blue Water Bridge in Point Edward
- Highway 40 – Sarnia; Highway 21 – Warwick; Highway 4 – London
- East end: Highway 401 – London

Location
- Country: Canada
- Province: Ontario
- Counties: Lambton, Middlesex
- Major cities: Sarnia, London

Highway system
- Ontario provincial highways; Current; Former; 400-series
← Highway 401	→ Highway 403

King's Highway 402, commonly referred to as Highway 402 and historically as the Blue Water Bridge Approach, is a 400-series highway in the Canadian province of Ontario that runs from the Blue Water Bridge international crossing near Sarnia to Highway 401 in London. It is one of multiple trade links between Ontario and the Midwestern United States. It is four lanes for much of its length, though the approach to the Blue Water Bridge is six lanes.

Although Highway 402 was one of the original 400-series highways when it was designated in 1953, the freeway originally merged into Highway 7 near the present Highway 40 interchange in what was, at the time, Sarnia Township. In 1972, construction began to extend Highway 402 from Sarnia to Highway 401 near London thus creating a bypass to Highway 7; construction took over a decade. The final section of the extension, between Highway 81 and Highway 2, opened to traffic in 1982. The removal of an intersection at Front Street in Sarnia made the entire route a controlled-access highway.

Motorists crossing into Michigan at the western end have direct access to Interstate 69 (I-69) and Interstate 94 (I-94) into Port Huron; motorists crossing onto the Canadian side from the east end of I-69 and I-94 have access to Toronto via Highway 401, and onwards to Montreal via A-20 in Quebec.

The speed limit is 110 km/h (68 mph). The route is patrolled by the Ontario Provincial Police (OPP) and maintained by the Ministry of Transportation of Ontario (MTO).

== Route description ==
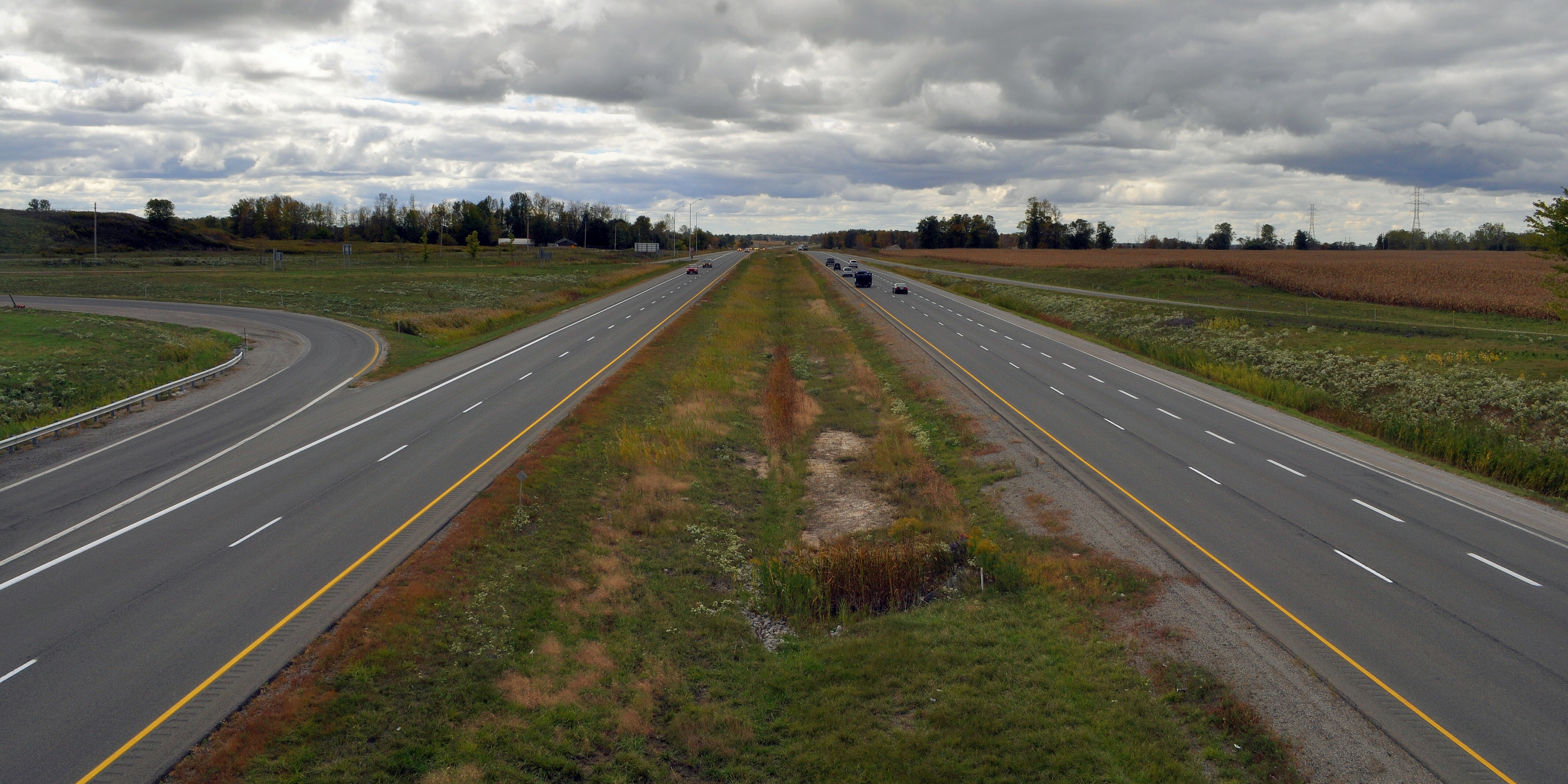
Highway 402 has a wide grass median separating the carriageways for the majority of its length.

Highway 402 begins on the Canadian side of the Blue Water Bridge. Across the St. Clair River, Highway 402 continues in Michigan as I-69 and I-94. The twin bridge crossing has six lanes of traffic and non-stop freeway access. This provides a quicker route than the busier Ambassador Bridge crossing in Windsor, which features over ten traffic lights on Highway 3 leading to the four-lane bridge, a situation recently rectified after the Gordie Howe International Bridge was opened in late July 2026. (Note: However, construction of a new route known as the Rt Hon. Herb Gray Parkway began in August 2011; it will provide a direct freeway connection into Detroit via the Gordie Howe International Bridge by 2024.) Although Highway 402 passes through Sarnia, it is not intended to operate as a commuter highway; at Highway 40 and westward all ramps leading to the westbound lanes of the freeway were originally signed as "Bridge To U.S.A." without reference to Highway 402, though these have been replaced in the early 2000s with signs saying "402 West Bridge To U.S.A.".

After descending over the village of Point Edward and passing through a customs plaza, the freeway curves as it crosses Front Street (former Highway 40B) and a former railway line. Running north of the former Holmes Foundry (closed in 1988 by owner Chrysler), the route then becomes parallel to and north of Exmouth Street as it dives under the Christina Street overpass and enters the City of Sarnia.

East of the Murphy Road underpass, the freeway curves to the northeast to bypass its original alignment. It crosses the Rapids Parkway and the Howard Watson Nature Trail, the latter being a mixed-use recreational trail that was converted from a Canadian National Railway (CNR) line in 1988. The highway curves back to its east–west orientation at an interchange with Highway 40 (Modeland Road). It passes south of Sarnia Chris Hadfield Airport before exiting the city limits at Mandaumin Road (Lambton Road 26).

Now parallel and north of London Line, the former route of Highway 7 (the predecessor route between Sarnia and London), the freeway jogs north to travel along the back lot line of farmland fronting London Line and the concession road north of Highway 402. The highway split at least one farm in half during its construction, with the family’s barn being burned down to make way for the construction. The freeway passes by a truck inspection station (eastbound traffic only) and truck rest area (westbound traffic only, formerly a truck inspection station) before being crossed by Camlachie Road. It meets Lambton County Road 21 (Oil Heritage Road), the northern terminus of the Oil Heritage Route, north of the town of Wyoming. The county road is also a former southern extension of Highway 21, which itself begins as Forest Road 9.3 kilometres (5.8 mi) to the east. Highway 21 is also known as the Bluewater Route, as most of its length is parallel to the shore of Lake Huron.

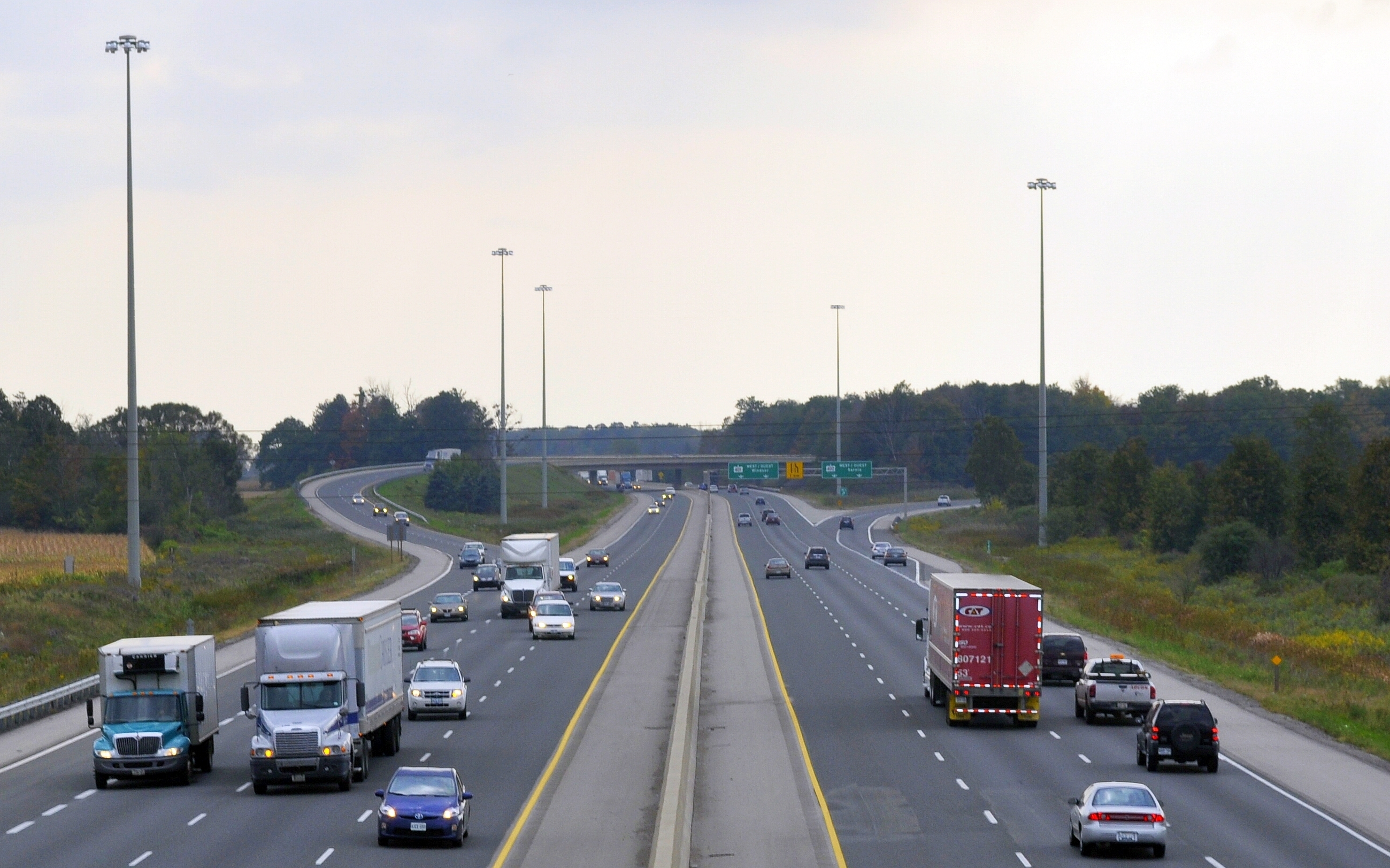
The eastern terminus of Highway 402 with Highway 401 in London

After passing an interchange with Forest Road, the freeway is crossed by London Line and momentarily diverges from its straight alignment to dip south of Warwick. It continues 25 kilometres (16 mi) east through large patches of farmland, then meets with Middlesex County Road 81 (Victoria Street) at an interchange as it passes north of Strathroy. Shortly thereafter, it curves to the southeast and zig-zags towards London, bisecting farms and dividing woodlands. The freeway passes to the west of the town of Delaware and curves east. It enters London and meets interchanges with Highway 4 south of Lambeth, and finally with Wonderland Road before merging into Highway 401. Access to westbound and from eastbound Highway 401 is provided via Highway 4 or Wonderland Road.

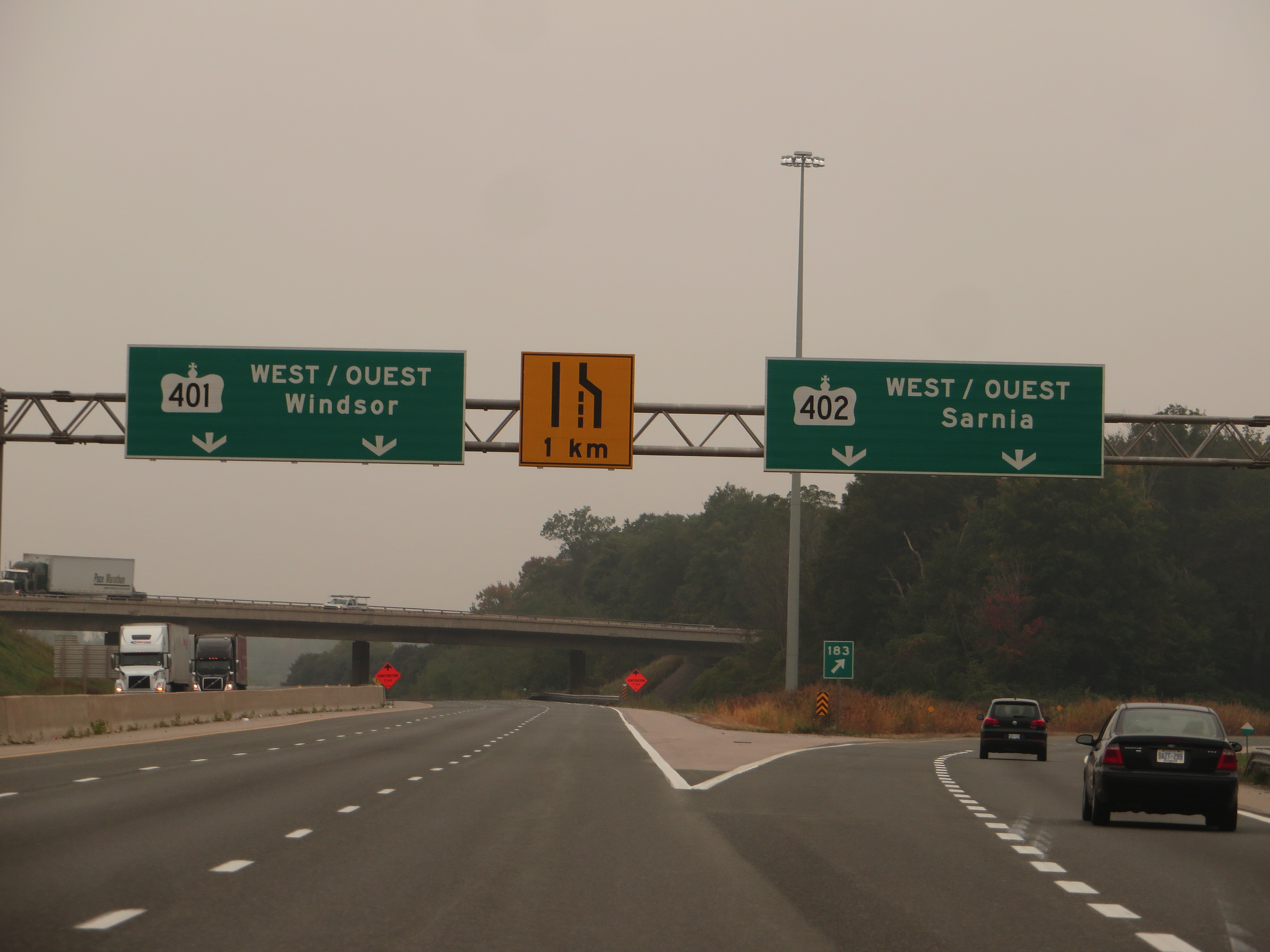
The start of Highway 402 westbound as it splits off from Highway 401.

The freeway generally uses Parclo A2 and Parclo B2 designs for interchanges. Exceptions include the Front Street interchange in Sarnia, which is a hybrid of a diamond and Parclo B2 interchange (previously a Parclo AB2 until the mid-2000s), and the Highway 40 interchange which is a Parclo B-4. There is presently no interchange using the full six ramp Parclo A4 layout (a common design on other Ontario freeways) on the entirety of Highway 402; although several interchanges do have five ramps, while the junction with Indian Road was previously a Parclo A4 until the directional ramp in the NW quadrant was removed and replaced with a signalized left turn in the late 1990s.

== History ==
Planning for the route that would become Highway 402 began following the completion of the Blue Water Bridge in 1938. A divided highway was constructed through Sarnia following World War II; it was completed and designated in 1953. The Department of Highways announced its intent to extend the route to Highway 401 in 1957. However, while some preliminary work began in the early 1960s, it would take until 1968 for a preferred route to be announced, and until 1972 for construction to begin. Work was carried out through the remainder of the 1970s, and the freeway was completed and ceremonially opened in late 1982. Since completion as a four-lane route, expansion work has been concentrated on the portion of the freeway in Sarnia approaching the border crossing.

Aerial view of Highway 402 passing through Sarnia; the Blue Water Bridge is visible. Lake Huron, to the upper right, is largely covered in ice.

=== Original route ===
Highway 402 is one of the original 400-series highways. It was numbered in 1953, a year after Highway 400 and Highway 401. The short 6.1-kilometre (3.8 mi) dual highway was built as an approach to the Blue Water Bridge, which itself opened to traffic October 10, 1938. As such, the highway was named the Blue Water Bridge Approach. Construction began in 1939. However, like many other road projects, World War II halted construction. In 1947 a new survey was undertaken; construction resumed by 1952. The approach road was opened in 1953, at which point the route was designated Highway 402. It featured an interchange with Christina Street and at-grade intersections with Front Street, Indian Road and Modeland Road (the Highway 40 Sarnia bypass); after Modeland Road the route continued to London as Highway 7.

=== Extension to London ===
Ultimately, Highway 402 was designated with the intent of extending it to Highway 401. This was formally announced by the Department of Highways in late 1957. Construction on a new grade-separated intersection with Modeland Road began in 1963 and opened in 1964, although as before Highway 402 still continued eastward as Highway 7. On February 28, 1968, a 98-kilometre (61 mi) extension towards London was officially announced by Minister of Highways George Gomme. It was decided to construct the extension on a new right-of-way, as had been done with most freeways constructed after Highway 400. East of the Murphy Road overpass, Highway 402 was re-aligned to bypass the interchange with Highway 40 constructed in 1964; Exmouth Street was redirected to connect with Highway 7 (London Line) at that junction, and Quinn Street now follows the former routing of Highway 402. For the new Highway 402, an overpass crossing was required with the then-CNR line (decommissioned in 1988 and converted to the Howard Watson Nature Trail) and a Parclo B4 interchange with the newly twinned Highway 40 just north of the 1964 interchange. Construction east of Highway 40 began in 1972.

Highway 402 facing east towards the Modeland Road intersection in 1959. In the distance beyond the intersection, the two carriageways converge into Highway 7. This intersection was reconstructed as an interchange by 1963, but then bypassed by a new alignment of Highway 402 in the 1970s, and subsequently redesignated as London Line which continues westward as Exmouth Street.

Under two construction contracts, construction of 23.2 kilometres (14.4 mi) of Highway 402 began near Highway 7 in 1974. A third contract to bridge the gap between that project and Sarnia was awarded in 1975. On October 13, 1978, Highway 402 was opened to traffic between Highway 40 and Highway 21. By the end of that year, construction was progressing on the section between Highway 21 and Highway 81 near Strathroy, as well as on the section connecting Highway 2 with Highway 401. The section between Highway 21 and Highway 81 north of Strathroy was the next to be completed; it was opened to traffic on November 26, 1979. On November 17, 1981, the section between London and Delaware was completed, including the interchange at Highway 401. It forced westbound drivers to exit at Longwoods Road (Highway 2). Construction was already underway on the final section between Strathroy and Delaware at this point.

The opening of the section between Highways 2 and 81 completed Highway 402 from London to the Blue Water Bridge. In addition, the removal of the Front Street intersection in Sarnia made the entire route a controlled-access highway. Both were completed in time for the official opening in Sarnia on November 10, 1982.

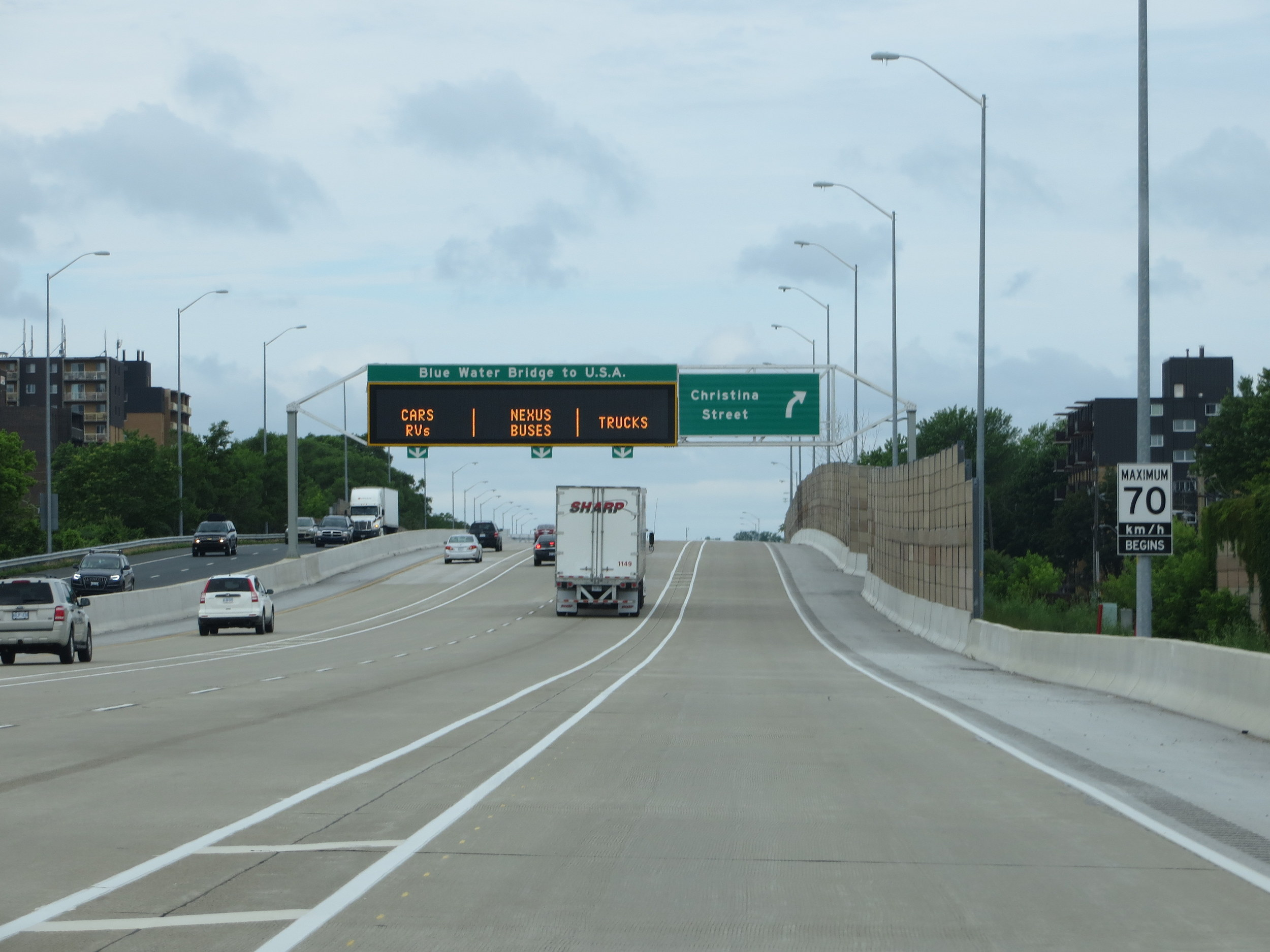
Highway 402 westbound in Sarnia; lanes are separated to split local traffic from international/NEXUS traffic bound for the Blue Water Bridge. This allows the highway to function locally during long border delays.

In 1997, noise barriers were erected upon both sides of the highway between Colborne Road to just east of the Howard Watson Trail. At the Indian Road interchange, the directional ramp in the NW quadrant was removed and replaced with a signalized left turn for the NE quadrant loop ramp, enabling a continuous noise barrier to be placed in place of the former directional ramp. However, the Sarnia-Lambton Chamber of Commerce was concerned that the new noise barriers would cause travelers to overlook the city. A partnership was formed between the municipality and the Ontario Ministry of Transportation to make additional aesthetic improvements to the highway corridor within the city that would be funded by the community, including a "City of Sarnia" landscaped sign that was completed in 2001.

=== Widening and upgrades ===
In 2007, the southern ramps of the Front Street interchange were realigned. It was originally opened in 1982 as a parclo AB2 (folded diamond) configuration, since Highway 402 needed to cross a railway line as well as Front Street; however the railway has since been removed by the early 1990s, allowing a new on-ramp to Highway 402 eastbound to be built in the SE quadrant. For the overpass carrying eastbound highway traffic, the acceleration lane which previously served the now-removed loop ramp in the SW quadrant was instead allocated to a new on-ramp from the Canada Border Services Agency secondary inspection; previously transport trucks exiting the customs plaza had to make a right-turn from Marina Road to the highway which caused considerable congestion.

On Monday, December 13, 2010, a whiteout caused by lake-effect snow squalls left an 80-kilometre (50 mi) stretch of Highway 402 closed for several days. Lambton County officials declared a state of emergency. Although the entire distance between Sarnia and London is subject to occasional snow squalls and whiteout conditions, they usually dissipate or move in less than a day. The exceptional conditions at that time were caused by a snow squall which remained stationary over several days, dropping up to two metres (6 ft) of snow in some parts of the area. Defence Minister Peter MacKay sent two Canadian Forces Griffon helicopters and a C-130 Hercules to Sarnia to aid in the search-and-rescue efforts. The hospitality of locals in providing shelter for stranded motorists was the primary focus of local media coverage. The highway was reopened to traffic on the morning of December 16. A single death was reported; a man succumbed to hypothermia on a nearby county road.

Highway 402 was widened in the Sarnia area from four to six lanes due to extensive traffic backups from the bridge crossing towards the USA; the westbound lanes received two additional lanes for a total of four, while eastbound capacity remains unchanged at two lanes, with the grass median separated both directions being replaced by an Ontario tall-wall concrete barrier. The new four-lane roadway is divided into specific lanes for cars, trucks, local traffic, and NEXUS card holders. The new lanes begin just before the Murphy Road overpass with a local lane breaking away for interchange access; all travellers wishing to exit the highway from this point must be travelling in this lane. Construction began August 4, 2009, between the Blue Water Bridge and Lambton County Road 26 (Mandaumin Road) and included the widening of the existing Colborne Road and Front Street underpasses. The existing Christina Street bridge was replaced, plus the ramps in the northeast quadrant were modified with a signalized intersection to Lite Street, allowing full exit/entry to the westbound lanes. The widening project was completed by the end of 2012. Between 2004 and 2013, the speed limit along the westbound lanes from Airport Road westward was reduced from the standard 100 kilometres per hour (60 mph). However, following the reconstruction, the speed limit was raised between Indian Road and Airport Road on June 20, 2013.

On January 5, 2013, a temporary vehicular roadblock was created at the Blue Water Bridge as part of the "Idle No More" protests by First Nations groups. The blockade was known in advance and was planned to occur during the noon hour. Lambton OPP monitored the protest by walking alongside the protesters. Traffic resumed flowing normally by 1:30 p.m. While Highway 402 itself was not closed, the protest did back up traffic onto the highway causing congestion in the areas of Front Street and Christina Street. Later that year, another protest was held west of Strathroy on October 19, advocating against wind turbine construction. The rolling protest of about 150 vehicles, including farm equipment, was monitored by the OPP and required intermittent ramp closures to the westbound lanes.

On November 23, 2015, the Indian Road overpass was damaged by a flatbed trailer carrying an over-height load. The eastbound lanes of the highway were closed for 60 hours, while the girders damaged in the impact had to be removed, while the overpass reopened for Indian Road traffic which was reduced to two lanes for the next few months. The overpass was repaired by May 2016 at a cost of $554,000 (overall damage of $3 million). The trucking company, under the Highway Traffic Act, was held liable and had to compensate the Ministry of Transportation of Ontario for the repair costs.

The MTO rehabilitated the Howard Watson Nature Trail underpasses (originally a Canadian National Railway (CNR) line until 1988) in 2025. In conjunction with the above project, using the existing right-of-way afforded by the Highway 402 crossing, the City of Sarnia extended The Rapids Parkway southwards along the Howard Watson Nature Trail from Sandpiper Drive to Exmouth Street, which opened in November 2025. This extension directly connects the Rapids Parkway residential subdivision (originally farmland until schools were built there in the mid-1990s) to shopping plazas near Lambton Mall, relieving traffic congestion which otherwise had to use Modeland Road and London Line. The Rapids Parkway is the first new surface street crossing Highway 402 since the latter opened in 1982.

The Blue Water Bridge in Sarnia became the busiest Canada-U.S. trade corridor since 2025, surpassing Windsor due to the much higher tolls for the Ambassador Bridge, as well as the Blue Water Bridge having non-interrupted freeway access on both sides. The Blue Water Bridge continued its lead into 2026, due to delays in opening the Gordie Howe International Bridge which is intended as a bypass with direct freeway access to the Ambassador Bridge, although construction for the Gordie Howe bridge was substantially completed in early 2026. For every month in 2025, the Blue Water Bridge surpassed the Ambassador Bridge in commercial truck traffic, with 2.1 million trips at Sarnia versus 1.9 million at Windsor, according to data from the Bridge and Tunnel Operators Association.

== Exit list ==
The following table lists the major junctions along Highway 402, as noted by the Ministry of Transportation of Ontario.

Division	Location	km	mi	Exit	Destinations	Notes
St. Clair River; Canada–United States border		0.0	0.0	–	I-94 west / I-69 west – Detroit, Flint	Continuation into Michigan
St. Clair River; Canada–United States border		0.0	0.0	Blue Water Bridge (tolled)		
Lambton	Point Edward	0.0	0.0	Port Huron–Sarnia Border Crossing		
Lambton	Point Edward	0.7	0.43	1	Front Street	Formerly Highway 40B; reconfigured from a Parclo AB in the mid-2000s
Lambton	Point Edward–Sarnia boundary	1.2	0.75	2	Christina Street	No eastbound exit; access to Christina Street South from the westbound exit opened in 2012. A signalised intersection was added allowing full exit/entry to the westbound lanes.
Lambton	Sarnia	3.0	1.9	3	County Road 29 (Indian Road)	Eastbound exits to Exmouth Street, about 200 m (660 ft) west of Indian Road
Lambton	Sarnia	5.7	3.5	6	Highway 40 south / County Road 27 north (Modeland Road) – Chatham	
Lambton	Sarnia	8.5	5.3	9	Airport Road	Access to Sarnia Chris Hadfield Airport. Directional ramp from Airport Road southbound to westbound added in 2002.
Lambton	Sarnia–Plympton-Wyoming boundary	15.2	9.4	15	County Road 26 (Mandaumin Road)	
Lambton	Plympton-Wyoming	24.6	15.3	25	County Road 21 south / County Road 30 north (Oil Heritage Road) – Wyoming, Petrolla	Formerly Highway 21 south; former western end of Highway 21 concurrency
Lambton	Plympton-Wyoming–Warwick boundary	34.0	21.1	34	Highway 21 north / County Road 8 south (Lambton Road) – Forest, Grand Bend	Former eastern end of Highway 21 concurrency
Lambton	Warwick	44.3	27.5	44	County Road 79 (Nauvoo Road) – Watford, Arkona	Formerly Highway 79
Middlesex	Adelaide Metcalfe	55.5	34.5	56	County Road 6 (Kerwood Road) – Kerwood	
Middlesex	Adelaide Metcalfe	64.8	40.3	65	County Road 81 (Centre Road) – Parkhill, Strathroy	Formerly Highway 81
Middlesex	Adelaide Metcalfe–Strathroy-Caradoc boundary	69.0	42.9	69	County Road 39 (Hickory Drive) – Strathroy	
Middlesex	Strathroy-Caradoc	81.6	50.7	82	County Road 14 (Glendon Drive) – Mount Brydges, Komoka	Access to Parkhouse Drive
Middlesex	Strathroy-Caradoc	85.5	53.1	86	County Road 2 (Longwoods Road) – Melbourne, Delaware	Formerly Highway 2; to County Road 81
London		97.6	60.6	98	Colonel Talbot Road – St. Thomas	Formerly Highway 4
London		99.8	62.0	100	Highway 4 (Wonderland Road)	Access to 401 Westbound via Wonderland Road
London		102.5	63.7	103	Highway 401 east – Toronto	Eastbound exit to Highway 401 east; westbound entrance from Highway 401 west; Highway 401 exit 183
1.000 mi = 1.609 km; 1.000 km = 0.621 mi: Incomplete access; Tolled; Route transition
