= Sydenham River (Ontario) =

There are two Sydenham Rivers in Ontario.

- The Sydenham River (Lake Huron) flows north from Williams Lake and falls over the Niagara Escarpment, through the city of Owen Sound and into Georgian Bay.
- The Sydenham River (Lake Saint Clair) flows west and south from near London, emptying into Lake St. Clair at Wallaceburg.
