= Glen Rae, Ontario =

Former community in Ontario, Canada

Coordinates: 42°49′01″N 82°02′08″W

Glen Rae is a community in the township of Enniskillen, Ontario that was named after John Rae.

== History ==
Rae established a stave mill four and a half miles East of Oil City next to the Canadian Southern Railroad line in the late 1880s. On June 6, 1887 the post office of Glen Rae was established and Sebastian Ray is recorded as the first Postmaster of ten more that would follow him in this post. It is unclear if the stave mill owner John Rae, and Sebastian Ray, are one and the same, as no record can be found to clarify this. The eleventh and last Postmaster recorded at Glen Rae was Harry Moore. Moore was appointed to the post on April 11, 1946. The post office stamped its last letter and officially closed January 30, 1960.

In 1904 the Canadian Southern Railroad was taken over by the Michigan Central Railroad and in 1929 by the New York Central Railway. Glen Rae became a hub for the local farm community with its post office, general store, and train station. West of the store a grain and sugar beet transferring station was built on a siding off the main line, and remained until the late 1940s. The passenger train scheduled stops lasted until 1950 when demand for passenger service dropped sharply due to automobile use.

In 1960 Glen Rae succumbed to the fate of many small community centers when rail was no longer important for travel or the shipping of farm goods. The closing of the train station in the early 1950s was followed by the closing of the post office in 1960. In 1962 the railroad tracks were lifted, and finally in the early 1970s the store closed and the buildings and acreage was sold off. Today, all that remains is a driveway culvert in the drainage ditch on the East side of Oakdale Road, and the faint footprint of old foundations in a farm field. The old rail bed is now the right of way for a high voltage power line.
