= Delaware, Ontario =

Delaware
- Community
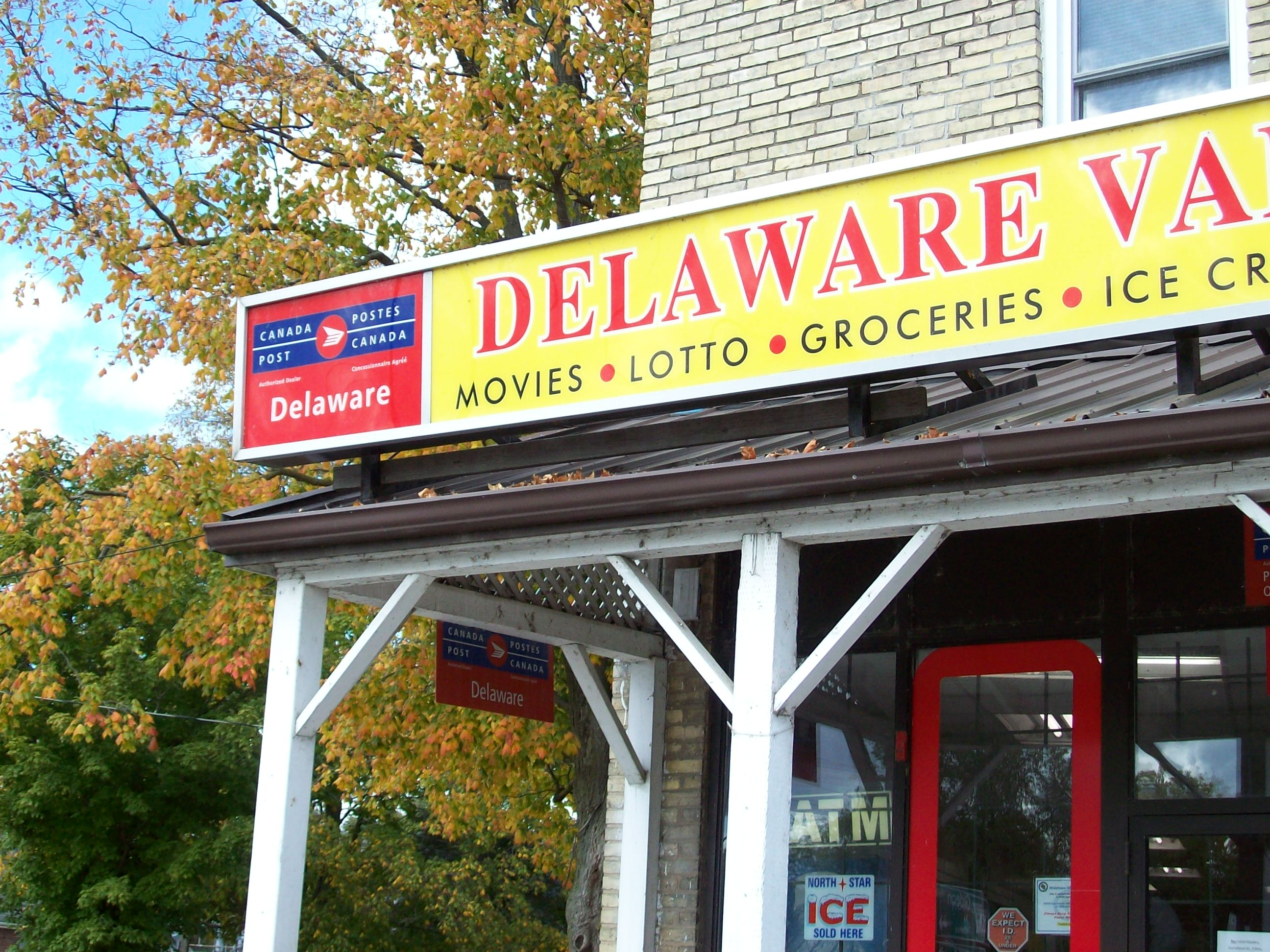

- Location within Ontario
- Coordinates: 42°54′30″N 81°25′0″W
- Country: Canada
- Province: Ontario
- County: Middlesex County
- Municipality: Middlesex Centre

Area
  - Total: 97.24 km^{2} (37.54 sq mi)

Population
  - Total: 2,521
  - Density: 25.93/km^{2} (67.15/sq mi)
- Time zone: UTC-5 (EST)
  - Summer (DST): UTC-4 (EDT)
- Postal code: N0L 1E0

Delaware, Ontario is a community located about 10 kilometres (6.2 mi) west of and outside of London, Ontario, within Middlesex County. Delaware straddles the Thames River. Delaware is accessed by Highway 2 linking London and Chatham, while the Highway 402 links to Sarnia along with Port Huron and Toronto.

== Education ==
Delaware has two elementary schools, Delaware Central Public School (Thames Valley District School Board), and Our Lady of Lourdes (London District Catholic School Board). Delaware Central (DCPS) has about 175 students, while Our Lady of Lourdes has approximately 350. In the fall of 2011, Our Lady of Lourdes (OLOL) moved to a new facility on Wellington Street, in part this was due to the school being flooded constantly from the nearby creek. After the departure of OLOL the private school Riverbend Academy acquired the property. Riverbend Academy is a co-ed elementary and secondary school offering enrollment from Junior Kindergarten to Grade 12.

== Geography ==
Delaware is situated in the Thames River Valley, although it has now expanded over the top of the valley ridge. Most of the area surrounding Delaware is made up of forests and floodplain areas. Corn, soybeans and tobacco are farmed extensively in the area around Delaware, as well as inside the town limits in some areas. Delaware has undergone modest growth in housing over the last 30 years, with the developed area nearly doubling in that time.

Many of the buildings in the heart of Delaware are known to be well into their second century. For example, the fine brick house on the north brow of Wellington St. was built in 1842 by the Tiffanys. Buildings in the village still stand that are seen in Civil War era photographs. These include the building that is now Delaware Variety as well as the antique shop across the street (now the Delaware Pharmacy). Belvoir Manor is a private home that was at one point a seminary and a private school for boys, and at one point was damaged by fire. Belvoir was originally built by Dean Tiffany in 1859 and named Maple Grove, passing in turn to the Gibson family who renamed it Belvoir and pronounced it Beever, then to the Little family, who after the death of Senator Little sold it to the Roman Catholic Church. Belvoir is now a privately owned farm.

== Tourism and entertainment ==
Delaware boasts a number of tourist destinations despite its small size. Delaware Speedway is a half-mile paved race track that is one of the oldest in Canada. The track hosts stock car racing every Friday night during the summer, as well as several Saturday and Sunday race features. The track has also hosted major concert events in the past including I Mother Earth and Matthew Good.

The Longwoods Road Conservation Area features Skah-Nah-Doht, a recreated Iroquoian village complete with longhouses and tours, as well as a museum featuring exhibits of Iroquoian culture and archaeological artifacts. The park hosts a yearly native festival as well as a re-enactment of the Battle of Longwoods.
