= Warwick, Ontario =

Warwick
- Township (lower-tier)
- Township of Warwick
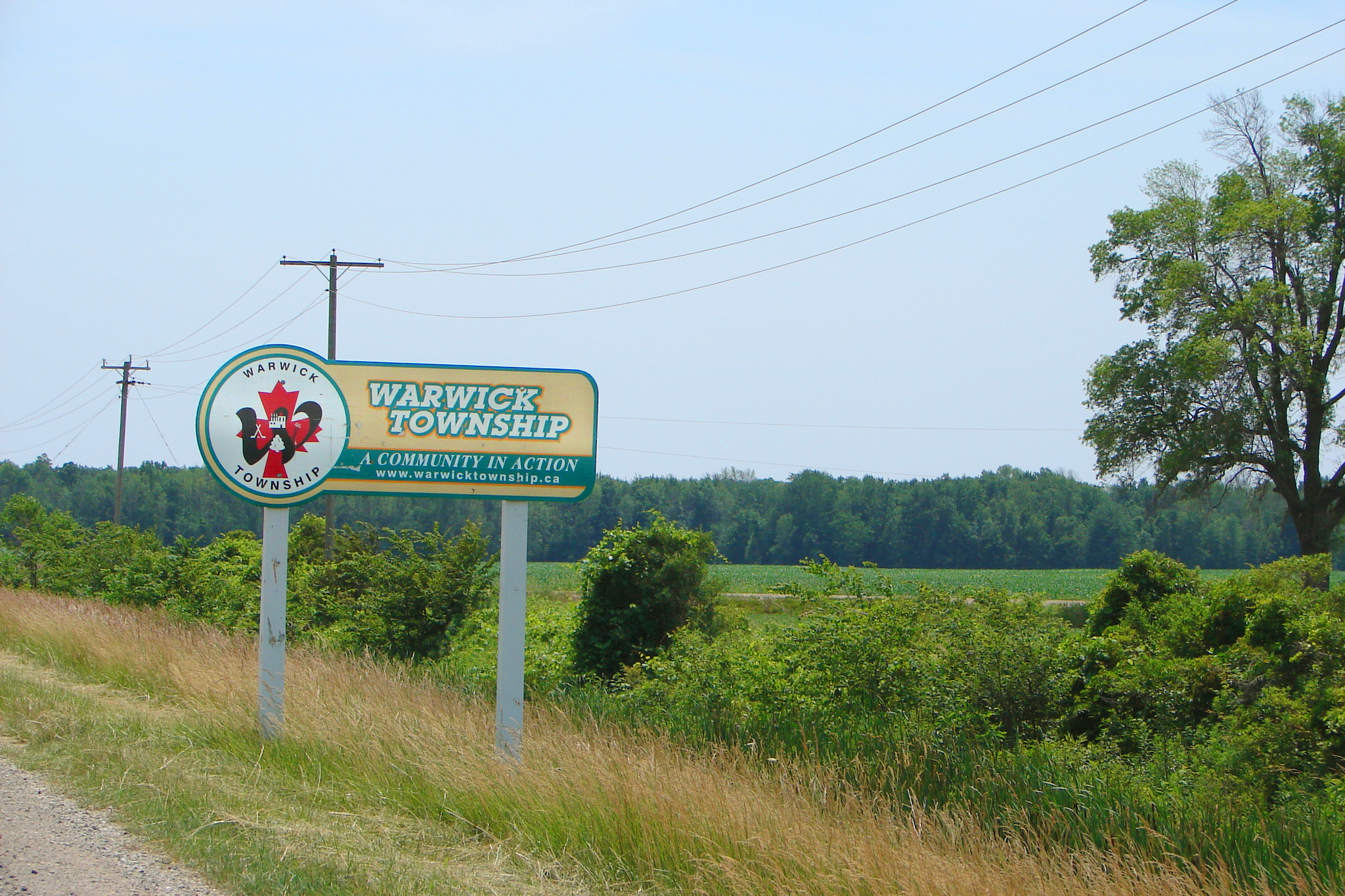

- Location within Lambton County Location within Southern Ontario
- Coordinates: 43°00′N 81°53.5′W
- Country: Canada
- Province: Ontario
- County: Lambton
- Settled: 1830s
- Formed: 2001

Government
  - Mayor: Todd Case
  - Federal riding: Sarnia—Lambton—Bkejwanong
  - Prov. riding: Lambton—Kent—Middlesex

Area
  - Land: 290.20 km^{2} (112.05 sq mi)

Population (2016)
  - Total: 3,692
  - Density: 12.7/km^{2} (33/sq mi)
- Time zone: UTC-5 (EST)
  - Summer (DST): UTC-4 (EDT)
- Postal Code: N0M 2S0
- Area codes: 519, 226, 548
- Website: www.warwicktownship.ca

Warwick is a rural township in Lambton County, Ontario, Canada, with a population (2016) of 3,692.

Bisected by the Egremont Road that was surveyed to link London with the Lake Huron shoreline in 1832, the township began to attract settlers including those helped by charitable organizations, such as Lord Sheffield's Petworth settlers, and retired soldiers from the British Army. A village by the same name was surveyed within the township where Bear Creek crossed the Egremont.

The larger village of Watford was established to the southeast of Warwick Village when the Great Western Railway was established in the 1850s. Watford became an incorporated village in 1873 while parts of Warwick were removed for municipal purposes when the villages of Forest and Arkona were incorporated in the 1870s.

With municipal restructuring in 2001, Watford and Warwick were merged. While agriculture remains a mainstay, the township's location between the cities of London and Sarnia means that increasingly residents find work in these larger centres. Starting in 2005 a group of volunteers actively worked to research and write a detailed history of the township and collect a substantial archive of historical materials. The resulting history was published as The Township of Warwick: A Story Through Time in 2008. Subsequently, an archives of the materials was established at the Lambton Room in Wyoming, Ontario.

In addition to Warwick and Watford, the township also includes the smaller communities of Birnam and Wisbeach.

== Watford village ==
Watford was first settled in 1851 at what was known as Brown's Corners, a stagecoach stop between the village of Warwick and Brooke Township. The Great Western Railway was built in 1856 and caused the settlement to be relocated to its present location near the tracks. It was incorporated as the village of Watford in 1873. Watford was named either for the Watford in England, or by Col. Brown for his home town of Waterford, Ireland.

There was a great fire in the 1880s that destroyed much of the town during a Guy Fawkes Night celebration.

In 1972, Watford Roof Truss started manufacturing wood trusses for delivery in the Southwestern Ontario and Southern Michigan markets. Watford Roof Truss is still a major employer in the town.

== Demographics ==
In the 2021 Census of Population conducted by Statistics Canada, Warwick had a population of 3,641 living in 1,357 of its 1,425 total private dwellings, a change of −1.4% from its 2016 population of 3,692. With a land area of 290.21 km^{2} (112.05 sq mi), it had a population density of 12.5/km^{2} (32.5/sq mi) in 2021.

Canada census – Warwick, Ontario community profile

	2016	2011
Population	3,692 (-0.7% from 2011)	3,717 (-5.8% from 2006)
Land area	290.20 km^{2} (112.05 sq mi)	290.20 km^{2} (112.05 sq mi)
Population density	12.7/km^{2} (33/sq mi)	12.8/km^{2} (33/sq mi)
Median age	40.8 (M: 40.1, F: 41.3)	40.7 (M: 39.9, F: 41.7)
Private dwellings	1,432 (total)	1,434 (total)
Median household income	$72,277

References: 2016 2011

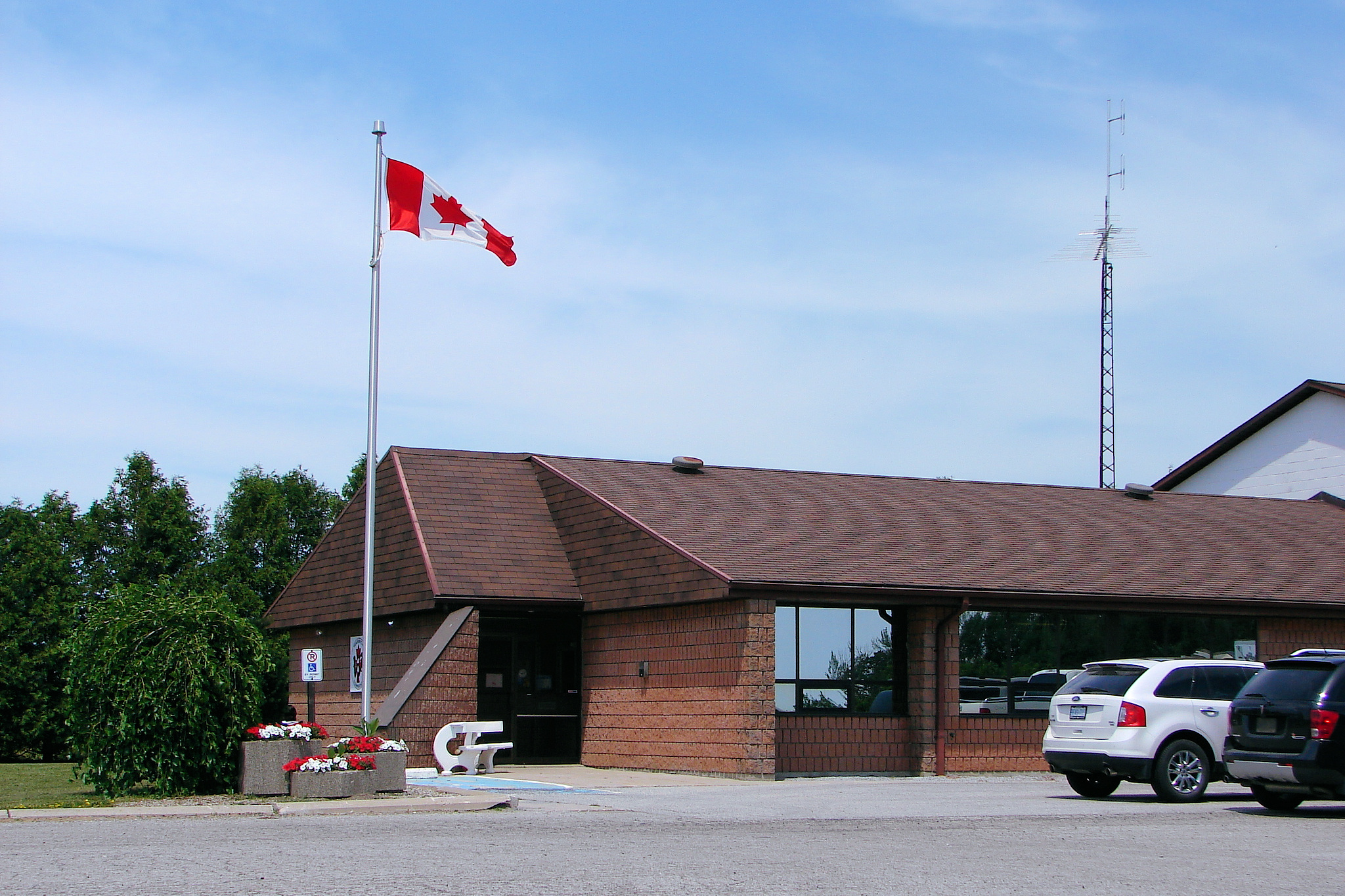
Municipal office

Historical population
Year	Pop.	±%
1996	4,141	—
2001	4,025	−2.8%
2006	3,945	−2.0%
2011	3,717	−5.8%
2016	3,692	−0.7%

== Township council ==
The township's current mayor is Todd Case, and its councillors are Jerry Westgate, Wayne Morris, Joe Manning and John Couwenberg. They were elected in 2022 and their terms will end in 2026, in conjunction with province-wide municipal elections in Ontario.

== See also ==
- List of townships in Ontario
