= Brooke-Alvinston =

- Municipality (lower-tier)
- Municipality of Brooke-Alvinston
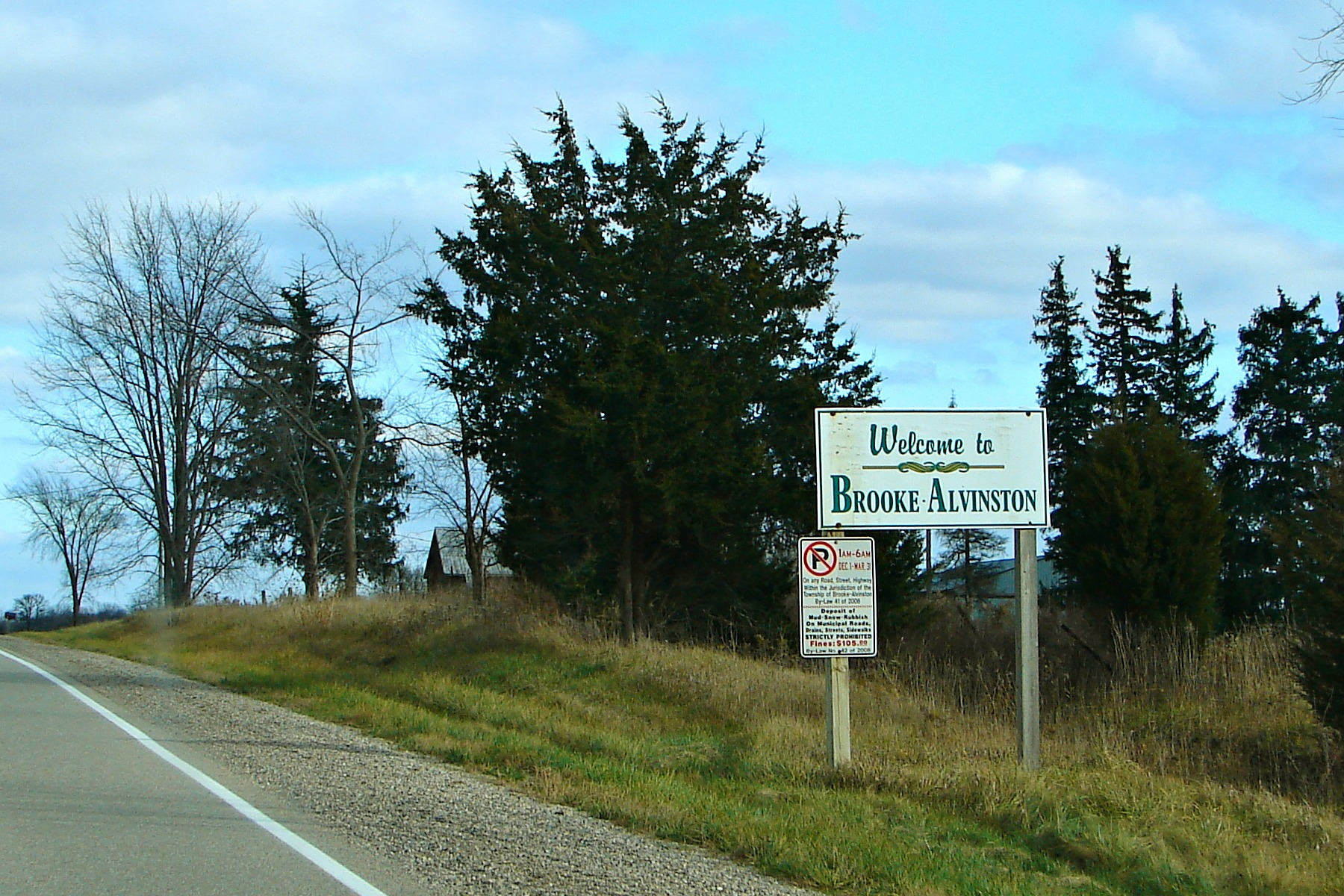

- Location within Lambton County Location within Southern Ontario
- Coordinates: 42°51′N 81°55′W
- Country: Canada
- Province: Ontario
- County: Lambton
- Settled: 1830s
- Formed: 2001

Government
  - Mayor: David Ferguson
  - Federal riding: Sarnia—Lambton—Bkejwanong
  - Prov. riding: Lambton—Kent—Middlesex

Area
  - Land: 311.30 km^{2} (120.19 sq mi)

Population (2011)
  - Total: 2,548
  - Density: 8.2/km^{2} (21/sq mi)
- Time zone: UTC-5 (EST)
  - Summer (DST): UTC-4 (EDT)
- Postal Code: N0N
- Area codes: 519 and 226
- Website: brookealvinston.com

Brooke-Alvinston is a township municipality in the Canadian province of Ontario, located within Lambton County. It was formed on January 1, 2001, when the Township of Brooke (incorporated 1842) was amalgamated with the Village of Alvinston (incorporated on June 12, 1880).

== Communities ==
The municipality comprises the communities of Alvinston, Grays, Inwood, Rokeby, Sutorville, Walnut and Weidman. Alvinston, the biggest urban centre of the municipality, is 55 kilometres (34 mi) east from Sarnia.

== Sports ==
The Brooke Alvinston Inwood Community Centre Complex located in Alvinston contains an arena, auditorium with banquet facilities for 500, and several meeting rooms. It is home to figure skaters, minor hockey and the Alvinston Killer Bees Hockey Club of the Ontario Super Hockey League.

== Attractions ==
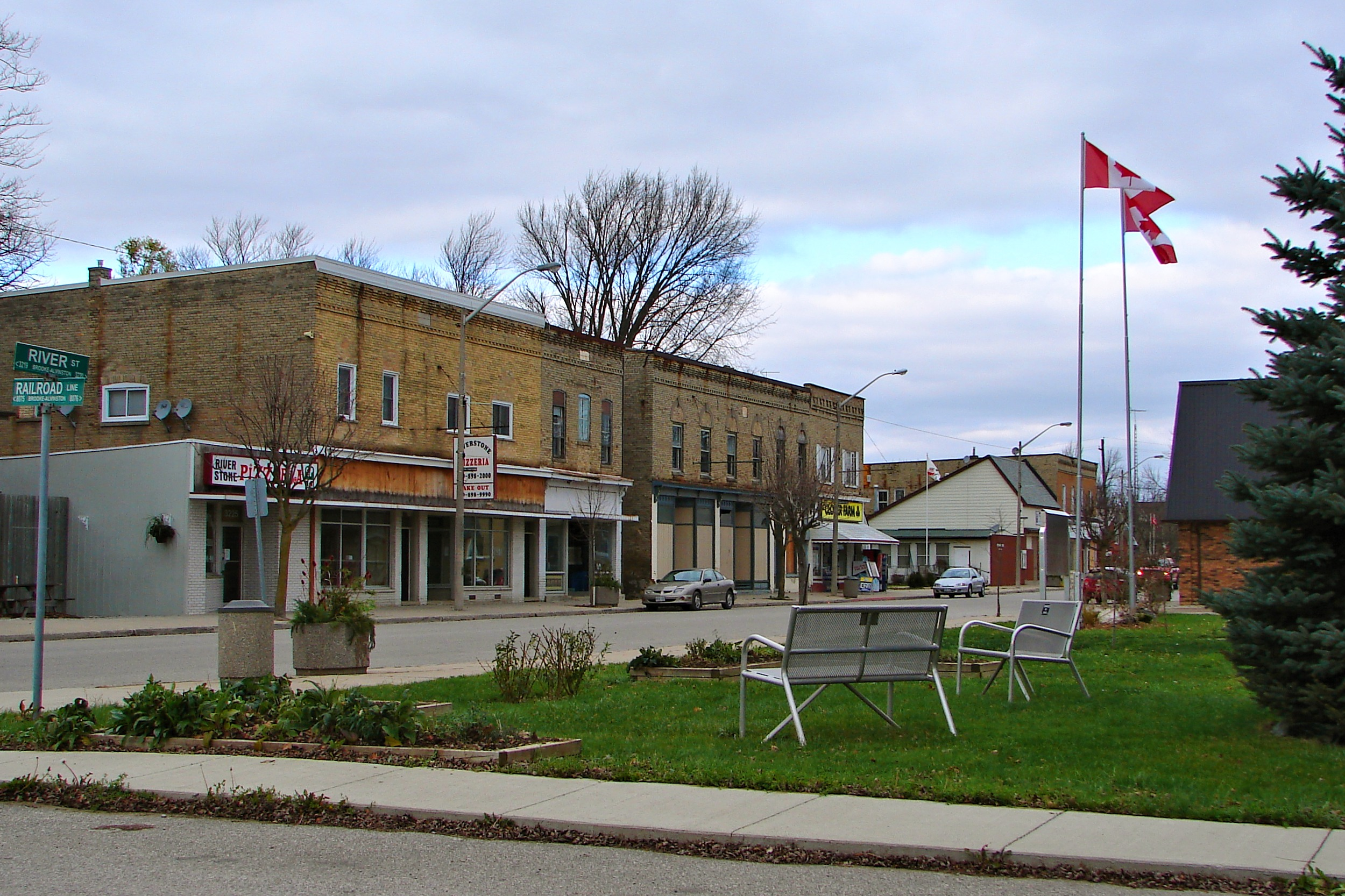
Alvinston village

A.W. Campbell Conservation Area operated by the St. Clair Region Conservation Authority is located near Alvinston. It offers camping, swimming, walking trails and picnic areas. It is also the site an annual maple syrup festival where visitors can view demonstrations of syrup production.

The Brooke Alvinston Watford Fall Fair is held annually in Alvinston. It features a tractor pull, demolition derby, parade, evening dance, midway, food concessions, exhibits in animal husbandry, field crops, horticulture, baking, art and photography, and school exhibits.

The Alvinston to Watford Optimist Road Race is a 16 kilometre race that begins in Alvinston and ends in Watford. The race, held annually, started in 1958.

Alvinston holds a town-wide garage sale annually in May, a classic car and antique tractor show in June, Canada Day celebrations in July, and a Santa Claus Parade in December.

== Recreation ==
Brooke-Alvinston has two public libraries, in Alvinston and Inwood respectively. Both libraries are part of the Lambton County Library system, which services 25 branches throughout Lambton County.

== Education ==
The Lambton Kent District School Board operates an elementary public school near Alvinston.

== Media ==
Community news is chiefly found in The Independent of Petrolia and Central Lambton. Historically, the community news was reported through two newspapers: the Glencoe-Alvinston Transcript & Free Press and the Watford Guide-Advocate. Both publications are owned by Hayter-Walden Publishing. The papers were amalgamated with the Forest Standard and the Parkhill Gazette and closed in 2023. The community was also served by Sarnia and Lambton County This Week and the Sarnia Observer.

== Demographics ==
Historical population
| Year | Pop. | ±% |
|---|---|---|
| 1996 | 2,894 | — |
| 2001 | 2,785 | −3.8% |
| 2006 | 2,661 | −4.5% |
| 2011 | 2,548 | −4.2% |
| 2016 | 2,411 | −5.4% |

In the 2021 Census of Population conducted by Statistics Canada, Brooke-Alvinston had a population of 2,359 living in 918 of its 983 total private dwellings, a change of −2.2% from its 2016 population of 2,411. With a land area of 311.41 km^{2} (120.24 sq mi), it had a population density of 7.6/km^{2} (19.6/sq mi) in 2021.

Canada census – Brooke-Alvinston community profile

| | 2021 | 2016 | 2011 |
| Population | 2,359 (-2.2% from 2016) | 2,411 (-5.4% from 2011) | 2,548 (-4.2% from 2006) |
| Land area | 311.41 km^{2} (120.24 sq mi) | 311.30 km^{2} (120.19 sq mi) | 311.30 km^{2} (120.19 sq mi) |
| Population density | 7.6/km^{2} (20/sq mi) | 7.7/km^{2} (20/sq mi) | 8.2/km^{2} (21/sq mi) |
| Median age | 41.6 (M: 40.4, F: 42.8) | 42.6 (M: 41.0, F: 43.7) | 39.9 (M: 38.8, F: 40.6) |
| Private dwellings | 983 (total) 918 (occupied) | 994 (total) | 1,034 (total) |
| Median household income | $82,000 | $67,456 |

References: 2021 2016 2011

== See also ==
- List of townships in Ontario
