= Southwest Middlesex =

- Municipality (lower-tier)
- Municipality of Southwest Middlesex
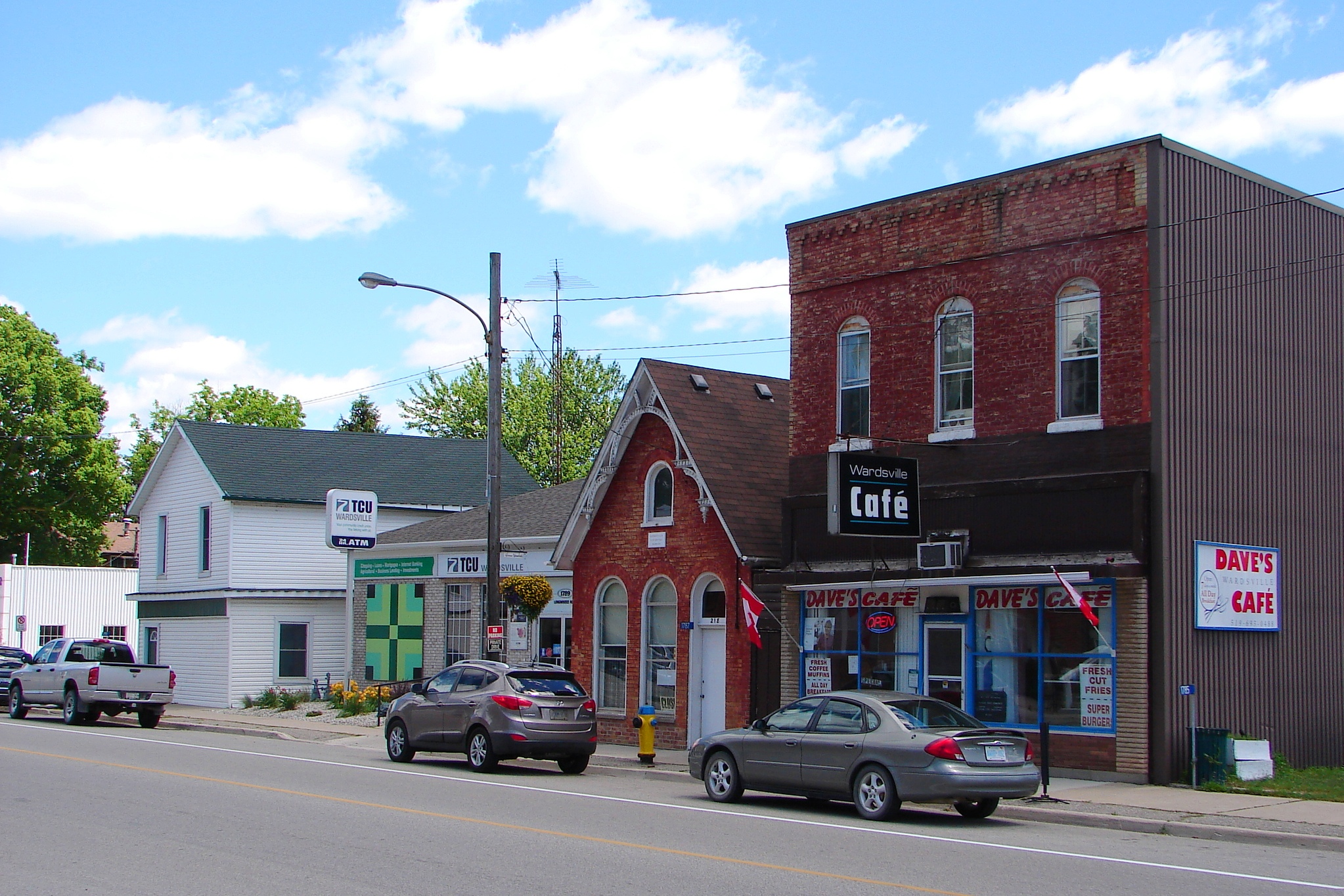
- Wardsville

- Location within Middlesex County Location within Southern Ontario
- Coordinates: 42°45′N 81°42′W
- Country: Canada
- Province: Ontario
- County: Middlesex
- Formed: January 1, 2001

Government
  - Mayor: Allan Mayhew
  - Federal riding: Middlesex—London
  - Prov. riding: Lambton—Kent—Middlesex

Area
  - Land: 427.88 km^{2} (165.21 sq mi)

Population (2016)
  - Total: 5,723
  - Density: 13.4/km^{2} (35/sq mi)
- Time zone: UTC-5 (EST)
  - Summer (DST): UTC-4 (EDT)
- Postal Code: N0L, N0M
- Area codes: 519 and 226
- Website: www.southwestmiddlesex.ca

Southwest Middlesex is a municipality in Middlesex County, Ontario, Canada.

The restructured municipality of Southwest Middlesex was incorporated on January 1, 2001. This amalgamation joined the Village of Glencoe and the Village of Wardsville with the Townships of Ekfrid and Mosa. Southwest Middlesex had a population of 5,723 in the Canada 2016 Census. Southwest Middlesex is located in the southwest corner of Middlesex County.

== Communities ==
The township includes the communities of Appin, Ekfrid, Glencoe, Lewis Corners, Macksville, Mayfair, Newbury Station, North Appin Station, North Ekfrid, North Glencoe Station, Riverside, Strathburn, Tait’s Corners, Wardsville and Woodgreen. It surrounds, but does not include, the independent village of Newbury. The township administrative offices are located in Glencoe.

Wardsville was the site of the Battle of Longwoods during the War of 1812.

== Demographics ==
In the 2021 Census of Population conducted by Statistics Canada, Southwest Middlesex had a population of 5,893 living in 2,407 of its 2,503 total private dwellings, a change of 3% from its 2016 population of 5,723. With a land area of 427.82 km^{2} (165.18 sq mi), it had a population density of 13.8/km^{2} (35.7/sq mi) in 2021.

Canada census – Southwest Middlesex community profile

	2016	2011
Population	5,723 (-2.3% from 2011)	5,860 (-0.5% from 2006)
Land area	427.88 km^{2} (165.21 sq mi)	427.97 km^{2} (165.24 sq mi)
Population density	13.4/km^{2} (35/sq mi)	13.7/km^{2} (35/sq mi)
Median age	46.3 (M: 46.1, F: 46.7)	45.3 (M: 44.8, F: 45.9)
Private dwellings	2,505 (total)	2,470 (total)
Median household income	$64,000

References: 2016 2011

Historical population
Year	Pop.	±%
1996	6,204	—
2001	6,144	−1.0%
2006	5,890	−4.1%
2011	5,860	−0.5%
2016	5,723	−2.3%

== See also ==
- List of townships in Ontario
