= Adelaide Metcalfe =

Township in Ontario, Canada

- Township (lower-tier)
- Township of Adelaide Metcalfe
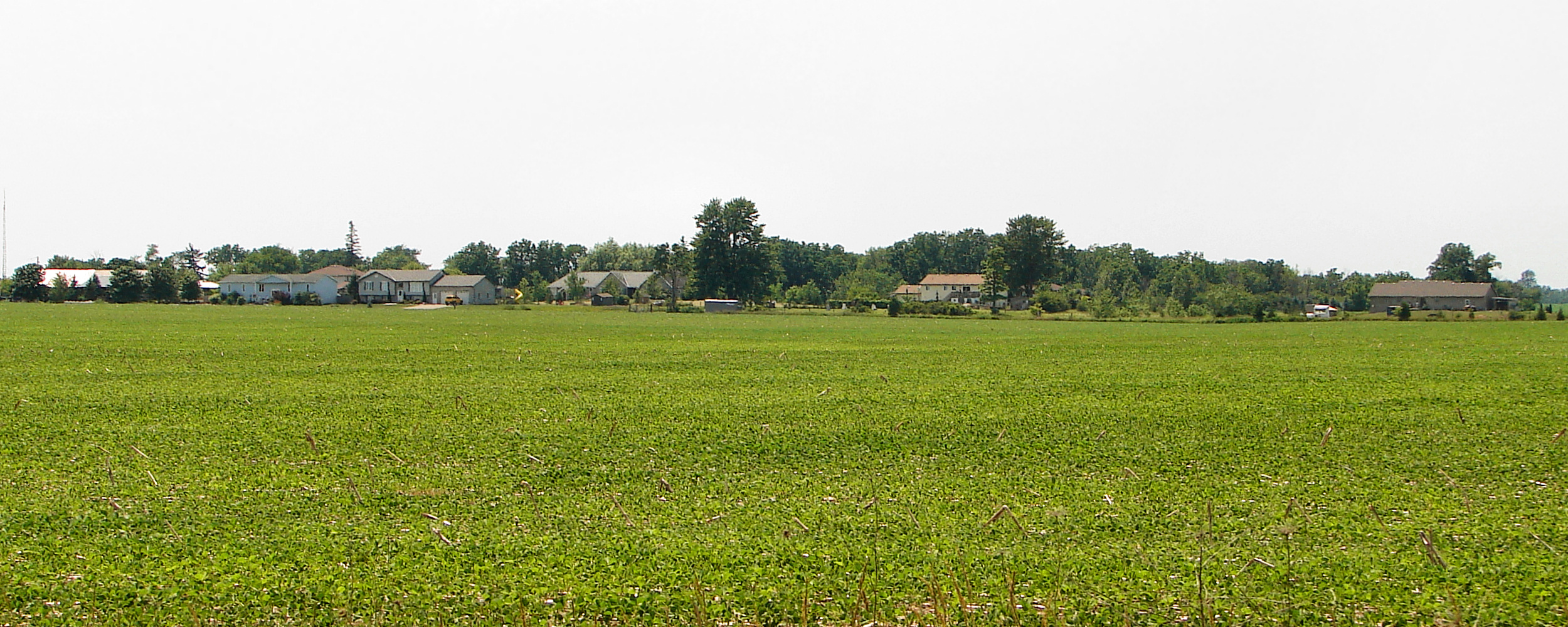
- Adelaide in June 2012

- Location within Middlesex County Location within Southern Ontario
- Coordinates: 42°57′N 81°42′W
- Country: Canada
- Province: Ontario
- County: Middlesex
- Formed: January 1, 2001

Government
  - Mayor: Susan Clarke
  - Federal riding: Middlesex—London
  - Prov. riding: Lambton—Kent—Middlesex

Area
  - Land: 331.46 km^{2} (127.98 sq mi)
- Elevation: 227 m (745 ft)

Population (2016)
  - Total: 2,990
  - Density: 9/km^{2} (23/sq mi)
- Time zone: UTC-5 (EST)
  - Summer (DST): UTC-4 (EDT)
- Postal Code: N0M, N7G
- Area codes: 519 and 226
- Website: adelaidemetcalfe.on.ca

Adelaide Metcalfe (2016 population: 2,990) is a township in Middlesex County, Ontario, Canada. It was formed on January 1, 2001 through the amalgamation of the former Township of Adelaide and the Township of Metcalfe. It is part of the London census metropolitan area.

== Communities ==
The township contains the communities of Adelaide, Crathie, Dejong, Kerwood, Keyser, Mullifarry, Napier, Napperton, Springfield, Walkers and Wrightmans Corners. The administrative offices of the township are in the locality of Adelaide.

== Demographics ==
Adelaide Metcalfe
Year	Pop.	±%
1991	2,956 (Note: Population is the sum of Adelaide (township): 1970 and Metcalfe (township): 986)	—
1996	3,128 (Note: Population is the sum of Adelaide (township): 1901 and Metcalfe (township): 1057)	+5.8%
2001	3,149	+0.7%
2006	3,150	+0.0%
2011	3,028	−3.9%
2016	2,990	−1.3%
2016, 2011, 2006, earlier

In the 2021 Census of Population conducted by Statistics Canada, Adelaide-Metcalfe had a population of 3,011 living in 1,013 of its 1,056 total private dwellings, a change of 0.7% from its 2016 population of 2,990. With a land area of 331.11 km^{2} (127.84 sq mi), it had a population density of 9.1/km^{2} (23.6/sq mi) in 2021.

According to the 2011 Canadian Census, the median age was 39.7 years old which is approximately the same as the national average at 40.6 years old.

According to the 2011 National Household Survey, 85.8% of Adelaide Metcalfe residents are Canadian citizens by birth, and about 2.5% of residents are recent immigrants (from 2001 to 2011). Residents of Adelaide Metcalfe are primarily White (96.6%), with a small community of Koreans (3.3%). Specifically, residents of Adelaide Metcalfe identify their ethnic origin as: Canadian (36.2%), English (32.1%), Dutch (27.2%), Scottish (26%), and Irish (18.2%). According to the 2011 Census, English is the mother tongue of 87.2% of the population, with a small population of Dutch (4.7%) and Portuguese (2.3%) speakers. Adelaide Metcalfe has 63.7% Christian adherents whereas 35.7% does not affiliate with any religion.

The highest levels of education obtained by residents aged 25 to 64 years old, are as follows: 43.1% of people have a post-secondary schooling degree (including 9.2% with a University degree or higher), 32.6% have a high school degree (or equivalent) and 24.2% have no certificate, diploma or degree; these represent somewhat higher education rates than Canadian averages at 64.1%, 23.2%, & 12.7% respectively.

The median household income before taxes is $28,644, and after taxes is $26,846; lower than the provincial or national figures at $66,358 and $61,072 pre-tax ($58,717 and $54,089 after tax) respectively. The median commute time to work for those 15 years and over was 20.3 minutes with almost all commutes (94.3%) done by personal vehicle as a driver. The median value of a dwelling in Adelaide Metcalfe is $250,399 which is less than the Canadian median value of $280,552 and the Ontario median value of $300,862.

== Government ==
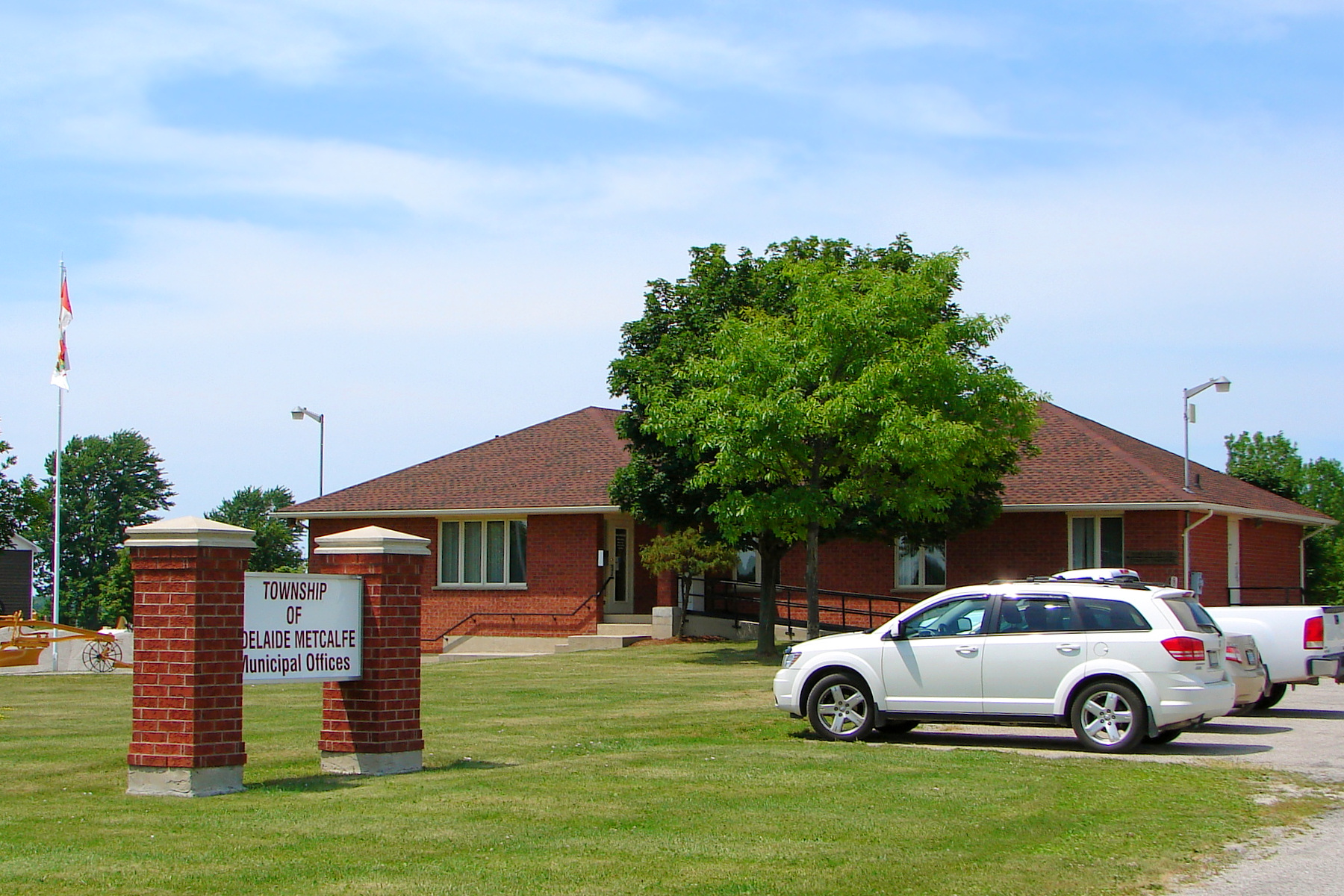
Municipal office

The Township is led by a Council with a mayor and four councillors. The current council was elected in 2018 along with all other municipal elections in Ontario, and the next election will be in 2022. The members of the current council are:

- Mayor: Kurtis Smith
- Councillors: Betty Ann MacKinnon, Mary Ann Hendrikx, Mike Brodie, Sue Clarke

== Notable people ==
- Matthew J. Royal (1863–1900), novelist and playwright born in Adelaide
- General Arthur Currie (5 December 1875 – 30 November 1933) - a senior officer of the Canadian Army was born in Napperton

== See also ==
- List of municipalities in Ontario
- List of townships in Ontario
- Royal eponyms in Canada
