= Forests of Canada =

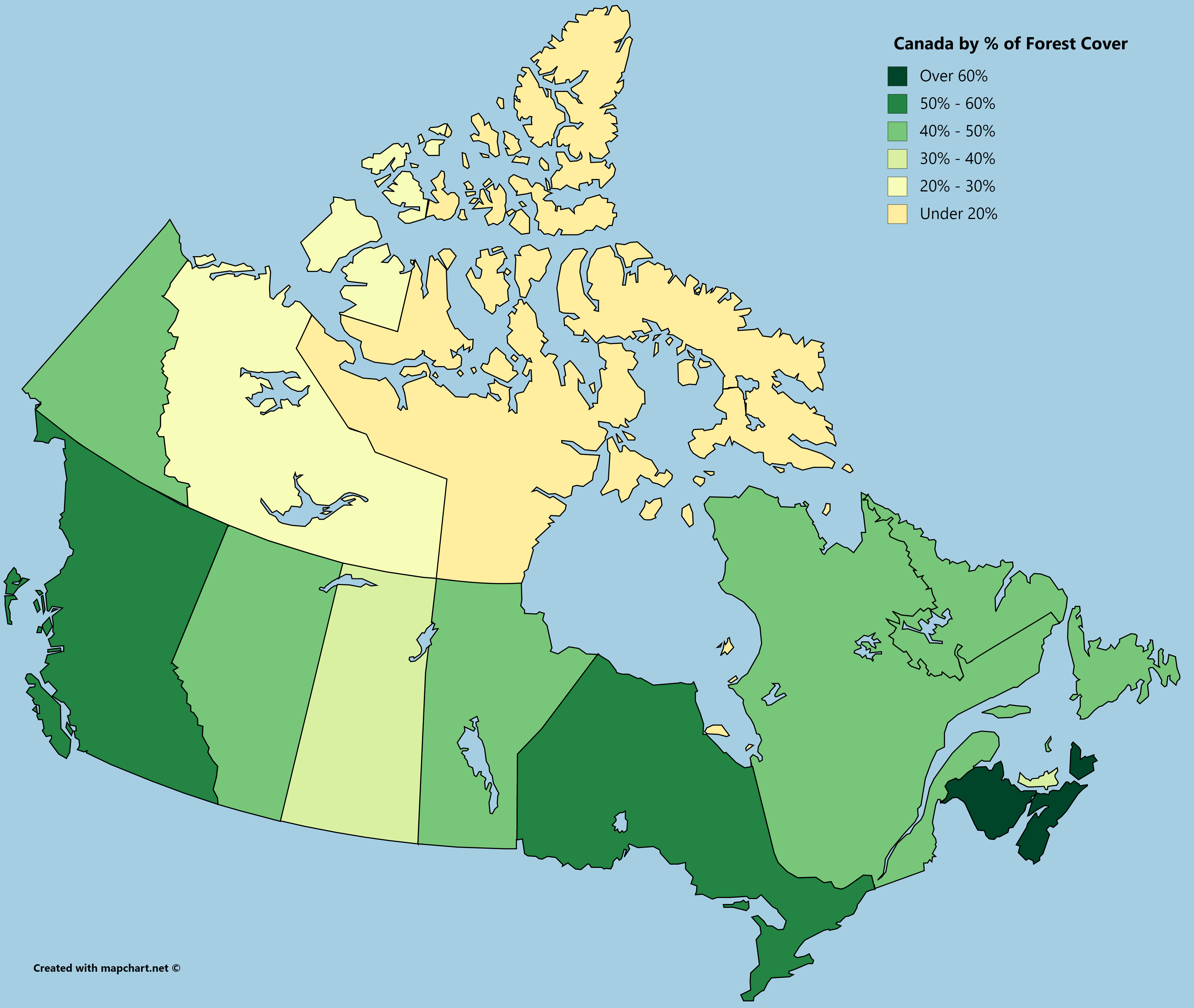
Forest cover percentage of Canadian provinces and territories

The forests of Canada are located across much of the country. Approximately half of Canada is covered by forest, totaling around 3.69 million km^{2} (1.42 million sq mi). Over 90% of Canada's forests are owned by the public (Crown land and Provincial forest). About half of the forests are allocated for logging.

Named forests are found within eight distinct regions. These forests may also be part of ecosystems, a number of which extend south into the United States. For example, the Northern hardwood forest is an ecosystem located in large areas of southeastern and south central Canada as well as in Ontario and Quebec. The Great Lakes region includes white pine, hemlock and red maples, yellow birch, and beech trees. The Maritimes region is dominated by the red spruce, while the black spruce is prevalent in the eastern Laurentian, with spruce in the western Laurentian. The balsam fir, white cedar tamarack, white birch, and aspen and jack pine are also found in the eastern portion of the country. The tundra is home to the aspen, bur oak, balm of Gilead, cottonwood and balsam poplar. The west coast has the western hemlock, red cedar, Douglas fir, Sitka spruce, and western white pine being dominate. The Rocky Mountain region consistent of alpine fir, Engelmann spruce, lodgepole pine and mountain hemlock.

Ontario alone makes up for 20% of Canada's Forests, which equates to roughly 2% of the forests in the world. Ontario follows strict laws and regulations to manage its forests in a sustainable way. Ontario Forests are mainly managed by the Ministry of Natural Resources. They ensure a fair trade between sustaining the forest, while protecting the biodiversity of the ecosystem and providing legal methods for harvesting to benefit the economy.

== Statistics ==
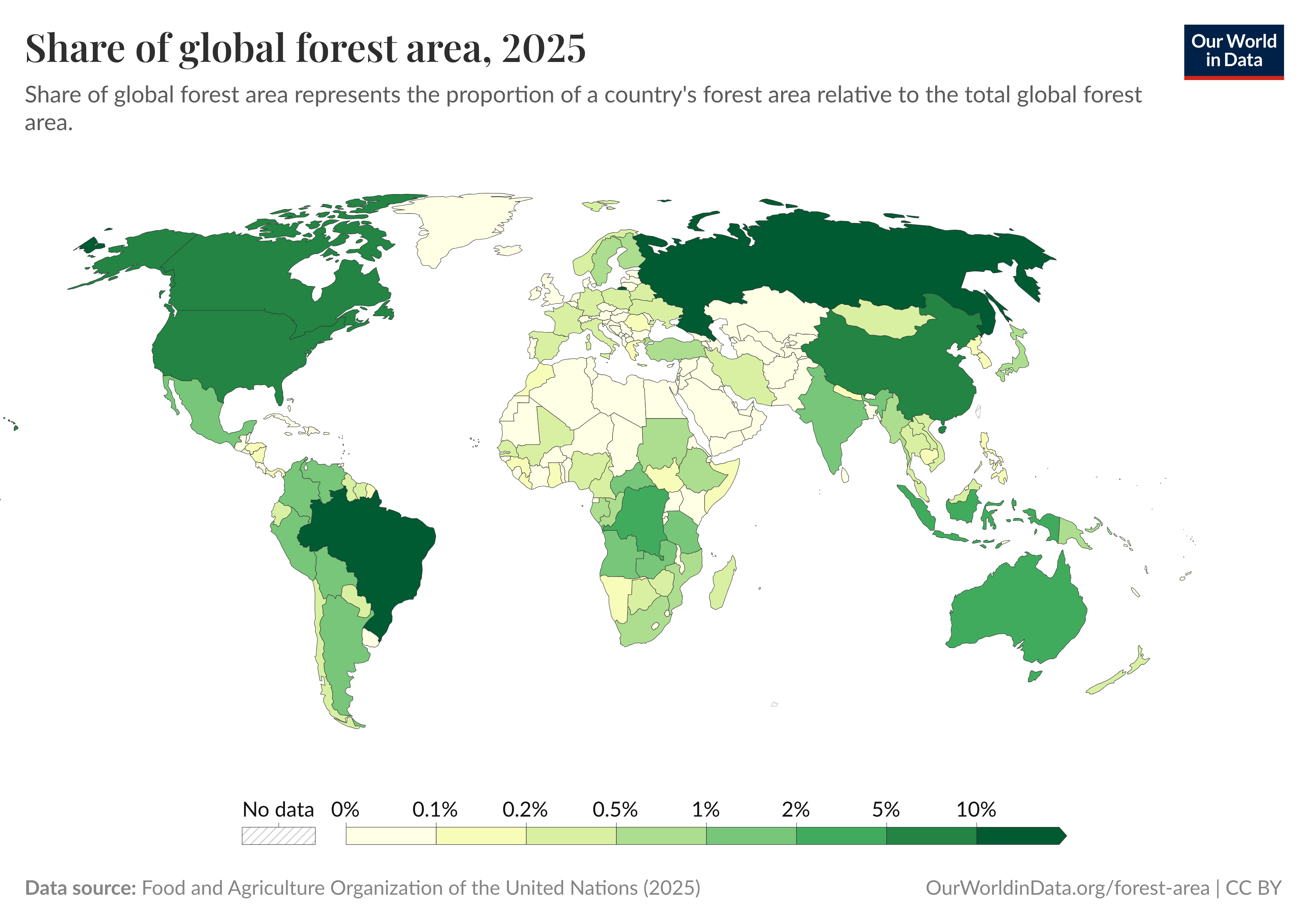
Share of global forest in each country

Canada possesses 369 million hectares (ha) of forest, which constitutes 9% of the global forest area and 25% of the worldwide boreal forest. As of 2022, 72% of the Crown forest land under management in Canada is certified according to third-party sustainable forest management standards. Approximately 10% of Canada's forests are designated as protected areas (2022).

The forest sector in Canada contributed $33. 4 billion (1. 2%) to the nation's nominal GDP in 2022. In the same year, this sector employed 212,660 individuals, with average annual earnings estimated at $51,900 (2022).

== Protection ==
The protection of Canada's forests is reinforced through robust legislation and regulations at the federal, provincial/territorial, and municipal levels. Sustainable forest management (SFM) represents a collaborative initiative involving all tiers of government, industry stakeholders, and the general public. Numerous key federal statutes underpin the objectives of SFM, including the:

- Forestry Act
- Species at Risk Act
- Migratory Birds Convention Act
- Fisheries Act
- Impact Assessment Act
- Canadian Environmental Protection Act
- Pest Control Products Act
- Fertilizers Act

The Species at Risk Act plays a critical role in Canada's strategy to safeguard biodiversity, having been established to fulfill Canada's obligations under the United Nations Convention on the Conservation of Biodiversity.

== Regions ==
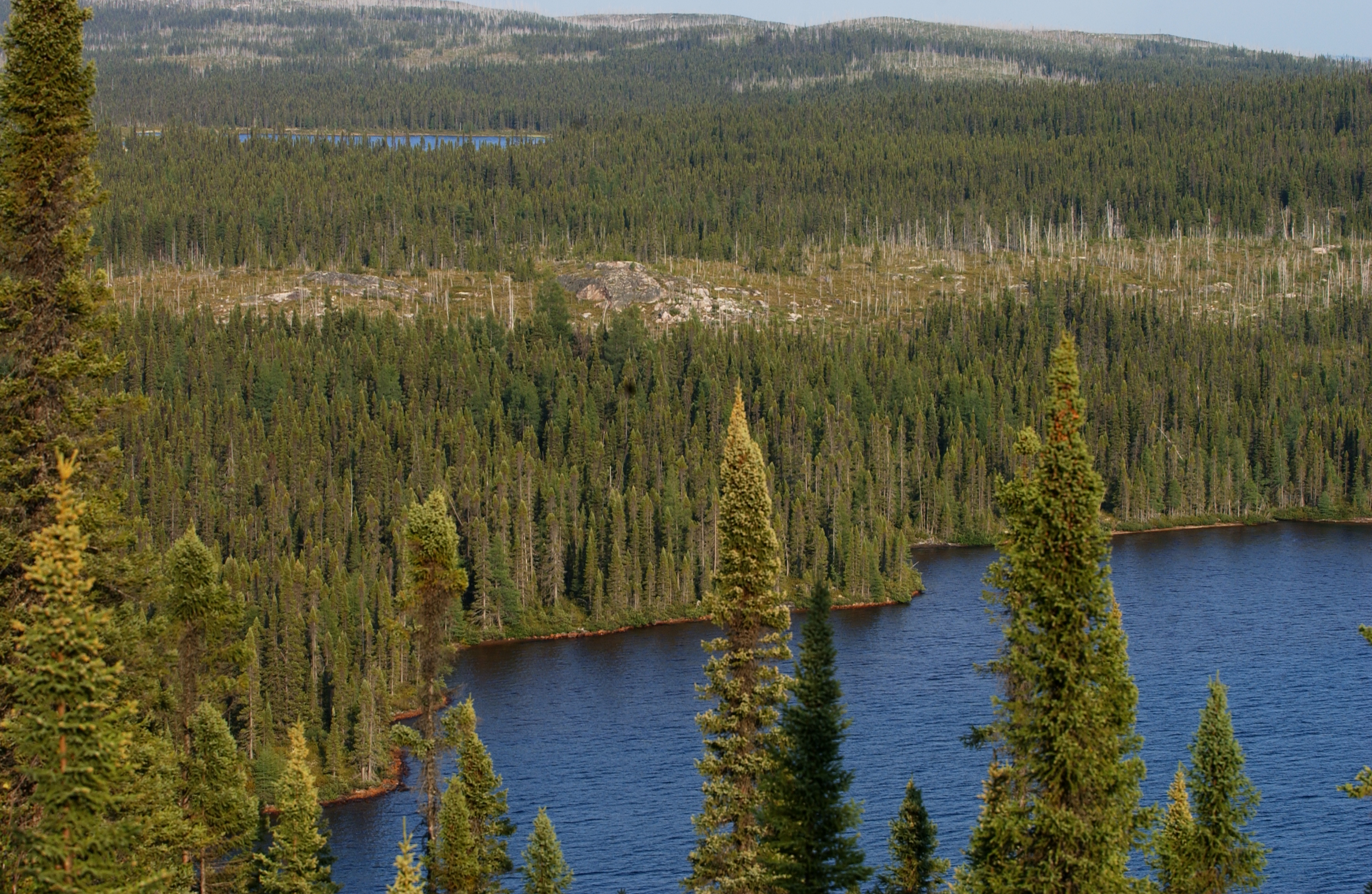
Taiga forest in the Boreal Forest Region in Quebec

The forests of Canada are located within eight regions:

- Acadian Forest Region - This region comprises a temperate broadleaf and mixed forest ecoregion located in Quebec as well as the Maritime Provinces in Eastern Canada, and extends into the United States.
- Boreal Forest Region - This the largest forest region in Canada. It is located in the north and contains about one third of the world's circumpolar boreal forests.
- Coast Forest Region - Located on the west coast, this region almost entirely comprises coniferous trees including the Douglas-fir, Sitka spruce, western hemlock, and western red cedar.
- Columbia Forest Region - Also mostly comprising coniferous trees, this region is located between the Rocky Mountains and the central plateau in British Columbia.
- Deciduous Forest Region - This region is located between Lake Huron, Lake Ontario, and Lake Erie in southwestern Ontario.
- Great Lakes-St. Lawrence Forest - This region is the second largest (the boreal being the largest), and is located from southeastern Manitoba to the Gaspé Peninsula.
- Montane Forest Region - Located in the west of Canada, this region covers parts of the Kootenays, the central plateau of British Columbia, and a number of valleys close to Alberta's border.
- Subalpine Forest Region - This region is located in British Columbia and Alberta. It covers the Rocky Mountains from the west coast to Alberta's uplands.

== By province ==
The following is a list of forests, ecoregions, ecozones, forested parklands and provincial parks.

=== Alberta ===
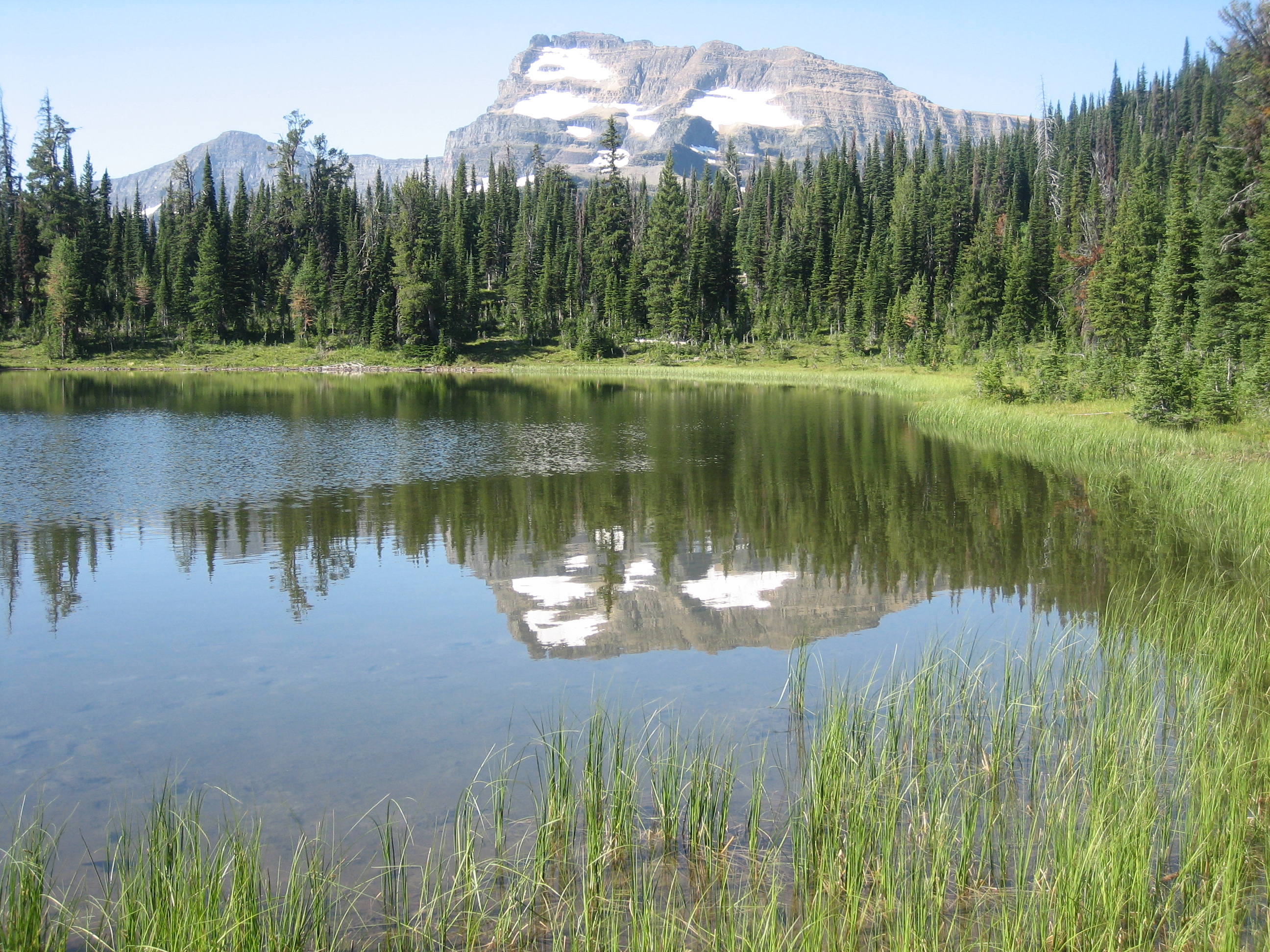
Alberta's North Central Rockies forest

- Alberta Mountain forests
- Alberta-British Columbia foothills forests
- Aspen parkland
- Mid-Continental Canadian forests
- Muskwa-Slave Lake forests
- North Central Rockies forest

=== British Columbia ===
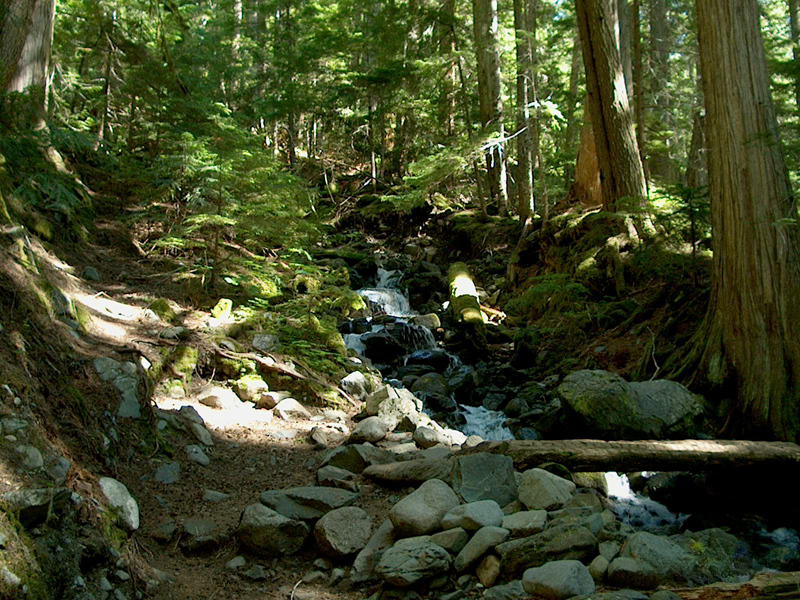
British Columbia mainland coastal forests

- Alberta-British Columbia foothills forests
- Aspen parkland
- British Columbia mainland coastal forests
- Cascade Mountains leeward forests
- Elkington Forest
- Fraser Plateau and Basin complex
- Great Bear Rainforest
- Inland rainforest
- Lower Mainland Ecoregion
- Malcolm Knapp Research Forest
- Muskwa-Slave Lake forests
- North Central Rockies forest
- Northern Pacific coastal forests
- Pacific temperate rainforests

=== Manitoba ===
- Agassiz Provincial Forest
- Belair Provincial Forest
- Brightstone Sand Hill Provincial Forest
- Cat Hills Provincial Forest
- Cormorant Provincial Forest
- Duck Mountain Provincial Forest
- Mid-Continental Canadian forests

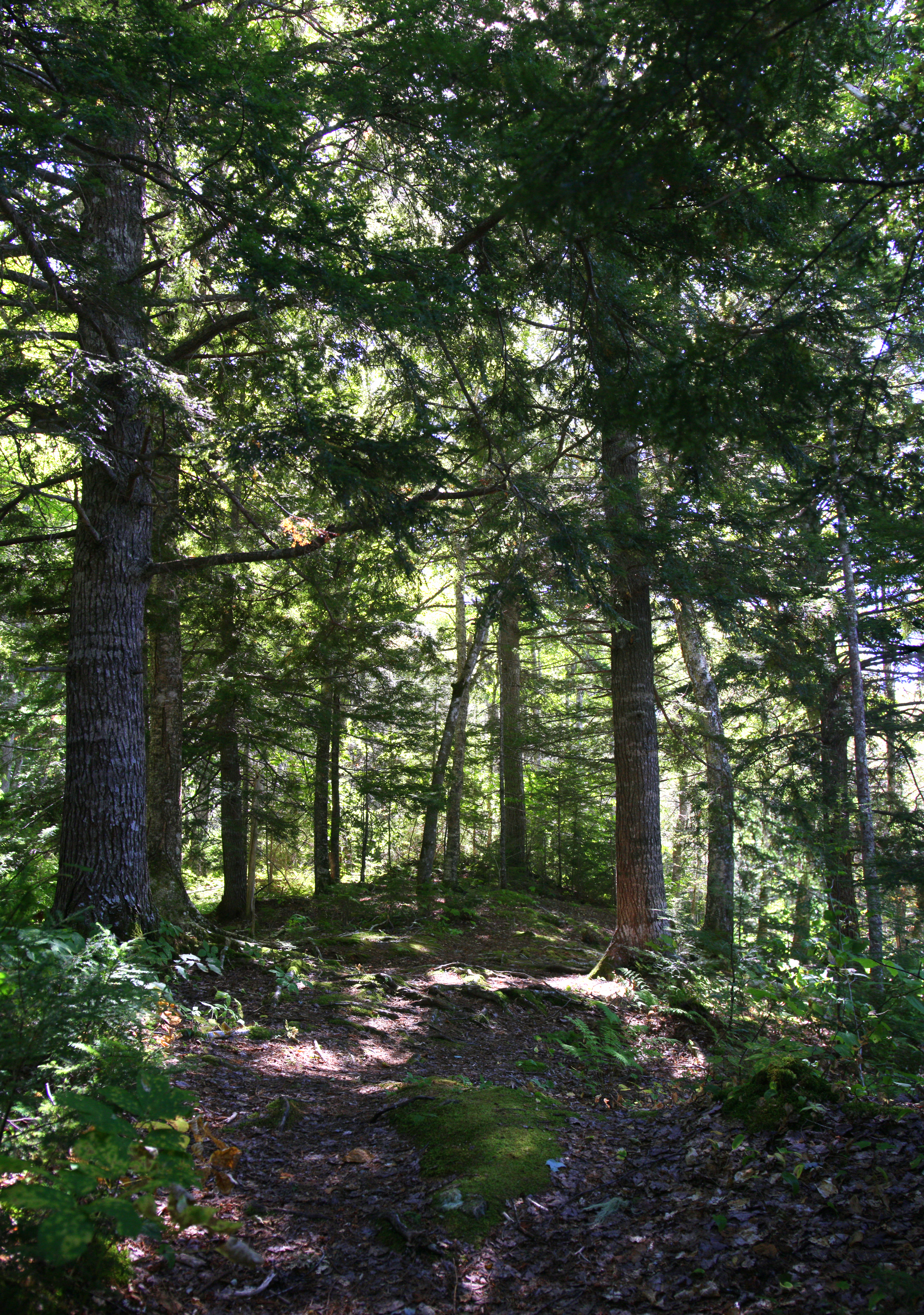
Ben Eoin Provincial Park

- Midwestern Canadian Shield forests
- Moose Creek Provincial Forest
- Northwest Angle Provincial Forest
- Porcupine Provincial Forest
- Sandilands Provincial Forest
- Spruce Woods Provincial Forest
- Swan-Pelican Provincial Forest
- Tallgrass Aspen Parkland
- Turtle Mountain Provincial Forest
- Wampum Provincial Forest
- Whiteshell Provincial Forest

=== Newfoundland ===
- Newfoundland Highland forests

=== Nova Scotia ===
- Ben Eoin Provincial Park

=== Ontario ===
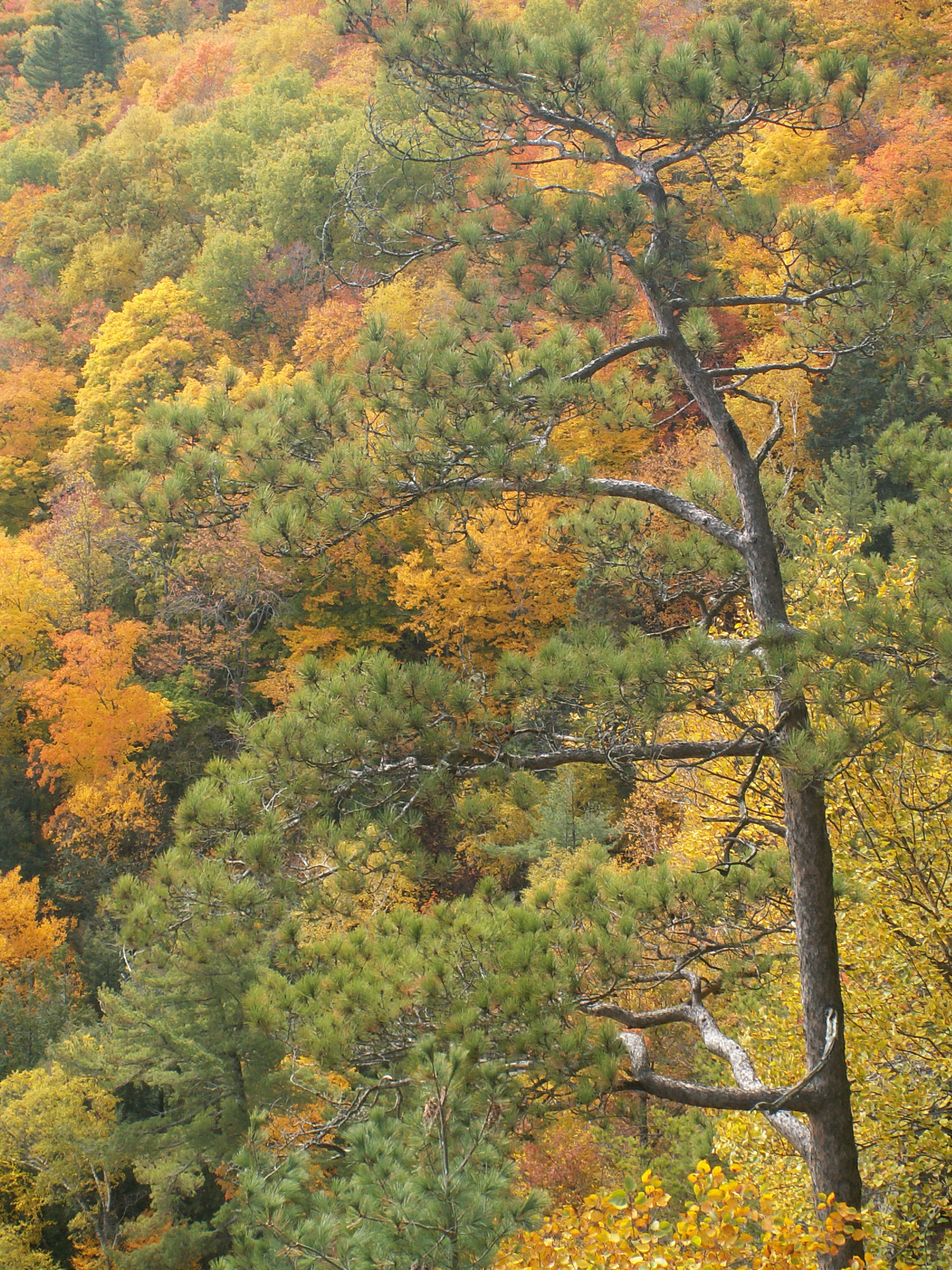
Ontario's Eastern Great Lakes lowland forests

- Barker's Bush
- Carolinian forest
- Central Canadian Shield forests
- Crothers Woods
- Eastern Great Lakes lowland forests
- Ganaraska Region
- Haliburton Forest
- Happy Valley Forest
- John E. Pearce Provincial Park
- Larose Forest
- Laurentian Mixed Forest Province
- Long Point, Ontario
- Midwestern Canadian Shield forests
- Mixed Wood Plains Ecozone (CEC)
- Niagara Glen Nature Reserve
- Obabika Old-Growth Forest
- Pinery Provincial Park
- Point Pelee National Park
- Rock Glen Conservation Area
- Rock Point Provincial Park
- Rondeau Provincial Park
- Short Hills Provincial Park
- Southwest Elgin Forest Complex
- Western Great Lakes forests
- Wheatley Provincial Park

=== Prince Edward Island ===
- Beach Grove Memorial Forest
- Strathgartney Woodlands

=== Quebec ===
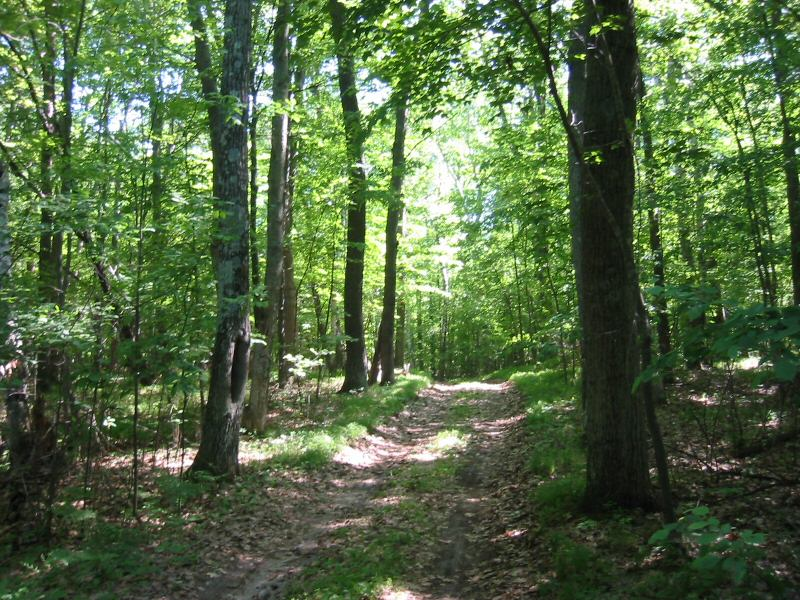
Quebec's Laurentian Mixed Forest Province

- Angell Woods
- Bois Beckett Forest
- Central Canadian Shield forests
- Eastern Canadian forests
- Eastern Canadian Shield taiga
- Eastern Great Lakes lowland forests
- Great North Woods
- Laurentian Mixed Forest Province
- Mixed Wood Plains Ecozone (CEC)

=== Saskatchewan ===
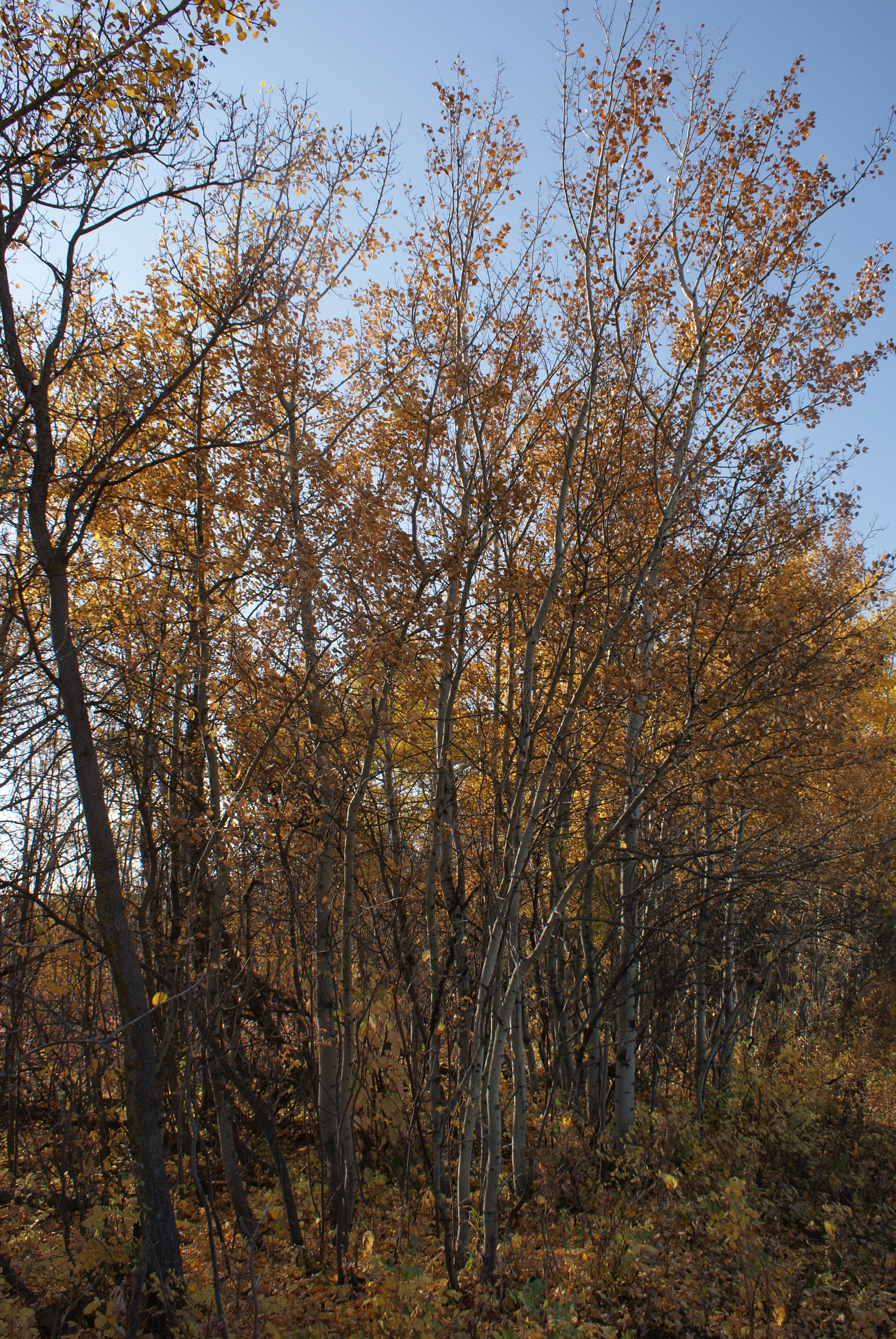
Saskatchewan's Aspen parkland

- Canwood Provincial Forest
- Fort à la Corne Provincial Forest
- Nisbet Provincial Forest
- Northern Provincial Forest
- Porcupine Provincial Forest
- Torch River Provincial Forest

=== Yukon ===
- Yukon Interior dry forests

== Other forest areas ==
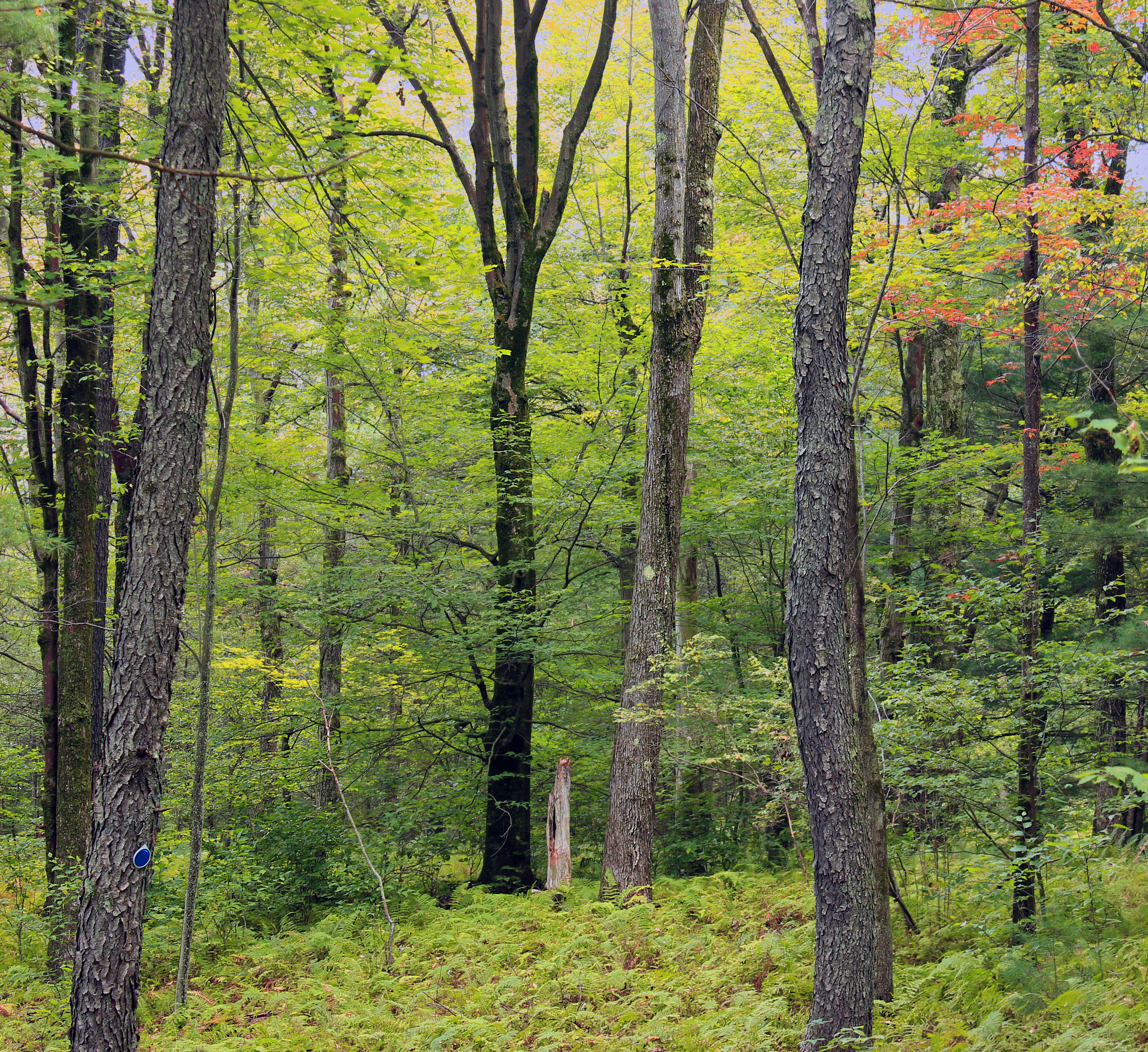
Northern hardwood forest

- Northern hardwood forest
- Northwoods (forest)

=== Temperate broadleaf and mixed forests ===
- Beech-maple forest - This forest is located mostly in eastern United States and extends into southern Canada.
- Carolinian forest
- Eastern forest-boreal transition
- Eastern Great Lakes lowland forests
- John E. Pearce Provincial Park
- Long Point, Ontario
- Niagara Glen Nature Reserve
- Northern hardwood forest
- Pinery Provincial Park
- Point Pelee National Park
- Rock Point Provincial Park
- Rondeau Provincial Park
- Short Hills Provincial Park
- Southwest Elgin Forest Complex
- Western Great Lakes forests
- Wheatley Provincial Park
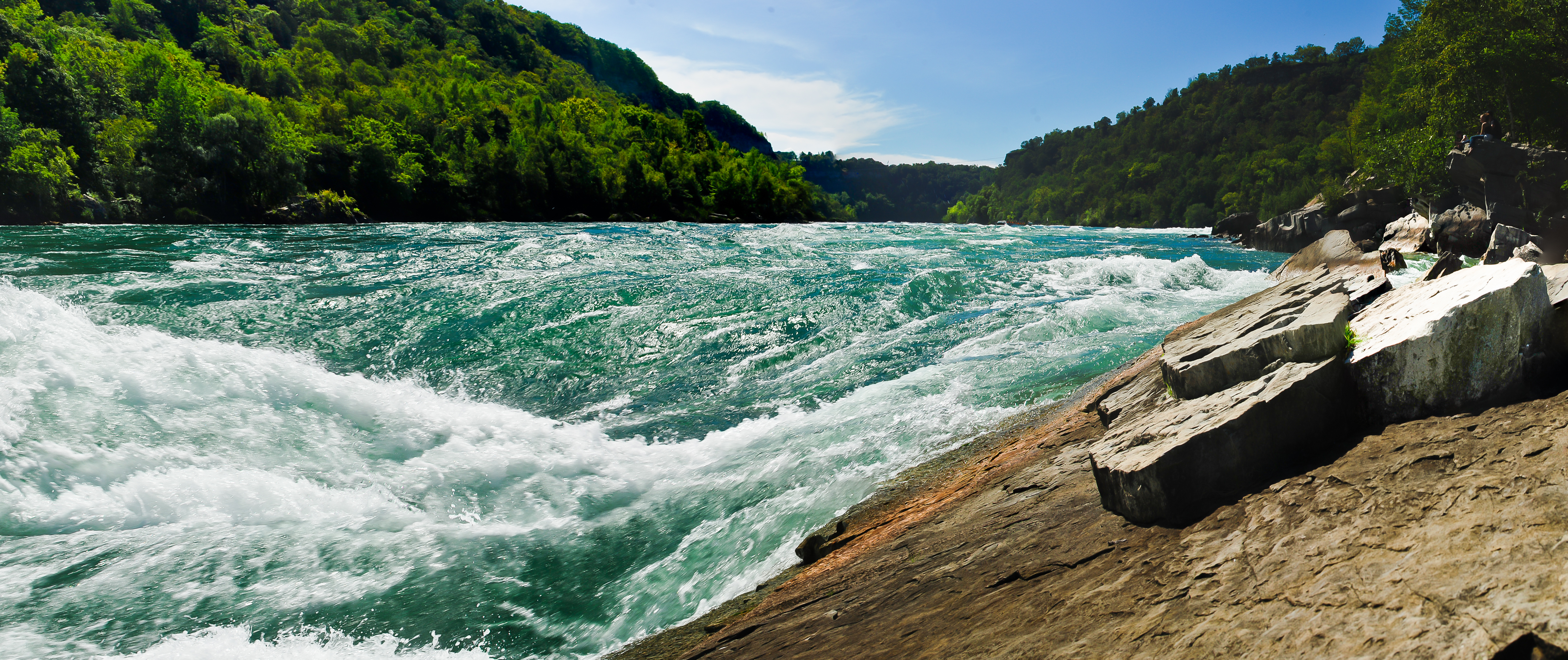
A view of the Niagara River from Niagara Glen Nature Reserve, surrounded by forest

== See also ==
- Forest cover by province or territory in Canada
- List of countries by forest area
