= Hungry Hollow =

Hungry Hollow may refer to:

- Georgetown, Ontario, Canada
- Arkona, Ontario, Canada
- Granite City, Illinois, US
- Garrett County, Maryland, US
- Phillips County, Kansas, US
- Klamath County, Oregon, US

== Other uses ==
- Hungry Hollow: The Story of a Natural Place, a novel by Alexander Dewdney
