= Rock Glen Conservation Area =

Conservation area in Ontario, Canada

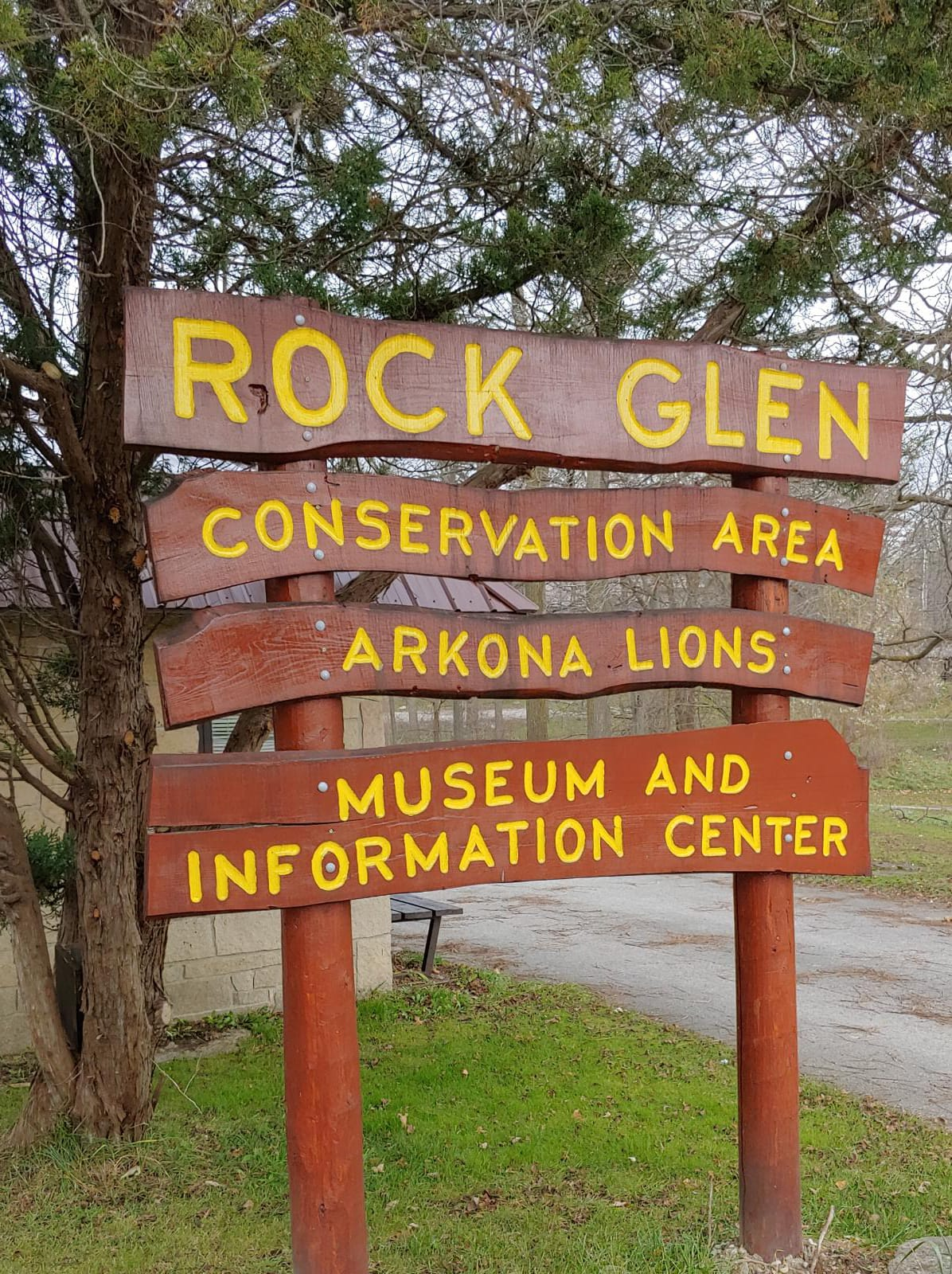
- Rock Glen Conservation Area (Arkona, Ontario, Canada).

- Location within Ontario
- Location: Arkona, Ontario, Lambton Shores, Ontario, Canada
- Coordinates: 43°05′03.46″N 81°49′17.28″W
- Area: 27 ha (67 acres)
- Elevation: 181 m (594 ft)
- Established: 2011
- Named for: Former Rock Glen Power Company, 1907.
- Governing body: Ausable Bayfield Conservation Authority
- Website: abca.on.ca

Rock Glen Conservation Area is a suburban conservation area located in the town of Arkona, in the municipality of Lambton Shores, Ontario, Canada. The conservation area is owned and maintained by the Ausable Bayfield Conservation Authority (ABCA). The former "Ausable River Conservation Authority" was Ontario's first conservation authority, created in 1946. The Bayfield River watershed and smaller streams were added in 1971. Local municipalities and the Province of Ontario formed "Ausable Bayfield Conservation Authority" (ABCA) to prevent the loss of important local ecosystems, to protect life and property through flood management, and to build a healthier natural environment on a watershed scale. Rock Glen Conservation Area is situated in a transition zone between the Carolinian forest zone to the south, and the Great Lakes (St. Lawrence Zone to the north), in Lambton Shores, Ontario, Canada. On the conservation area grounds is the Arkona Lions Museum and Information Centre; which houses a collection of Devonian period fossils and Aboriginal artifacts found in the local area.

== History ==
Civilization around Rock Glen dates back to the time when Paleolithic or Early First Nations peoples used the nearby hills to hunt the barren ground for caribou some 10,000-years-ago. Succeeding the Paleolithic humans at the end of the Pleistocene were the Archaic First Nations who had adapted to a much milder climate some 6,000-years-ago. The museum at the conservation area displays "fluted points" associated with the Pleistocene people and many Clovis Point Meadow Cache Blades from the Archaic aboriginal peoples.

This area features some of the best Devonian Period fossils in North America. It is home to a 350 million year old fossil deposit. Erosion by water has exposed a geological formation called the "Hungry Hollow Formation" and washed out many of the different fossils contained there. The most commonly found fossils are brachiopods, horn corals (Heliophyllum halli), and crinoid stem sections; which are remains of the marine life of the Devonian period. Trilobites have also been found.

When the pioneer settlers arrived in the area in the mid-1800s, they built some grist mills within the present-day conservation area, one of which was powered by an 11-metre overshot wheel. The mill pond, although dry, can still be seen immediately upstream and southwest of Rock Glen Falls. Part of the mill foundation has a platform that affords visitors an excellent view of the waterfalls. In 1907, the Rock Glen Power Company constructed a small hydro-electric dam on the Ausable River at Rock Glen. Following the formation of Ontario Hydro, the Rock Glen dam ceased operation shortly after the Second World War. In response to complaints from anglers that fish were unable to travel upstream to spawn, a Canadian Army demolition squad blew up the dam with dynamite. Parts of the old dam can still be seen in the bottom of the Ausable River.

Photo Gallery of Rock Glen Conservation Area

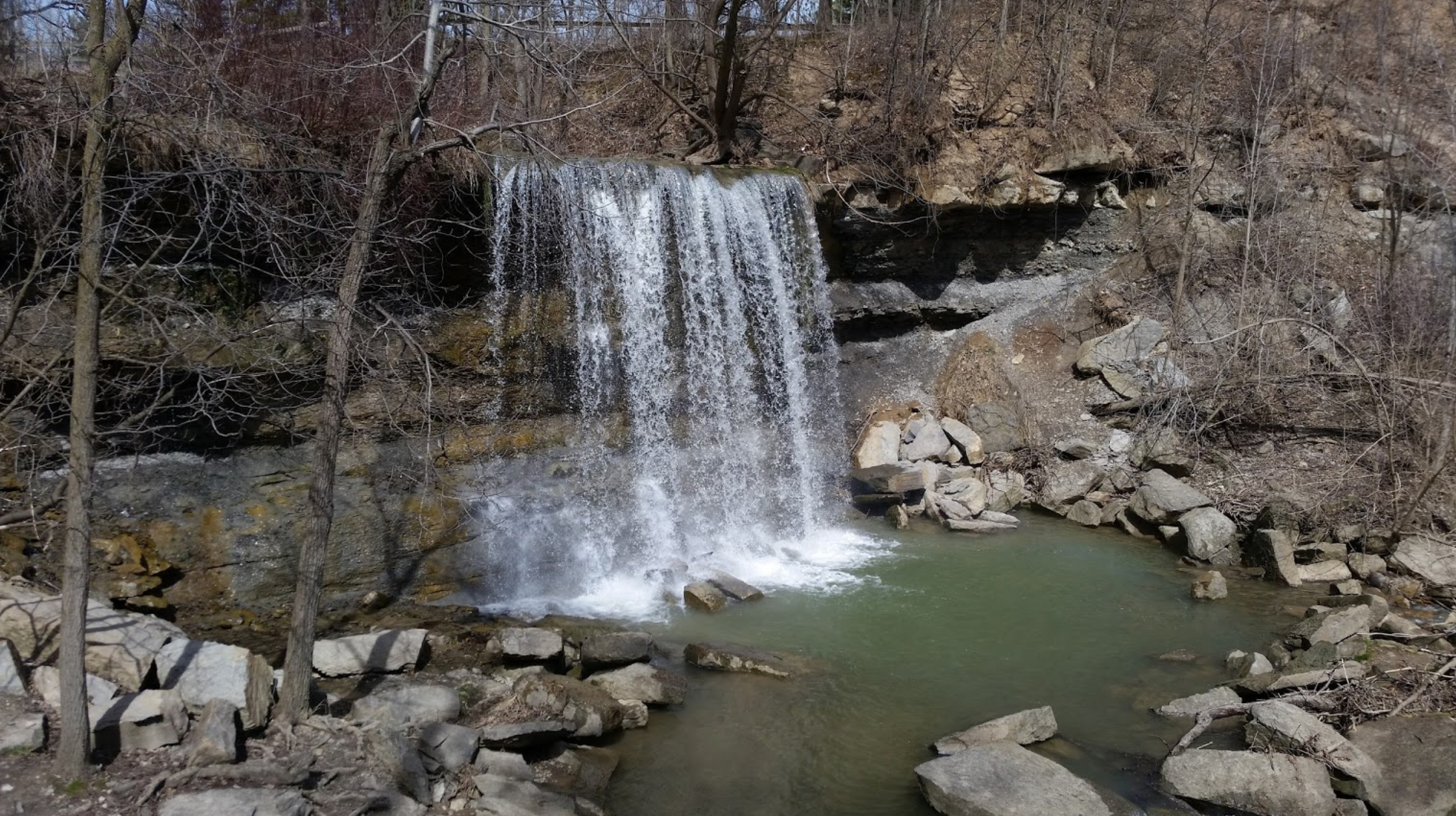
The Waterfalls

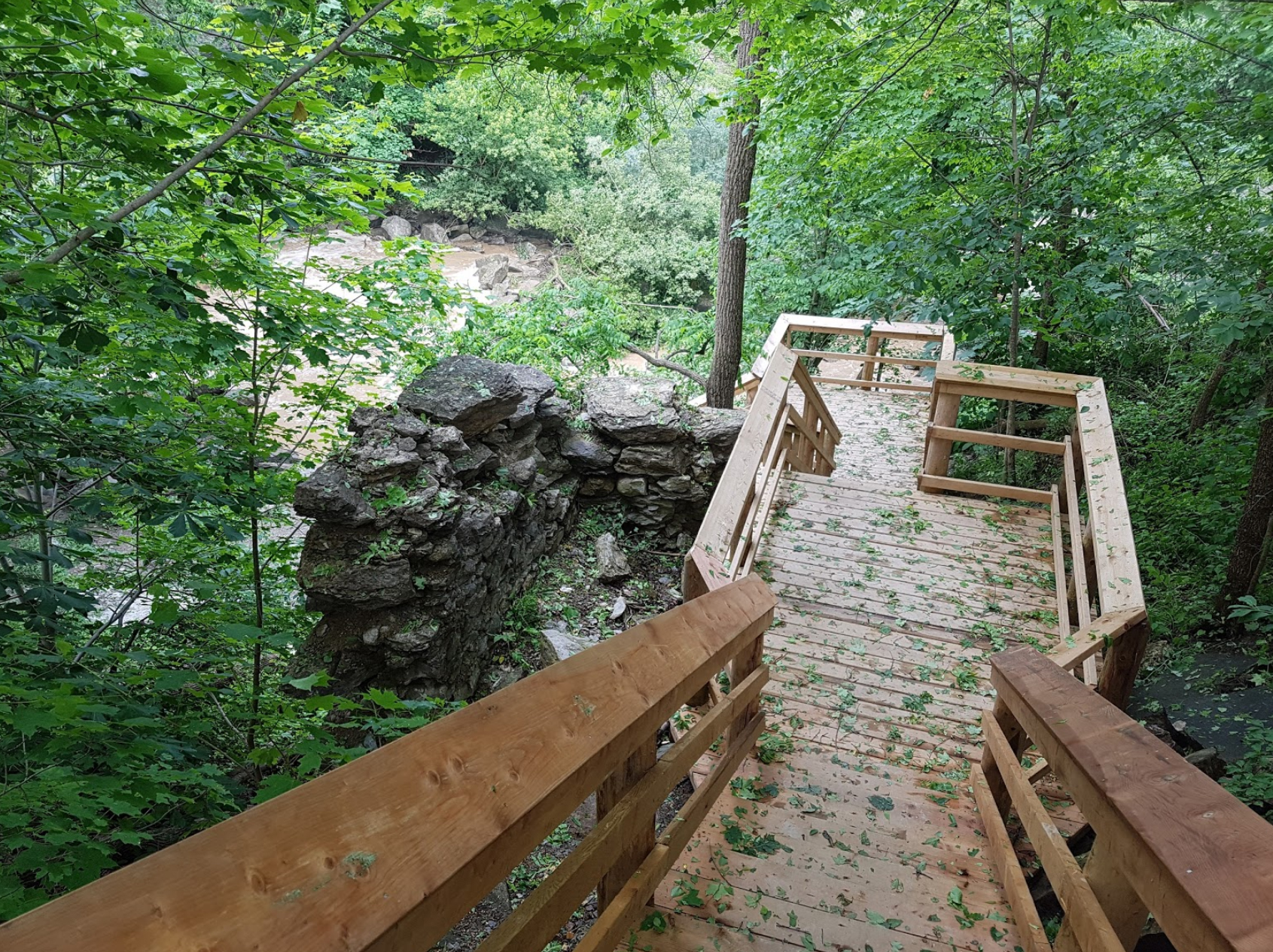
Stairs to glen

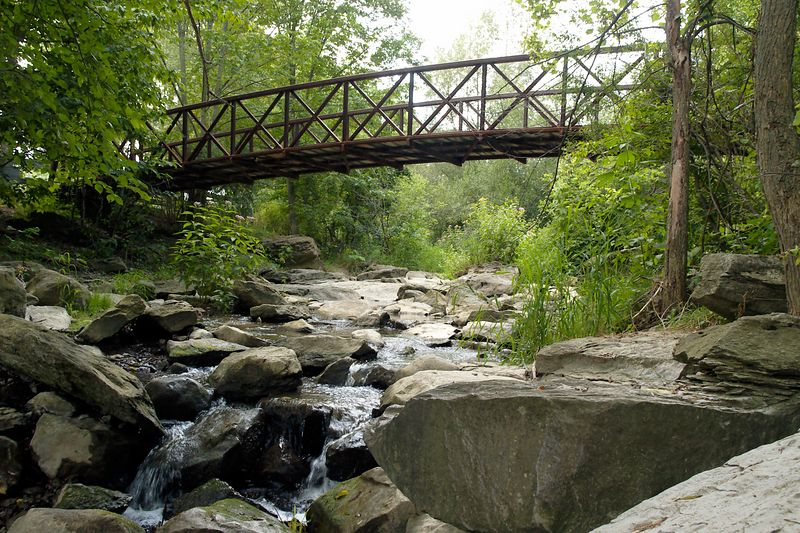
A Bridge

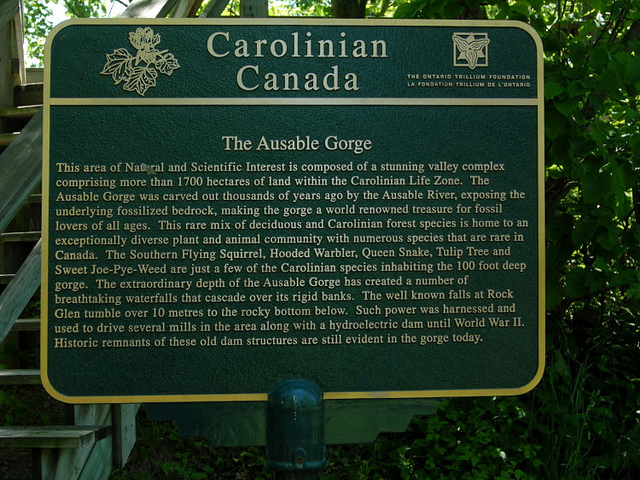
Info Plaque

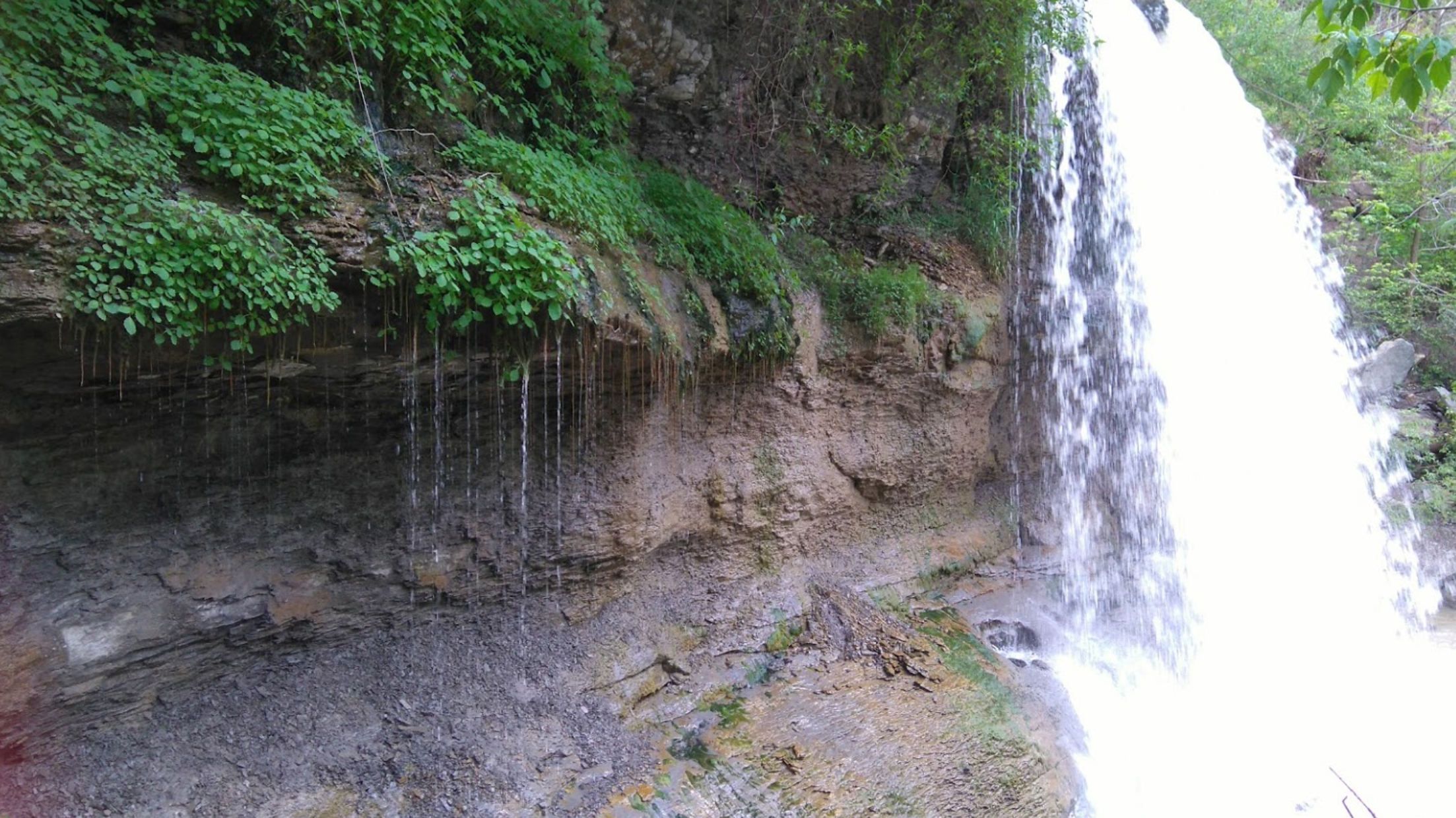
Waterfalls

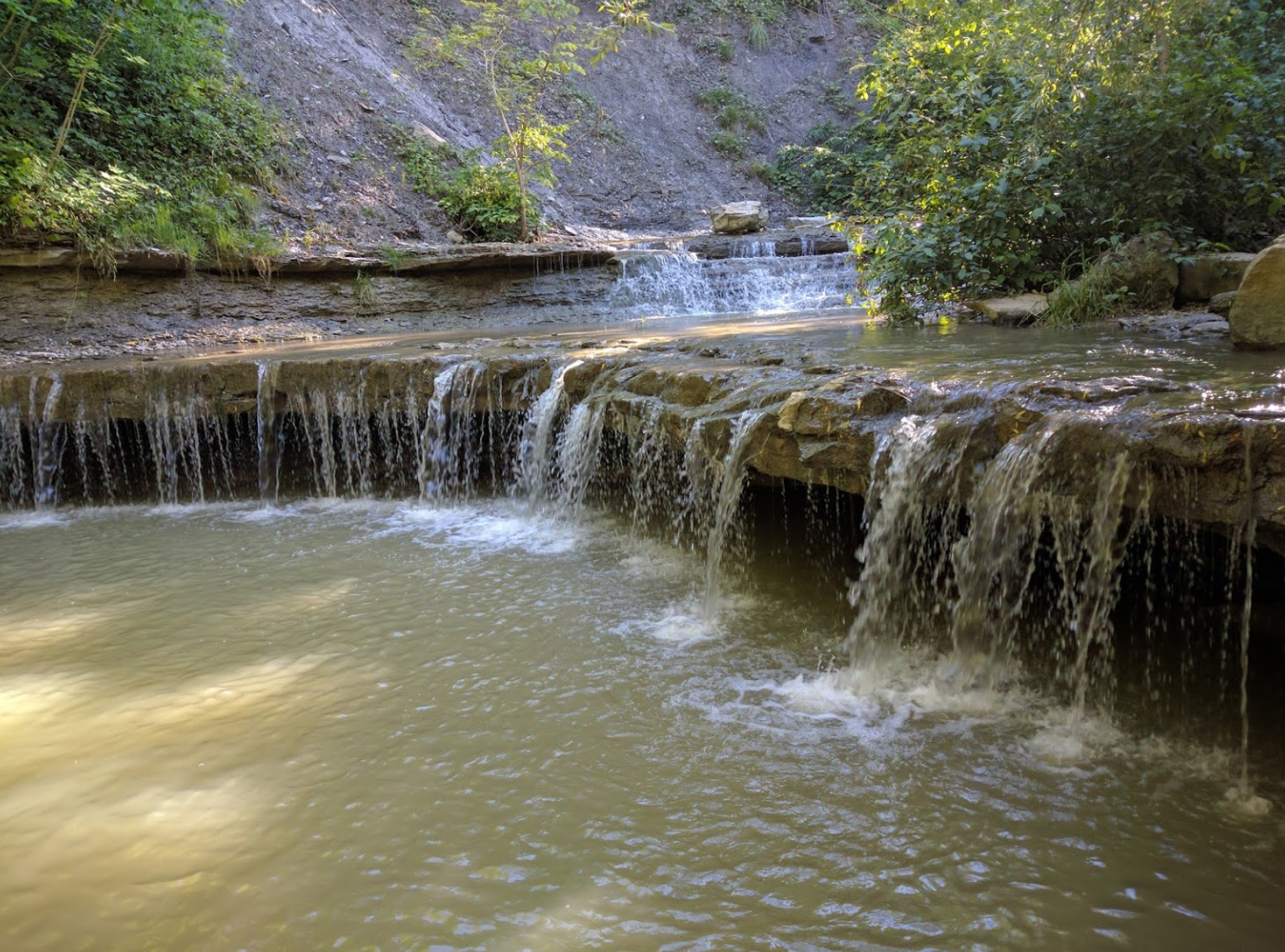
A river

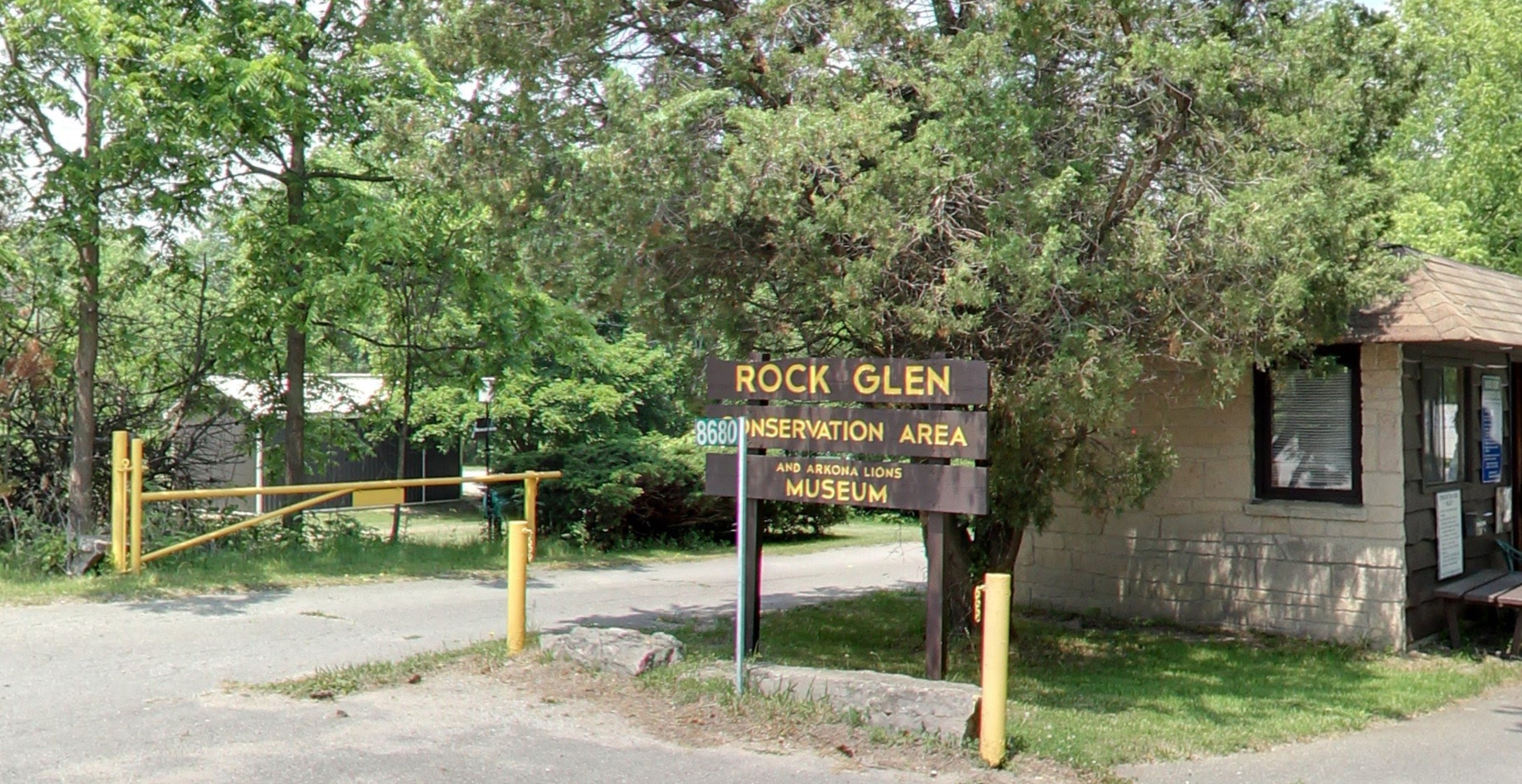
The entrance

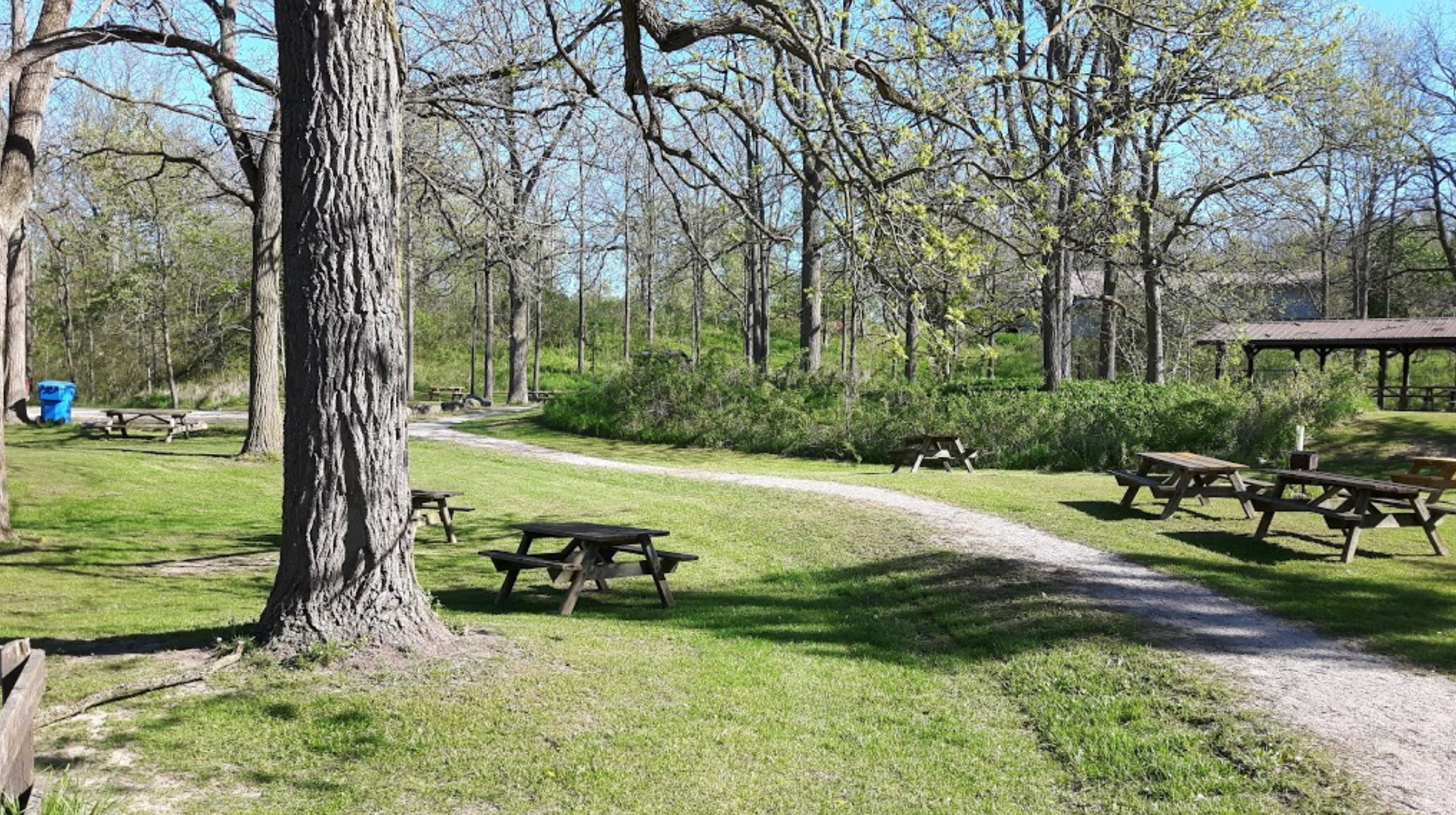
Picnic Grounds

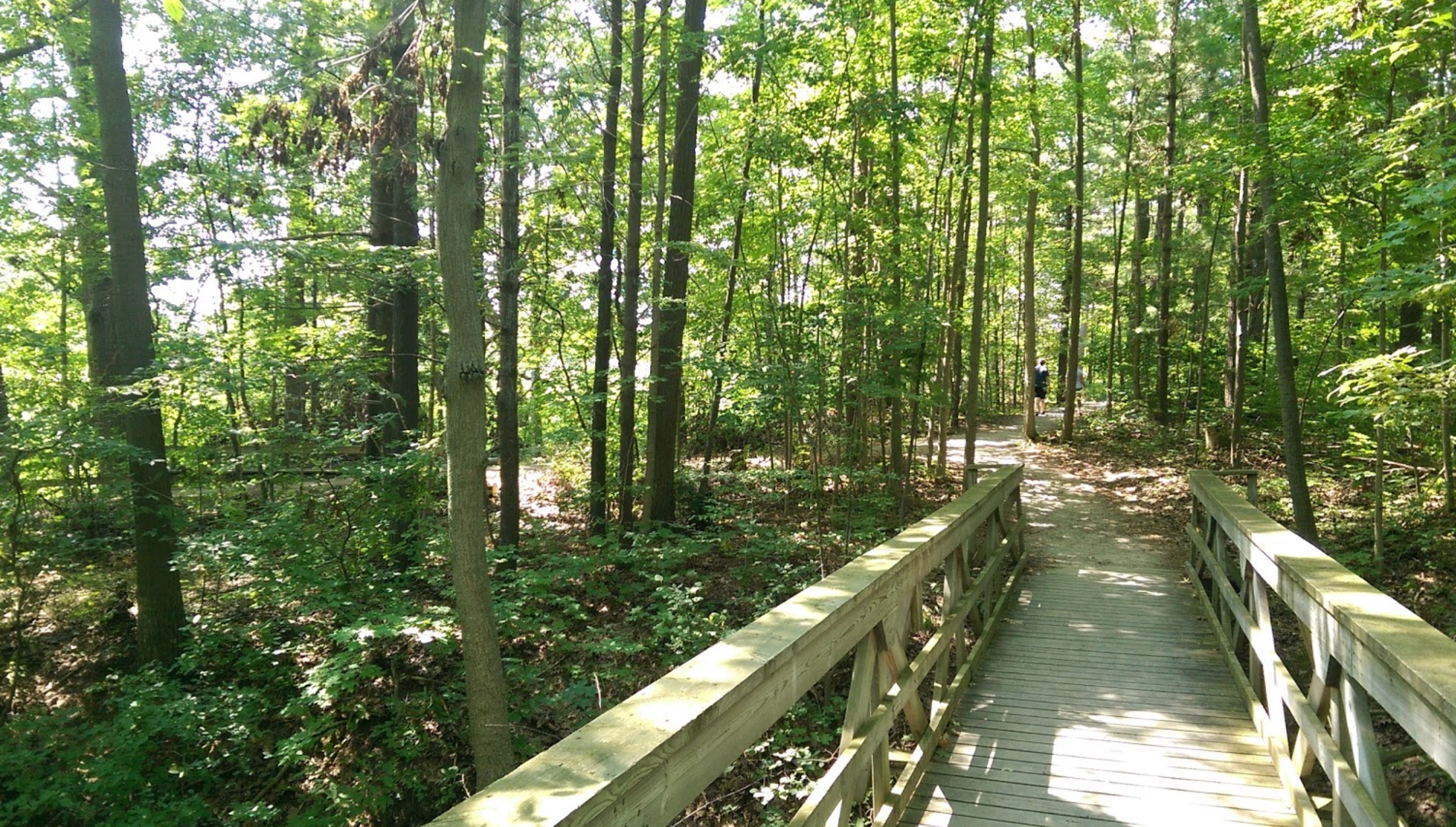
Boardwalk Trail

== Flora and fauna ==
The conservation area is home to a large diversity of species representative of both zones, and are found alongside sugar maple, beech, white elm and basswood. Some of these native trees are: sycamore, sassafras, cucumber magnolia, tulip-tree, black walnut, maple, oak, ash, pine, and pawpaw. Wildflowers are abundant, with more than 50-types found within the boundaries of the Conservation Area. Small mammals and songbirds are common. There are also examples of extinct animal life along the walls of the Ausable Gorge, small sea creatures that lived 350 million years ago. Fossils of some of these ancient animals include: brachiopods, horn corals, sponge coral, crinoids or gastropods.

The park is home to the eastern coyote, wood duck, deer, muskrat, and common garter snake.

=== Birds ===
Dozens of bird species can be seen.

- Eastern meadowlark
- Red-winged blackbird
- Bobolink
- American woodcock
- Savannah sparrow
- Rose-breasted grosbeak
- Pileated woodpecker
- Red-eyed vireo
- Blue jay
- American robin
- Great-crested flycatcher
- Hairy woodpecker
- Scarlet tanager
- Northern oriole
- Eastern kingbird
- Field sparrow
- House wren
- Yellow shafted flicker
- Indigo bunting
- Grey catbird
- Brown thrasher

== Facilities ==
Located on the conservation grounds is the Arkona Lions Museum and Information Centre, which contains a large collection of birds and wildlife preserved with traditional taxidermic methods. The museum also has a large collection of fossils and artifacts found on or near the conservation grounds, and holds presentations and guided tours there for visitors and schools. The grounds also has many stairs, boardwalks and bridges allowing visitors to safely explore the steep sides of the glen and the 10.7-metre high waterfall just upstream of the Ausable River. Many of fossils found in the exposed beds there date back 350-Million-Years; some of which include crinoids, brachiopods and trilobites, which the conservation park allows visitors to take one fossil if visibility seen without digging. There are also public washrooms, two picnic pavilions available for reservation, playground equipment by the pavilions, the lookouts located at different parts of the conservation area, and many trails for hiking. Rock Glen Conservation Area also has guided and educational hikes available for groups and schools.

Arkona Lions Museum and Information Centre

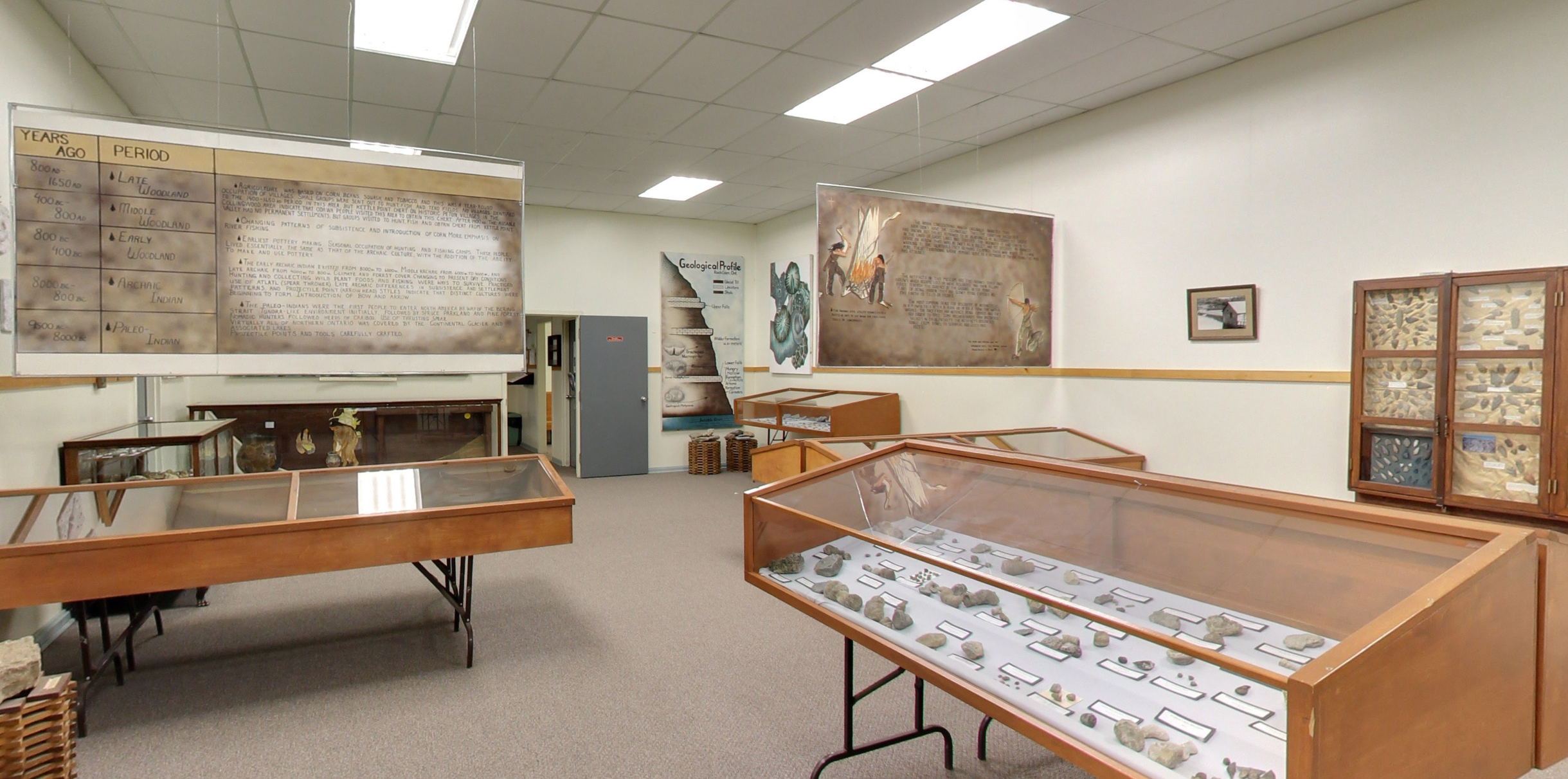
Arkona Lions Museum

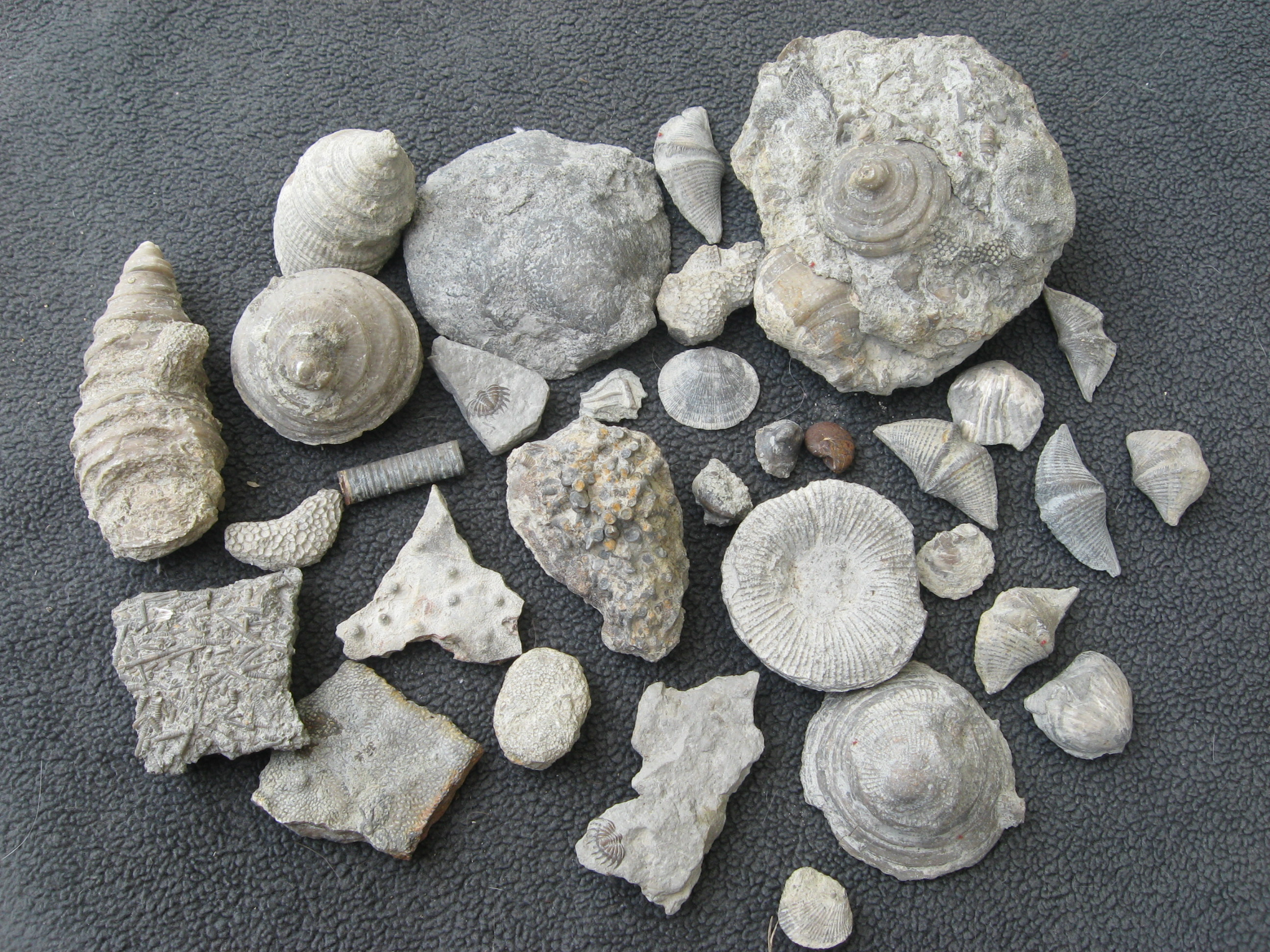
Fossils

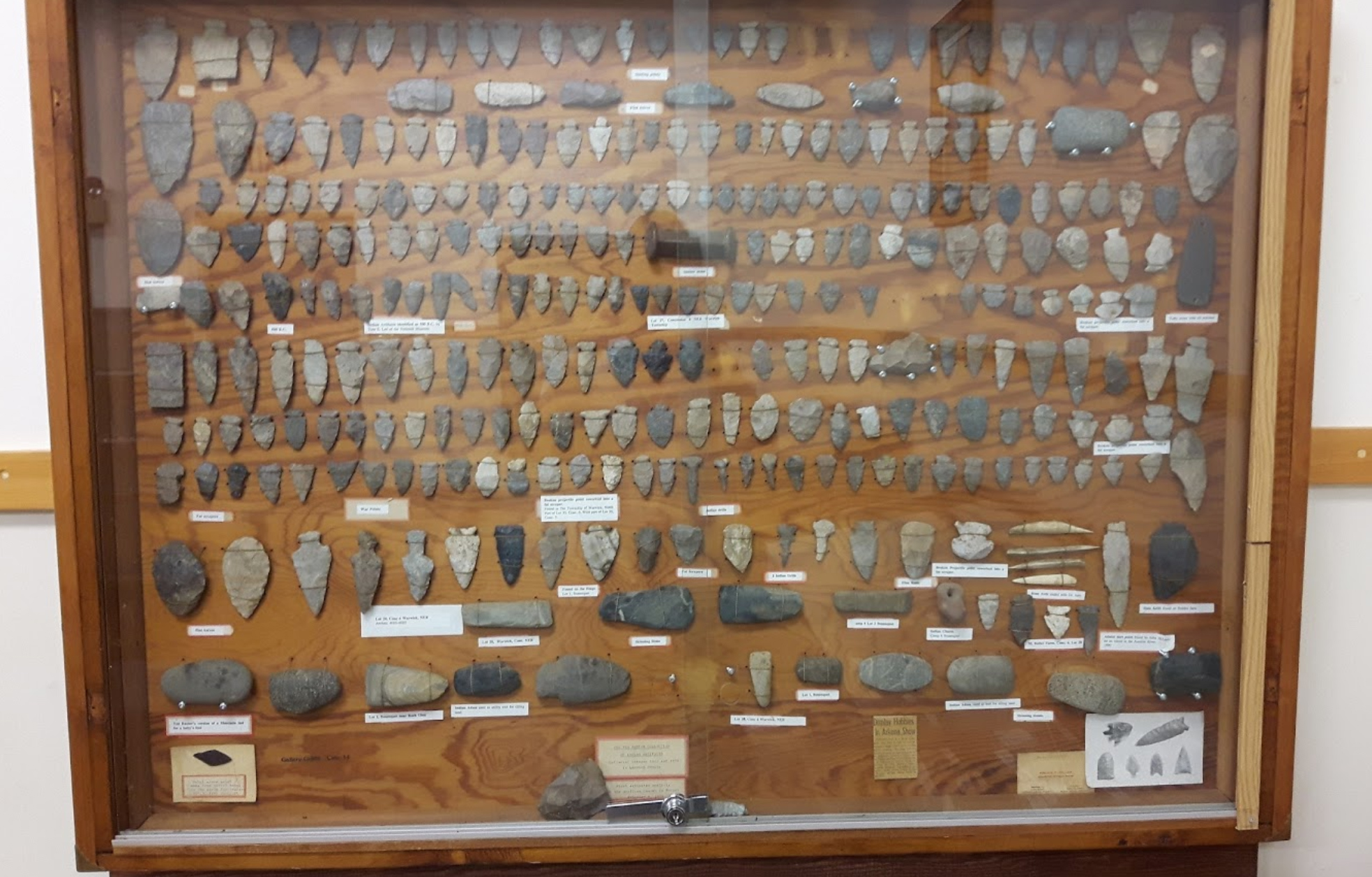
Cache Blades

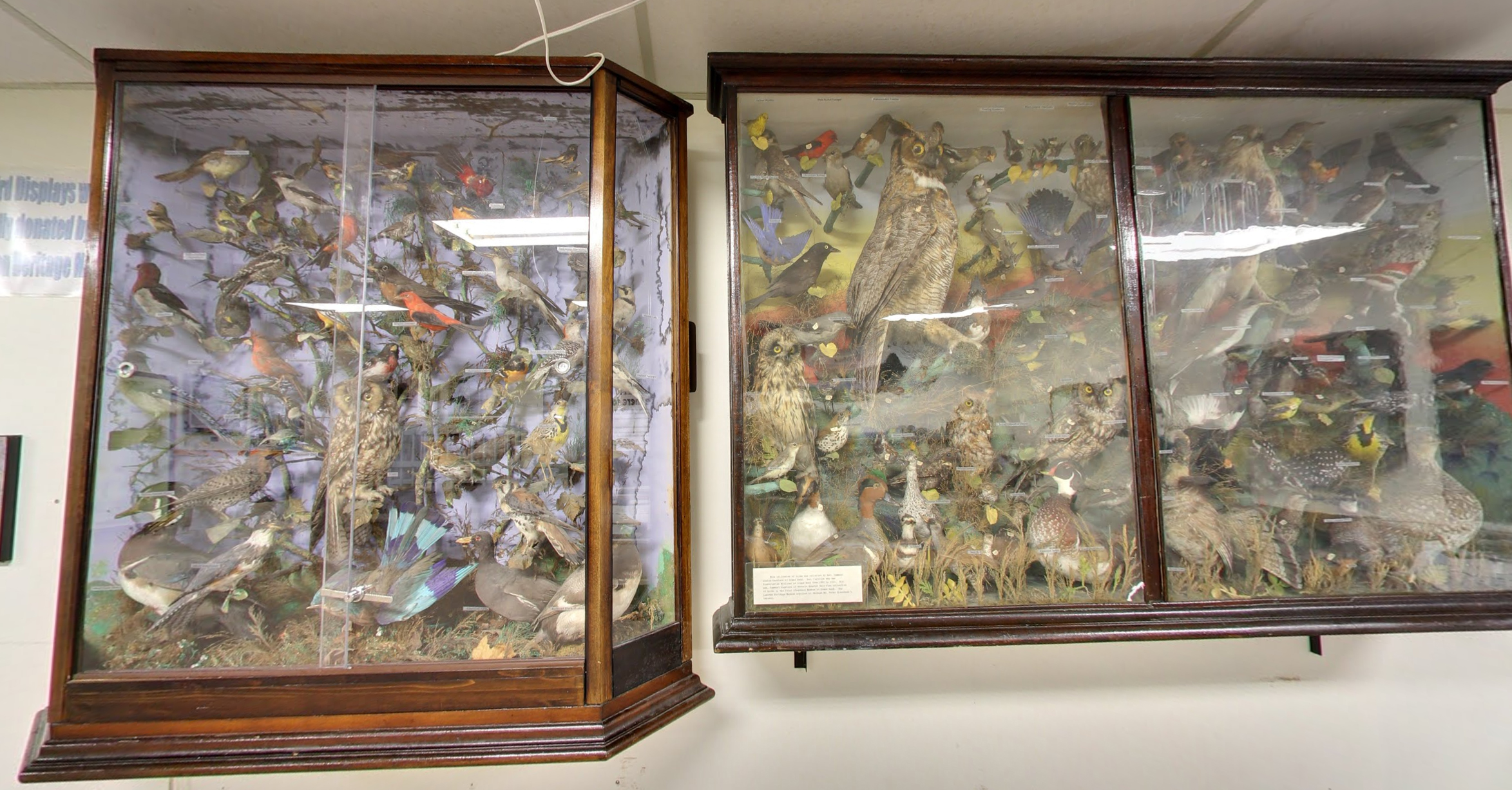
Preserved Birds

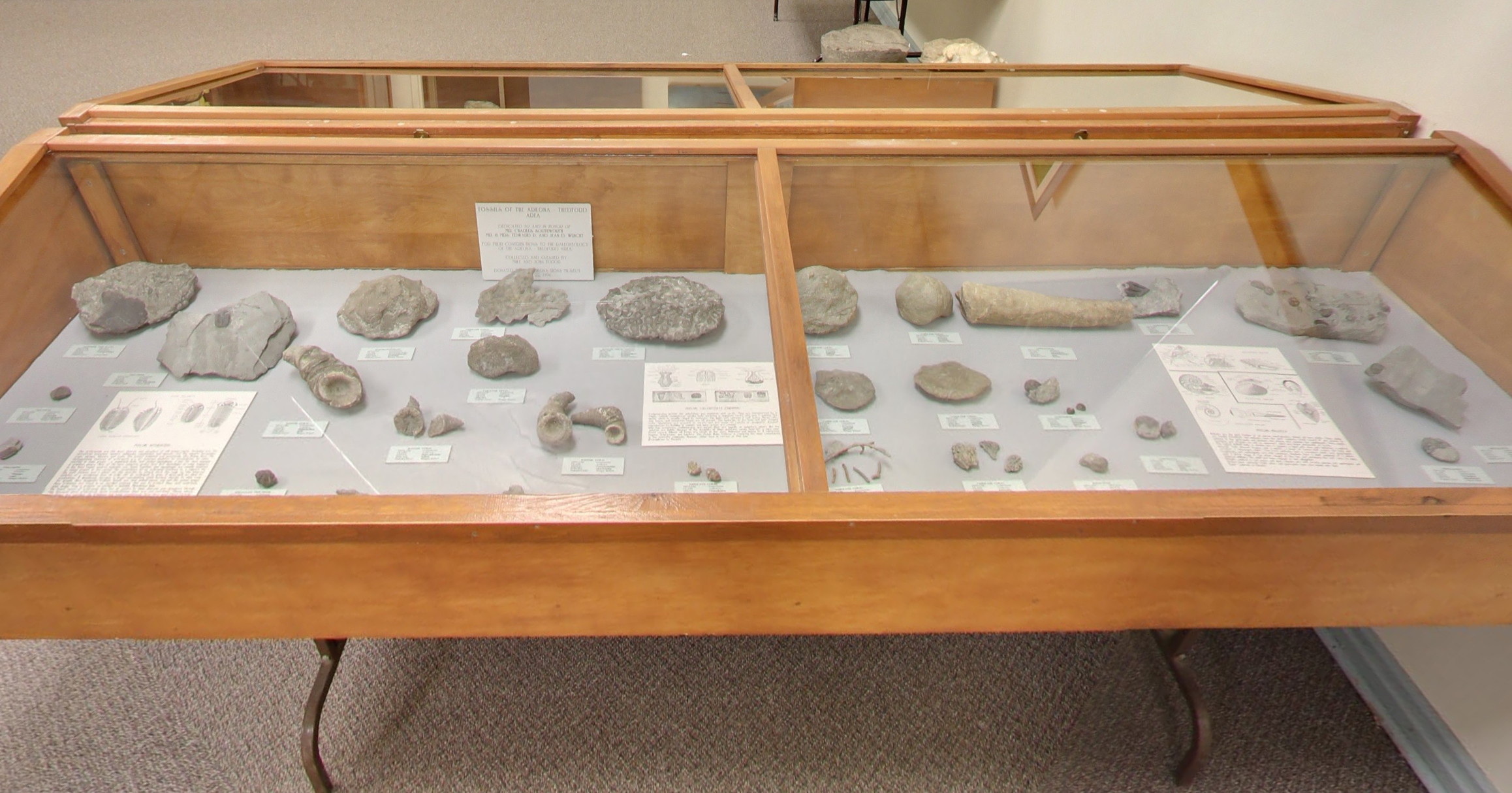
Fossils

== See also ==
- Ausable River
- Hungry Hollow Formation
- Ausable Bayfield Conservation Authority
- Devonian Era
- Pleistocene
- Timeline of Ontario history
- Paleo-Indians
- List of place names in Canada of Indigenous origin
- Lambton County
- Wisconsin Glacier
- Arkona, Ontario
- Southern Ontario
- Southwestern Ontario
- Bosanquet, Ontario
- Lambton Shores
