= Northwoods (forest) =

Boreal forest of North America

The northwoods are the boreal forest of North America, covering about half of Canada and parts of Minnesota, Wisconsin, Michigan, New York, Vermont, New Hampshire and Maine. For the part within the borders of the Midwestern United States, see Laurentian Mixed Forest Province.

== See also ==
- Boreal forest of Canada
