= Arkona, Ontario =

Coordinates: 43.073367°N 81.834111°W

Arkona is a community located in the municipality of Lambton Shores in southwestern Ontario near the Lambton–Middlesex county line, situated beside the Ausable River, on Former Kings Highway 79 (now Lambton County Road 79), Arkona is roughly halfway between Thedford, and Watford.

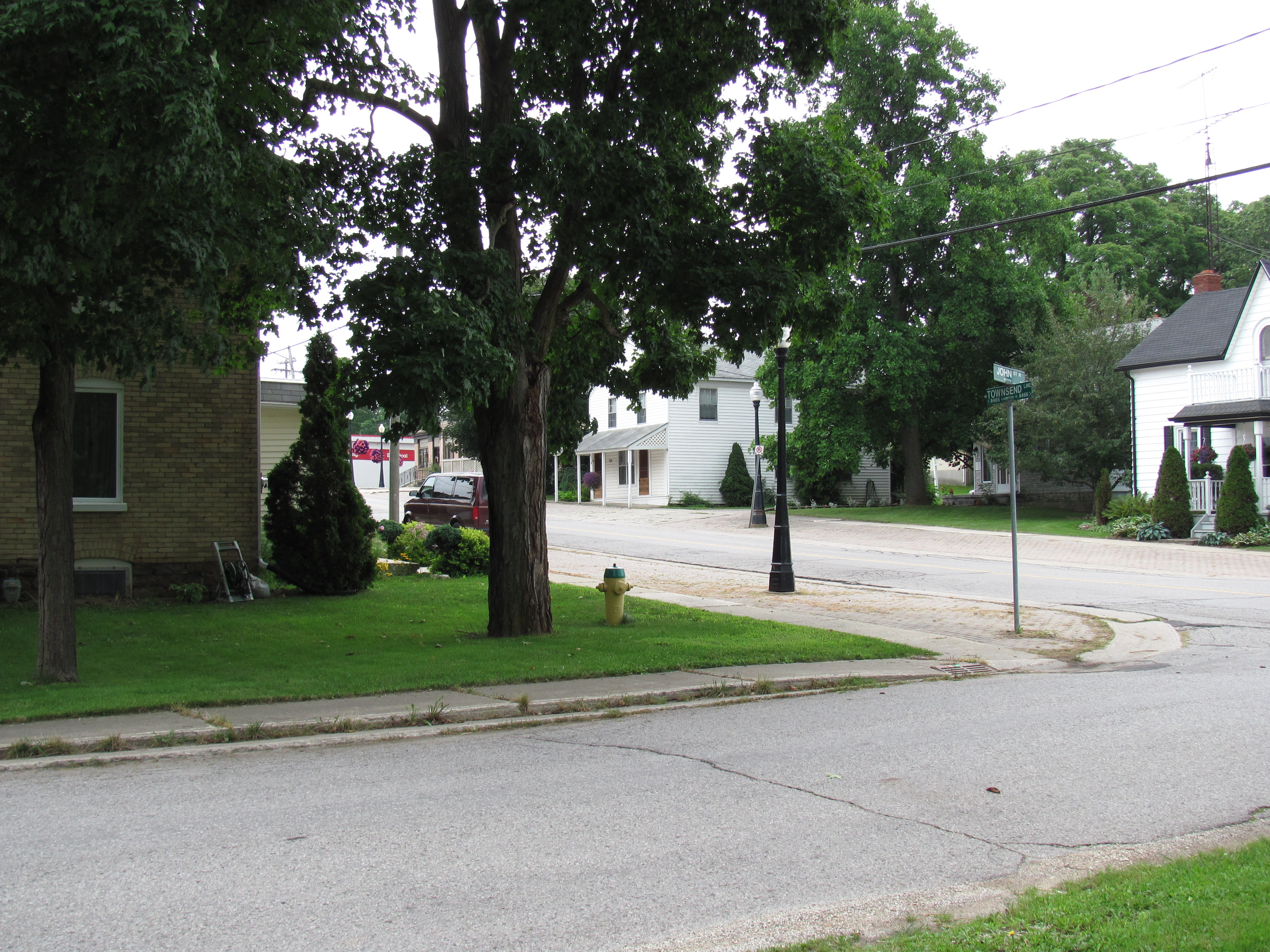
Arkona, Ontario, Canada

== History ==
=== Pre-Contact History ===
The site of the village is at the base of the Wyoming Moraine which formed along the shores of ancient Lake Arkona during the retreat of the Wisconsin Glacier some 16,000 years ago. Rich deposits of fossils are revealed at nearby Hungry Hollow. Evidence of early human habitation exists at the site of Paleo hunting camps which were found just a kilometre south of Arkona dating back some 11,000 years. Subsequent migrations of Archaic and Woodland peoples moved into the area as the climate and vegetation changed. Evidence of this long-standing habitation is frequently discovered in the fields surrounding the current village.

=== Arrival of European settlers ===
The first known permanent settlers of European background were Asa Townsend (c.1775–alive 1851) and his wife Huldah Barstow, who first settled in Westminster Township near what became the City of London, Ontario. After his lands ultimately became incorporated in London's Springbank Park, Townsend and his wife removed westward in 1821. They settled east of present-day Arkona on the banks of the Ausable River in what later became Bosanquet Township in Lambton County. Townsend operated a salt well there, and remained in the area as late as 1851, living next door to his son Ezekiel Townsend.

In 1833, the Townsends were joined by Henry Utter (1809–1898), who settled on a farm in the recently surveyed Warwick Township, across the township line from Bosanquet. Utter was subsequently joined by members of the Smith and Eastman families and a settlement gradually grew up that straddled the Warwick-Bosanquet Township line. (Utter married Harriet Smith (1816–1882) who was part of the extended Smith family). The Eastmans and one branch of the Smith family were the ancestors of Alexander Phimister Proctor who was born in the village in 1860.

The village was surveyed in 1851 and known variously as Bosanquet Corners, Eastman Corners and Smithfield. In 1857, it was renamed 'Arkona' after the rugged cape on the Baltic Island of Rügen, a name suggested by resident cabinet maker Ephraim Brower and possibly by the incumbent postmaster Levi Schooley. The village continued to grow and develop so that by the 1870s, with hopes of attracting a railway, the community incorporated in June 1876. While its population surpassed 700, the failure to attract a railway led to a population decline and the loss of its first known newspaper, the East Lambton Advocate, which moved to the nearby railway village of Watford. (Hopes of securing a rail link continued to surface at least as late as 1911, when one resident wrote, "They are talking of a railroad for Arkona [which] they think is sure to come but [we] will see when it gets here."). Even without the railway, however, Arkona remained an important service centre for the surrounding rural farming district and boasted many important industries such as a basket factory, woolen mill, apple evaporator, and a series of mills. Various businesses continued to service the local area including numerous stores and other enterprises.

=== Recent history ===
The advent of the automobile lessened local dependence on the village and its services, and led to gradual yet dramatic changes to Arkona's makeup, especially in the post-World War II era. Its school closed in 1973 and all village students then attended Bosanquet Township Central School. Since the 1880s, the village has maintained a population hovering around 500. Two mainstays have long been Arkona's Baptist Church (begun in 1840) and Arkona United Church, the successor to Arkona's Episcopal and Wesleyan Methodist Churches, both of which began in the 1850s (the Wesleyan Methodist Church building, started in 1862, remained the home of the United Church congregation until its closure in January 2008). Similarly the community is served by the Plymouth Brethren chapel, Elim Hall. Despite the changes and loss of many local enterprises, the community still boasts a dental office, optometrists, a medical clinic, a grocery store, gas station, and several retail outlets. Various fruit orchards continue to attract many to the community for fresh fruit. Rock Glen Conservation Area, located just north of the village, continues to attract tourists to the area and was the site of the Rock Glen Power Company's generator and dam on the Ausable from 1907 to 1926. It was taken over by Ontario Hydro and the dam was subsequently destroyed. Villagers celebrated the centennial of their community's incorporation in July 1976, with some two thousand people in attendance. A smaller celebration marked the 125 anniversary in 2001, although earlier that year the municipality had been amalgamated with Bosanquet Township (including the communities of Ipperwash and Port Franks, Ontario), the Town of Forest and Villages of Thedford and Grand Bend to form the new entity of Lambton Shores.

== Demographics ==
In the 2021 Census of Population conducted by Statistics Canada, Arkona had a population of 648 living in 279 of its 283 total private dwellings, a change of 2.2% from its 2016 population of 634. With a land area of 2.53 km^{2} (0.98 sq mi), it had a population density of 256.1/km^{2} (663.4/sq mi) in 2021.
