= Mixed Wood Plains Ecozone =

Areas in Canada and the US

The Mixed Wood Plains Ecozone is an ecozone of North America that was defined by the Commission for Environmental Cooperation to reconcile the American and Canadian land classification systems. According to the CEC, the Mixed Wood Plains of North America is a Level II Ecoregion 8.1, which includes the Mixedwood Plains of Canada, and the adjoining areas of the United States such as the Eastern Great Lakes and Hudson Lowlands ecoregion. However, the CEC atlas also includes areas of Wisconsin, Maine and New Brunswick in the Mixed Wood Plain ecoregion.

The United States uses a different terminology to Canada; the corresponding Level I ecoregion of the United States Environmental Protection Agency system is the Eastern Temperate Forest ecoregion. To deal with the differences in names between Canada and the United States, the Commission for Environmental Cooperation has produced a continental atlas, in which the Mixed Wood Plains is a Level II Ecoregion 8.1; this includes the above areas within Canada, as well as adjoining parts of the United States.
