= John E. Pearce Provincial Park =

Provincial park and nature reserve in Ontario, Canada

- IUCN category Ia (strict nature reserve)
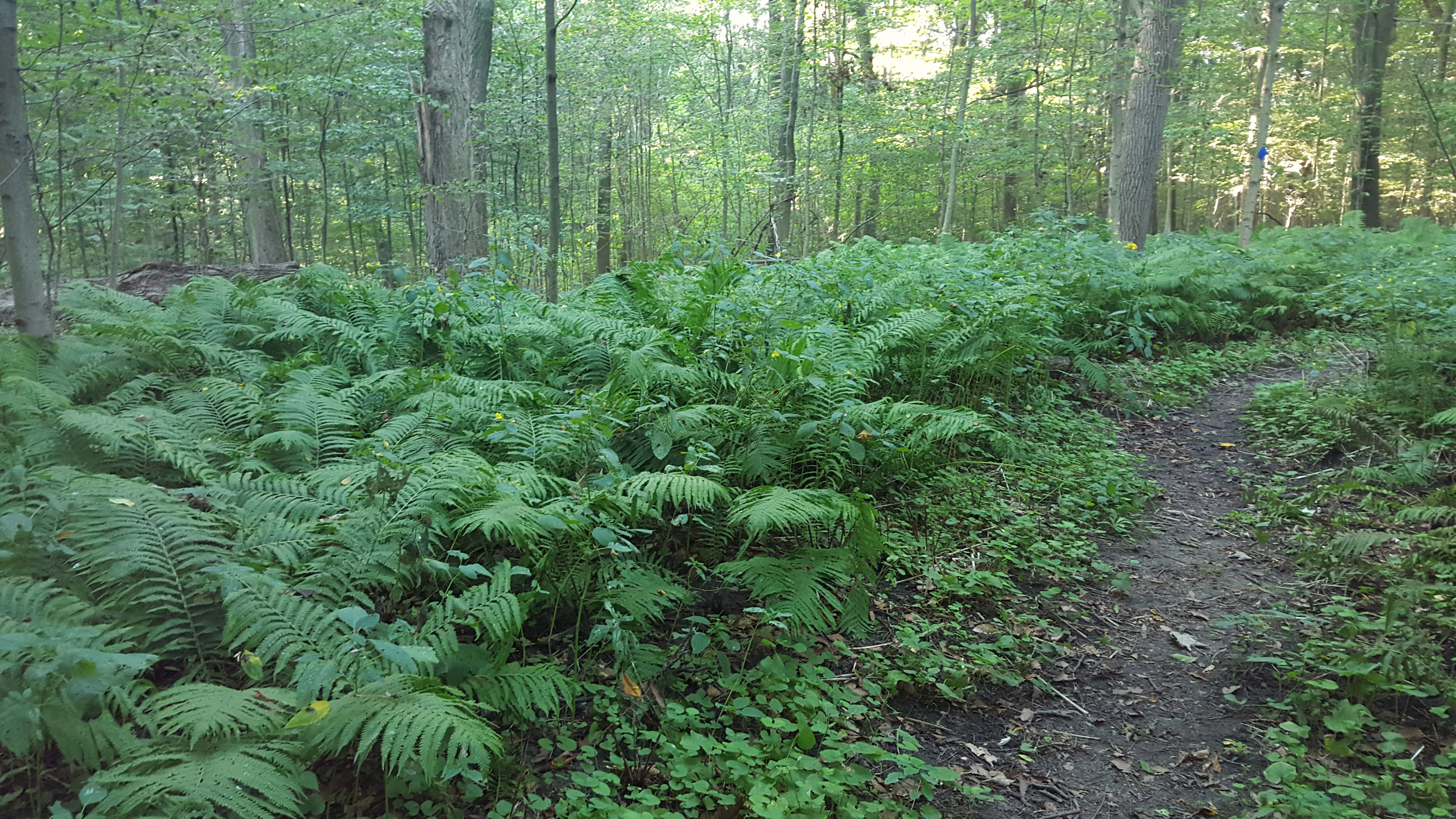
- Location: Elgin County, Ontario, Canada
- Nearest city: Port Burwell, Ontario
- Area: 67.99 ha (168.0 acres)
- Established: 1957
- Visitors: 12,415 (in 2022)
- Governing body: Ontario Parks

John E. Pearce Provincial Park is located in the Carolinian forest zone of southwestern Ontario, Canada, covering 67.9 hectares (168 acres) on the north shore of Lake Erie in Elgin County, and is one of two protected areas in the Southwest Elgin Forest Complex subzone. It has been a protected area since 1957.

The land was a farmstead with cultivated fields and a woodlot enclosing a gullied area. The soils are complex associations of lacustrine material ranging in texture from clay to loamy fine sand and overlie fine-textured till which is exposed in gullies. Sugar maple dominates the woodlot which is lent exceptional diversity by the frequent presence of American beech, ironwood, plus species of hickory, ash and walnut and many herbaceous species. Also present are tulip tree and sassafras. Black locust was planted in the gully; although this species is alien, it will remain uncut to minimize further erosion.
