= Rock Point Provincial Park =

Provincial park in Ontario, Canada

- IUCN category II (national park)
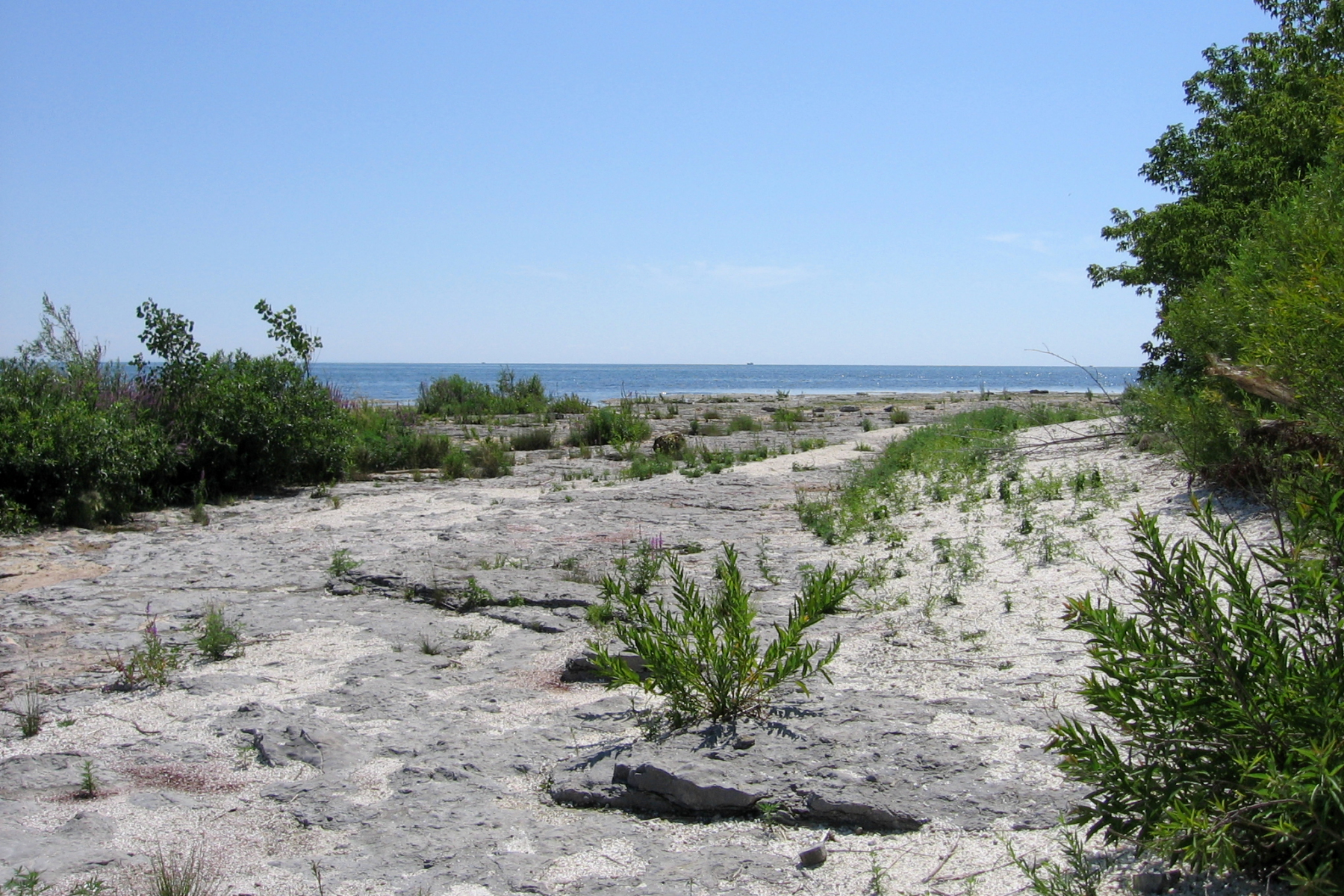
- A shore in the park with many fossils.

- Location within Southern Ontario
- Interactive map of Rock Point Provincial Park
- Location: Haldimand County, Ontario, Canada
- Coordinates: 42°50′54″N 79°33′09″W
- Area: 1.87 km^{2} (0.72 sq mi)
- Established: 1957
- Visitors: 86,112 (in 2022)
- Governing body: Ontario Parks
- Website: www.ontarioparks.ca/park/rockpoint

Rock Point Provincial Park is a park located on the north shore of Lake Erie near the mouth of the Grand River in the Carolinian zone of southwestern Ontario. It occupies an area of 1.87 square kilometres (0.72 sq mi).

Habitats within the park include wetlands, forests and dunes. Trees include the uncommon Big Shellbark Hickory. Limestone shelves along the lake shore contain the fossils of marine animals from the Devonian period. The fossil beds also contain deposits of chert, a stone similar to flint which was worked to produce stone points. An archeological survey of the park revealed a late paleo-Indian camp, which showed evidence that the people were working the chert as well as fishing in the lake.

Located above the fossil beds is a red clay bluff which separates the campgrounds from the Lake.

There is also a sandy beach for swimming.

A bird banding station has been set up for monitoring bird migration.
