= Bois Beckett Forest =

Old maple grove and beech forest in Sherbrooke, Quebec, Canada

Coordinates: 45.4186°N 71.9309°W

Beckett Woods Park (French: Parc du Bois-Beckett) is an old maple grove and beech forest in Sherbrooke, a city in southern Quebec. Covering 70 hectares, it is one of only two protected urban forests in the province and is particularly known for its rich variety of flora and fauna. The forest has 30 other tree species in addition to its groves of maple and beech and also contains clumps of hemlock. Beckett Woods is thought to be about 270 years old and has been recognized by the Quebec Ministry of Natural Resources and Wildlife as an old-growth forest. Ornithologists from all over Quebec gather for an annual meeting in the park which contains 103 different bird species. With its six kilometres of marked trails the park is also popular with hikers and cross-country skiers.

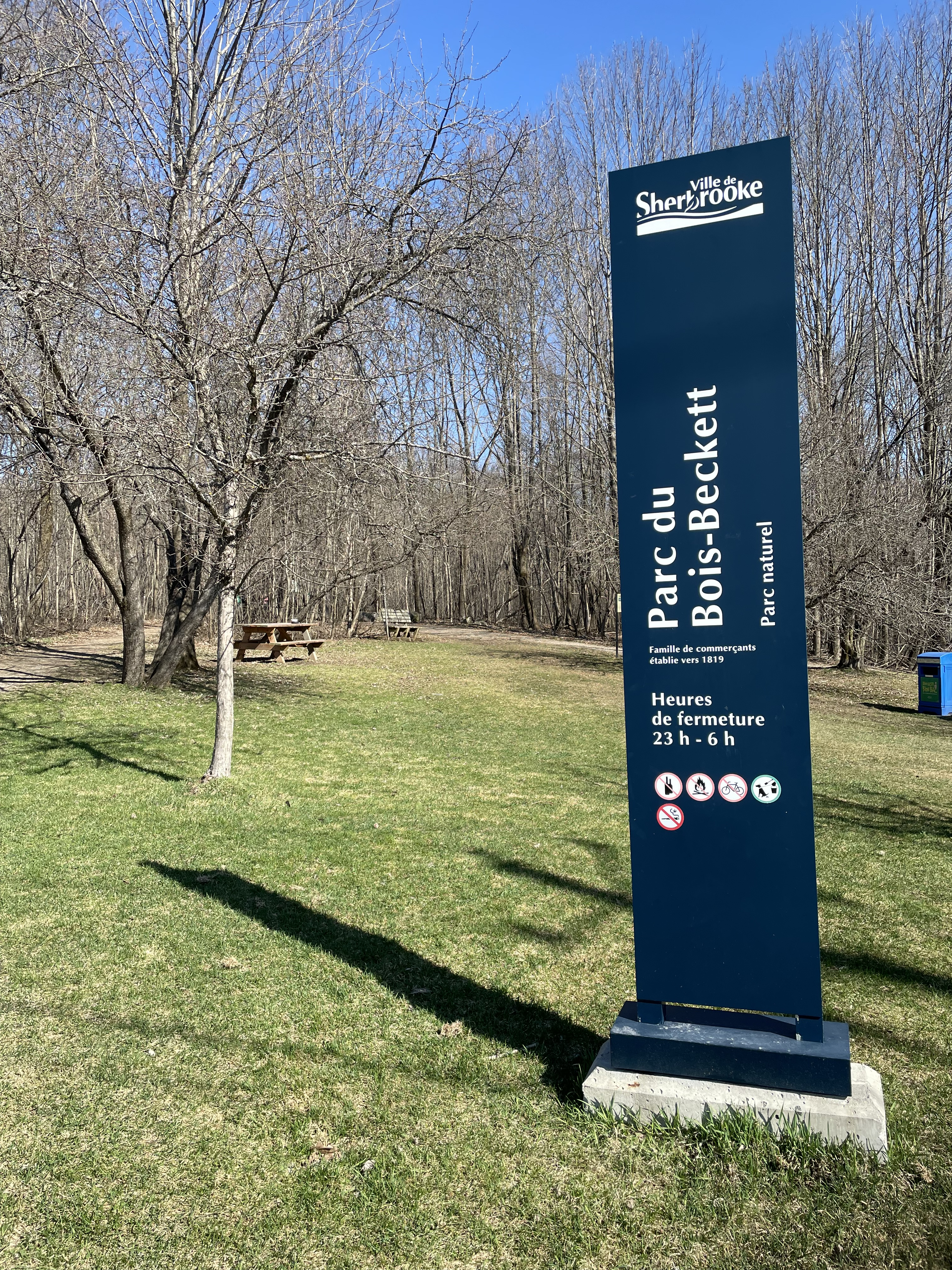
Bois-Beckett forest, Sherbrooke, 2023.

== History ==
The forest was originally owned by Major Henry Beckett, who purchased a large tract of land in Sherbrooke in 1834. Much of it was converted to pasture and agricultural use, but the forest, now known as Beckett Woods, was left intact. Its maple groves produced 900 pounds of maple sugar per year. The forest remained in the Beckett family until 1963, when it was acquired by the City of Sherbrooke to protect it from property developers. The association Regroupement du Bois Beckett was formed in 1984 to administer the site and ensure its conservation.
