= Bosanquet, Ontario =

Coordinates: 43°10′03″N 81°54′08″W

Interactive map pinpointing Bosanquet

Bosanquet (/boʊˈsænkwɛt/) is a former township of Lambton County in Ontario, Canada located northeast of Sarnia.

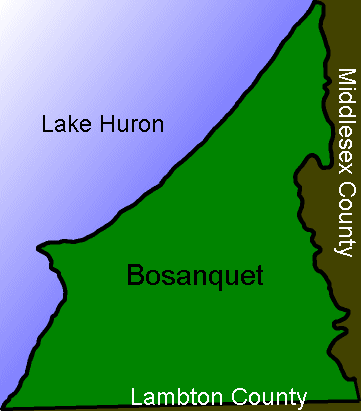
A map of Bosanquet township

== Geography and history ==
Home to Native Americans for thousands of years, the first Europeans settled on the lakeshore in the early 19th century. It would not be until later in the century when the Grand Trunk Railway was extended through the region that farming would dominate the landscape. Bosanquet once covered all of Lambton County north of Townsend Line (named after early settler Asa Townsend). However, after various municipal incorporations in the late 19th century portions of the township were removed to form the town of Forest, and the villages of Thedford and Arkona, Ontario, and later in the 20th century Grand Bend. Port Franks was a major community within its boundaries but was never incorporated as a separate municipality. The township was permanently populated by over 10,000 people, most of them farmers or living in communities that provided services for farmers. In the summer months, however, the population would spike dramatically due to vacationers who flocked to the beaches of the Pinery Provincial Park and the communities of Grand Bend and Port Franks.

== Dismantling the township ==
During the 1990s a Progressive Conservative government came to power in the provincial legislature. To save administration costs, the township was declared a town by the new provincial government. Then, in an effort to save more money, the township was amalgamated with nearby towns and parts of other townships. The new Municipality of Lambton Shores was designated a city, and did indeed save about $100,000 each year. Despite this, the move was unpopular with many local residents.

== Flora and fauna ==
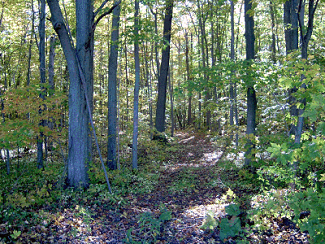
A typical forest in early fall.

Most of former Bosanquet falls inside the Carolinian Life Zone, a region of temperate deciduous forests that encompasses the east part of North America from the south-eastern U.S. to southern Ontario. The term Carolinian Life Zone originally applied only to the Carolinas, but the same species of plants and animals can be found anywhere the term is used, including Ontario.

It is home to the most diverse assortment of species in Canada. Over 2000 plant species and 400 bird species have been recorded. Unique to the area, within Canada, are trees like the chestnut and walnut, but Canadian mainstays like maple and oak are prominent as well.

Today, most of the forest has been cleared to make room for farming; only about 10% remains standing. The forest that remains has been isolated into stands of a few dozen acres (a fraction of a square km) each, surrounded by fields and pastures. Because of this extensive agriculture, black bears, eastern wolves and about 35 species of plants have been extirpated. The only widespread large mammals remaining are white-tailed deer.
