= Southwest Elgin Forest Complex =

Forests of Ontario

The Southwest Elgin Forest Complex comprises a 20-kilometer subzone of discontinuous woodlots in southern Ontario within 5 kilometres of the Lake Erie shoreline from John E. Pearce Provincial Park at the eastern end to the Elgin-Kent county border at the western end. Mature forests are often dominated by American beech and sugar maple with a notable presence of species, including sassafras and tulip tree, which are restricted to the Carolinian forest region. Some rare birds are present, most notably hooded warbler in woods and Acadian flycatcher in ravines.
