= Laurentian Mixed Forest Province =

Forested ecoregion in North America

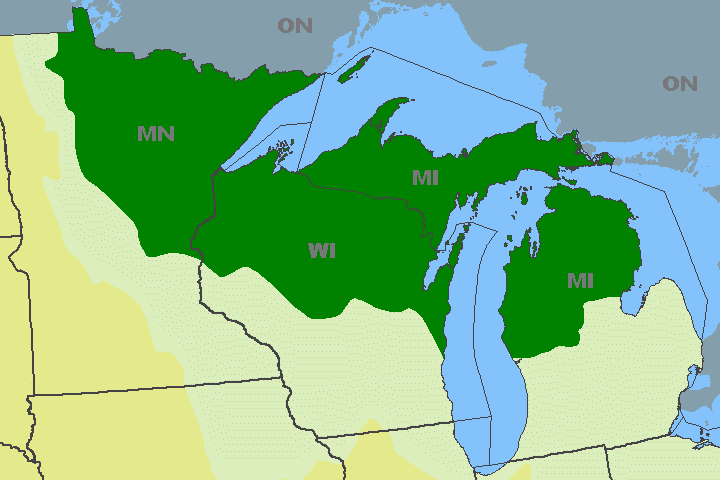
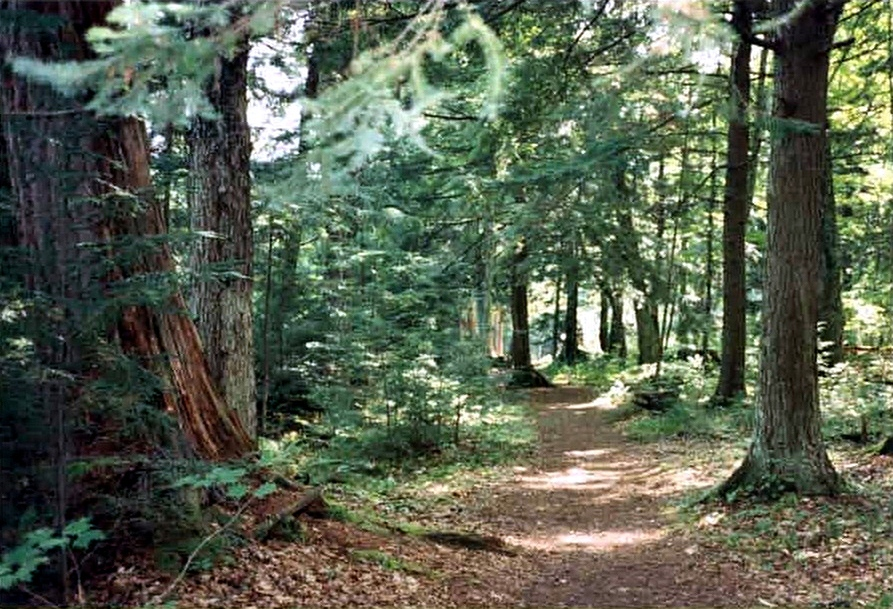
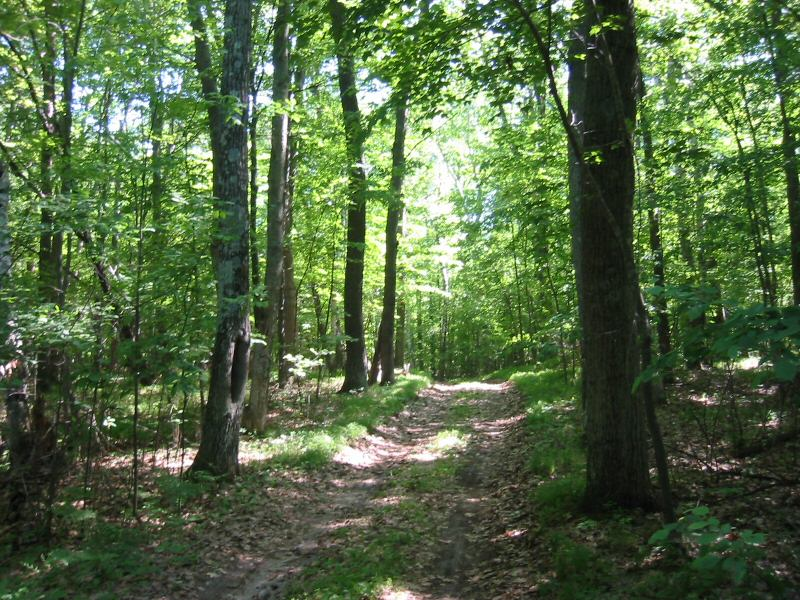
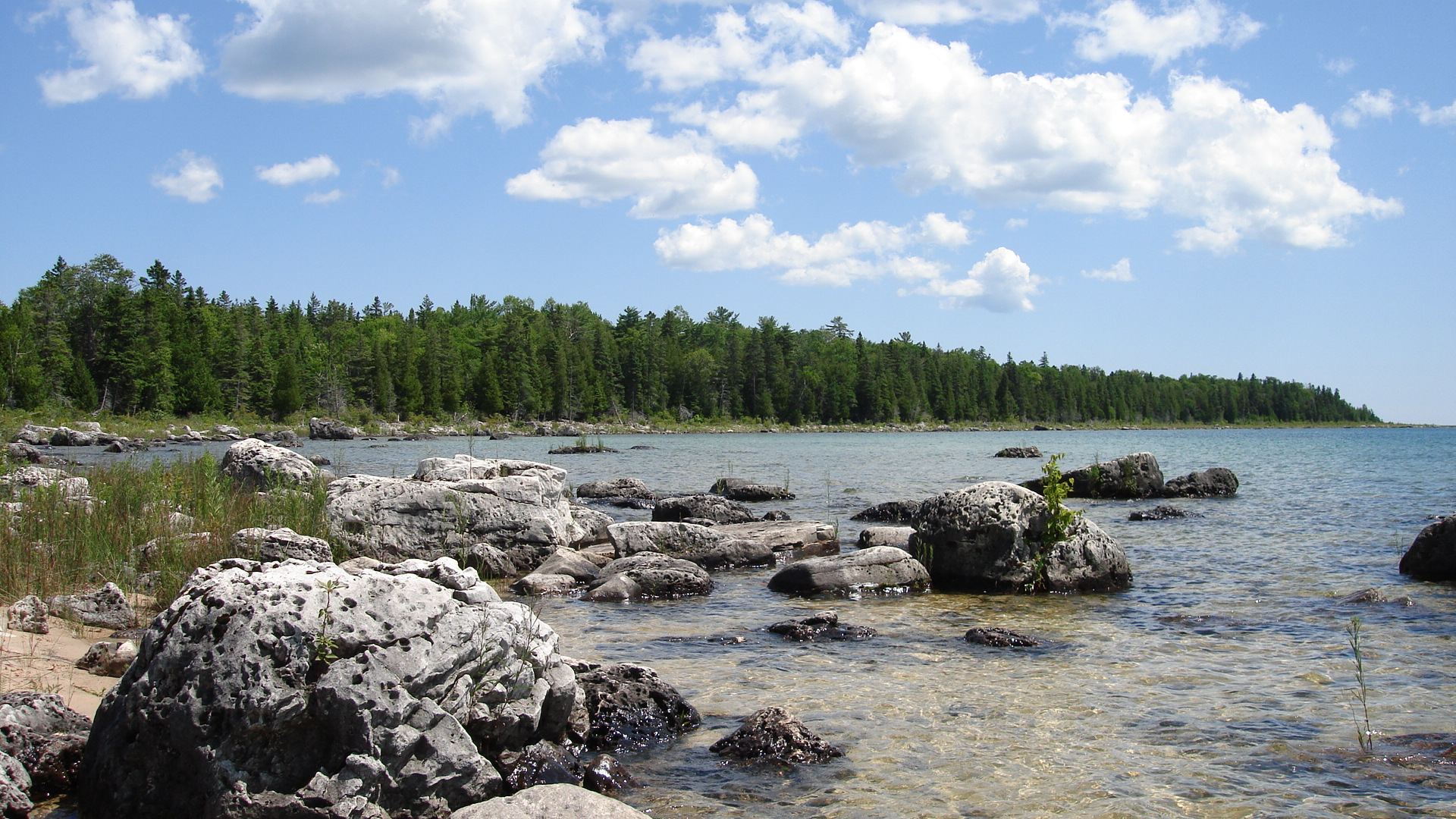
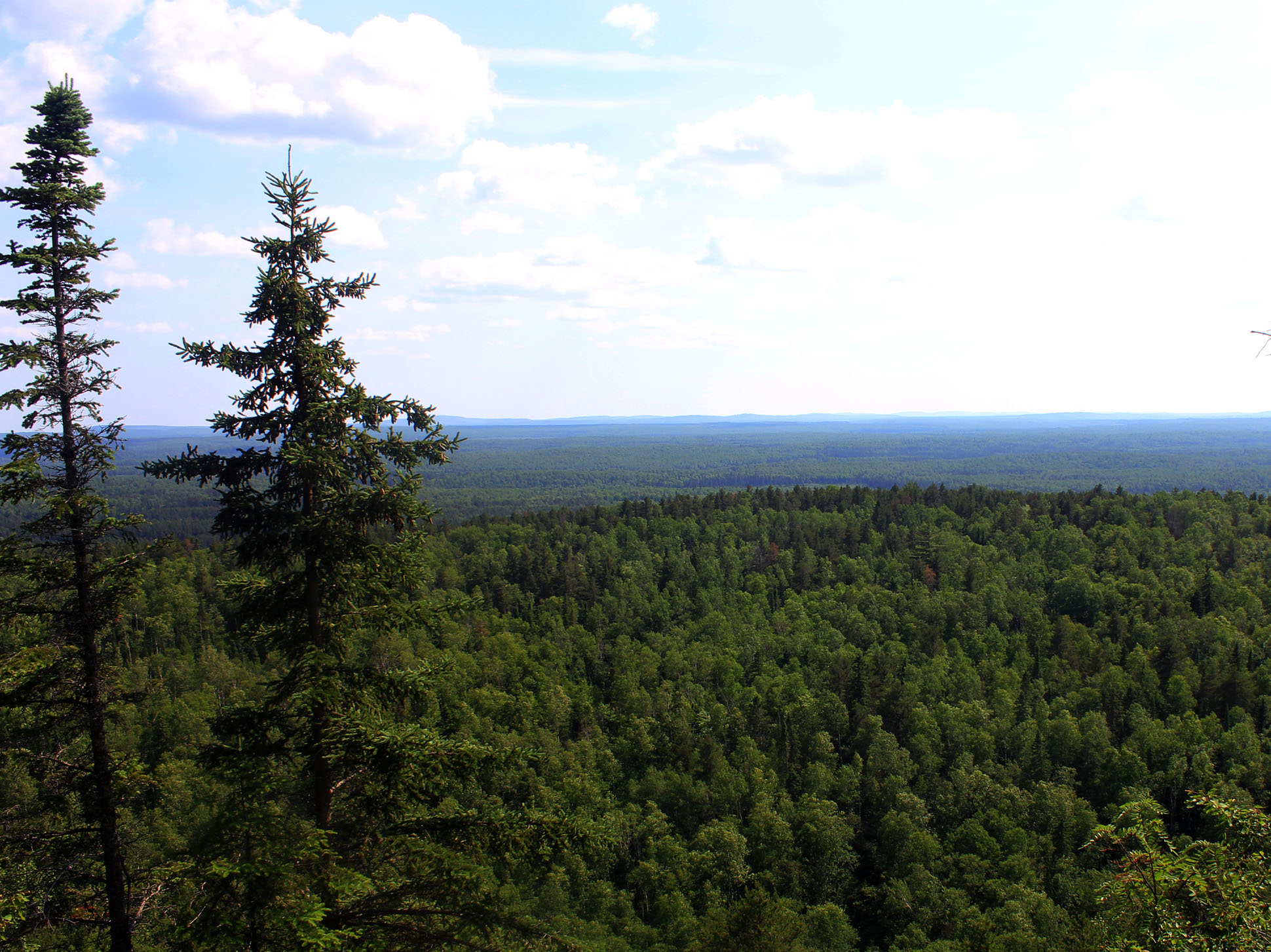

The Laurentian Mixed Forest Province, also known as the Northwoods, is a forested ecoregion in eastern Upper Midwest North America in the United States and Canada. Similar, though not necessarily identical regions, are identified by the United States Environmental Protection Agency as Northern Lakes and Forests and by the World Wildlife Fund, regions such as the Western Great Lakes forests and Eastern forest-boreal transition.

== Geography ==
In the United States, the area consists of a broad region of northern Minnesota, Wisconsin and Michigan (Northern Michigan and the Upper Peninsula) and the forested areas of the North Country (New York) and New England. In Canada, it is found in Ontario around the Great Lakes and the Saint Lawrence River through Quebec to Quebec City.

Nearly all of the region was covered by glaciers during the last ice age, which created many lakes and wetlands throughout the region. The poor soils and cool climate in this region were not conducive to farming for early settlers, which resulted in the regrowth of most of the forest after being cleared during the 19th and early 20th centuries. With the abundant lakes and streams and regrowth of the forests, the region became a major tourist and recreation area for the larger population centers just to the south.

== Ecology ==
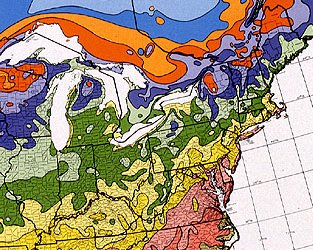
1990 USDA Hardiness zone map detail for the northeast US. Zone 3a is light orange, zone 4b is light lavender.

The area is a temperate broadleaf and mixed forests biome transition zone between the true boreal forest to the north and the Big Woods and Carolinian forest to the south, with characteristics of each. It has areas of both broadleaf and conifer forest cover, and bodies of water ranging from lakes to conifer bogs and swamps. Conifers include pines, spruces, firs, and junipers; deciduous types include aspens, paper birches, mountain ash and maples. It is often said to have a distinct smell, which is attributed partially to the presence of sweet fern and balsam poplar.

The climate roughly corresponds with USDA plant hardiness zones 3a through 4b, although in New England the region extends into zone 5a. The forest region is adapted to the Humid continental climate with warm, humid summers and cold, snowy winters. The Köppen climate classification is Dfb.

During the lumbering era, unrestricted logging and the resulting fires destroyed much of the forest. With the advent of fire suppression and forest management, the resulting second-growth forest differed substantially from the original forest cover. Conifer tree species became less common in the resulting forest. Early successional tree species such as aspen and birch became much more prevalent and replaced much of the mixed conifer and deciduous forests that originally existed prior to the logging era.

Major animal species inhabiting the forest include white-tailed deer, moose, porcupine, beaver, American red squirrel, eastern gray squirrel, chipmunk, opossum, raccoon, bobcat, Canada lynx, fisher, American marten, long-tailed weasel, ruffed grouse, spruce grouse, bald eagle, red-tailed hawk, osprey, common loon, mallard, Canada goose, wild turkey, sandhill crane, snowshoe hare, American black bear, coyote, and red fox.

After being nearly extirpated from the conterminous United States, gray wolves survived in the remote northeastern corner of Minnesota and Ontario. The repopulation of wolves in this region has occurred naturally as they have expanded their territory. Lone cougar have been documented moving through the region, but these appear to consist of solitary young males dispersing from the Great Plains, and little evidence of breeding populations is currently known to exist in the region. However, a female cougar and three kittens were spotted in northern Minnesota in April of 2026. This is the first evidence of cougar reproduction in the state in over 100 years. Elk have been reintroduced in northern Wisconsin, Michigan, and Ontario after having been extirpated prior to the 20th century by overhunting and habitat loss. The boreal woodland caribou used to inhabit the American portions of the region, but with the destruction of the original forest during the late 19th and early 20th centuries and the resulting expansion of the white-tailed deer population (which carry the deadly Parelaphostrongylus tenuis brain worm parasite), the species is confined to Canada.

=== Gallery of wildlife ===
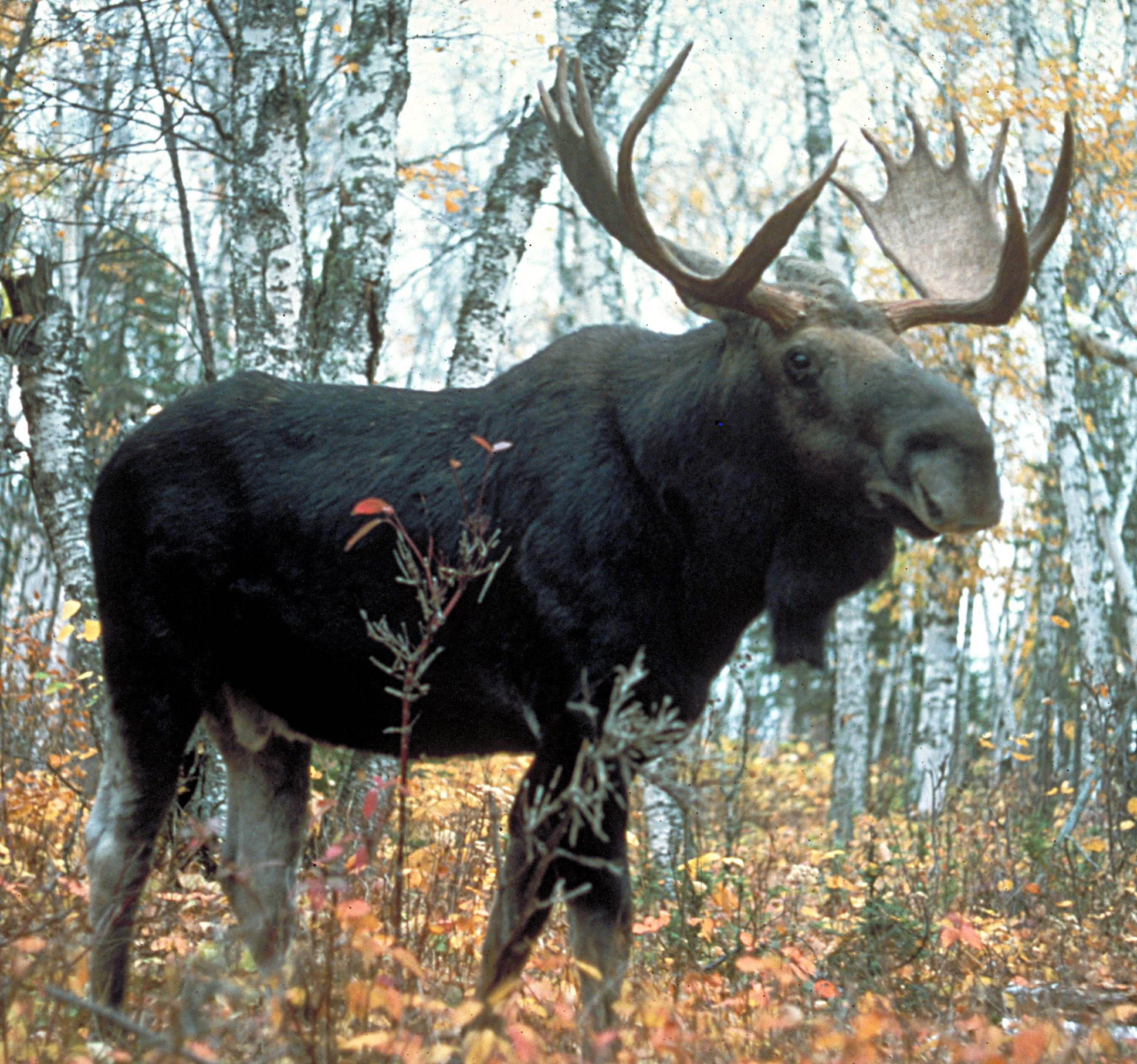

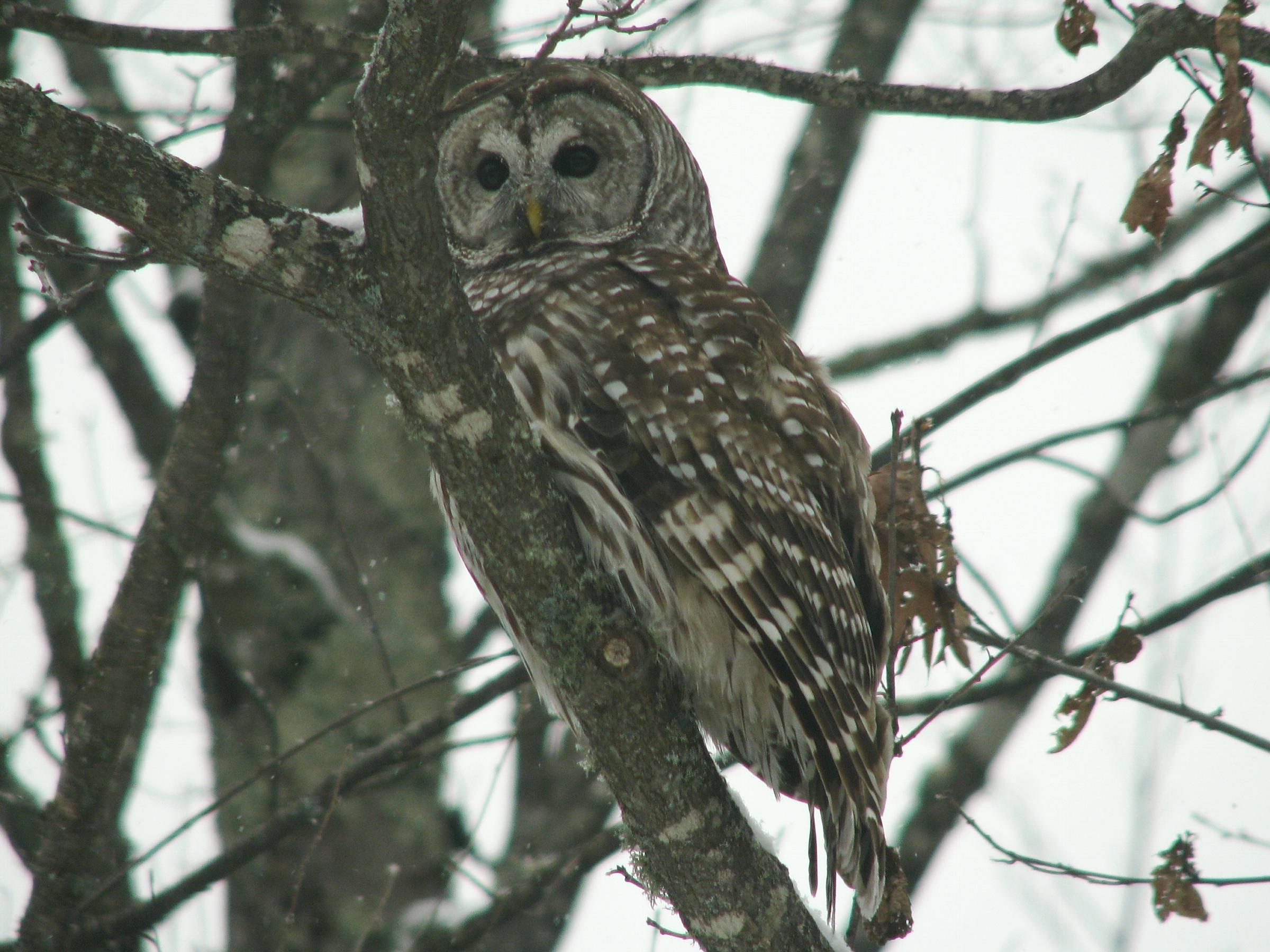

== See also ==
- North Country Trail
- Temperate broadleaf and mixed forests
