= Abraham Feinberg =

Rabbi, singer, peace activist (1899–1986)

- Born: September 14, 1899; Bellaire, Ohio, U.S.
- Died: October 5, 1986 (aged 87); Reno, Nevada, U.S.
- Other name: Anthony Frome
- Occupations: Rabbi and singer
- Years active: 1916–1986
- Known for: Social activism
- Notable work: Storm the Gates of Jericho (1964), Rabbi Feinberg's Hanoi Diary (1968), I Was So Much Older Then (1970), Sex and the Pulpit (1981)
- Spouses: Ruth E. Katsh (1930–1971), Patricia C. Blanchard (1983–1986)
- Children: 2

Abraham Feinberg (14 September 1899 – 5 October 1986) was an American rabbi who lived much of his life in Canada. In his obituary, The New York Times declared about him: "He was always ready to march, lend his name or send a telegram if there was a protest for disarmament or for a treaty on a nuclear test ban, or against racism in South Africa, radical injustice in America and United States policy in Vietnam."

== From rabbi to pop star ==
Feinberg was born in Bellaire, Ohio, to Yiddish-speaking Ashkenazi-Jewish parents, immigrants from Grinkishki (modern Grinkiškis, Lithuania) in the Russian empire. Feinberg always called Grinkishki "the birthplace of my spirit". His parents often spoke to him about the shetl that they had left behind, and Feinberg stated that he felt that Grinkishki was a part of him. His father, Nathan was a rabbi, while his mother, Sarah (née Abramson) was a housewife. Another source describes Nathan Feinberg as a cantor and umbrella repair man who left the Russian empire for the United States. In his memoirs, Feinberg stated his parents moved to the United States in 1882. Feinberg was the 7th of the 10 children in his family.

Bellaire was an impoverished coal-mining town located on the Ohio river across from Wheeling, West Virginia and Feinberg grew up in poverty. Feinberg found himself shocked by the mistreatment of the black residents of Bellaire when he was growing up. One day, he saw a young black boy known as Skeets being pelted with stones and garbage on the streets. When Skeets attempted to swim across the Ohio to escape his tormentors, he was hit on the head by a rock and drowned. Since Skeets was black, his death was written off by the authorities as of no importance. Feinberg's best friend as a child was Dude, the son of a black garbageman. His childhood experiences left him with a strong sympathy for Afro-Americans as fellow victims of prejudice, and throughout his life he was a champion of civil rights. An intellectual prodigy, Feinberg graduated from high school at the age of 14. After graduating, he went to work as a menial laborer while saving up enough money to attend university. Feinberg worked in a steel mill in Bellaire. Bellaire was a tough working class town where violence and heavy drinking were the norm, and Feinberg was hardened by his youth. Feinberg recalled about his youth: "Passion for the underdog still stirs me to indignation. I saw coal miners beaten on the streets because they demanded an union; I saw a black playmate drowned ... stunned by rock-throwing rednecks yelling 'nigger!'"

He was educated at the University of Cincinnati, where he earned a Bachelor of Arts degree in 1920. In 1924, he was ordained a rabbi at the Hebrew Union College in Cincinnati. Feinberg worked as a rabbi in a number of American cities between 1924 and 1930. Feinberg began his rabbinical career at Temple Beth-El in Niagara Falls, New York. In 1925, he moved to Wheeling to become the rabbi of Eoff Street Temple.

In 1928, Feinberg became the rabbi at a New York synagogue, the Temple Israel, attended by a wealthy congregation, and he often went to parties and dinners hosted by New York's Jewish elite on exclusive Park Avenue. Temple Israel was the second largest Reform synagogue in New York. By his own admission, he found himself bored by the superficiality of upper-class life in New York, and found himself yearning for something more in life than attending one party after another. In 1964, Feinberg recalled: "Full of youthful idealism, I found myself increasingly disillusioned with the role I was expected to play—more a promoter and social director of a complex organization than a pastor of human souls".

On 27 February 1930, he announced in a sermon his resignation as a rabbi, saying: "The preacher today has been forced to renounce his mission and become a salesman. He is made to fear a loss in membership more than the wrath of God. Instead of a poet, a dreamer, a transcendent mystic, he distorts himself into a seeker after popularity, a clerk of pew rentals, a good fellow. Just as other men sell clothes or automobiles or stocks, so does he dispense religion—for a price". In his sermon "Why I am Leaving the Professional Ministry", Feinberg stated "organized religion is a deserted lighthouse" that had left him spiritually numb.

His resignation from a prestigious synagogue attended by some of the richest Jews in New York attracted much publicity at the time. In Moscow, Pravda put his resignation on the front page, portraying Feinberg's resignation as due to the soullessness of American capitalism in New York, though Feinberg insisted he was only rejecting organized religion, not Judaism as a faith. Joseph L. Lewis, president of the Freethinkers of America, invited Feinberg to join him on a "crusade for truth" against all religion, an offer he declined. Heywood Broun praised Feinberg's resignation as an act of principle. Two columns of newsprint in The New York Times were devoted to discussing Feinberg's resignation. Rabbi Jacob Kohn of New York's Temple Ansche Chesed called Feinberg a "young and immature, disillusioned idealist". Rabbi Kohn went on to say: "Rabbi Feinberg is an idealist, and his remarks were those of an idealist, and when he refers to commercialism in organized religion, his remarks are the remarks of the disillusioned idealist. He was premature. He should have remembered that it is not fair to condemn the religious institution as a whole because some human errors had upset his inspiration. It would be just as unfair to condemn the entire judicial system of a nation because one magistrate had yielded to corruption."

Feinberg then went to France, where he studied singing at the American Conservatory at Fontainebleau for a few months. Upon his return to New York, he announced his intention to have a career in show business. On November 4, 1930, he married Ruth E. Katsh in New York. Feinberg sang under the Gentile-sounding stage name Anthony Frome. From 1932 to 1935, he hosted a popular radio music show in New York City, where he was known as the "Poet Prince of the Air Waves". Feinberg's radio career began at WMCA radio station, but he was soon promoted up to WOR, a station with a more powerful radio broadcaster that covered much of the northeast of the United States. By 1932, Feinberg was being paid $1, 500 dollars per week, a substantial sum in the Great Depression.

Feinberg believed that much of the success of his radio show was due to the fact that starting in 1933 it always aired right after President Franklin D. Roosevelt gave his weekly "fireside chats" on the radio. His persona was that of a "vagabond prince" who would "visit" a different country every radio show and sing love songs in whatever language of the nation he was pretending to visit (Feinberg was fluent in six languages). Feinberg was described as having a "melodious baritone" voice. Feinberg's mother disapproved of his change of career, telling her son on her deathbed in Yiddish: "Abelch, mein zoon, a rov, a rov! Yetzt gevoren a zinger, a gornit!" ("Abe, my son, a rabbi, a rabbi! Now's he become a singer, a nothing!").

Feinberg as Frome was photographed dressed in an expensive smoking robe and slippers in what the newspapers called "his 40-foot living room, lined with portraits in oil and precious first editions", giving the impression of a man who lived a life of decadence and luxury. In his 1964 memoir Storm the Gates of Jericho, Feinberg recalled that his image was remade as follows:

"One NBC publicity luminary disagreed with the 'singing rabbi' approach. 'What female in Omaha or Patchogue would weave her fantasy sex-fulfillment around a rabbi?' he demanded. 'They think of a rabbi as an old man with a long beard!' So this unromantic image must be countered by letting the fans see what I looked like. Soon a photograph streamed from the publicity mill—wavy-haired, broodingly dark but serenely poetic, in dressing gown, smoking a pipe and reading in the library of his palatial apartment."

Newspapers stories in the 1930s portrayed him as an eccentric who never sang without the Rubaiyat of Omar Khayyám in his pocket, that he spent vast sums of money on buying clothing, that he was planning to build a castle in the Berkshires, and that he had an obsession with barrel organs. A handsome man, Feinberg appeared on the cover of Radio Guide and was labelled "a romantic idealist" who was looking the world over for the right girl to marry. The fact that Feinberg was already married was kept a secret to make him more appealing to his female fans. A fan club consisting mostly of young women known as the "court of the poet prince" emerged, and Feinberg sang at New York's Fox and Paramount Theaters. He noted with amusement that his fans, unaware that he was Jewish, always sent him Christmas cards. Feinberg recalled about his singing career:

"My repertoire ran the gamut from the products of flash-in-the-pan tunesters who were pounding out romance for Bing Crosby and Rudy Vallee, to Victor Herbert and Stephen Foster: from Richard Rodgers, Jerome Kern, Cole Porter and Noël Coward to Schubert, Puccini and Verdi: from Valentina, Siboney, La Cucaracha and The Night Was Made for Love to The Rosary and Kol Nidrei, from tender lullabies to sombre lyrics of passion in every tongue. But always it must be "from person to person, from heart to heart.” I faced the cold metallic microphone and tried to concentrate on somebody I loved — Mom or Ruth, depending on the type of love I was trying to project".

== Tikkun olam: the activist rabbi ==
By 1935, he was sufficiently troubled by Nazi Germany to end his career as a singer and returned to working as a rabbi. Feinberg later stated that in view of what was happening in Germany that he could not be a singer and had to return to the service of God. Feinberg stated in 1950 about his return to religion: "I began thinking about what was going to happen to the Jews and I knew that there was only one thing for me to do—I had to go back to the rabbinate. That was, and is, where I belong. Singing is only amusement. My soul is in the pulpit and in the study." In 1935, he became the rabbi of Mount Neboh Temple, a small synagogue located in a poor neighborhood of New York. Mount Nehob was so poor the synagogue had been lacking a rabbi for some time as most rabbis did not wish to accept the low salary the synagogue offered, but Feinberg accepted the position as he wanted to be close to the poor. Feinberg's principal worry was the Third Reich, and from 1935 onward, he sought to build alliances outside of the Jewish community to rally a front against the Nazi regime. In 1938, he moved to Denver, Colorado to become the rabbi of Temple Emanuel. In 1942, Feinberg attempted to volunteer as a chaplain with the U.S. Army, but was turned down on the account of a medical disability."

In 1943, he accepted an offer to become the rabbi at Holy Blossom Temple in Toronto, the most prestigious Reform synagogue in Canada. Feinberg arrived in Toronto in November 1943. By that time, the 1st Canadian Corps was fighting in Italy, and he later remembered that he arrived to find a nation that was engrossed in the war. Through the full dimensions of the "Final Solution to the Jewish Question" were not known in North America at the time, Feinberg knew enough about what was happening to the Jews of Europe. He was an enthusiastic supporter of the war, urging Canadians to never slacken in the war against the 3rd Reich, and urged able-bodied Jewish men to enlist in the military as "active" members.

An extremely charismatic man and an excellent speaker, Feinberg soon became the best known rabbi in Canada, who hosted a weekly radio show where he spoke about various political and social issues. Feinberg often wrote about social issues in publications such as the Globe and Mail, Saturday Night, Maclean's, and the Toronto Star. Despite living much of his life in Canada and being very involved in Canadian issues, Feinberg always remained an American citizen. A great believer in the prophetic values of Reform Judaism, Feinberg took the notion of tikkun olam ("repairing the world") as requiring him to speak out against all forms of prejudice. Feinberg condemned not only antisemitism in Canada, but also criticized the Liberal Prime Minister, William Lyon Mackenzie King, for interning the entire Japanese-Canadian population in 1942. The internment of the Japanese-Canadians greatly offended Feinberg's sense of justice and in one of very first sermons at Holy Blossom he excoriated Mackenzie King for locking up an ethnic group without even trials on the mere suspicion of treason. Mackenzie King had interned the Japanese-Canadians despite being told by the Royal Canadian Mounted Police (RCMP) that the majority were loyal to Canada largely because of a massive racist hysteria which led him to fear his Liberal Party would lose the next election if he did not intern. As the internment of the Japanese-Canadians was very popular at the time, Feinbrg's sermons criticizing the internment caused much controversy, making the beginning of his rise to become Canada's most famous rabbi.

He was the chairman the Joint Public Relations Committee of the Canadian Jewish Congress and B'nai B'rith, who pressed the committee to lobby Ontario to end mandatory Christian prayers and the singing of Christmas carols in Ontario's public schools. During his time as chairman, which lasted until 1950, Feinberg pressed the Joint Public Relations Committee to take a more confrontational approach and to take up the cause of other groups such as Asian-Canadians and black Canadians. The Canadian historian Gerald Tulchinsky wrote that Feinberg had little interest in Jewish theology, but instead saw himself as a champion of all oppressed peoples, seeing himself as an advocate of a "Jewish social gospel" that required him to fight for justice and dignity for all. The Canadian press often called Feinberg the "red rabbi".

In Easter 1944, Feinberg gave a speech in Toronto saying:

"A surprising large number of scholars regards the stigma on Jews as the alleged murderers of Christ to be the underlying cause of anti-Semitism. Taught in Sunday Schools, it becomes an integral part of the sub-conscious mental inheritance and intrudes on every judgement...In recognition of this danger, as an obligation to truth and because of the need to establish a common groundwork for mutual fellowship in youth first of all, a group of 155 Protestant ministers in the United States last year agreed to revise the text-books now used in Christian Sunday Schools, in order to expunge hatred-inciting, unauthentic and prejudiced accounts of the Jewish roles in the crucifixion. A commission to change these books is now in order. God prosper its labors!".

Feinberg further wrote "the documentary basis for the charge that Jews caused the death of Jesus can be only found in one of the four Gospels ... the Gospel of St. John, which students universally consider the least reliable and the one written after the longest interval". Feinberg's speech caused much controversy with the Social Credit MP Norman Jaques distorting his speech to claim that Feinberg had called the New Testament a fraud. Jaques claimed: "So the Christian Gospels now are labelled 'unreliable' and 'unauthentic'-untrue, while St. John is named as anti-semite". Jaques claimed that" "our remains a Christian nation, guided and inspired by Christian ideals" while also saying that nearly the entire Jewish community were members of the Canadian Communist Party. Thus in this way, Jaques claimed that Jews raise the "bogey of anti-semitism" as a "Communist smokescreen".

In 1944, the Conservative government of Premier George A. Drew announced as of September of that year, "instruction in the tenets of the Christian faith" would be mandatory in all Ontario's public schools. Feinberg led the opposition to Drew's changes in education, saying it was "undemocratic, imperiling the separation of Church and State, and leading to disunity in society". However, when Claris Silcox of the United Church of Canada who supported Drew challenged Feinberg to a debate on the subject, he declined under grounds that the subject was "too hot", a tacit admission that public opinion in Ontario was solidly behind the government. In his first summer in Canada, Feinberg and his wife attempted to rent a cottage in the Ontario countryside, only to be repeatedly told by the owners of the cottages that they did not rent to Jews or alternatively it was not legally possible to rent to them because local by-laws forbade renting residential property to Jews. In 1944, Feinberg joined the advisory board of the Toronto Progressive Labour Party, which was a front for the Canadian Communist Party, causing the RCMP to begin monitoring him as a possible Soviet spy. In 1945 Feinberg attended a fundraising dinner for the United Jewish People's Order, a left-wing group linked to the Canadian Communist Party, which led to further suspicions by the RCMP that Feinberg was at very least a Communist.

In 1945, Feinberg wrote an article in Maclean's charging that there was rampant antisemitism in Canada, writing:

"Jews are kept out of most ski clubs. Sundry summer colonies (even on municipally owned land), fraternities, and at least one Rotary Club operate under written or unwritten “Gentiles Only” signs. Many bank positions are not open to Jews. Only three Jewish male physicians have been admitted to non-Jewish Hospital staffs in Toronto. McGill University has instituted a rule requiring in effect at least a 10% higher academic average for Jewish applicants; in certain schools of the University of Toronto anti-Jewish bias is being felt. City Councils debate whether Jewish petitioners should be permitted to build a synagogue; property deeds in some areas bar resale to them. I have seen crude handbills circulated thanking Hitler for his massacre of 80,000 Jews in Kiev."

In 1945, he was the inspiration behind a legal challenge to the "restrictive covenants" that forbade the selling or renting of property to Jews by supporting the Re Drummond Wren case. In a calculated risk, a Jewish group, the Workers' Education Association (WEA) had purchased a property in Toronto known to have a "restrictive covenant" in order to build a home for veterans of World War Two. Only after construction was well under way was it announced that the property had a "restrictive covenant" and was thus illegal as the WEA was a Jewish group. The historian Philip Giarad observed the Drummond Wren case appeared to have been a set-up as the WEA should have known the property had a "restrictive covenant", and the case appears to have been launched to take advantage of a moment when public opinion was much more sympathetic towards Jews. In April–May 1945, the last of the death camps and concentration camps of Nazi Germany had been liberated, and newsreel footage of emaciated Holocaust survivors had suddenly made antisemitism unfashionable. On 31 October 1945, Justice John Keiller MacKay ruled against the "restrictive covenant" laws as a violation of the law in the Drummond Wren case. In a pamphlet he printed praising MacKay's ruling, Feinberg wrote: "It clothes in concrete reality, for specific cases, the universally acclaimed principles for which World World Two was pursued to a victorious end".

In February 1947, Feinberg was part of a Canadian Jewish Congress (CJC) delegation who met Social Credit Party leaders in Ottawa to ask them to purge their party of its vocal anti-Semitic wing. In the aftermath of the Holocaust, there was a "Never Again!" attitude in the Canadian Jewish community and there was a feeling that antisemitism must not be tolerated in any form. At the meeting in Ottawa, the CJC delegation complained that the Social Credit French language newspaper Vers Demain had been printing extracts from The Protocols of the Learned Elders of Zion and in general the newspaper was very hostile towards Jews. The meeting did not yield positive results. Feinberg attended later in 1947 a meeting of the CJC leaders that concluded that the Social Credit movement, whose support was mostly found in western Canada and in Quebec, was the most dangerous anti-Semitic movement in Canada, and the CJC should do everything within its power to discredit Social Credit. At the same summit of the CJC leaders, Feinberg argued that all racism must be fought, not just antisemitism, saying: "The French-speaking Catholic in Ontario, the Japanese deportee from British Columbia, the Negro economic pariah are no less a Jewish obligation than we are a moral crisis for the Christian". At a meeting in late 1947, Charles Daley, the Ontario minister of labour dismissively told Feinberg "that these days, racial discrimination is to a great extent imaginary".

A supporter of Zionism, when on 6 December 1947, the United Nations declared that the Palestine Mandate would be partitioned into an Arab state and a Jewish state, Feinberg put on a pageant at Holy Blossom starring the children of his congregation in celebration. The pageant portrayed "2, 000 years of pogroms, antisemitism and travails", ending in with Israel being declared. Concerned that the Jews might be accused of having dual loyalties, at the same time Feinberg told the Globe & Mail: "Palestine has always been the center of our pristine Jewish culture and faith and the shrine of our sacred memory. Canada, however, remains the soil on which young Canadian Jewry has been born".

In 1948, Feinberg attended a conference of the World Jewish Congress in Paris, where he criticized Canadian immigration law for excluding Jewish nurses and domestic workers from coming to Canada. His criticism of Canadian immigration law with the implication that the government of Canada was anti-semitic caused much controversy. Most of all, Feinberg championed the cause of Canadian blacks, lobbying successive premiers of Ontario to end prejudices against blacks in employment and housing. Feinberg became the vice president of the Toronto Association for Civil Rights. Feinberg's social activism made him not only the famous rabbi in Toronto, but also one of the most famous rabbis in the world.

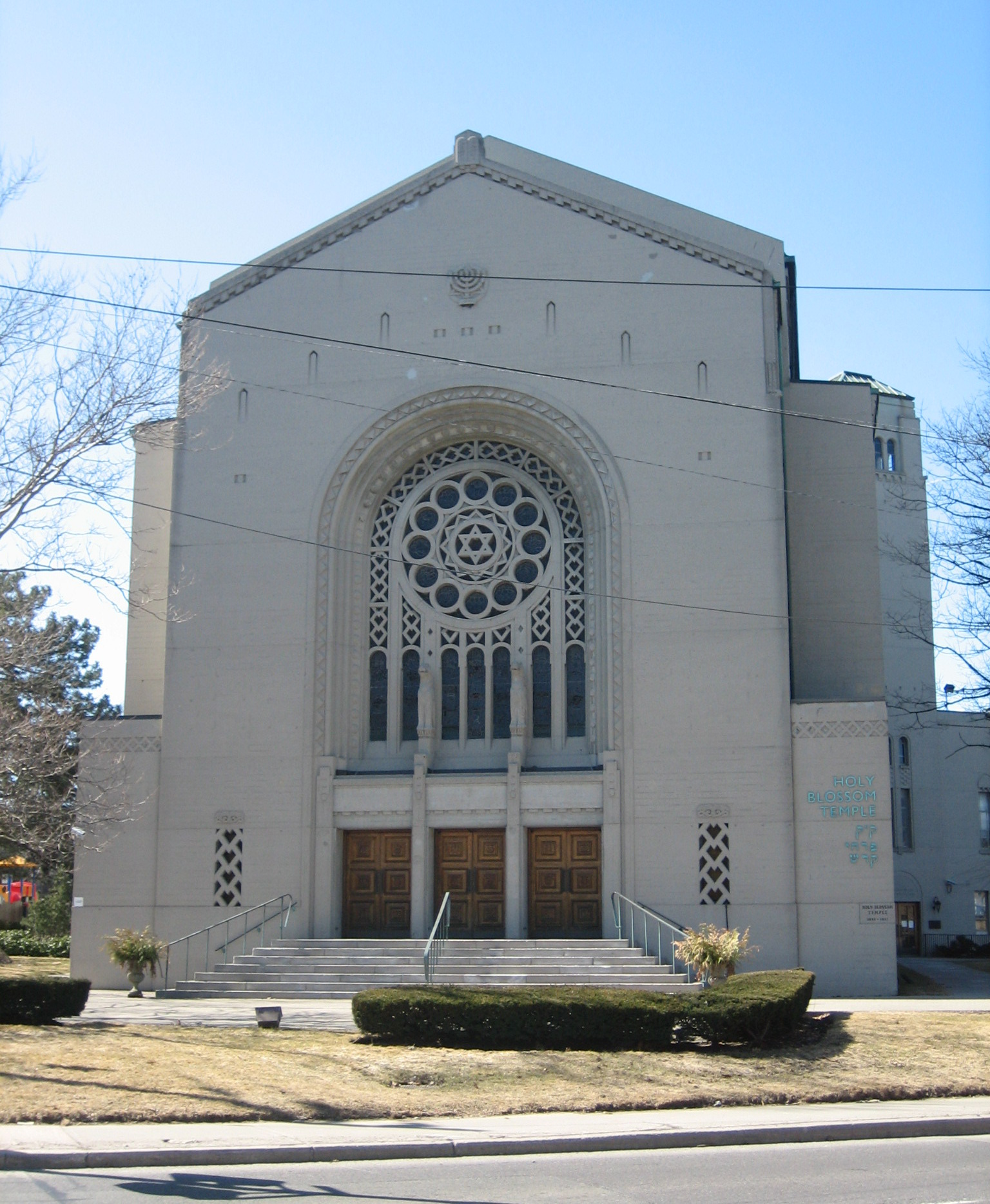
Holy Blossom Temple in Toronto. Feinberg served as the rabbi of Holy Blossom from 1943 to 1961

In 1948, MacKay's ruling in the Drummond Wren case was struck down in the Noble v Alley case by the Ontario Superior Court of Appeal, which ruled that "restrictive covenants" were "legal and enforceable". The Noble case had been started when a woman named Anna Noble tried to sell her cottage at the Beach O' Pines resort to a Jewish businessman, Bernard Wolf, only to be blocked by the Beach O'Pines Resort Association which had a "restrictive covenant" forbidding the sale of cottages to any person of "Jewish, Hebrew, Semitic, Negro or colored race or blood." At the time, a heartbroken Feinberg told the media that the ruling in the Noble case was "a blow to the prestige and mature development of Canada". However, with the support of the Joint Committee, the Noble ruling was appealed to the Supreme Court of Canada, which struck down "restrictive covenants" in November 1950.

In 1949, Feinberg met Leslie Frost, the Conservative Premier of Ontario, to press him for pass laws ending discrimination against minorities, saying: "It is a sham to attempt to defend Western democracy against Communism if a man or a woman is prevented from getting a job because of discrimination against race, religion or color." Such lobbying had its effect, and Frost's government passed several acts such as Fair Employment Act of 1951 and the Fair Accommodations Acts of 1954 making it illegal to discriminate on racial or religious grounds. Even before the Supreme Court had struck down "restrictive covenants" for all of Canada, the Frost government had passed a law forbidding "restrictive covenants".

In 1950, Dorothy Sangster wrote in Macleans' about him: "Today American-born Rabbi Feinberg is one of the most controversial figures to occupy a Canadian pulpit. Gentiles recognize him as the official voice of Canadian Jewry. This fact was aptly demonstrated a few years ago when Montreal's Mayor Houde introduced him to friends as Le Cardinal des Juifs—the Cardinal of the Jews". As part of his social activism, Feinberg allowed a Chinese-Canadian, a Japanese-Canadian, an Indian Hindu man, and a black man named William Carter to speak before Holy Blossom about their experiences of discrimination in Canada. The town of Dresden, Ontario was notorious as being the most segregated town in Canada, and Feinberg was active in campaigning to end the discrimination suffered by the black residents of Dresden. Carter was from Dresden, and Feinberg usually stayed with his family when he was in Dresden. Working closely with the Negro Citizenship Association, Feinberg's Joint Labor Committee led demonstrations against businesses that refused to hire blacks or admit black customers.

In December 1950, Feinberg set off a notable row in Toronto when he delivered a sermon denouncing as an injustice that Jewish children in public schools were being forced to sing Christmas carols. Three Orthodox rabbis in a public letter denounced Feinberg's sermon, saying that Canada was a "Christian country" and Jews should respect the wishes of the majority least it give rise to antisemitism. Various Christian clergymen then started to denounce Feinberg's sermon, which was widely misrepresented as calling for an end to Christmas and the singing of all Christmas carols. The Globe and Mail in an editorial on 5 December 1950 entitled "A Deplorable Proposal" condemned Feinberg, asking how it was possible for a rabbi to want "to eliminate Christmas from public schools". Feinberg's attempts to argue that he had not called for ending Christmas, just merely having Jewish children being forced to sing Christmas carols, were completely ineffective. With public opinion firmly against him as the man who allegedly wanted to end Christmas, Feinberg abandoned his efforts. In a poll in 1951 taken by Saturday Night magazine, Feinberg was named of one Canada's 7 Greatest Preachers.

In 1955–56, Feinberg supported the effort to ban the 1899 book Little Black Sambo from Toronto's public schools following the complaint of a black man, Daniel “Danny” Braithwaite, that watching a cartoon version of Little Black Sambo had traumatised his six-year-old son. In a sermon, Feinberg stated: "Little Black Sambo in the public schools encouraged race prejudice by creating a pattern of Negro minstrel show comicality in the minds of white children, and by arousing a sense of persecution and emotional insecurity in colored children. Neither potential arrogance nor an inferiority complex is a proper seed-bed for Canadian citizenship."

Feinberg continued to be a supporter of Zionism, and engaged in debates with the United Church of Canada over the issue. After the Observer, the journal of the United Church, had published a pro-Palestinian article by Claris Silcox saying the establishment of Israel in 1948 had been an outrage, Feinberg asked for and was allowed to publish a rebuttal article in the next edition of the Observer. In his article, Feinberg wrote the "recreation of a sovereign secure homeland in Palestine for the Jews...has been since the dispersion an inextricable part of a sacred Messianic hope at the core of Judaism". Feinberg observed that it was President Gamal Abdel Nasser of Egypt who was threatening in his speeches to wipe Israel off the face of the world while the Israeli Prime Minister David Ben-Gurion was making no such threats about Egypt. Feinberg accused Nasser of having "Hitler-like dreams" about Jews. He wrote that he felt sad about the suffering of the Palestinian refugees, but he also stated that there were hundreds of thousands of Jewish refugees who were expelled or fled from Arab nations such as Egypt, Iraq, and Yemen living in Israel, which did not excite the passion of the Observer in same way that Palestinian refugees did. Feinberg concluded the best solution to the Israeli–Palestinian dispute would be an inter-faith dialogue about the status of the Holy Land between Christian, Jewish and Muslim religious leaders.

In 1957, Feinberg became the first rabbi to receive an honorary degree from the University of Toronto. Feinberg also protested against the nuclear arms race of the Cold War, and became president of the Toronto Committee for Disarmament. A colorful character, Feinberg's liberal views on social issues such as legalizing abortion and a frank acceptance of human sexuality as normal made him very controversial. His activism led the Canadian government to regard him as a trouble-maker and during his time as rabbi of Holy Blossom from 1943 to 1961, he was spied upon by the Royal Canadian Mounted Police (RCMP) as a "subversive".

== The Singing Rabbi ==
In 1961, Feinberg retired and was granted the title of rabbi emeritus. Feinberg's retirement was caused by an eye ailment. After his retirement, he became involved in the civil rights movement and in protesting against the Vietnam war. Feinberg continued criticize Canadian immigration laws. Feinberg noted Canada welcomed all Hungarian refugees because they were white and anti-communist, despite the fact that many of them had health problems, while turning away healthy immigrants from the West Indies, despite that fact the former British colonies in the Caribbean were members of the Commonwealth "family".

In July 1964, when the Lions Club of Toronto invited the white supremacist governor of Alabama, George Wallace, to give a lecture on race relations, Feinberg was the principle organizer of the protests against Wallace coming to Toronto. Feinberg asked to meet the Lions Club's leaders to press them to reconsider, but was refused. In a public letter to the Lions Club, Feinberg asked for the club to "stand up and be counted at this crossroads in the history of man" by withdrawing the invitation. The invitation was not withdrawn, and on 8 July 1964 Wallace spoke to the Lions Club of Toronto, arguing that segregation in Alabama was good for both blacks and whites. The same day, Feinberg was a lead speaker at a protest rally outside the Lions Club, saying "Governor Wallace has carved a political career out of contempt for human beings, and we owe more courtesy to the Negro members of our community than we owe a second-hand guest".

In September 1964, Maclean's published an article by Feinberg urging inter-racial marriage as the solution to race conflict, writing: "We support the civil rights movement in the U. S.; we insist that the color of a man's skin shouldn't deprive him of the right to a cup of coffee or a seat in a theatre; some enthusiasts even picket southern segregationists when they visit Canada, and most Canadians, I think, support the sentiments of such demonstrators. Yet for all our protestations to the contrary, we seldom act as though all races were equal. Most Canadians who talk equality have seldom been on close terms with a Negro. ... And many of the most enlightened of us would, in all honesty, have to answer 'no' when confronted with the old question that segregationists always use to clinch an argument: 'Would you want your sister to marry one?' This 'no,' this refusal to sanction the mixing of the races, is the final bastion of race hostility. Until we learn to fight our ingrown fears of sexual relations between the races, the end of the race problem will not be in sight." Feinberg argued that the government of Canada should "encourage" inter-racial marriage and relationships as the best way to end all racism in Canada.

Feinberg argued against the theory of innate racial characteristics, stating: "I can't accept this notion, because the astonishing ability of human groups to change their "innate" characteristics has been demonstrated time and time again. It was the Russians, forty years ago a nation of illiterate peasants, who launched the first astronauts [cosmonauts]; the "heathen Chinese" will soon develop their own atomic bomb. Even the warlike Fiji Islanders, who barbecued their last missionary eight decades ago, are now, according to Saturday Review editor Norman Cousins, the most warmhearted, generous and trusting of human tribes". Feinberg argued that through people of different races look different, but there was no evidence that any race was inferior, arguing that low results on aptitude tests achieved by blacks and First Nations peoples were due to an "environment" that discouraged intellectual achievement, instead of being hereditary. Feinberg wrote: "In some Southern states, however, and in South Africa, sexual relations between persons of different races are proscribed by law; to me, this fact underlines the close connection between the fear of mixed marriages and the humiliation of full-scale segregation. As a Jew, I believe that, such proscriptions are every bit as shameful as Hitler’s Nuremberg laws, which forbade physical love between Aryans and Jews". Feinberg argued that as long as people refused to marry people of different races, racism would persist.

Feinberg condemned the Vietnam War as "immoral", saying that in all good conscience he must speak out against the war. Feinberg's anti-war activism led to his speeches being heckled; receiving death threats on his phone and in the mail; and for a popular pamphlet, The Red Rabbi, accusing him of being a Communist being published. In January 1967, he visited Hanoi to meet Ho Chi Minh as part of a peace mission to protest the Vietnam war. Ho disliked meeting Westerners and it was most unusual that Feinberg was allowed to meet him. Feinberg called Ho this "paragon of durability impervious to events", who spoke to him in French and told him he was convinced that North Vietnam would win. Feinberg spent 10 days in Hanoi with a Presbyterian minister, the Reverend A. J. Muste, and the South African Anglican bishop, Ambrose Reeves. In a joint statement, the three clergymen condemned Operation Rolling Thunder, the American strategic bombing campaign against North Vietnam as both ineffective and a war crime. The statement claimed that the North Vietnamese people "could not be terrorized" into submission and predicted that Rolling Thunder was destined to fail. The statement accused President Lyndon Johnson of violating both the United Nations charter and the Geneva Accords.

On his way back to Toronto, Feinberg stopped in London to give a press conference, where he stated that Ho had told him that he was willing to meet Johnson in Hanoi to discuss peace "but without a gun at his hip". The latter was a reference to Ho's demand that the United States unconditionally stop the bombing of North Vietnam before peace could be discussed. The press conference in London with the dramatic offer of a summit between Ho and Johnson attracted much media attention, making the cover of The New York Times. His trip to North Vietnam was recounted in his 1968 book Rabbi Feinberg's Hanoi Diary. In his Hanoi Diary, Feinberg denounced the "court Jews" who counselled President Johnson along hawkish lines such as his namesake Abraham Feinberg (no relation), Walt Whitman Rostow and Abraham Fortas as distorting Judaism.

On 26 January 1967, Feinberg met in New York with Arthur Goldberg, the American ambassador to the United Nations, to ask if it was possible to set up a Ho-Johnson summit. Goldberg told the amateur diplomat Feinberg that it was a serious violation of diplomatic protocol for him to announce the offer of a summit in London without informing Johnson first, saying the president was very angry at him. Feinberg dictated Ho's offer to Goldberg's secretary, who typed it down along with a profuse apology for having broken diplomatic protocol. Goldberg who was scheduled to meet Johnson the next day promised Feinberg he would take along the offer with him for the president to consider. However, Johnson was not prepared to end the bombing of North Vietnam, and without that precondition being met first, the prospect of a Ho-Johnson summit ended. By 1967, Feinberg had emerged as the chairman of Vietnam Coordinating Committee in Toronto that organized protests against the war and pressed the Canadian government to grant asylum to American draft-dodgers who had fled to Canada.

In 1967, an article by Feinberg recounting his recent visit to Moscow in October 1966 was published in the Globe & Mail, which was entered into Congressional Record by the Republican Senator Jacob Javits, as illustrating the current state of Soviet Jewry. Feinberg praised the Soviet Union as an improvement over Imperial Russia, saying the "evil stench of the czars" was gone, but he criticized the treatment of Soviet Jews as being very far from equal. Feinberg and his wife attended the Simchat Torah celebrations at Moscow's only synagogue, which he described as being attended by 15, 000 Soviet Jews singing joyously in Hebrew and Yiddish in the streets. Feinberg reported almost all of the older male Jews were World War Two veterans who proudly wore their Red Army medals and that many were horribly wounded, missing limbs such as their arms and/or legs.

He further reported that all of the Muscovite Jews he talked to expressed their gratitude to the Red Army for defeating Nazi Germany, observing that if the Wehrmacht had taken Moscow in 1941, then the Jews of Moscow would have been exterminated just like the Jews of Kiev, Smolensk, Odessa, Kishinev, Sevastopol, Minsk and so many other Soviet cities taken by the Germans had been exterminated. Feinberg wrote the "heroic" Red Army soldiers who defeated Nazi Germany had saved the entire Soviet Jewish community from being exterminated during the Holocaust, making him grateful for the sacrifices of the ordinary soldiers of the Red Army, who fought so hard and suffered so much. But at the same time, Feinberg criticized Joseph Stalin for having "murdered, among others, thousands of alien, cosmopolitan, intellectual Jews" after 1945. Feinberg wrote that many of the older Muscovite Jews told him that they still had nightmares of the postwar anti-Semitic purges.

He noted that the assimilation policies of the Soviet regime was having its effects with the younger Soviet Jews speaking Russian instead of Yiddish, and the distinctive culture of the Ashkenazim was being subsumed into Russian culture. Feinberg quoted the statistic that 70% of Soviet Jews gave their first language as Yiddish in the 1926 census, but only 18% did so in the 1959 census. Feinberg, who was fluent in Yiddish, but did not speak Russian, reported he had to use translators to speak to the younger Soviet Jews. Feinberg wrote that he had an "affectionate admiration for the Russian people", which made the barely veiled anti-Semitic remarks he heard from Soviet officials even more painful. Feinberg accused the Soviet regime of seeking to "obliterate every trance of a Jewish identity", and reported that almost all of the Jews he spoke to were living through lives of "tensions, deprivation and confusion". Feinberg called Birobidzhan, the Soviet Jewish "homeland" located in the desolate countryside along the banks of the Amur river that formed the border with China as being a sort of cruel joke.

Feinberg wrote that "governmental indifference and intimidation" was bearing down hard on Soviet Jews. Feinberg wrote that it not been possible to publish the Tanakh in the Soviet Union since 1926 and the "entire network of Jewish cultural institutions, which existed before the war, is gone; the extensive Yiddish publishing structure is shattered, the once world-renowned Moscow Jewish Theater is a ghostly memory. The Jewish cultural scene is a wasteland wherein comic relief was provided by a troupe of travelling singers and a tri-weekly newspaper in Birobidjan with a 1, 000 circulation". Feinberg criticized the Cold War, writing that tensions with the Western powers, especially the support for West German rearmament given by the United States, hindered the case for liberalization in the Soviet Union. Feinberg wrote that a nuclear war between the United States vs. the Soviet Union or between China vs. the Soviet Union would be a disaster for humanity and world leaders needed to do more to reduce Cold War tensions. Finally, Feinberg called upon the Soviet Union to allow unrestricted Jewish emigration to Israel, saying that those Jews who wanted to make the Aliyah should be allowed to do so.

After the Six Day War of 1967, a United Church leader, the Reverend Ernest Marshall Howse, published an article "Who Should Control Jerusalem?" arguing that the Israel had no claim to any of Jerusalem, a city which he wrote which had been "guarded and protected" by Palestinians for 1, 300 years. Howse's claim that Jerusalem was not a sacred and holy city for Jews caused a strong response, and he had a public debate with Feinberg over the issue. Howse's thesis that the Talmud and all Zionist literature were a form of anti-Gentile "hate literature" caused Feinberg to say that according to Howse's logic, Jews "must remain rejected and wander like Cain". Against Howse's claims that rabbis should be imprisoned for preaching hatred of Gentiles under the grounds that anti-Gentilism was the core of Judaism led Feinberg to say that Howse's devotion to Christianity made him into a natural anti-semite. Besides for the status of Jerusalem, Howse and Feinberg clashed over the origins of the Holocaust. Howse stated that there was no connection between Christianity and the völkisch racism, portraying both Nazi Germany and the "Final Solution to the Jewish Question" as "freakish aberrations" of the West, contenting that Western Christian civilization was naturally against phenomena such as genocide. Contra Howse, Feinberg argued that völkisch racism owned much to Christian antisemitism.

In 1969, Feinberg went to Montreal to join John Lennon and Yoko Ono in their "Bed In For Peace". A singer, Feinberg joined Lennon and Ono in singing "Give Peace a Chance". Feinberg suggested some changes to the lyrics of "Give Peace a Chance," which were incorporated by Lennon. The Montreal Gazette in its edition of 30 May 1969 credited Feinberg with coining the title of the song. The "rabbi" mentioned in "Give Peace a Peace" is Feinberg.

At the time, Feinberg told The Montreal Gazette that he had gone to join the "Bed-In" out of admiration for Lennon, saying "he is one of the most powerful influences in the modern world, and I feel he is doing a phenomenal thing for peace." Feinberg was described having bonded with Lennon, forming an instant friendship. In 1967, Ho had given Feinberg a walking cane with an Asian dragon craved as its head as a parting gift, which Feinberg almost gave to Lennon as a gift, but decided it would be insult to Ho to give away his Vietnamese cane. When Feinberg said he could barely keep time with modern music, Ono told him: "That doesn't matter. You're God's child, and any sound that comes out of you is beautiful." About the charge that it was undignified for a rabbi to associate with Lennon and Ono, Feinberg told The Montreal Gazette: "I'm not interested in what people say about dignity. I don't worship respectability. I feel you can sing for truth, justice and peace."

On 1 June 1969, in their room at the Queen Elizabeth Hotel, Lennon and Ono recorded the version of Give Peace A Chance alongside a chorus of their friends that was released to the public. Feinberg served as one of the backup singers making up the chorus in Give Peace A Chance together with Timothy Leary, Petula Clark, Allen Ginsberg, Tom Smothers, Kyoko Cox, Derek Taylor and many others. In August 1969, the version of Give Peace A Chance that was recorded in Montreal was released. In 1969, in Toronto, Feinberg and Lennon recorded a duet of Give A Peace A Chance, which was released as a single. Feinberg and Lennon worked together on several peace projects over the course of 1969. The success of his duet with Lennon inspired Feinberg to resume his singing career and he released more 10 songs over the last years of his life. At Lennon's encouragement, Feinberg recorded an album I Was So Much Older Then, which was recorded in 1969 and released in 1970. The songs on I Was So Much Older Then were mostly covers of songs by Neil Young, Leonard Cohen and Bob Dylan, which a reviewer on Billboard noted in 1970 gave one a clue to the kind of music that Feinberg was listening to.

In June 1969, Eldridge Cleaver of the Black Panthers visited Algeria and declared his support for Al Fath group of the Palestine Liberation Organization (PLO). In a letter to the editor of The Black Panther published on 9 August 1969, Feinberg identified himself as a "Jew", "Rabbi", and a "Panther supporter" who expressed his dismay at Cleaver's pro-Palestinian remarks. Feinberg asked for the Black Panthers to dissociate themselves with the PLO, which he described as a group committed ending to Israel via violence, and to driving the two million Jews of Israel out. No reply to Feinberg's letter was ever given, and The Black Panther continued to take a very anti-Israeli, pro-Palestinian line, depicting the PLO as a heroic freedom fighters engaged in the same struggle as the Panthers.

In December 1969, Feinberg spoke at a rally attended by American draft dodgers living in Toronto, where he praised them as American patriots, saying: "You should not feel that you are betraying America, you are saving it. I deny that I'm anti-American. I'm far more loyal to the United States than the silent majority" [supporting Richard Nixon, a reference to Nixon's "silent majority speech"]. On 11 March 1970, Feinberg was a lead speaker at a Toronto fundraiser hosted by Red, White and Black group that sought raise money for the defense lawyers of the Chicago 7. Red, White and Black was the support group for American draft-dodgers living in Canada that sought to help them integrate into Canadian society while protesting the war by holding anti-war rallies in front of the American consulate in Toronto. On 14 February 1971, Feinberg's wife died in Toronto of cancer.

== Return to America ==
In 1972, he returned to the United States to be close to his son Jonathan. Feinberg settled in Berkeley, California, and worked as the rabbi for the Glide Memorial Church in San Francisco which catered to "the outcasts of our social system". Feinberg became the "Rabbi-in-Residence" at the Glide Memorial Church, a Methodist church mostly attended by homosexuals and homeless people. As an old man, he was active in the "grey lib" movement, demanding better treatment of the old. In Berkeley, he hosted a radio show called Grey Lib, criticizing America's treatment of the elderly. In 1976 he settled in Reno, where his son Jonathan had gone to work as a doctor. In Reno, Feinberg worked as "Rabbi-in-Residence" at Temple Sinai. He also served as a rabbi at the Center for Religion and Life at the University of Nevada. From 1976 to 1978, he hosted another radio station in Reno called Grey Lib Plus.

His last book, Sex and the Pulpit, was a demand for Judaism to acknowledge more the healthiness of human sexuality as a source of happiness. Feinberg argued what he called "sex negationism" was a distortion of Judaism. Feinberg used books from the Tanakh such as highly erotic the Song of Songs and the Book of Proverbs with their remarks about how a husband should keep his wife happy to base his case against "sex negationism". Making a feminist argument, Feinberg argued that men in the ancient Middle East were afraid of female sexuality, and that many of the more patriarchal aspects of Judaism, Christianity, and Islam were based on an effort to control the sexuality of women. Feinberg argued that women have a greater desire for sex as the clitoris produces more sexual pleasure than the penis, causing sexual repression to emerge as a way to control women. He maintained that female genital mutilation, which involved cutting out the clitoris, was an especially brutal form of male control. He also noted that female genital mutilation is very common in the Near East. Feinberg wrote that for men the greatest fear when a woman gives birth is whatever the child is theirs or not, hence the fear that uncontrolled female sexuality would mean that they would never know if they really fathered the children that they believed to be theirs. Feinberg noted on his visits to Jerusalem that he saw in the Orthodox neighborhoods signs that denounced women who wore short skirts or uncovered their arms as "prostitutes". He also reported that he saw students from Orthodox yeshivot scream "prostitutes" at any Israeli women dressed in any manner that might in the slightest excite male sexual desire, which he used to argue that there was a strong fear of female sexuality in Orthodox Judaism.

He noted that many of the peoples the ancient Hebrews were in conflict with such as the Egyptians, the Phoenicians and the Greeks worshiped goddesses such as Isis, Ishtar, Diana, and Aphrodite, which increased the contrast between the patriarchal Yahweh vs. the goddesses of their enemies. He further noted that many of the goddess cults in the ancient Middle East such as the Great Mother of the Gods with her seven breasts openly displayed, had both priests and priestess who were equals. However, in the Great Mother of Gods cult, which originated in Phrygia and spread all over the Roman empire, the priests had to castrate themselves to honor the Great Mother and dress as women while the priestesses did not have to sexually mutilate themselves and did not have to wear male clothing. Feinberg argued that such cults increased the male fear of women in Judaism, observing the Prophets of the Tanakh denounced with great vehemence the licentious religion practiced by the peoples of Canaan and Phoenicia. He also argued that Judaism had more respect for women, observing the cult of Ishtar required all women to serve as sacred prostitutes in her temples at least once a year while the worship of Moloch required human sacrifice by burning children alive.

Feinberg also argued against what he called "penis imperialism", and for women to have control of their own sexuality. In the same book, Feinberg had an entire chapter entitled "Salute to a Gay Friend" arguing for the tolerance and acceptance of homosexuality as normal. Feinberg also argued for the acceptance of gay rabbis and gay synagogues as being a correct expression of Judaism. He argued that the Sodom and Gomorrah story in the Book of Genesis was not a condemnation of homosexuality, observing the crime of the people of Sodom and Gomorrah was that they were hostile and unfriendly towards strangers by wanting to gang-rape the two angels whom Lot had accepted as his guests. Finally, Feinberg argued that God loves peoples of both sexes equally, meaning that it was acceptable for women to serve as rabbis.

In 1983, Feinberg married Patricia C. Blanchard. In 1986, he died in Reno of cancer.

== Books by Feinberg ==
- Storm the Gates of Jericho (1964)
- Rabbi Feinberg's Hanoi Diary (1968)
- Sex and the Pulpit (1981).

== Books and articles ==
- Brown, V.S (December 1969). "Toronto Workshop". Amex. 2 (12): xv.
- Churchill, David (December 2010). "American Expatriates and the Building of Alternative Social Space in Toronto, 1965–1977". Urban History Review. 39 (1): 39–44. doi:10.7202/045106ar.
- Dynes, Wayne (1987). Routledge Revivals: Homosexuality: A Research Guide. London: Routledge. ISBN 1138280909.
- Feinberg, Abraham (11 January 1967). "Will the Jews Survive in the Soviet Union?". Congressional Record: Proceedings and Debates of the United States Congress.
- Feinberg, Abraham (1968). Rabbi Feinberg's Hanoi Diary. London: Longman's.
- Feinberg, Abraham (1981). Sex and the Pulpit. London: Methuen. ISBN 0458945501.
- Genizi, Haim (2002). The Holocaust, Israel, and Canadian Protestant Churches. Montreal: McGill University Press. ISBN 0773524010.
- Girard, Philip (2015). Bora Laskin: Bringing Law to Life. Toronto: University of Toronto Press. ISBN 978-1442616882.
- Goodman, Abram (March 1967). "Review of Storm the Gates of Jericho". American Jewish Historical Quarterly. 56 (3): 358–359.
- Levenson, Paul (January 1966). "Militant Reform Rabbi". Jewish Currents. 20 (1): 35–36.
- Levine, Allan (2018). Seeking the Fabled City: The Canadian Jewish Experience. Toronto: McClelland & Stewart. ISBN 978-0771048050.
- Luft, Eric von der (2009). Die at the Right Time!: A Subjective Cultural History of the American Sixties. North Syracuse, New York.: Gegensatz Press. ISBN 978-1933237398.
- Mehta, Harish C. (2018). People's Diplomacy of Vietnam: Soft Power in the Resistance War, 1965-1972. Cambridge: Cambridge University Press. ISBN 978-1527538757.
- Rafalko, Frank (2011). MH/CHAOS: The CIA'S Campaign Against the Radical New Left and the Black Panthers. Annapolis: Naval Institute Press. ISBN 978-1612510705.
- Saperstein, Marc (2009). "The Academic Study of Canadian Jewish Preachers". Jewish Journal. 23 (2): 107–116.
- Socknat, Thomas (January 2007). "Conscientious Objectors in the Context of Canadian Peace Movement". Journal of Mennonite Studies. 25 (1): 61–75.
- Stewart Logan, William (2000). Hanoi: Biography of a City. Randwick: University of New South Wales Press. ISBN 0868404438.
- Srebrnik, Henry (2008). Jerusalem on the Amur: Birobidzhan and the Canadian Jewish Communist Movement, 1924-1951. Montreal: McGill University Press. ISBN 978-0773575011.
- Stingel, Janine (2000). Social Discredit: Anti-Semitism, Social Credit, and the Jewish Response. Montreal: McGill University Press. ISBN 0773520104.
- Tulchinsky, Gerald (2001). "'Justice and Only Justice Thou Shall Pursue': Considerations on the Social Voice of Canada's Reform Rabbis". In Marguerite Van Die (ed.). Religion and Public Life in Canada: Historical and Comparative Perspectives. Toronto: University of Toronto Press. ISBN 0802082459.
- Tulchinsky, Gerald (2008). Canada's Jews: A People's Journey. Toronto: University of Toronto Press. ISBN 978-0802093868.
