= 2026 Belleville synagogue shooting =

Shooting in Ontario, Canada

- Sons of Jacob Synagogue in 2011
- Location: 44.1695945°N 77.3712367°W; Belleville, Ontario, Canada
- Date: September 20, 2026; 7:00 pm – 7:10 pm (Eastern Daylight Time)
- Target: Sons of Jacob synagogue
- Attack type: Ambush; shootout
- Weapon: Shotgun
- Deaths: 1 (the perpetrator)
- Injuries: 1 (police officer)
- Perpetrator: Sean Ward
- Defender: Belleville Police Service
- Motive: Antisemitism

On September 20, 2026, a shooting and a subsequent shootout occurred outside the Sons of Jacob Synagogue in Belleville, Ontario, Canada. The perpetrator, 29-year-old Sean Ward, was fatally shot, while a police officer protecting the synagogue was seriously injured.

Authorities said that Ward was targeting members of Belleville's Jewish community. Ward had previously expressed antisemitic and anti-immigrant beliefs, as well as conspiracy theories about COVID-19.

== Background ==
Belleville is a small city approximately 180 kilometres (110 mi) east of Toronto and 80 kilometres (50 mi) west of Kingston, Ontario. The Sons of Jacob Synagogue is a small synagogue with about 35 families as members, lacking a full-time rabbi, and the only one in or around Belleville.

== Shooting ==
Roughly a week prior to the shooting, congregants had observed a suspicious vehicle stationed outside the building, prompting them to report it to authorities. This led to a police officer being posted outside the building in an unmarked car to provide security on the day of the attack.

According to investigators, as worshippers were arriving for Erev Yom Kippur services at around 7:00 to 7:10 pm, the perpetrator first drove past the building as a reconnaissance and a short time later drove back through the same route and ambushed the police officer who was providing security to the synagogue. The officer, later identified as Constable Jeff Smith of the Belleville Police Service, was shot several times in the head and body. Smith was wounded before exiting his vehicle, but he confronted the attacker alone for around three minutes. At that time, a second officer, Constable Micheal McCurdy, responded to the scene and joined the gunfight. Up to 30 rounds were fired during the incident. Approximately 25 people were inside the synagogue during the shootout. Congregants sheltered on the floor of the synagogue while bullets penetrated the synagogue's stained-glass windows, causing about 20 holes in one of them, and struck the walls of its sanctuary. Nearby homes and vehicles were also struck.

The perpetrator, Sean Ward, sustained life-threatening injuries. He was armed with a shotgun, carried "a significant amount of ammunition on his person," and "also had 'combustible' materials in his vehicle." Ward died in hospital on September 21. According to authorities, Ward had the means and motive to commit a "mass casualty" event, and the incident was "a hate-motivated crime" in which members of Belleville's Jewish community were targeted. According to the Belleville Police Service, Ward shouted, "You are going to die for the Jews" during the attack. Police also said the perpetrator had multiple weapons, a significant amount of ammunition, and gasoline available to him. According to investigators, Ward did not have a firearms licence at the time of the attack, raising questions as to how he acquired the weapons used, and if others aided him.

== Perpetrator ==
The perpetrator was identified as 29-year-old Sean Ward, a resident of neighbouring Quinte West. He had served in the Canadian Armed Forces from 2017 to 2022 and was discharged due to refusing to take the COVID-19 vaccine. Ward had refused the vaccine on religious grounds and joined a lawsuit challenging the Canadian military's vaccine mandate. He had reportedly expressed conspiracy theories about COVID-19, including "blaming Jews for COVID-19".

According to one of his childhood friends, Ward had used the word "kike", an ethnic slur for Jews, in conversations. He also attempted to choose the username "kikekiller" while playing an online video game 18 days before the attack; the slur was censored, and he settled on "kitekiller" instead. Earlier in September, Ward told this friend that he was "depressed" and expressed anti-immigrant sentiment, blaming immigrants for his inability to find work. His friend also noticed changes regarding Ward during the summer months with him becoming slim when he was bulky before and getting "long, greasy hair" as well as becoming more withdrawn. When they last saw each other in person 18 days before the attack, he told Ward not to do anything stupid even tough times were tough.

== Reactions ==
The Ontario premier, Doug Ford, condemned the shooting and expressed support for the wounded officer and other first responders, as did the prime minister, Mark Carney, and the leader of the Official Opposition, Pierre Poilievre. Defence minister David McGuinty expressed great concern of the fact that the shooter was a former soldier.

Earlier that evening, before the shooting, New Democratic Party leader Avi Lewis, who is Jewish, had posted on X that he was marking Yom Kippur by "reflecting on the fact that we failed to do our part to stop an ongoing genocide committed in our name". Liberal MPs Anthony Housefather and Ben Carr, who are also Jewish, said the post wrongly held Jews collectively responsible for Israel's actions. Housefather called it "despicable", and Carr said it was "the type of narrative that is actually contributing to the type of threats that we're seeing levied against the Jewish community". The Canadian Press reported that advocates had linked the notion of collective Jewish responsibility to several attacks on Jewish institutions, including the one in Belleville, and the Centre for Israel and Jewish Affairs said that such rhetoric "can become a justification for targeting Jews here at home".

== See also ==
- Terrorism in Canada
- Antisemitism in Canada
