= Beth Israel Cemetery (Quebec City) =

Historic Jewish cemetery in Quebec City, Canada

- Cimetière Beth Israël
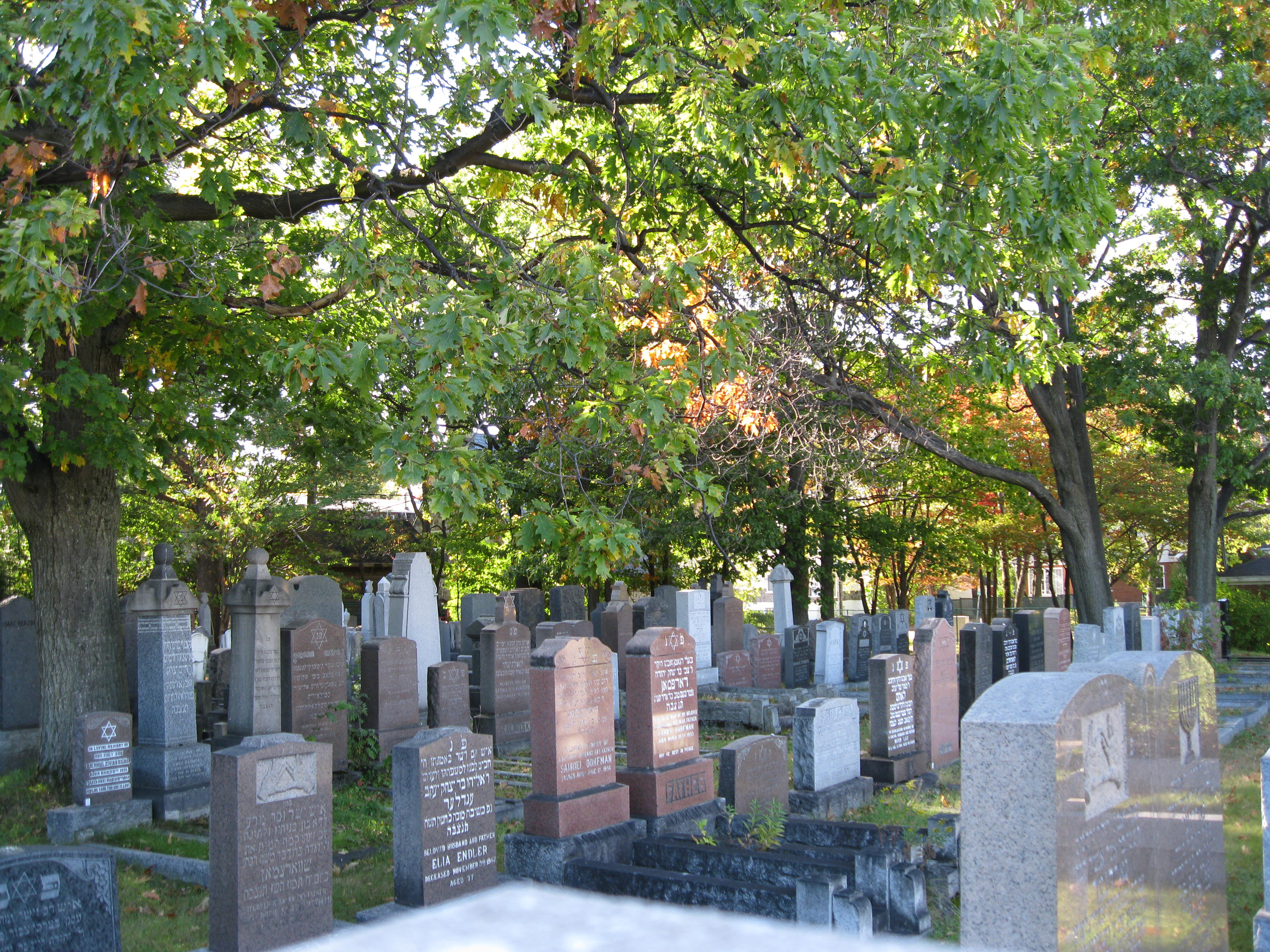
- Interactive map of Beth Israel Cemetery

Details
- Established: Between 1840 and 1858
- Location: René-Lévesque Boulevard West, Sainte-Foy–Sillery–Cap-Rouge, Quebec City, Quebec
- Country: Canada
- Coordinates: 46.7851°N 71.2606°W
- Type: Jewish cemetery
- Size: 1 acre (0.40 ha)
- No. of graves: About 300
- Find a Grave: Beth Israel Cemetery

National Historic Site of Canada
- Designated: 1992

Beth Israel Cemetery (cimetière Beth Israël) is a 1-acre (0.40 ha) Jewish cemetery on René-Lévesque Boulevard West in the borough of Sainte-Foy–Sillery–Cap-Rouge, Quebec City, Quebec, Canada. Established between 1840 and 1858 and later ceded to the city's Jewish congregation, now Congregation Beth Israel Ohev Sholem, it has been the burial ground of most of Quebec City's Jews since the second half of the 19th century. It was designated a National Historic Site of Canada in 1992.

== History ==
=== Origins ===
Jews were not permitted to settle in New France and first came to Quebec City after the British conquest of 1759. Although their presence in the city dates from the late 18th century, the community only became large enough to form a congregation in the mid-19th century. A congregation, Beth Israel, made up mainly of English and German merchants, was organized in the early 1850s, and the city's first synagogue opened in 1852.

Between 1840 and 1858, a Jewish merchant bought the land for the cemetery and had it consecrated. The site lay outside the city limits because of new municipal ordinances, adopted after earlier outbreaks of cholera, that were intended to prevent the spread of the disease. The oldest graves date from 1862.

=== Transfer to the congregation ===
By the turn of the 20th century, the original, largely English-speaking community had dwindled, and newer congregations had been formed by Jewish immigrants from Eastern Europe. According to Parks Canada, the cemetery was ceded to the congregation in 1894. A key to the cemetery preserved by the community is inscribed as presented to Louis Lazarovitz, a St. Joseph Street shopkeeper, by the Congregation Beth Israel on September 6, 1906; the property had been bequeathed to the synagogue by its English owner. Beth Israel amalgamated with the Ohev Sholom congregation in 1927.

=== 1990 desecration ===
In May 1990, vandals overturned 31 gravestones in the cemetery and spray-painted them with swastikas and the letters "ZOG", an acronym for the antisemitic Zionist Occupation Government conspiracy theory. It was the first such attack in the Quebec City area and followed the desecration of two Jewish cemeteries in the Montreal area since August 1989. In a joint statement, the Quebec region of the Canadian Jewish Congress and the League for Human Rights of B'nai Brith Canada called on the Quebec minister of public security to mount "an intensive, coordinated effort to find those responsible".

=== National Historic Site ===
The cemetery was designated a National Historic Site of Canada on June 10, 1992, for its age, its burial house, the linear layout of its graves, the design of its grave markers and its Jewish religious symbols, which together make it a representative example of a burial ground in the Jewish cultural tradition.

== Description ==
The cemetery is rectangular and stands in a transitional area between commercial and residential districts near Université Laval. It is enclosed along René-Lévesque Boulevard West by a low stone wall topped with an iron railing, and is landscaped simply with trees, shrubs and two gravel paths. A funeral house stands on the grounds.

Its approximately 300 gravestones are set close together in straight rows, reflecting the Jewish principles that burial is the only permitted means of disposing of the dead and that all are equal in death. Most markers are plain and bear Hebrew inscriptions; Greek Revival monuments such as obelisks and columns appear only from the end of the 19th century. Symbols carved on the stones include Sabbath candlesticks, blessing hands, the pitcher and basin, the lion, books and the Star of David. Some graves are bordered by masonry retaining walls or by iron or masonry fences.

The Roman Catholic Saint-Michel de Sillery Cemetery lies nearby on René-Lévesque Boulevard West; former Premier of Quebec René Lévesque was buried there on November 5, 1987.

== Notable burials ==
Gravestone of Benjamin Ortenberg (died 1921)

- Benjamin Ortenberg (died 1921), clothing merchant and plaintiff in Ortenberg v. Plamondon (1914), an early Canadian lawsuit against antisemitic speech

== See also ==
- Mount Hermon Cemetery
- List of National Historic Sites of Canada in Quebec City
