= Finkelman =

Finkelman is a surname. Notable people with the surname include:

- Alex Finkelman (born 1986), American politician
- Jacob Finkelman (1907–2003), Canadian legal scholar
- Paul Finkelman (born 1949), American legal historian
