= Antisemitism in Canada =

Overview of antisemitism in Canada

Antisemitism in Canada is hostility, prejudice or discrimination directed at Canadian Jews or Judaism as a religious, ethnic or racial group. For much of the country's history it was not confined to extremists: it was voiced in Parliament and the press, taught in some schools and churches, and written into immigration policy, university admissions and property deeds.

The earliest recorded case is usually dated to 1808, when Ezekiel Hart was barred from the Legislative Assembly of Lower Canada in a dispute over his oath. In the late 19th and early 20th centuries, anti-Jewish ideas were spread by the writer Goldwin Smith, the nationalist Henri Bourassa and parts of the Catholic press in Quebec. Between the world wars, Jews across Canada faced quotas, restrictive covenants and exclusion from jobs, hospital posts, clubs and resorts; organized hostility ranged from boycotts of Jewish businesses in Quebec to Adrien Arcand's fascist movement, and violence peaked in Toronto's Christie Pits riot of 1933. As Nazi persecution intensified, the federal government admitted fewer than 5,000 Jewish refugees between 1933 and 1945, one of the worst records of any Western country.

After the Second World War, human rights laws, court rulings and changing attitudes dismantled most formal barriers, and by the 1970s and 1980s Jews held prominent positions throughout Canadian society. Antisemitism persisted in vandalism, hate propaganda and Holocaust denial, which gave rise to landmark prosecutions such as those of James Keegstra and Ernst Zündel.

Since the October 7 attacks on Israel in 2023 and the ensuing Gaza war, recorded antisemitic incidents in Canada have reached their highest levels since national monitoring began in 1982. Jews, about one per cent of the population, have been the target of roughly 70 per cent of police-reported hate crimes motivated by religion. Jewish schools and synagogues have been struck by gunfire and firebombs, and on the eve of Yom Kippur in 2026 a gunman who shouted "you're going to die for the Jews" opened fire outside a synagogue in Belleville, Ontario.

== History ==
=== Colonial period and 19th century ===
Jews began settling in what is now Canada in the 1760s. Among the first was Aaron Hart, a merchant of Trois-Rivières who is often called the father of Canadian Jewry.

On April 11, 1807, his son Ezekiel Hart won a by-election in Trois-Rivières for the Legislative Assembly of Lower Canada. Because the vote fell on the Sabbath, he deferred some formalities, including his oath, and his opponents challenged the result almost at once. When he was sworn in the following January, he used the form then customary for Jews rather than swearing "on the true faith of a Christian". On February 20, 1808, the Assembly resolved by 35 votes to 5 that "Ezekiel Hart, Esquire, professing the Jewish religion cannot take a seat, nor sit, nor vote, in this House." Re-elected in 1808, Hart took the oath in its Christian form, but the Assembly expelled him again in 1809, and London ruled that a Jew could not sit in the legislature. Politics also played a part: the Parti canadien majority opposed Hart partly because he supported the rival English party, and historian Irving Abella suggested that the expulsion may have owed as much to his politics as to his religion. The episode is known as the Hart Affair (l'affaire Hart).

Hart's sons and his brother Benjamin continued to press for equal rights. A bill extending to Jews the same political rights as Christians was introduced in March 1831 and received royal assent on June 5, 1832, some 25 years before comparable rights were granted elsewhere in the British Empire.

The most influential antisemite of the later 19th century was the writer and critic Goldwin Smith, who in dozens of books, articles and letters described Jews as "parasites" and "enemies of civilization". His views shaped a generation of younger Canadians, among them William Lyon Mackenzie King and Henri Bourassa. In 1905, drawing heavily on Smith, Bourassa urged the House of Commons to keep Canada closed to Jewish immigrants, in what Abella described as the most explicitly anti-Jewish speech in the chamber's history.

=== Early 20th century ===
In Quebec, the Catholic Church associated Jews with modernism, liberalism and other doctrines it considered dangerous. From the 1880s to the 1940s, Catholic periodicals such as La Vérité and L'Action sociale, and activists such as Jules-Paul Tardivel, spread anti-Jewish ideas throughout the province.

On March 30, 1910, the Quebec City notary Jacques-Édouard Plamondon gave a lecture to a Catholic youth association, drawn largely from French antisemitic writers such as Édouard Drumont, in which he called the Jew the enemy of Christians' faith, lives, honour and property and urged his audience to stop patronizing Jewish merchants. The lecture was printed as a pamphlet. That June, a group of boys insulted and assaulted Jews in the city and broke windows at the synagogue and at the home of the shopkeeper Benjamin Ortenberg. Ortenberg and Louis Lazarovitz, president of the local congregation, sued Plamondon and his printer for libel. The Superior Court dismissed the action in 1913 on the ground that the speech attacked Jews in general rather than any individual, but on December 28, 1914, the Court of King's Bench held that members of a small community could sue for libel directed at that community and ordered Plamondon and the printer to pay Ortenberg $50 and $25 respectively. The case is regarded as an early landmark of legal action against hate speech in Canada.

=== Interwar period and the Second World War ===
From the 1920s the priest and historian Lionel Groulx lent antisemitism intellectual standing among Quebec's clergy, politicians, teachers and journalists. Church and nationalist leaders promoted the Achat chez nous ("buy from our own") campaign, a boycott of Jewish businesses intended to drive Jews from the province, and Jews were for years excluded from Quebec's confessional school boards, even though they made up only about one per cent of the province's population.

Antisemitism was just as present in English Canada, where it was widespread in organizations such as the Orange Order, the Native Sons of Canada and the Social Credit movement. In the 1920s and 1930s many industries would not hire Jews, Jewish doctors could not obtain hospital appointments, there were no Jewish judges, and most law firms would not employ Jewish lawyers. McGill University informally limited Jewish enrolment to about 10 per cent from 1926, and some university programs in Ontario continued to discriminate against Jewish students into the 1960s. Signs reading "No Jews or Dogs Allowed" or "Gentiles Only" appeared at golf courses in Halifax, hotels in the Laurentians, Ontario beaches and resorts, and vacation areas in Manitoba and British Columbia. Restrictive covenants registered on deeds barred the sale or rental of property to Jews and other groups, and the courts enforced them.

Tensions turned violent in Toronto in the summer of 1933. After swastikas and Nazi slogans appeared on the city's eastern beaches and Jewish bathers were harassed, the display of a swastika at a baseball game in Christie Pits park on August 16 set off six hours of fighting between Jewish and non-Jewish youths, one of the worst outbreaks of ethnic violence in Canadian history.

In 1934, Adrien Arcand founded the Parti national social chrétien in Montreal, modelled on the Nazi party; it organized antisemitic rallies, boycotts and propaganda and inspired similar groups elsewhere in Canada. In 1938, a national fascist convention was held at Toronto's Massey Hall.

The same year Arcand founded his party, interns at Montreal's Hôpital Notre-Dame walked off the job to protest the appointment of Samuel Rabinovitch, a Jewish graduate of the Université de Montréal, as senior intern, refusing to care for any patients, including emergencies. After four days Rabinovitch resigned. The strike became known as the "Days of Shame". Rabinovitch completed his training in St. Louis, Missouri, and later returned to practise in Montreal.

Antisemitism also reached the highest levels of the federal government. Prime Minister Mackenzie King privately worried that Jewish immigration would "pollute" Canada's bloodstream, and his government kept the country's doors all but closed to Jews fleeing Nazi Europe. In June 1939, the 907 Jewish refugees aboard the MS St. Louis, already refused by Cuba and the United States, were denied entry to Canada; the ship returned to Europe, where many of its passengers were later killed in the Holocaust. The government had received a petition by Canadian clergy to admit some of the passengers; it was ignored.

In None Is Too Many (1982), historians Irving Abella and Harold Troper showed that Canada admitted fewer than 5,000 Jewish refugees between 1933 and 1945, while the United States took in more than 200,000 and Britain about 70,000. The book's title comes from the reply of an unnamed senior official asked in 1945 how many Jews Canada would admit after the war. Later research based on the statistician Louis Rosenberg's data has argued that the total number of Jewish arrivals in the period was higher than the book's figure.

A 1943 Gallup poll ranked Jews third, after the Japanese and Germans, among the least desirable immigrants to Canada. During the 1944 Quebec general election, Maurice Duplessis falsely claimed that the federal and provincial Liberal governments had made a secret deal with an "International Zionist Brotherhood" to settle 100,000 Jewish refugees in Quebec after the war in exchange for campaign contributions. Union Nationale pamphlets illustrated the claim with antisemitic caricatures, and the story was widely believed and helped Duplessis win. His biographer Conrad Black argued that Duplessis was not personally antisemitic but exploited a prejudice widespread among voters.

=== Post-war decline ===
Discrimination remained open after the war. In 1948, Pierre Berton tested it for Maclean's: two young women applied for the same jobs, one as "Grimes" and the other as "Greenberg". Grimes was interviewed almost everywhere, while Greenberg was told positions had been filled or received no reply, and some employers told Berton outright that they did not hire Jews. Letters to 29 summer resorts signed "Marshall" secured twice as many bookings as identical letters signed "Rosenberg".

Over the following decades, legislation and the courts dismantled formal barriers. In Re Drummond Wren (1945) an Ontario court declared void, as contrary to public policy, a covenant forbidding the sale of land to Jews, and in Noble v Alley (1950) the Supreme Court of Canada refused to enforce a covenant barring Jews and Black people from owning cottages in a resort subdivision. Human rights commissions, the Canadian Charter of Rights and Freedoms and numerous statutes and judgments eventually prohibited the discrimination once common against Jews and other minorities, and by the 1970s and 1980s most barriers had fallen.

Organized hate did not disappear. On May 30, 1965, a rally by the neo-Nazi John Beattie in Toronto's Allan Gardens was broken up by thousands of counter-protesters, many of them Holocaust survivors. The same year the federal government appointed a Special Committee on Hate Propaganda, chaired by Maxwell Cohen, whose 1966 report led Parliament to add hate propaganda offences to the Criminal Code in 1970.

=== Hate propaganda and Holocaust denial ===
Holocaust denial became the focus of several prosecutions in the 1980s. James Keegstra, a high-school teacher in Eckville, Alberta, taught his students for years that Jews were conspiring to control the world and that the Holocaust was a hoax, and penalized those who did not reproduce his views in class and in examinations. He was convicted in 1985 of wilfully promoting hatred against an identifiable group. In R v Keegstra (1990), the Supreme Court of Canada held that the offence limits freedom of expression but that the limit is justified. Ernst Zündel, a publisher of Holocaust-denial literature, was twice convicted of spreading false news, but in R v Zundel (1992) the Court struck down the false news provision as unconstitutional. In 2022, Parliament amended the Criminal Code to make it an offence to wilfully promote antisemitism by condoning, denying or downplaying the Holocaust. On September 18, 2025, a 51-year-old man became the first and so far only person convicted under the law in Canada.

== Measuring antisemitism ==
Two sources are most often used to track antisemitism in Canada. B'nai Brith Canada has published an annual audit of antisemitic incidents since 1982. It is based on reports made to the organization and includes harassment and online abuse that do not amount to crimes. Statistics Canada publishes police-reported hate crime figures, which count only incidents police classify as hate-motivated crimes and which are acknowledged to understate the true number.

Antisemitic incidents and hate crimes in Canada, 2022–2025
Year	B'nai Brith audit (all reported incidents)	Police-reported hate crimes targeting Jews
2022	2,769	527
2023	5,791	959
2024	6,219	920
2025	6,800	788
Sources: B'nai Brith Canada audits; Statistics Canada. Police-reported figures are revised as investigations conclude.

== Late 20th century to 2023 ==
Antisemitism remained a concern into the 21st century. Vandalism was the most common form; in April 2012, for example, several Jewish-owned cottages in Val-Morin in the Laurentians were broken into and daubed with swastikas. Toronto Police Service reports for 2014 and 2015 found Jews to be the group most often targeted by hate crimes in the city; in 2015 they were the victims in about 23 per cent of all hate crimes, although they made up 3.8 per cent of the city's religious population. A 2014 survey by the Anti-Defamation League estimated that 14 per cent of Canadian adults held a substantial number of antisemitic attitudes.

In 2010 a federal adjudicator ruled that a Jewish employee at the Ottawa headquarters of Passport Canada had been discriminated against because of her religious observance, including leaving early on Fridays for the Sabbath, and that her managers had done little to protect her from harassment that escalated to anonymous messages calling her a Mossad agent and threatening her life.

During the 2014 Quebec general election, the Centre for Israel and Jewish Affairs (CIJA) criticized Premier Pauline Marois for defending the Parti Québécois candidate Louise Mailloux, who had likened circumcision to rape and written that kosher and halal certification raised food prices to fund religious causes abroad, an echo of the kosher tax conspiracy theory. CIJA dismissed Mailloux's subsequent apology as inadequate.

In November 2019 an executive of the University of Toronto Graduate Students' Union suggested that the union would be reluctant to back a campaign by Hillel for kosher food on campus because Hillel was "pro-Israel". The union apologized, but Hillel said the apology did not address the antisemitic nature of the original response.

=== Israel and the "new antisemitism" debate ===
From the 2000s, much of the public debate turned on the relationship between hostility to Israel and antisemitism. In 2009 members of Parliament from the major federal parties formed the Canadian Parliamentary Coalition to Combat Antisemitism to examine what its supporters call the new antisemitism, in which hostility to Jews is expressed through hostility to Israel. Its supporters pointed to boycott campaigns and events such as Israeli Apartheid Week at Concordia, York and the University of Toronto. In February 2009, Jewish students at York barricaded themselves in the campus Hillel office during a confrontation with pro-Palestinian protesters, some of whom shouted antisemitic slurs, and police escorted the students out.

Canada joined the International Holocaust Remembrance Alliance in 2009 and in 2019 adopted its working definition of antisemitism as part of its federal anti-racism strategy. In 2020 former justice minister Irwin Cotler was appointed the first Special Envoy on Preserving Holocaust Remembrance and Combatting Antisemitism; Deborah Lyons succeeded him in October 2023. How to define antisemitism, and in particular how to treat anti-Zionism, has remained contested, including among Canadian Jews.

== Since October 2023 ==
=== Scale ===
Antisemitic incidents rose sharply after the October 7 attacks. B'nai Brith recorded 5,791 incidents in 2023, 6,219 in 2024 and 6,800 in 2025, each the highest since its audit began; more than 6,200 of the 2025 incidents took place online. Police-reported hate crimes against Jews rose 82 per cent in 2023, and Jews were the target of about 70 per cent of police-reported hate crimes motivated by religion in both 2024 and 2025.

Attacks also became more violent. By mid-July 2026, B'nai Brith had documented 27 violent antisemitic incidents for the year, compared with 10 in all of 2025. That month, Global News reported that an assessment by the Integrated Terrorism Assessment Centre found that authorities had disrupted four violent extremist plots against Jewish targets, inspired by the Islamic State, since the war began.

Surveys reflected the effect on the community. In 2024, CIJA reported that 82 per cent of Canadian Jews felt less safe since October 7, and a survey by the Jewish Medical Association of Ontario found that nearly a third of the province's Jewish physicians were considering leaving Canada because of antisemitism.

=== Attacks on Jewish institutions and businesses ===
During the night between November 6-7, 2023, firebombs damaged Congregation Beth Tikvah and the nearby offices of Federation CJA in Dollard-des-Ormeaux. Two days later, two Jewish schools in Montreal--United Talmud Torah and Yeshiva Gedolah--were struck by gunfire overnight. In May 2024, bullet holes were found in a Montreal building housing the Belz school and the Young Israel of Montreal synagogue, and the doorway of the Schara Tzedeck synagogue in Vancouver was set on fire. In August 2024, more than 100 Jewish institutions across the country received the same bomb threat.

The Bais Chaya Mushka girls' elementary school in North York, Toronto, was shot at three times in 2024: in May, on Yom Kippur in October, and in December. No one was hurt, as the shootings took place when the building was empty. Police charged a 20-year-old man and a 17-year-old in connection with the October shooting. Days before the third shooting, Congregation Beth Tikvah was firebombed a second time.

In February 2025, Temple Emanu-El-Beth Sholom in Westmount was defaced with antisemitic graffiti; in June 2026 it was vandalized again and targeted in an attempted arson, and a suspect was arrested and charged. On August 8, 2025, an elderly Jewish woman was stabbed while shopping at an Ottawa supermarket known for its kosher meat counter; police charged a 71-year-old Cornwall man in what they described as a hate-motivated attack.

On January 2, 2026, swastikas were spray-painted on the entrance of Congregation Shaarey Zedek in Winnipeg. In March 2026, gunfire struck Temple Emanu-El in North York shortly after a Purim celebration, and days later the Shaarei Shomayim synagogue in Toronto and Beth Avraham Yoseph of Toronto in Vaughan. In July 2026, one Toronto branch of the Jewish-owned Kiva's Bagel Bar was hit by gunfire and another had a window smashed, and in early August a fire investigated as arson gutted Nöam, a kosher restaurant in Montreal.

==== Belleville synagogue shooting ====
On September 20, 2026, as worshippers were arriving for Kol Nidre services on the eve of Yom Kippur, a gunman opened fire on a police officer guarding the Sons of Jacob Synagogue in Belleville, Ontario. A second officer joined the exchange of fire. Constable Jeff Smith of the Belleville Police Service was seriously wounded, and the gunman died of his injuries the next day. The 29-year-old had served in the Canadian Armed Forces from 2017 to 2022 and had voiced conspiracy theories blaming Jews for COVID-19. Police said he shouted "you're going to die for the Jews" before firing and had several weapons, a large amount of ammunition and gasoline with him, and they described the shooting as a targeted attack on the Jewish community. Shortly before the shooting, Avi Lewis, the Jewish leader of the New Democratic Party, had posted on X that he was marking Yom Kippur by reflecting that "we failed to do our part to stop an ongoing genocide committed in our name". Liberal MPs Anthony Housefather and Ben Carr, who are also Jewish, condemned the post for holding Jews collectively responsible for Israel's actions, a notion that Jewish advocates have linked to attacks on Jewish institutions, including the one in Belleville. Less than two weeks later, antisemitic flyers were found around the synagogue and in nearby neighbourhoods. Flyer campaigns by neo-Nazi groups such as the Goyim Defense League had already been a recurring source of incidents; in June 2026, for example, a 15-year-old was charged after antisemitic flyers were left at homes in Orillia, Ontario, on three occasions.

=== Schools and universities ===
Jewish pupils reported harassment, threats and assaults by classmates, some invoking the October 7 attacks; in May 2024 community members in Toronto began escorting Jewish children after they received death threats from schoolmates. A July 2025 report by the special envoy's office documented 781 antisemitic incidents reported in Ontario's elementary and secondary schools between October 7, 2023, and January 2025. A federal survey of Jewish post-secondary students published in August 2026, the Campus Antisemitism and Student Experiences (CASE) report, found that 95.7 per cent had experienced or witnessed antisemitism in the previous 12 months and that 68 per cent did not consider their campus safe and inclusive for Jewish students.

=== Labour unions ===
Some unions faced accusations of antisemitism from their own Jewish members. The day after the October 7 attacks, Fred Hahn, president of CUPE Ontario, posted that he was thankful for "the power of resistance" around the world. A group of Jewish CUPE members, about 80 according to their lawyer, filed a complaint with the Human Rights Tribunal of Ontario alleging systemic antisemitism by Hahn and CUPE Ontario. In August 2024, after Hahn shared a video about Israel's participation in the Paris Olympics that Jewish members called hurtful, CUPE's national executive board asked him to resign as a general vice-president of the national union, saying the video clearly violated the union's equality statement. Hahn apologized for sharing the video but rejected the charge of antisemitism and declined to step down. In early 2026 he announced that he would not seek re-election as CUPE Ontario president.

In July 2024, a group of Jewish teachers filed a complaint with the British Columbia Human Rights Tribunal alleging that the BC Teachers' Federation had "engaged in and enabled antisemitism". The complaint cited more than two dozen examples, including anti-racism materials sent to members that linked to a poster reading "Zionists F*ck Off". The federation said it took the concerns seriously, and the tribunal agreed to expedite the case.

=== Political and community responses ===
In July 2024 Prime Minister Justin Trudeau named Anthony Housefather, the Jewish MP for Mount Royal, his Special Advisor on Jewish Community Relations and Antisemitism. That month, flyers posted in Montreal depicted Housefather as a neo-Nazi with a swastika on an Israeli flag; Special Envoy Lyons said they targeted not only Housefather but all Jewish Canadians. After the third shooting at Bais Chaya Mushka, Israel's Minister of Diaspora Affairs, Amichai Chikli, declared that Canada was no longer safe for Jews; Housefather called the statement false and exaggerated, saying that despite the rise in antisemitism Canada remained one of the best places in the world for Jews to live.

On March 6, 2025, federal, provincial, territorial and municipal governments, police services and prosecutors met in Ottawa at a National Forum on Combatting Antisemitism, where government and police representatives endorsed a joint statement of intent to strengthen enforcement and prosecution. Lyons retired in July 2025. In February 2026 the government of Mark Carney abolished the special envoy positions on antisemitism and Islamophobia in favour of a Ministerial Advisory Council on Rights, Equality and Inclusion. In a speech at Toronto's Holy Blossom Temple on June 1, 2026, Carney said that Canada's civic compact was "failing Jewish Canadians" and named the council's members, with addressing antisemitism as its first responsibility. B'nai Brith and CIJA criticized the plan, saying it lacked enforcement and failed to confront anti-Zionism.

The Combatting Hate Act received royal assent on June 18, 2026, and came into force on July 18. It created a stand-alone hate crime offence, made it an offence to promote hatred by publicly displaying certain hate and terrorist symbols, and added protections against intimidating or obstructing people at places of worship, schools and community centres.

== See also ==
- History of the Jews in Canada
- Racism in Canada
- Hate speech laws in Canada
- Jewish quota
- Universities and antisemitism
