= Benjamin Ortenberg =

Canadian merchant and libel plaintiff

- Ortenberg's gravestone in Beth Israel Cemetery, Quebec City
- Born: c. 1881
- Died: March 20, 1921; Quebec City, Quebec, Canada
- Resting place: Beth Israel Cemetery, Quebec City
- Other name: Ben Zion Ortenberg
- Occupation: Clothing merchant
- Known for: Plaintiff in Ortenberg v. Plamondon (1914)

Benjamin Ortenberg (c. 1881 – March 20, 1921) was a Jewish clothing merchant in the Saint-Roch district of Quebec City who brought one of the first lawsuits in Canada against antisemitic speech. After the notary Jacques-Édouard Plamondon gave a lecture in 1910 depicting Jews as enemies of Christians and urging a boycott of Jewish shops, the windows of Ortenberg's home were broken and his trade fell off. He sued Plamondon and the lecture's printer, René Leduc, for defamation. The Superior Court of Quebec dismissed his action in 1913, holding that an attack on Jews in general did not defame any individual Jew, but the Court of King's Bench (now the Quebec Court of Appeal) reversed that decision in December 1914. The appeal court held that, because the Jewish community of Quebec City was small enough for each of its members to be identified, Plamondon's attack on it was a personal defamation of Ortenberg. The judgment, Ortenberg v. Plamondon, is regarded as the foundation of the recognition of group defamation in Quebec law and is still cited by Canadian courts.

== Early life ==
Ortenberg was born around 1881 to David Ortenberg and Chaie Clara Barsam. His father, born David Shchupak, had taken the surname Ortenberg from his brother-in-law. The family was living in Suczawa, in the Austrian crown land of Bukovina (now Suceava, Romania), when Ortenberg, recorded as Benzian, sailed from Hamburg with his mother and three siblings on May 4, 1894, aboard the steamship German Empire, bound for Quebec.

The family settled in Quebec City, in the Jacques-Cartier ward. At some point, he married Fanny Riger, but the marriage did not last. By 1910 he was running a clothing shop at 85 rue Saint-Joseph in Saint-Roch, a working-class district of the city.. His home stood across the street from Plamondon's. Quebec City's Jewish community, made up largely of recent immigrants from Eastern Europe, then numbered about 75 families in a city of some 80,000 people.

== Plamondon's lecture and its aftermath ==
On March 30, 1910, Plamondon delivered a lecture titled Le Juif ("The Jew") under the auspices of the Cercle Charest of the Association catholique de la jeunesse canadienne-française, at the École du Sacré-Cœur, a school run by the Brothers of the Christian Schools in Saint-Roch. Drawing on antisemitic writers such as Édouard Drumont, he told his audience that the Jew was the enemy of their faith, their lives, their honour and their property, and attributed to the Talmud teachings that permitted crimes against Christians, including ritual murder. Near the end of the lecture he complained of Sunday work at a garment shop on rue Saint-Joseph and asked his listeners to stop buying from Jews and to stop renting or selling houses to them. The text was published in the antisemitic weekly La Libre Parole on April 16, 1910, and was printed as a pamphlet by René Leduc.

In early June 1910, groups of youths repeated Plamondon's accusations to Jews in the streets, assaulted several of them, and threw stones through the windows of the synagogue and of Ortenberg's home. Seven boys aged 12 and 13 were charged in the Recorder's Court, and five were fined. Ortenberg was taunted as "le Juif" in the street, and customers who had dealt with him began to avoid his shop.

== Lawsuit ==
Before suing, Ortenberg wrote to Plamondon offering him $500 if he could prove the accusations made in the lecture and demanding a public retraction; Plamondon did not reply. In May 1910 Ortenberg and Louis Lazarovitz, president of the city's Jewish congregation, each brought an action for libel against Plamondon as the speaker and Leduc as the printer. (Note: The Canadian Encyclopedia dates the start of the proceedings to April 27, 1910. Normand dates Ortenberg's writ of summons to May 16, 1910, and Lazarovitz's to May 9, 1910.) Ortenberg's declaration alleged that Plamondon had acted with malice to harm him and his co-religionists, and claimed $500 for the injury to his honour and the loss of part of his clientele. Plamondon's plea was that he had attacked only the Jewish race and its doctrines, not the plaintiff, that his accusations were true and in the public interest, and that he did not know Ortenberg.

Ortenberg retained Lawrence Arthur Cannon, later a justice of the Supreme Court of Canada, while Lazarovitz engaged three Montreal lawyers led by Samuel William Jacobs, with Louis Fitch. Montreal's Jewish community helped to fund the litigation. Plamondon was represented by Eusèbe Belleau and Leduc by Joseph-Édouard Bédard, with Jules-Alfred Lane acting as counsel for both.

=== Trial ===
The two cases were tried together before Justice Albert Malouin of the Superior Court from May 19 to 22, 1913, and drew wide public attention. Ortenberg was the first witness. He began by stating that he was a British subject, and described the attacks on his family and his financial losses. Explaining why he had sued, he testified that if Plamondon had given "another couple of lectures", he would have needed a police escort to walk from his shop to his home. (Note: Ortenberg's testimony was given in French: "Si je n'avais pas poursuivi, si le notaire Plamondon avait fait encore une couple de conférences, j'aurais été obligé d'avoir une garde d'honneur de police pour aller de mon magasin à ma maison privée." Quoted in Normand (2007), p. 489.) Under cross-examination by Cannon, Plamondon agreed that his accusations applied to Quebec City, and when asked which of the city's Jews he had excepted in calling for a boycott, answered, "I excepted none". (Note: "Je n'en exceptais aucun." Quoted in Normand (2007), p. 494.)

The plaintiffs' expert witness, Rabbi Herman Abramowitz of Shaar Hashomayim in Montreal, testified on the Talmud, which he had studied for some 25 years, and challenged the defence's account of it. The defence called three Catholic priests, Joseph-Arthur D'Amours, Joseph-Émery Grandbois and Jean-Thomas Nadeau, none of whom could read the Talmud in the original.

On October 22, 1913, Malouin dismissed both actions. He held that a lecture which attacked the Jewish community in general, without naming or specially designating the plaintiffs, gave them no personal right of action.

=== Appeal ===
Ortenberg appealed at once. The appeal was heard by Chief Justice Horace Archambeault and Justices Norman William Trenholme, Alexander George Cross, Henry George Carroll and Louis-Rodolphe Roy, the last sitting ad hoc. In a unanimous judgment delivered in late December 1914, (Note: The Dictionary of Canadian Biography gives December 28, 1914; The Canadian Law Times report is headed December 29, 1914, the day on which the decision was reported in the Montreal Gazette.) the court reversed the trial judgment.

Writing for the court, Justice Carroll accepted that attacks on a race, however violent, did not in themselves give rise to an action in damages, but held that a member of a group could sue where the group was small enough that the defamation reached each of its members. The object of the lecture, he found, was "to put the public on guard against the Jews of Quebec, numbering 75 families", and none of the experts called by the defence had shown that the Talmud taught what Plamondon claimed. Plamondon, he wrote, was not condemned for attacking the Jewish race or religion, but for having attributed to "all and each of the 75 Jewish families of Quebec" the wish to commit the crimes of which their race was accused; "In that, there is personal defamation." Finding that Plamondon had acted in good faith, the court awarded Ortenberg $50 against him and $25 against Leduc, with all costs.

In separate concurring reasons, Justice Cross held that Plamondon's call to stop buying from Jews was an invitation to boycott "the handful of Jewish traders in the City of Quebec", which had been "accepted and acted upon", and that Ortenberg could recover under article 1053 of the Civil Code of Lower Canada for words maliciously spoken that caused him loss, whether or not they amounted to libel. The judgment was reported at (1915) 24 B.R. 69 and 385, and in English translation at (1915) 35 C.L.T. 262.

== Significance ==
The case is generally known as the "Plamondon affair" rather than by the plaintiff's name, which Normand attributes to its having been fought as much in public opinion as in court. It was probably the first attempt in Canada to fight antisemitism through the courts, and historian Joshua MacFadyen describes it as pointing the way "from grassroots protest to the legal protection of civil rights". Legal historian Constance Backhouse calls the appeal decision a high-water mark in the law of group defamation, though one that led to little further development.

The decision's limits soon became apparent: it protected only small, identifiable communities and left libels against larger groups beyond the reach of the courts. In 1932, when a bill to allow injunctions against group libel was debated in the Legislative Assembly of Quebec, the member Joseph Cohen, a former clerk of Jacobs, cited the Plamondon case to show the gaps in the law; the bill was defeated. Ortenberg v. Plamondon has been cited in Quebec defamation cases, by courts in other jurisdictions, and in common-law treatises on libel. In 2011 the Supreme Court of Canada referred to it in Bou Malhab v. Diffusion Métromédia CMR inc., a proposed class action over a radio host's remarks about Montreal taxi drivers whose mother tongue was Arabic or Creole.

== Death ==
Ortenberg died in Quebec City and was buried in the Beth Israel Cemetery on March 20, 1921, at the age of 40. His gravestone gives the date of his death as March 20, 1921, and his Hebrew name as Ben Zion bar David.
