= List of National Historic Sites of Canada in Quebec City =

This is a list of National Historic Sites (French: Lieux historiques nationaux) in Quebec City, Quebec. There are 37 National Historic Sites in Quebec City and its enclaves, of which seven are administered by Parks Canada (identified below by the beaver icon ). The first National Historic Site to be designated in Quebec City was Fort Charlesbourg Royal in 1923.

Numerous National Historic Events also occurred in Quebec City, and are identified at places associated with them, using the same style of federal plaque which marks National Historic Sites. Several National Historic Persons are commemorated throughout the city in the same way. The markers do not indicate which designation—a Site, Event, or Person—a subject has been given.

National Historic Sites located elsewhere in Quebec are listed at National Historic Sites in Quebec, and, for Montreal, at National Historic Sites in Montreal.

This list uses names designated by the national Historic Sites and Monuments Board, which may differ from other names for these sites.

Historic District of Old Quebec World Heritage Site unit

== National Historic Sites ==
Media related to National Historic Sites in Quebec City at Wikimedia Commons

Site	Date(s)	Designated	Location	Description	Image
57-63 St. Louis Street	1705-1811 (period of construction)	1969	Quebec City; 46°48′39.35″N 71°12′30.53″W	Three early eighteenth and nineteenth century stone houses within the walls of Quebec City's Upper Town at the foot of Cavelier du Moulin Park; a notable grouping of buildings from the French Regime	View of St. Louis Street, with 57-63 St. Louis Street visible on the left side of the photograph
Bélanger-Girardin House	1735 (completed)	1982	Beauport; 46°51′33.32″N 71°11′31.09″W	A one-and-a-half-storey stone house with a steep roof located in Beauport, one of the first seigneuries of New France; one of the few remaining early French Regime houses erected in the (then) countryside near Quebec City	View of Bélanger-Girardin House
Beth Israël Cemetery	1840-58 (acquisition of land)	1992	Quebec City; 46°47′4.15″N 71°15′34.79″W	Since the 19th century, most members of Quebec City's Jewish community have been interred in this cemetery; its age, burial house, linear spatial arrangement, grave marker designs and symbols make it an excellent representative example of a burial ground in the Jewish cultural tradition	View of Beth Israel Cemetery
Bon-Pasteur Chapel	1868 (completed)	1975	Quebec City; 46°48′26.49″N 71°13′4.48″W	A rectangular five-storey stone-faced chapel with a gable roof that is part of the motherhouse of the Sisters of the Good Shepherd; it is prized for its interior designed by Charles Baillargé and is recognized as an outstanding example of religious architecture in Quebec	Exterior view of the Bon-Pasteur Chapel
Capitol Theatre / Quebec Auditorium	1903 (completed)	1986	Quebec City; 46°48′46.24″N 71°12′50.06″W	Remarkable Beaux Arts-style theatre with a bombé (rounded) facade; evocative of the exuberance of Belle Époque theatres	Exterior view of the Capitol Theatre / Quebec Auditorium
Cartier-Brébeuf	1535-6 (Cartier's wintering site)	1958	Quebec City; 46°49′31.01″N 71°14′22.7″W	A 6.8-hectare (17-acre) park located on the Saint-Charles River, near the former site of the Iroquoian village of Stadacona; commemorates the winter quarters of Jacques Cartier in 1535–1536, and the first residence of Jesuit missionaries in Quebec constructed in 1625-1626	Monument at Cartier-Brébeuf
Château Frontenac	1893 (first phase completed)	1981	Quebec City; 46°48′42.99″N 71°12′17.76″W	An imposing hotel located prominently on a cliff overlooking the Saint Lawrence River; the first of a series of Chateau-style hotels constructed by railway companies in Canada in the late 19th and early 20th centuries to encourage railway travel, and the prototype for the railway hotels that followed	Exterior view of Château Frontenac
Charlesbourg-Royal	1541 (established)	1923	Cap-Rouge; 46°44′53.35″N 71°20′29.72″W	The former site of two sixteenth-century forts established in 1541 by Jacques Cartier and abandoned in 1543; the first French colony in North America	Monumment of Fort Charlesbourg Royal
Fortifications of Quebec	1608-1871 (period of construction)	1948	Quebec City; 46°48′35.9″N 71°12′41.79″W	Quebec City's historic fortifications began with the city's founding by Samuel de Champlain and are located on a plateau overlooking the convergence of the Saint Lawrence and the Saint Charles Rivers; the city is the sole surviving example of a fortified city in North America	Part of the top of Kent gate, seen from above
Henry-Stuart House	1849 (completed)	1999	Quebec City; 46°48′8.99″N 71°13′26.09″W	A brick cottage set in a garden; a noted example of the "cottage orné" style in Quebec, evocative of the picturesque aesthetics favoured by British settlers	Exterior view of Henry-Stuart House
Holy Trinity Anglican Cathedral	1804 (completed)	1989	Quebec City; 46°48′46.08″N 71°12′23.76″W	A simple Palladian-style church, the construction of which introduced British classicism to Quebec City; the first purpose-built Anglican cathedral outside the British Isles	Exterior view of Holy Trinity Anglican Cathedral
Hôpital-Général de Québec Cemetery	1755 (established)	1999	Notre-Dame-des-Anges; 46°48′52.04″N 71°13′54.18″W	The small central part of the hospital cemetery, containing the graves of over 1000 French, British and aboriginal soldiers, many of whom died in the battles of the Plains of Abraham and Sainte-Foy, the two decisive battles between France and England for colonial supremacy of North America	Memorial in the Hôpital-Général de Québec Cemetery
Hôtel-Dieu de Québec	1637 (established)	1936	Quebec City; 46°48′54.76″N 71°12′38.26″W	The first permanent hospital established in North America north of Mexico	Exterior view of the hospital
La Fabrique	1871 (completed)	2011	Quebec City; 46°48′45″N 71°13′34″W	The former Dominion Corset Manufacturing building; representative of female industrial workers in Canada's textile industries	La Fabrique
Loyola House / National School Building	1823 (completed)	1989	Quebec City; 46°48′44.97″N 71°12′44.61″W	The oldest known Gothic Revival-style public building in Canada; erected in order to educate orphans, following the model of the National Society for Promoting Religious Education, the building housed a number of educational and charitable works; it was renamed Loyola House when it came to be owned by the Jesuits in 1904	Exterior view of the Loyola House / National School Building
Maillou House	1737 (first storey completed), 1767 (second storey added)	1958	Quebec City; 46°48′42.62″N 71°12′23.18″W	A two-storey stone house that served as the residence of a number of notable figures of the French Regime and British colonial administration; served as the meeting place for the military council that governed Quebec from 1760 to 1764 and ultimately became the headquarters of the local militia	Exterior view of the front facade of Maillou House
Manège militaire Voltigeurs de Québec	1887 (completed)	1986	Quebec City; 46°48′22.68″N 71°12′50.4″W	Designed by Quebec architect Eugène-Étienne Taché, it was the precursor of the Chateau-style in Canadian architecture; unique among armouries in Canada due to its design, it was heavily damaged by fire in 2008	Headquarters and Barracks of Les Voltigeurs de Québec, Quebec City Canada. In the foreground is the Regimental War Memorial.
Montmorency Park	1908 (park established)	1966	Quebec City; 46°48′49.05″N 71°12′14.64″W	An urban park that forms part of the Fortifications of Quebec NHS. A former building on the site housed the Parliament of the Province of Canada at various times between 1841 and 1866, hosted the Quebec Conference of 1864 that hammered out details of Confederation, and briefly accommodated the Legislative Assembly of Quebec	Statue of George-Étienne Cartier in Montmorency Park
Morrin College / Former Quebec Prison	1814 (completed)	1981	Quebec City; 46°48′45.74″N 71°12′37.77″W	A four-storey Palladian-style stone prison, converted to a college and home of the Literary and Historical Society of Quebec in the 19th century; the first prison in Canada to reflect the ideas of British reformer John Howard	Front facade of Morrin College
Mount Hermon Cemetery	1848 (established)	2007	Quebec City; 46°46′42.64″N 71°14′47.65″W	The first rural cemetery in Canada, established in Sillery, near Quebec City, created due to overcrowding at the old Protestant burying ground in the city; the funerary monuments and significance of many of the persons buried in the cemetery commemorate many aspects of the history of Quebec City, Quebec and Canada	Forsyth family grave marker in the Mount Hermon Cemetery
New Quebec Custom House	1860 (completed)	1972	Quebec City; 46°49′2.43″N 71°12′4.5″W	A neoclassical, stone custom house with Italianate detailing; its construction reflected Quebec City's exceptional growth as a commercial and political centre in the mid 19th century	Exterior view of New Quebec Custom House
Notre-Dame-de-Lorette Church	1722 (first church completed), 1865 (present church completed)	1981	Wendake; 46°51′22.32″N 71°21′16.92″W	A church at the centre of Old Wendake Historic District; the establishment of this Jesuit mission was a significant step in the migration of the Wendat people	Exterior view of Notre-Dame-de-Lorette Church
Notre-Dame Roman Catholic Cathedral	1647 (first completed)	1989	Quebec City; 46°49′2.43″N 71°12′4.5″W	The first parish church of the colony of New France; first built in 1647, the present cathedral is the product of many reconstructions, and it has been a significant influence on ecclesiastical architecture in Quebec	Exterior view of the Notre-Dame Roman Catholic Cathedral
Notre-Dame-des-Victoires Church	1688 (completed)	1988	Quebec City; 46°48′46.08″N 71°12′9.72″W	Built on the site of Samuel de Champlain’s 1608 Habitation, the first permanent French establishment in North America; a symbol of the French presence in North America	Exterior view of Notre-Dame-des-Victoires Church
Old Quebec Custom House	1832 (completed)	1990	Quebec City; 46°48′36.95″N 71°12′10.91″W	An excellent and rare surviving example of a neoclassical-style government building from the 1830s	Exterior view of Old Quebec Custom House
Old Wendake Historic District	1697 (established)	2000	Wendake; 46°51′41.3″N 71°21′25.6″W	A Wendat community established by those who survived the 17th-century dispersal of the inhabitants of Huronia	Streetscape in Wendake
Quebec Bridge	1917 (completed)	1995	Quebec City; 46°44′43.72″N 71°17′16.06″W	The world's longest clear-span cantilever bridge; the first major bridge to use the K truss, and the first bridge in North America to be constructed with nickel steel	View of Quebec Bridge
Quebec Citadel	1720 (established); 1832 (completed)	1946	Quebec City; 46°48′28.45″N 71°12′30.55″W	A fortress located on Cap Diamant which also forms part of the Fortifications of Quebec NHS; the secondary residence of the Governor General and the ceremonial home of the Royal 22^{e} Régiment, the most famous francophone organization of the Canadian Forces	View of the gate of the Quebec Citadel
Quebec City Hall	1896 (completed)	1984	Quebec City; 46°48′50.08″N 71°12′28.63″W	A town hall of the late-Victorian period, whose opulently eclectic exterior and richly decorated interiors make it one of the most stately municipal buildings in Canada	View of the Quebec City Hall
Quebec Court House	1887 (completed)	1981	Quebec City; 46°48′43.86″N 71°12′23.14″W	A Second Empire-style courthouse designed by Eugène-Étienne Taché; served as a courthouse for almost a century, and is a symbol of the judicial system in the province of Quebec	View of the Quebec Court House
Quebec Garrison Club	1816 (building completed), 1879 (club established)	1999	Quebec City; 46°48′34.32″N 71°12′38.99″W	First constructed as an administrative headquarters by the Royal Engineers, the building also forms part of the Fortifications of Quebec NHS; in 1879, officers of the Canadian Militia established the only military club in Canada that follows the British colonial tradition of social gatherings between military officers and influential civilians. Managing secretary during the 1960s was Hugh Hamilton Smith.	Exterior view of the Garrison Club from Côte de la Citadelle
Quebec Martello Towers	1812 (completed)	1990	Quebec City; 46°48′33.66″N 71°13′38.49″W	Three Martello towers at some distance from one another, also forming part of the Fortifications of Quebec NHS; the towers symbolize the importance of Quebec City and its fortifications to the defence of British North America in the early 19th century	Exterior view of one of the Martello Towers
Quebec Seminary	1663 (established)	1929	Quebec City; 46°48′52.75″N 71°12′20.52″W	One of the oldest educational institutions in Canada	Exterior view of the Quebec Seminary
Saint-Louis Forts and Châteaux	1620 (first construction on site)	2002	Quebec City; 46°48′44.64″N 71°12′15.84″W	Archaeological remains of 4 forts and 3 châteaux from both the French and British regimes; the seat of colonial executive authority for over 200 years, and the site of the official residences of 32 of the 40 Governors General from the colonial period	Exterior view of the ruins of the Saint-Louis forts and châteaux
Sewell House	1804 (completed)	1969	Quebec City; 46°48′35.1″N 71°12′36.76″W	The two-storey palladian residence of Chief Justice Jonathan Sewell; illustrative of the early 19th-century development of Quebec City's Upper Town	Exterior view of the Sewell House
Têtu House	1854 (completed)	1973	Quebec City; 46°48′36.21″N 71°12′23.81″W	A three-storey, stone townhouse designed in the Neoclassical style by Charles Baillairgé; excellent example of the urban townhouses built for wealthy Canadian merchants during the mid-19th century	Têtu House
Ursuline Monastery	1639 (established)	1972	Quebec City; 46°48′43.54″N 71°12′29.26″W	A complex of 17th, 18th and 19th century stone buildings; the old monastery is the largest and most imposing vestige of 17th-century Canadian architecture and the chapel altar, made in 1730, is a masterpiece of French Canadian wood sculpture	The interior of the Ursuline chapel in 1890

== See also ==
- History of Quebec City
