= Sons of Jacob Synagogue (Belleville, Ontario) =

Synagogue in Belleville, Ontario, Canada

- The synagogue in 2011

- Location in Ontario

Religion
- Affiliation: Conservative Judaism
- Ecclesiastical or organisational status: Synagogue
- Leadership: Norm Weddum (president)
- Status: Active

Location
- Location: 211 Victoria Avenue, Belleville, Ontario K8N 2C2
- Coordinates: 44.169622°N 77.370840°W

Architecture
- Architect: William Watson
- Type: Synagogue
- Established: 1905 (as a congregation)
- Completed: 1956
- Construction cost: C$70,000 (1956)

Website
- sonsofjacobsynagogue.ca

The Sons of Jacob Synagogue, also known as the Sons of Jacob Congregation (Hebrew: בני יעקב), is a Conservative synagogue at 211 Victoria Avenue in Belleville, Ontario. The only synagogue in Belleville, it serves Jews in the city, Trenton and Prince Edward County. The congregation traces its origins to a service held in 1905 at a rooming house for Jewish workers, and worshipped in a converted house on Pinnacle Street from 1929 until 1956, when it opened its present building in the city's east end. Orthodox in its early decades, it joined the Conservative movement in 1961. On September 20, 2026, the eve of Yom Kippur, a gunman attacked the synagogue as worshippers gathered for Kol Nidre and was stopped by two police officers in a shootout outside the building.

== History ==
=== Early community ===
At least four Jewish families lived in the Belleville area by 1891. In 1905 Moses and Tamara Tobe, who had moved to Belleville from Kingston, opened a kosher boarding house for Jewish workers in the Rolling Mill building at the foot of South George Street. The first Jewish religious service in Belleville was held there that year, and it led to the formation of the Sons of Jacob Congregation, at first an informal group of Orthodox Jews who met in one another's homes. An active minyan existed by 1911, when the census recorded six Jewish families in the city; by 1921 there were 61 Jewish residents. Vova Vechter, the community's spiritual leader before the First World War, was its first shochet and first Hebrew teacher. The congregation's first president was Abraham Albert, a Russian Jew who arrived in Belleville in 1914 and opened a furniture store in Trenton with his wife, Lilly.

After the First World War, the Albert, Gitelman and Merker families set up a minyan in Trenton, which obtained a Torah scroll and met on the second floor of the office of the Courier Advocate newspaper. As the community grew, the congregation rented the Orange Hall on Front Street in Belleville for Friday-evening and High Holiday services.

=== Pinnacle Street synagogue ===
Rabbi Gerstel, a teacher and shochet who served the community for some 14 years from the early 1920s, led the campaign for a synagogue. In 1927 the congregation bought a house at 122 Pinnacle Street, near the railway tracks in downtown Belleville, and by 1929 had converted it into a synagogue serving the Jews of Belleville, Trenton and Picton. Its first Torah scroll was presented by Julius Samuels, an early settler who ran a junkyard on Brock Street, and its dedication was a public event, with a parade of decorated automobiles and music by the Salvation Army band. A cheder met in the basement.

Belleville's Jewish population grew from 90 in 1931 to 103 in 1941 and as many as 130 by 1951. In a city-wide religious survey in 1942 the congregation had 98 members, and the community was bolstered by Jewish servicemen training with the Royal Canadian Air Force at Trenton. During the Second World War, the synagogue's women prepared meals for Jewish servicemen stationed at the base, and airmen were often invited to services. Rabbi Gedaliah Felder, later a leading rabbinical scholar in Toronto, served the congregation from 1943 to 1945. In the 1940s as many as 40 children attended its Sunday school. In 1947, on the initiative of its president, B. Mayer, the congregation bought land on Highway 2 between Belleville and Trenton for a cemetery, the Sons of Jacob Memorial Park; until then many members had been buried in Kingston or Toronto.

=== Victoria Avenue synagogue ===
In 1955 the congregation's 65 families decided that the old-fashioned Pinnacle Street building no longer met their needs, and chose a site in Belleville's east end, close to the public schools their children attended. The property at Victoria and Bleecker avenues cost $6,000, and the building, financed by a mortgage, cost just over $70,000. The Pinnacle Street synagogue was sold to the Canadian Legion for $16,000 and became a Legion hall. The new synagogue was dedicated on June 10, 1956, with Rabbi Moses Lewin officiating. For many years, Norm Albert and others ran a weekly bingo night at Tobe Country Gardens to help pay off the mortgage.

The move coincided with internal tension. A report to the executive in 1957 described difficulty in gathering a regular minyan and concern over a "shift from orthodoxy towards conservatism", and disagreement over the level of Orthodoxy the congregation should follow made it difficult to find and keep rabbis, most of whom served terms of two or three years. Lewin left for Glace Bay, Nova Scotia, in 1957 and was succeeded by Manfred Levison, a Holocaust survivor who came from Evanston, Illinois. On November 12, 1961, the congregation formally joined the Conservative movement through the United Synagogue of America. Rabbi Joseph Berglas, a Modern Orthodox rabbi born in Kraków who had served in Kingston and Australia, was called to the pulpit by 1963, and Walter Seligman, born in Hamburg, became spiritual leader in 1966.

Membership declined during the 1960s, and expenses sometimes exceeded income. The Hebrew school, which in the mid-1950s served 72 children from 55 families, had 16 pupils in the 1960s, five of them from Cobourg and one from Trenton. In 1969 the congregation commissioned new stained-glass windows for the sanctuary depicting the Twelve Tribes of Israel. A constitution adopted in 1972 described the congregation as following "conservative and/or orthodox" traditions.

=== Later years ===
Rabbi Solomon Kadoch was among the last rabbis to live in Belleville for an extended period, and the congregation has had no full-time rabbi since the late 1980s. It has since engaged visiting rabbis, often from Toronto, for the High Holidays and educational programs, in consultation with the Regional Jewish Communities of Ontario program, and Israeli teachers living in Toronto have commuted to teach its Hebrew school on Sundays. Women have been counted in the minyan since the late 1980s. As membership fell, the congregation adopted a more inclusive approach: many newer members favoured mixed seating and some services in English, and a longtime member attributed this flexibility partly to the high rate of intermarriage in the community. There were about 30 Jewish families in the Belleville area in 1988, and in 2002 the congregation estimated its regularly attending members at 25 to 30.

In June 2005, former residents led by Brenda (Black) Goldstein and Paul Yanover organized a reunion weekend in Belleville to mark the 50th anniversary of the Victoria Avenue synagogue, drawing participants mainly from Toronto, Kingston and Montreal and raising funds to preserve the synagogue and cemetery. In 2022, with fewer than 30 paying members, the congregation announced that it could not hold regular High Holiday services because it could not find anyone to lead them at a price it could afford. By 2025 it described itself as a small but growing egalitarian Conservative congregation undergoing a revival, drawing members from Trenton and Prince Edward County.

=== 2026 attack ===
At about 7 p.m. on September 20, 2026, as about 25 congregants gathered for Kol Nidre services, a gunman armed with a shotgun opened fire on a Belleville Police Service officer stationed outside the synagogue in an unmarked car. The officer, Constable Jeff Smith, was shot several times but engaged the attacker for nearly three minutes until a second officer, Constable Michael McCurdy, arrived; the gunman, Sean Ward, a 29-year-old former Canadian Armed Forces soldier from Quinte West, was shot and died in hospital the following night. Inside, the congregation's president, Norm Weddum, closed the sanctuary doors and told worshippers to get down; none was injured. Of about 30 shots fired, 23 pierced the sanctuary's stained-glass windows, and nearby homes and vehicles were also struck.

On September 24 Belleville's police chief, Murray Rodd, called the shooting a deliberate, hate-motivated attack on the Jewish community during one of its holiest observances. Police showed reporters video in which Ward is heard shouting "You are going to die for the Jews", and said he had carried several firearms, a large quantity of ammunition and gasoline and other combustible materials, giving him "the means, the motive and the mechanisms to cause a mass casualty". Ontario's solicitor general, Michael Kerzner, called the attack antisemitic.

The congregation returned to the building when police reopened the site on September 22, and held members-only Sabbath services the following Friday; it did not hold its own Sukkot observances that year. On October 1, antisemitic flyers were found posted on the synagogue and in the surrounding neighbourhood; B'nai Brith Canada said they appeared to be associated with the Goyim Defense League. By September 30, an online fundraiser to repair the synagogue and install security cameras, an alarm system and bulletproof film on its windows had raised $94,500, and a separate fund established by national Jewish organizations was allocating money to the synagogue's security.

== Architecture ==
The Victoria Avenue synagogue, designed by the architect William Watson, stands in a tree-lined residential neighbourhood at the corner of Bleecker Avenue. The building comprises a sanctuary and administrative offices, together with classrooms and a large multi-purpose hall for community events. The sanctuary's stained-glass wall was originally a geometric pattern of coloured glass in thirteen hexagonal panels. Between 1969 and 1973 these were replaced with glass representing the Twelve Tribes of Israel around a central Star of David, most of it paid for by members as memorials. The panels are set in lead, and after the 2026 attack Weddum said their repair would require a craftsman.

== Cemetery ==
The congregation's cemetery, the Sons of Jacob Memorial Park, lies on the north side of Highway 2 about halfway between Belleville and Trenton, and serves both communities. A plot guide from about 1960 shows 224 plots in five rows. In 1957 the congregation established a trust fund for its upkeep.

== Community life ==
The synagogue welcomes Jews of all backgrounds and interfaith families. It holds Friday-evening services and monthly Sabbath-morning services led by guest leaders, often from Toronto, as well as lectures and holiday celebrations. It took part in the city's multi-faith Festival of Faith in January 2025.
