= Re Drummond Wren =

Decision by the Ontario High Court

Re Drummond Wren [1945] O.R. 778 (Ont. H.C.) is a decision by the Ontario High Court, presided by Justice Mackay, regarding the validity of a racially motivated restrictive covenant. The Workers' Educational Association purchased a lot in East York. The covenant prohibited the land from being sold to "Jews, or persons of objectionable nationality". Drummond Wren brought forward an action to have the restrictive covenant declared invalid. Wren was the general secretary of the Workers' Educational Association. He was represented by John Cartwright and Irving Himel. J. M. Bennett appeared as legal counsel for the Canadian Jewish Congress, assisted by Bora Laskin, Jacob Finkelman, and Charles Dubin.

== Ruling ==
Justice Mackay found the covenant to be invalid as a violation of public policy. He cited the recent signing of the United Nations Charter by the United Nations, to which Canada was a signatory, as a determining factor for public policy. He went on to state:

"...It appears to me to be a moral duty, at least, to lend aid to all forces of cohesion, and similarly to repel all fissiparous tendencies which would imperil national unity..."

Justice Mackay further stated: "...nothing could be more calculated to create or deepen divisions between existing religious and ethnic groups in the Province, or in this Country, than the sanction of a method of land transfer which would permit the segregation areas, or conversely, would exclude particular groups from particular business or residential areas."

Justice Mackay confirmed that the covenant was an improper restraint on alienation. Moreover, the wording in the covenant was uncertain, as the phrase "persons of objectionable nationality" lacked legal meaning.

== Aftermath ==
The Michigan Supreme Court in 1947 cited Drummond Wren in a decision finding that a property covenant against African Americans was invalid.

Shortly after the case was considered, but not followed, by Justice Schroeder in Noble v. Alley.

In 1979, Justice Bertha Wilson, then at the Ontario Court of Appeal, cited Drummond Wren in the Bhadauria case. Justice Wilson recognized a tort of discrimination. In 1981, the Supreme Court of Canada overturned Justice Wilson's ruling, finding instead no tort of discrimination in Canadian law.
