= John Keiller MacKay =

Canadian soldier, lawyer, and jurist (1888-1970)

Lieutenant-Colonel the Honourable J. Keiller MacKay OC DSO VD KC
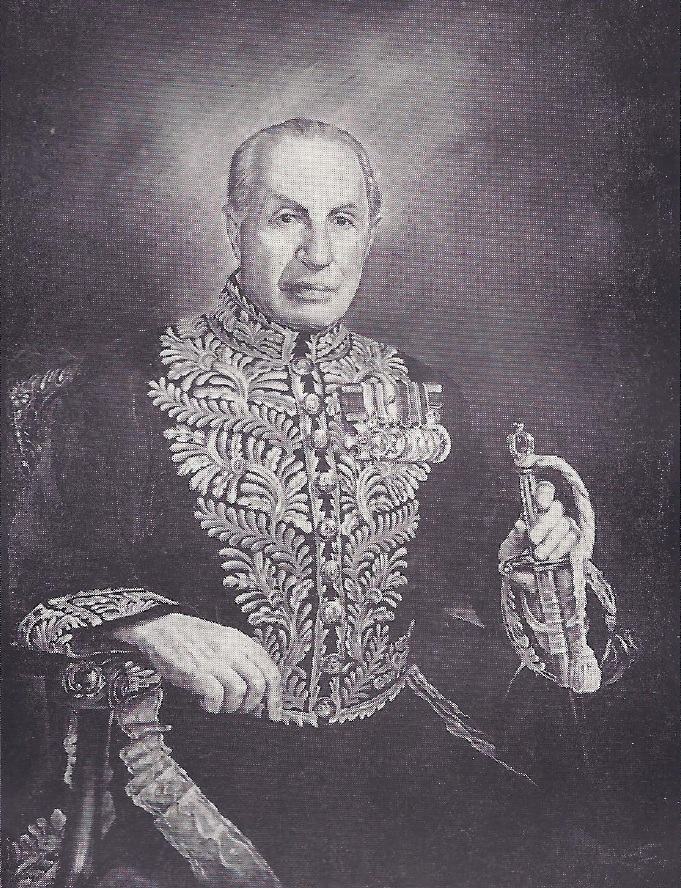
- Official portrait, 1958

19th Lieutenant Governor of Ontario
- In office December 30, 1957 – May 1, 1963
- Monarch: Elizabeth II
- Governors General: Vincent Massey; Georges Vanier
- Premier: Leslie Frost; John Robarts
- Preceded by: Louis Orville Breithaupt
- Succeeded by: William Earl Rowe

Personal details
- Born: John Keiller MacKay; July 11, 1888 Plainfield, Nova Scotia, Canada
- Died: June 12, 1970 (aged 81) Toronto, Ontario, Canada
- Resting place: Mt. Pleasant Cemetery
- Military career
- Allegiance: Canada
- Rank: Lieutenant-Colonel
- Commands: 6th Brigade, Canadian Field Artillery
- Conflicts: Battle of the Somme; Battle of Vimy Ridge

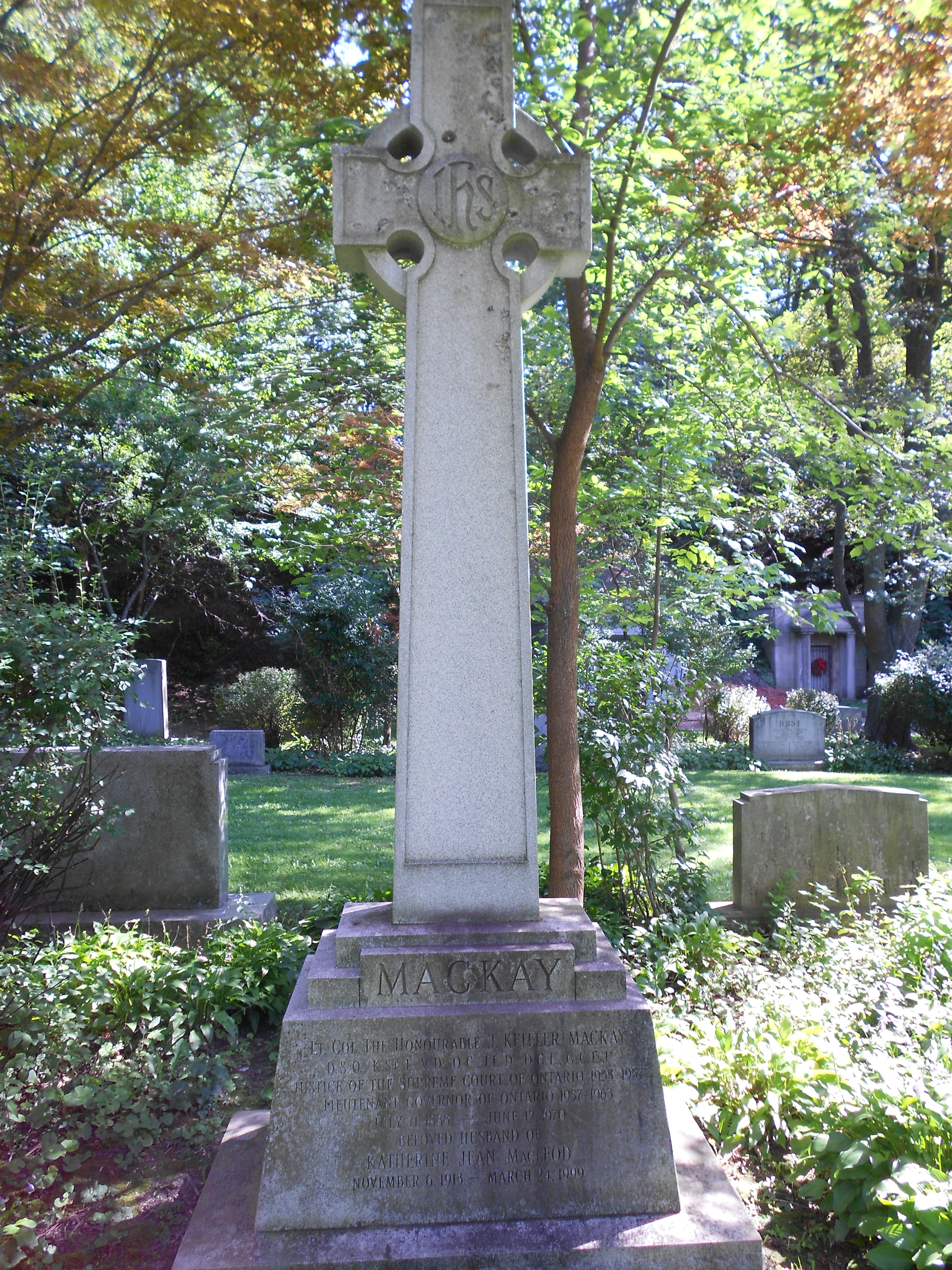
MacKay's monument at Mount Pleasant Cemetery in Toronto

Lieutenant-Colonel John Keiller MacKay OC DSO VD KC (July 11, 1888 – June 12, 1970) was a Canadian soldier, lawyer and jurist. MacKay served as the 19th lieutenant governor of Ontario from 1957 to 1963.

== Early life and education ==
John Keiller MacKay was born on July 11, 1888, in the village of Plainfield in Pictou County, Nova Scotia, the son of John Duncan and Bessie (Murray) MacKay. He was educated at the Pictou Academy, the Royal Military College (1909), Saint Francis Xavier University (BA 1912) and Dalhousie University (LL.B. 1922).

== Career ==
=== Military ===
During World War I, he served in, and later commanded, 6th Brigade, Canadian Field Artillery (Non-Permanent Active Militia in the Canadian Army). He achieved the rank of Lieutenant-Colonel and was mentioned in dispatches three times and wounded twice. MacKay won the Distinguished Service Order in 1916 at the Battle of the Somme and in 1918 was seriously wounded at Arras. He left the military after the war but was involved in the formation of the Royal Canadian Legion in 1925 and was its first National Vice-Chairman. He was a freemason and was initiated in 1925 to Ionic Lodge, #25 G.R.C.

=== Law and politics ===
Known as J. Keiller MacKay, he was called to the Nova Scotia bar in 1922 and the Ontario bar in 1923. He was a senior partner in the law firm of MacKay, Matheson & Martin in Toronto, and he became a specialist in criminal law. He was appointed a King's Counsel in 1933. He was appointed to Ontario's High Court of Justice (now the Ontario Superior Court of Justice) in 1935.

As a judge on the High Court, MacKay wrote the judgment in Re Drummond Wren, a landmark 1945 decision overturning an anti-Semitic restrictive covenant in Toronto. A local labour organization, the Workers' Education Association (WEA), had purchased a property on O'Connor Drive, east of Broadview Avenue in Toronto, for the purpose of building a model "workingman's home", offered as a potential solution to the city's shortage of affordable housing. After buying the property, the WEA discovered there was a restrictive covenant on the deed preventing the land from being sold to "Jews or persons of objectionable nationality". The WEA and the Canadian Jewish Congress launched a court action to strike down the restriction and in his decision, issued on October 31, 1945, Mackay declared the covenant illegal and "injurious to the public good". Five years later, in March 1950, the Legislative Assembly of Ontario unanimously adopted legislation banning restrictive covenants, with Ontario Premier Leslie Frost declaring "There is no place in Ontario's way of life for restrictive covenants".

MacKay was appointed to the Court of Appeal for Ontario in 1950 and remained on the court until 1957, when he was named the lieutenant governor of Ontario. He served as lieutenant governor until 1963, and he opened the lieutenant governor's New Year's Levee to the general public for the first time.

In 1964, he was a founder of the Canadian Civil Liberties Association, serving as honorary president.

In 1967, he was made an Officer of the Order of Canada. He was also a Knight of Grace of the Venerable Order of St. John and was responsible for bringing the Order of Saint Lazarus to Canada in 1962.

== Personal life ==
He was married to Katherine "Kay" Jean MacLeod and had three sons. He died in Toronto on June 12, 1970, and is buried in Mount Pleasant Cemetery, Toronto (section Q-154).

Government offices
Preceded by Louis Orville Breithaupt	Lieutenant Governor of Ontario; 1957–1963	Succeeded by William Earl Rowe
