= Jacob Finkelman =

Canadian legal scholar and jurist

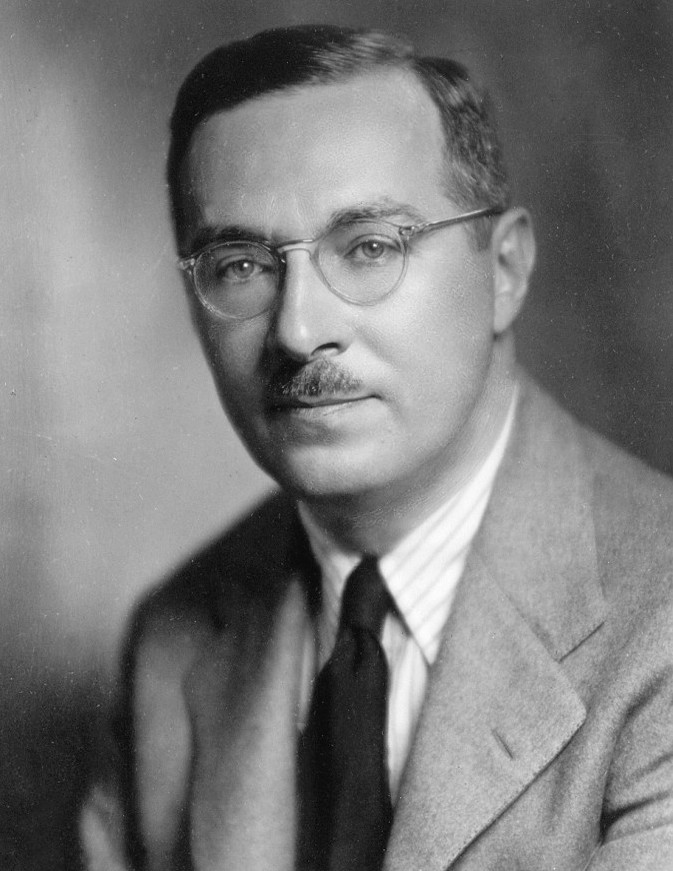
Finkelman in the 1940s

Jacob Finkelman (January 17, 1907 – December 21, 2003) QC OC was a Canadian legal scholar and jurist. He was an authority on Canadian labour law.

== Early life and education ==
Jacob Finkelman was born in Poltava on January 17, 1907. He came to Canada with his parents eight months after he was born and settled in Hamilton, Ontario. He received a BA in 1926, an MA in 1932, and an LLB in 1933, all from the University of Toronto.

== Career ==
Finkelman became a lecturer at the University of Toronto Faculty of Law in 1930. William Paul McClure Kennedy, then dean of the faculty, spoke in favour of the appointment to Robert Falconer, the university's president. When he was named an assistant professor in 1934, Finkelman was the first Jew to become a full-time professor at the university. He was an assistant professor at the faculty from 1934 to 1939, an associate professor from 1939 to 1944, and a full professor from 1944 to 1954.

Finkelman presided over his first labour arbitration in 1937, when he was asked by a garment union to adjudicate a dispute. In 1944, Finkelman was named the first chair of the Ontario Labour Relations Board. He chaired the board until 1947, and then again from 1953 to 1967. In 1967, Prime Minister Lester B. Pearson named Finkelman the first chair of the Public Service Staff Relations Board (now the Federal Public Sector Labour Relations and Employment Board), a federal tribunal.

Finkelman was named a King's Counsel in 1946. He was appointed an officer of the Order of Canada in 1976 and received an honorary LLD from York University in 1977.

== Death ==
Finklelman died on December 21, 2003, in Ottawa.

== Sources ==
- Friedland, Martin (September 7, 2020). Searching for W.P.M. Kennedy: The Biography of an Enigma. University of Toronto Press. doi:10.3138/9781487533915. ISBN 978-1-4875-3391-5. S2CID 226740332.
- Friedland, Martin (2013). The University of Toronto: A History (2nd ed.). University of Toronto Press. ISBN 978-1-4426-1536-6. OCLC 871355685.
- Kaplan, William; Goldenberg, Shirley; Martin, W. Steward (1991). "A Profile of Jacob Finkelman, O.C., Q.C., LL.D". In Kaplan, William; Sack, Jeffrey; Gunderson, Morley (eds.). Labour Arbitration Yearbook. Vol. 1. Toronto: Butterworths; Lancaster House. pp. xi–xvi. ISBN 9780409898675. OCLC 1150045988.
