= Noble v Alley =

- Supreme Court of Canada

Hearing: June 13, 16, 1950 Judgment: November 20, 1950
- Full case name: Noble and Wolf v Alley et al.
- Citations: [1951] SCR 64, 1950 CanLII 13 (SCC)
- Prior history: APPEAL from Noble et al. v. Alley, 1949 CanLII 13, [1949] OR 503 (9 June 1949), Court of Appeal (Ontario, Canada), affirming Re Noble and Wolf, 1948 CanLII 66, [1948] OR 579 (11 June 1948), Superior Court of Justice (Ontario, Canada).
- Ruling: Appeal allowed.

Court membership
- Chief Justice: Thibaudeau Rinfret; Puisne Justices: Patrick Kerwin, Robert Taschereau, Ivan Rand, Roy Kellock, James Wilfred Estey, Charles Holland Locke, John Robert Cartwright, Gerald Fauteux

Reasons given
- Plurality: Rand J., joined by Kellock and Fauteux JJ.
- Concurrence: Kerwin J., joined by Taschereau J.
- Concurrence: Estey J.
- Dissent: Locke J.
- Rinfret C.J. and Cartwright J. took no part in the consideration or decision of the case.

Noble and Wolf v Alley [1951] S.C.R. 64 is a famous Supreme Court of Canada decision where the Court struck down a restrictive covenant that restricted ownership of a section of land to "persons of the white or Caucasian race".

== Case history ==
In 1933, Annie Noble had purchased a lot for a cottage in the Beach O' Pines area on Lake Huron. She decided in 1948 to sell the lot to Bernard Wolf. However, it was noticed that the original deed contained the following clause:

"(f) The lands and premises herein described shall never be sold, assigned, transferred, leased, rented or in any manner whatsoever alienated to, and shall never be occupied or used in any manner whatsoever by any person of the Jewish, Hebrew, Semitic, Negro or coloured race or blood, it being the intention and purpose of the Grantor, to restrict the ownership, use, occupation and enjoyment of the said recreational development, including the lands and premises herein described, to persons of the white or Caucasian race not excluded by this clause."

Though Wolf was Jewish, Noble still wanted to sell him the land, and so they applied to the court to have the covenant nullified, facing opposition from the "Pines" community.

Noble and Wolf cited a 1945 decision in Re Drummond Wren, where the Ontario Court struck down a discriminatory covenant. However, at trial and on appeal the courts upheld the restriction.

The Supreme Court, in a six to one ruling, held that the covenant was invalid. They agreed with the lower court's dismissal of Drummond Wren and instead looked at the law of restrictive covenants and held that the language used in the restriction on alienation was too uncertain. As Rand J explained in his judgment, such covenants would need to comply with the rule expressed in Tulk v Moxhay, in that they "should touch or concern the land as contradistinguished from a collateral effect". As the covenant in this case was "directed not to the land or to some mode of its use, but to transfer by act of the purchaser", it had to fail in that it was "impossible to set such limits to the lines of race or blood as would enable a court to say in all cases whether a proposed purchaser is or is not within the ban".

== Impact ==
While the case went through the courts, the Legislature of Ontario passed an act that declared such restrictive covenants to be "void and of no effect," but it only applied to ones created on or after March 24, 1950, its date of Royal assent.

While the covenants in the deeds constituting the community at Beach O' Pines were held to be ineffective, others created before the amendment (as long as they complied with Tulk v Moxhay) were still considered to be valid, as the Ontario Court of Appeal stated that they did not offend public policy.

== See also ==
Shelley v. Kraemer, an analogous case (but broader in its effect) decided by the United States Supreme Court in 1948.
