= Old Ausable Channel =

Waterway in Lambton County, Ontario

Coordinates: 43°16′03″N 81°48′46″W

The Old Ausable Channel is a self-contained waterway in Lambton County, Ontario, Canada that runs through Pinery Provincial Park and the community of Grand Bend. It is a 14 kilometre long river channel that was isolated from the Ausable River by the digging of canals for drainage in the late nineteenth century. Part of Pinery Provincial Park's rare oak savanna, the channel is an important part of the region's ecosystem.

== History ==
The Ausable River source is a moraine near Staffa, Ontario and it empties into Lake Huron at Port Franks. Starting in the 1870s, the Canada Company engaged in large-scale drainage projects within its watershed and adjacent lakes to prepare the land for vegetable agriculture. In 1875-1876, a drainage canal called "The Cut" was dug, draining the Thedford Marsh and Lake Burwell, diverting the course of the Ausable. In 1892, a second 400 yard trench was created to outlet Parkhill Creek (a tributary of the Ausable) into Lake Huron at Grand Bend, Ontario to provide Grand Bend with a harbour. This resulted in the isolation of a 14 kilometre channel from the course of the river, which became known as the Old Ausable Channel. As the new diversion carried pollutants and agricultural run-off into Lake Huron, bypassing the channel, it remained a mostly untouched section of natural environment while the surrounding areas were increasingly impacted by human industrialization.

Isolated from the river, the Old Ausable Channel was fed only by groundwater from local sand dunes, precipitation, and small amounts of surface runoff. By 1936 it was reduced to only a small creek at its deepest parts. Both banks were subsequently colonized by terrestrial vegetation.

In 1948, serious flooding impacted Port Franks and the surrounding area. The Ausable River Conservation Authority extended the original 1870s cut in 1952, resulting in a channel only 8 kilometres in length. A further 400 hectares of land in the Thedford Marsh, including Lake Smith, were drained and converted into agricultural land.

Pinery Provincial Park was created in 1957 to preserve unique natural landscapes including the dunes while also providing a recreational area for nearby communities. During the creation of the park, it was decided to use the Old Ausable Channel for boating and fishing. To accomplish this, a dam was built in 1962, about 9 kilometres downstream from Grand Bend. The water impounded by the dam re-filled the channel to its original width, flooding the terrestrial plants that had colonized the banks and returning it to usable levels. Four drainage culverts under access roads maintain the water level in the 4 km long stretch on the Grand Bend side of the channel.

The sections in Grand Bend have residential homes built along the banks, resulting in pollutants entering the channel.

== Ecology ==
Groundwater recharge in the channel is prominent in the southern sections, away from Grand Bend. Minimal flow has resulted in a build-up of nutrients and a subsequent growth of aquatic plants and algae. Upstream of the dam the channel is slow flowing and minimally turbid, while downstream of the dam there is a backwash effect from the nearby cut. This channel is in its entirety 14 kilometres in length, 0.5-2.5 metres deep and 20-80 metres wide. Flow is minimal the spring and nearly non-existent by July. Following the return of pre-cut water levels via the dam, the channel remains an example of the landscape prior to alterations by settlers of the land.

Due to the minimal flow, the channel is slowly converting to a more pond-like ecosystem, and may eventually become less aquatic and more terrestrial.

The Old Ausable Channel is an important area for biodiversity. Three species of at-risk fishes (pugnose shiner, lake chubsucker and grass pickerel) live in the channel, and the surrounding oak savanna is the largest in Ontario. Eastern wood-pewee, wood thrush, ovenbird, and scarlet tanager breed along the riverside trail and yellow-throated vireo breeds along the banks of the channel itself. Butterflies include Delaware skipper, Leonard's skipper, and Olympia marble.

== See also ==
- Au Sable River
- List of parks and protected areas in Ontario
- List of rivers of Ontario
- Conservation Authorities Act
- Beach O' Pines
