= Ontario Highway 82 =

Former Ontario provincial highway

King's Highway 82

Route information
- Maintained by the Ministry of Transportation
- Length: 11.3 km (7.0 mi)
- Existed: 1938–April 1, 1982

Major junctions
- South end: Highway 7 near Thedford
- North end: Highway 21 in Port Franks

Location
- Country: Canada
- Province: Ontario
- Towns: Thedford, Northville, Port Franks

Highway system
- Ontario provincial highways; Current; Former; 400-series
← Highway 81	→ Highway 83

King's Highway 82, also known as Highway 82, was a provincially maintained highway in the Canadian province of Ontario. The short highway followed the original routing of Highway 21 through Thedford until it was rerouted via Forest c. 1937. The route remained almost unchanged throughout its existence; it was renumbered as a northerly extension of Highway 79, effective March 31st, 1982, The entire length of Highway 79 itself was then decommissioned including the portion following the former route of Highway 83 on April 1st, 1997, and transferred to Lambton County. It was subsequently redesignated as Lambton County Road 79

== Route description ==
Highway 82 began at an intersection with Highway 7 and progressed north to Highway 21 near Port Franks. At its midpoint, the route passed through Thedford, where it is named Main Street.

The former route begins travelling northwards but immediately begins curving gently to the west, splitting from the old Port Franks Road and entering Thedford. It briefly curves southwest through the commercial strip of the town, an orientation influenced by the former railway. At King Street, the route turns north and crosses the former track bed. As it exits the town, the route curves west onto Ravenswood Line and enters farmland. It curves north onto Northville Road and travels straight for several kilometres, eventually crossing the old Port Franks Road just south of Highway 21, where the route ends.

== History ==
It is unclear exactly when Highway 82 was first numbered. Up until at least 1936, Highway 21 followed the route that would become Highway 82. On August 19, 1936, the Department of Highways (DHO) assumed 18.2 kilometres (11.3 mi) of roadway between Forest and Port Franks from Bosanquet Township. South of Forest, this roadway was until then Highway 21A However, it is not apparent whether it was routed via Thedford or Forest between 1936 and 1938. On the official DHO road map dated January 1, 1938, Highway 21 travels through Forest and Highway 82 is marked for the first time.

Although the road was gravel surfaced when it was given its new number, it was paved between in stages through the 1940s. Between 1940 and 1942, the section of the route from Highway 7 through Thedford was paved. The remainder was paved by 1949.

Highway 82 would remain in the provincial highway network until the early 1980s, when another renumbering took place. Highway 79, which until then ended at Highway 22, was extended north concurrently with Highway 7 through Arkona. Highway 82 was renumbered as a northerly extension of Highway 79 by April 1st, 1982, retiring the designation,

== Major intersections ==
The following table lists the major junctions along Highway 82, as noted by the Ministry of Transportation of Ontario. The entire route is located in Lambton County.

Location	km	mi	Destinations	Notes
Lambton Shores	0.0	0.0	County Road 7 (Elginfield Road) – Sarnia, London	Formerly Highway 7
Thedford	3.2	2.0	Main Street / Gordon Road	
Port Franks	11.3	7.0	Highway 21	
1.000 mi = 1.609 km; 1.000 km = 0.621 mi
