= Beach O' Pines =

Private gated community in Ontario, Canada

Coordinates: 43.294731°N 81.78317°W

Beach O' Pines is a private gated community located on the shores of Lake Huron in Lambton County, Ontario, Canada. It is located immediately outside of the community of Grand Bend, Ontario, and is bordered to the northwest by Lake Huron, the southwest by the Pinery Provincial Park, the northeast by the subdivision of Southcott Pines, and the southeast by the Old Ausable Channel, Highway #21, and the subdivision of Huron Woods.

== Formation ==
In 1929, Frank Salter (a well-known developer from Detroit, Michigan) and several friends found themselves in Grand Bend taking shelter from a storm. While there, he explored the surrounding countryside and identified a 5,000 acres (2,000 ha) parcel that could be developed into a luxury resort. He formed the Frank S. Salter Company Limited (headquartered in Windsor, Ontario), which bought the land from the Canada Company.

Because of the Great Depression, the company scaled back its original plans, and part of the land was subdivided into 35 parcels that were offered for sale together with a right of way over land held by Beach O'Pines Club Limited, for the purpose of ingress and egress from and to Highway 21 and the shore of Lake Huron. The purchasers established the Beach O'Pines Protective Association to improve the property and safeguard their interests.

== Antisemitism and racism ==
=== Noble v Alley ===
Restrictive covenants were inserted by the developer in the deeds of transfer that limited ownership to the properties inside Beach O' Pines based upon ethnic origin until August 1962. In April 1948, Bernard Wolf attempted to buy a cottage in the community. A title search of the property by his lawyer revealed the restrictive covenant in the original property deed, that provided that the land could never be sold, used, occupied, or rented "by any person of the Jewish, Hebrew, Semitic, Negro or coloured race or blood", and he applied to the courts to have it removed.

The application was dismissed by Justice Schroeder, who held that the covenant was valid and enforceable. The covenant was upheld by the Ontario Court of Appeal. However, it was finally overturned by the Supreme Court of Canada in a vote of six to one in Noble v Alley, holding that the clause was void for uncertainty: the precise meaning of its stipulations about "race or blood" could not be determined.

On July 11, 2021, the Beach O' Pines Association membership unanimously approved a Statement of Diversity & Inclusion:

Beach O Pines Association and its members are committed to cultivating and preserving a culture of inclusion and connectedness in this special community. We are able to prosper and learn better together with a diverse membership. We believe that the collective sum of the individual differences, life experiences, knowledge, innovation, self-expression, and talents that our members bring to Beach O' Pines strengthens our community. We embrace all of the uniqueness of our members and their families, including their education, opinions, culture, ethnicity, race, sex, gender identity and expression, nation of origin, age, spoken language, veteran's status, colour, religious beliefs, disability, and sexual orientation.

== Land disputes ==
When the Beach O' Pines development was originally undertaken, a 5 acres (2.0 ha) parcel was withheld from the original conveyance. The original holding company was dissolved in 1963, and it was determined in 2011 that that land escheated to the Crown. It was conveyed to the Municipality of Lambton Shores that year for use as a greenspace. There have also been issues with the municipality relating to the status of several road allowances and a towpath along the Old Ausable River Channel, that are in the process of being resolved.
