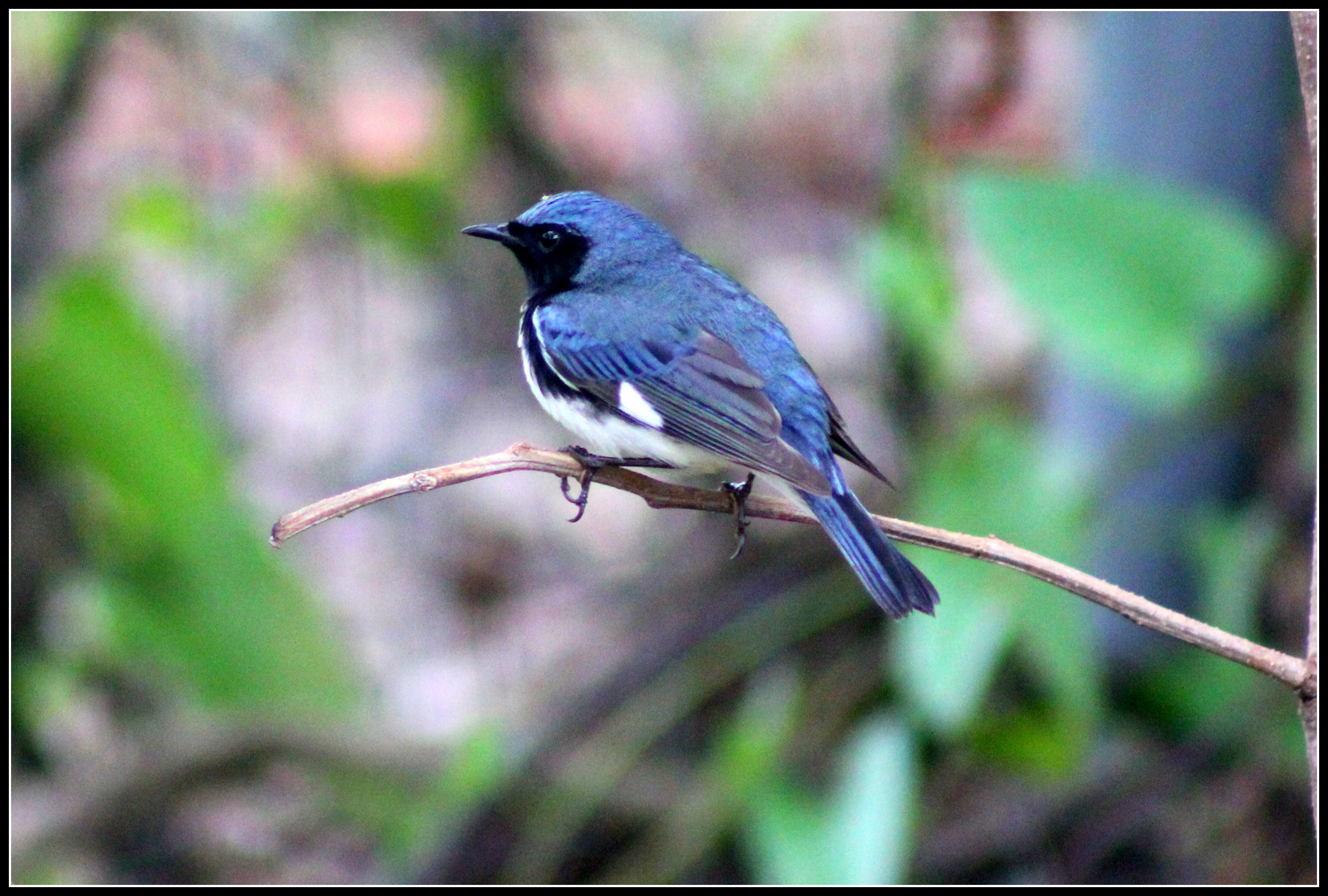
- Male
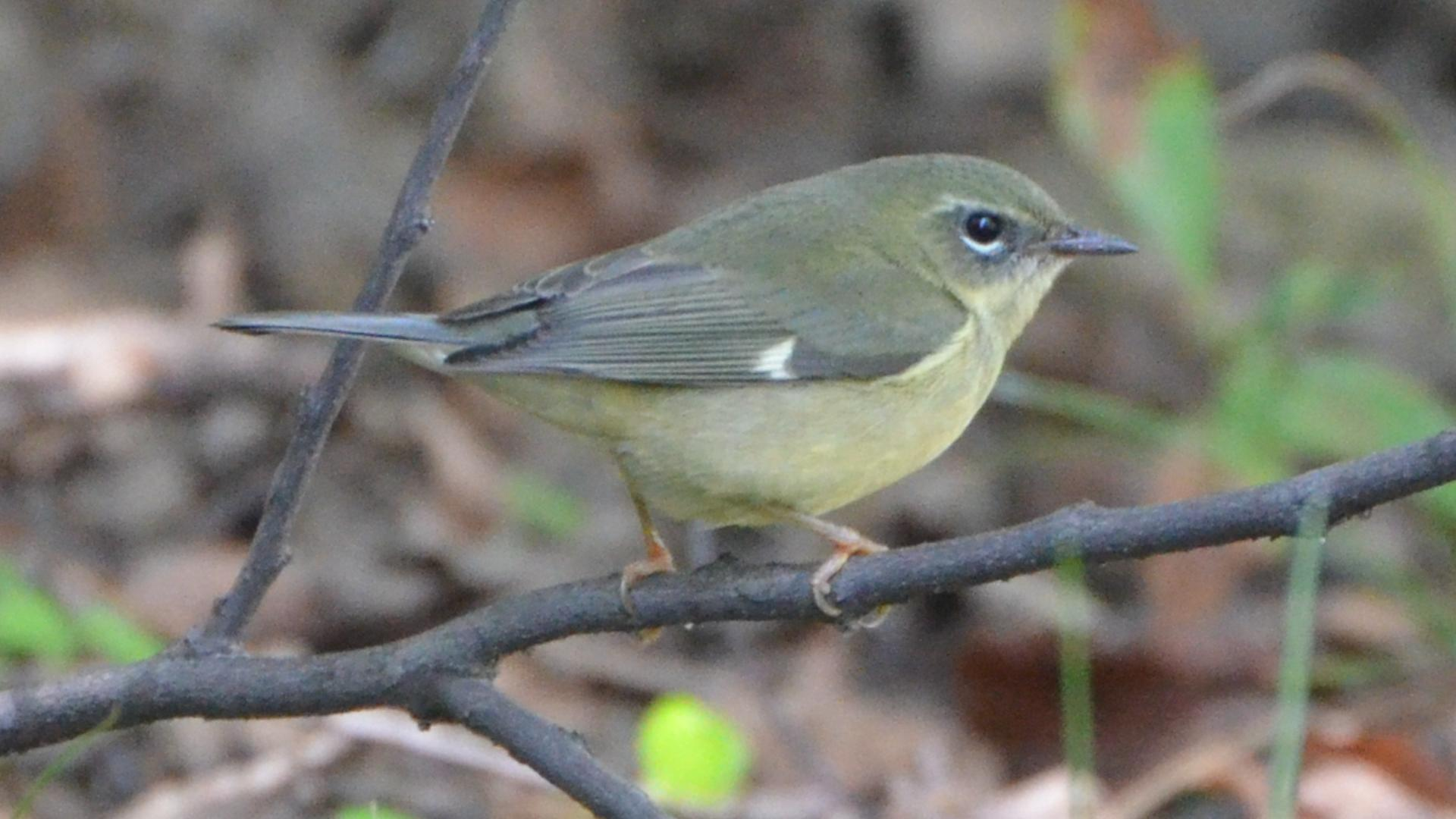
- Female

Conservation status
- Least Concern (IUCN 3.1)

Scientific classification
- Kingdom: Animalia
- Phylum: Chordata
- Class: Aves
- Order: Passeriformes
- Family: Parulidae
- Genus: Setophaga
- Species: S. caerulescens

Binomial name
- Setophaga caerulescens (Gmelin, 1789)
- Range of S. caerulescens Breeding range Wintering range

Synonyms
- Dendroica caerulescens

= Black-throated blue warbler =

Species of bird

The black-throated blue warbler (Setophaga caerulescens) is a small passerine bird of the New World warbler family. Its breeding ranges are located in the interior of deciduous and mixed coniferous forests in eastern North America. Over the cooler months, it migrates to islands in the Caribbean and Central America. It is very rarely found in western Europe, where it is considered to be a non-indigenous species. The black-throated blue warbler is sexually dimorphic; the adult male has a black face and cheeks, deep blue upperparts and white underparts, while the adult female is olive-brown above and light yellow below.

Predominantly insectivorous, the black-throated blue warbler supplements its diet with berries and seeds in winter. It builds its nests in thick shrubs and the closeness of its nesting sites to the ground make it a favored species for the study of warbler behavior in the wild. The black-throated blue warbler defends its territory against other birds of the same species for both nesting and winter habitats. As the black-throated blue warbler requires large, unbroken forest areas for nesting, its numbers are declining.

== Taxonomy ==
The black-throated blue warbler was formally described in 1789 by the German naturalist Johann Friedrich Gmelin in his revised and expanded edition of Carl Linnaeus's Systema Naturae. He placed it in the genus Motacilla and coined the binomial name Motacilla caerulescens. He specified the type locality as Santo Domingo in the Dominican Republic. The specific epithet caerulescens is Latin meaning "bluish". Gmelin based his account on the "La fauvette bleuâtre de Saint-Dominigue" that had been described in 1778 by the French polymath Comte de Buffon in his book Histoire Naturelle des Oiseaux. The black-throated blue warbler is now placed in the genus Setophaga that was introduced by the English naturalist William Swainson in 1827. The genus name Setophaga combines the Ancient Greek σης/sēs, σητος/sētos meaning "moth" with -φαγος/-phagos meaning "-eating".

Two subspecies are recognised:

- S. c. caerulescens (Gmelin, JF, 1789) – south, southeast Canada and northeast USA
- S. c. cairnsi (Coues, 1897) – central east USA

The black-throated blue warbler is one of the New World warblers or wood-warblers in the family Parulidae. This species was originally placed under the genus Dendroica. It was recently adjusted to be a member of genus Setophaga along with all other members of the genus Dendroica, based on the findings from a recent phylogenetic analysis of mitochondrial DNA and nuclear DNA in 2010. The old genus Dendroica was then deleted. Within the genus, it appears to have no particularly close relatives.

The species breeds in North America and winters in the Caribbean. Some studies have observed significant differences in terms of migratory behavior and plumage color between northern and southern populations within the breeding range. The northern population mainly winters in the western Caribbean (Cuba and Jamaica) while the southern population usually spends the winter on eastern islands (Hispaniola and Puerto Rico). Moreover, males in the southern population have darker plumage than those in the northern population. These differences have led biologists to consider them as separate subspecies. However, a recent study in the United States reveals no significant genetic differentiation between northern (samples from Michigan, New Hampshire and New York states) and southern populations (sample from North Carolina). The study results actually show a recent population expansion from a single glacial refugium, therefore the current populations are homogeneous in terms of genetics. The differentiation that is observed between the northern and southern populations should have occurred quite recently.

== Description ==
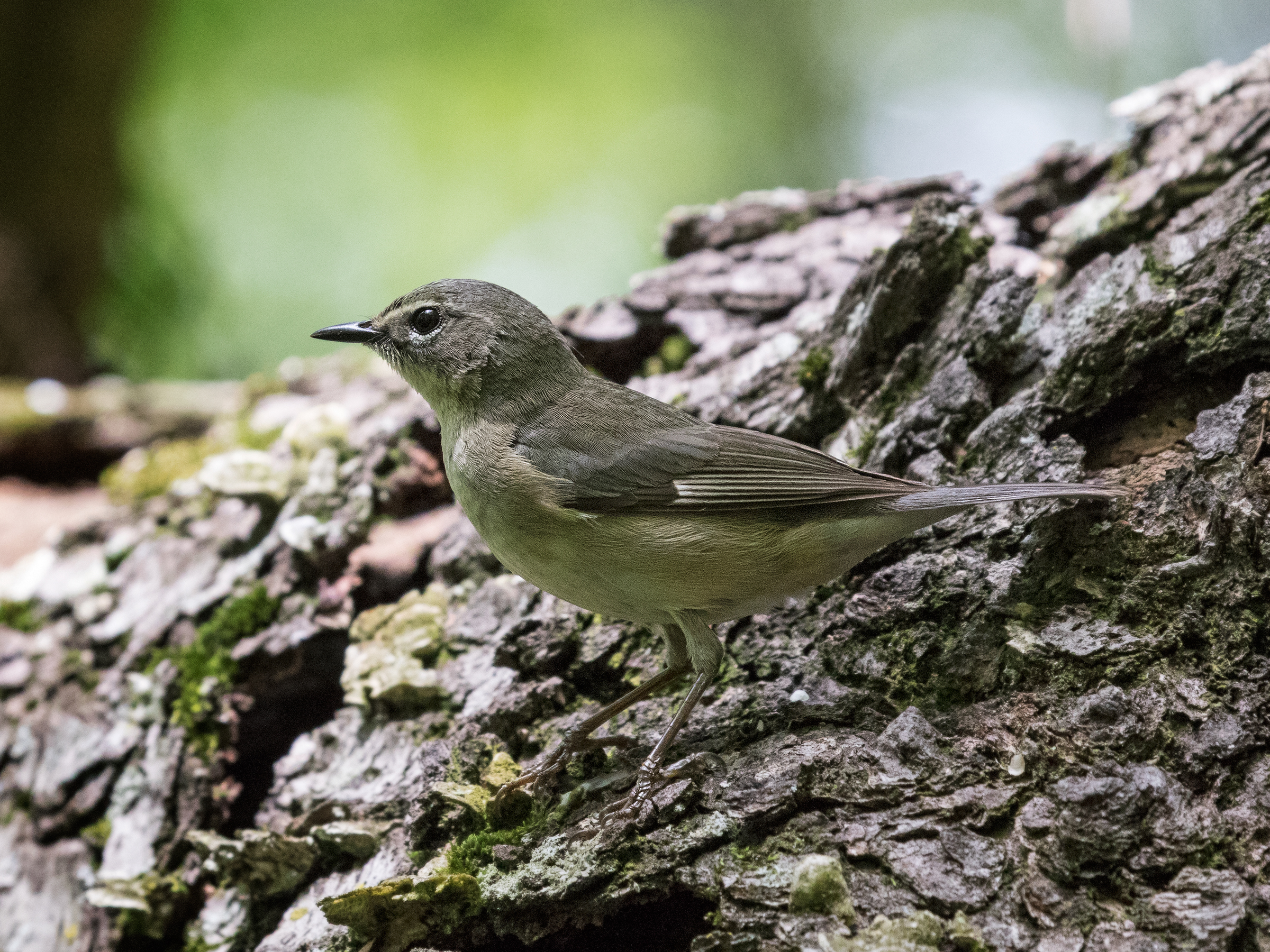
Female foraging for termites at the John Heinz National Wildlife Refuge

The black-throated blue warbler measures 13 cm (5.1 in) in length and weighs 8.4–12.4 g (0.30–0.44 oz). Wingspan ranges from 7.5–7.9 in (19–20 cm). This is a strongly sexually dimorphic bird. The adult male has white underparts with a black throat, face and flanks. The upperparts are deep blue. The immature male is similar, but with greener upperparts. The female has olive-brown upperparts and light yellow underparts with darker wings and tail, gray crown and brown patches on the cheek. Both sexes have a thin pointed bill and small white wing patches which are not always visible. Like many other warbler species, it has colorful plumage during the spring and summer. However, outside the breeding season its plumage is drab and less distinctive. In the fall, the black-throated blue warbler can be distinguished by its small white wing patches. Juveniles have brown upperparts with a creamy supercilium and brownish spots on the throat, the breast and the belly.

The bird's song can be described as a buzzed zee-zee-zeeee with an upward inflection. Its call is a flat ctuk.

== Distribution and habitat ==
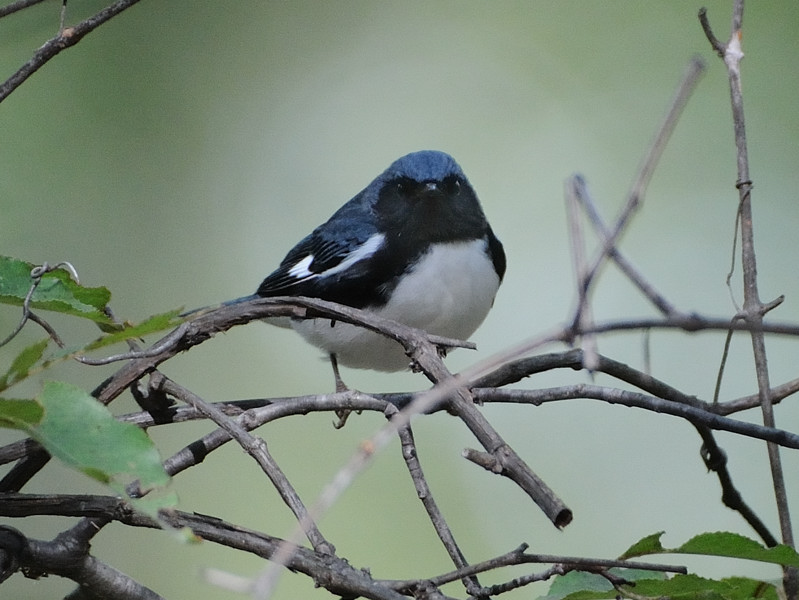
Male at the Pinery Provincial Park

The black-throated blue warbler is a migratory species. It breeds in temperate mature deciduous forests or mixed coniferous-deciduous forest with a thick understory. The species is often found in hilly and mountainous regions in the northeastern United States and southeastern Canada. In late summer, it migrates to the tropical wooded and scrub habitats in the Greater Antilles for wintering. Along the migration route, the black-throated blue warbler can be observed in habitats such as parks and gardens. Its nesting site is more important than its foraging site in playing a role in determining the habitat of the black-throated blue warbler. The black-throated blue warbler is an open-nesting species, that nests very close to the ground so it has to choose a protected nesting site where the risk of predation is relatively low.

== Behavior ==
=== Feeding and foraging ===
The black-throated blue warbler forages actively in low vegetation, sometimes hovering or catching insects in flight. It often forages in one area for a while before moving on to the next. It mainly eats invertebrates such as caterpillars, crane flies, and spiders. It may supplement its diet with seeds, berries, and fruit in the winter.

Males and females prefer different foraging sites. While males usually hover among the higher shrub foliage between 3 and 9 m (9.8 and 29.5 ft), females tend to forage at lower strata. The time within a breeding season influences where the males forage. When it is time to feed the fledglings, males come down to the same foraging strata as females. The black-throated blue warbler mostly forages in the understory instead of the canopy. The large leaves and long branches in the understory affect its foraging behaviors. The black-throated blue warbler more often hovers rather than gleans its prey because it is more difficult to glean among thick understory foliage.

=== Breeding ===
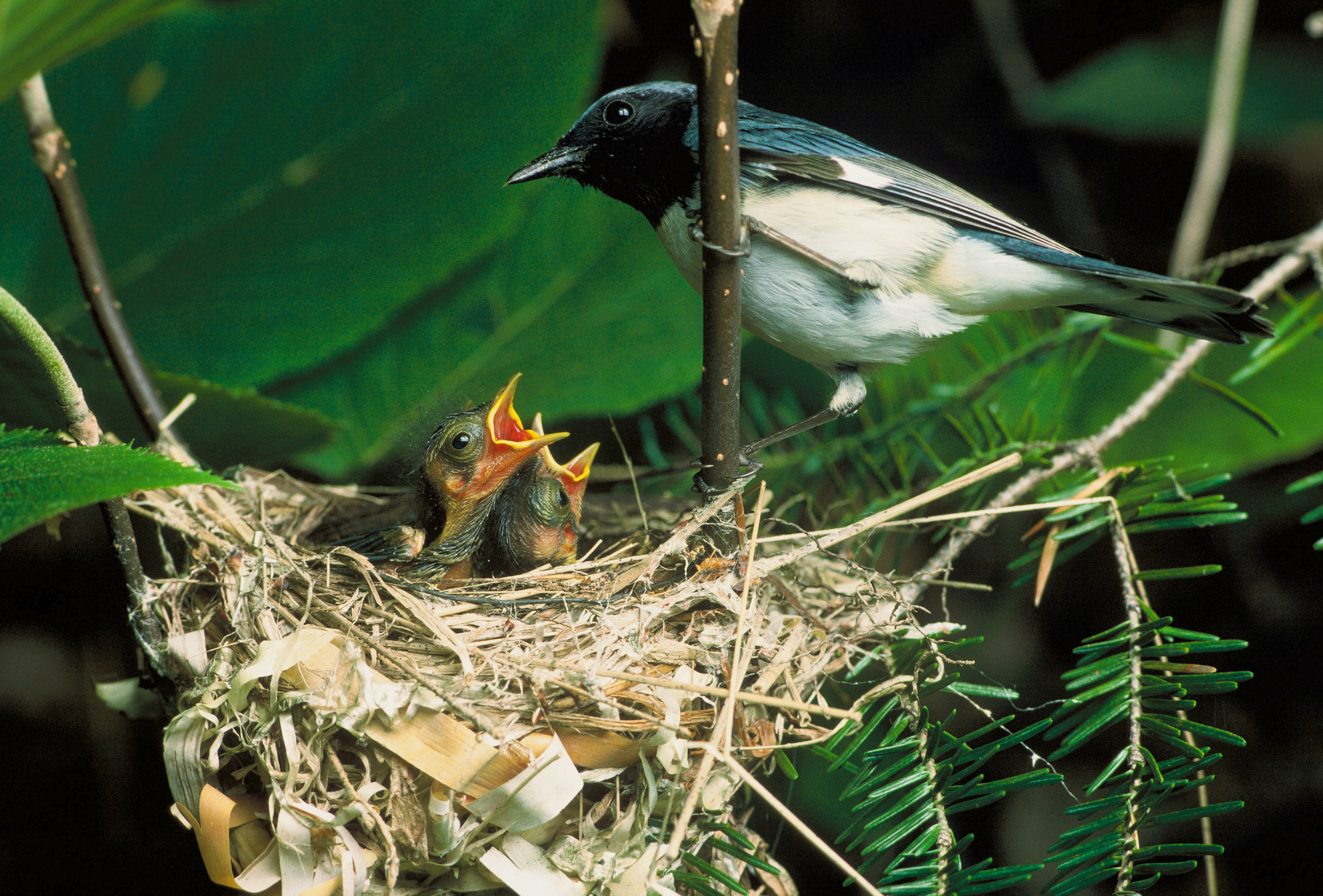
Typical nest site

The black-throated blue warbler is a monogamous species. Its breeding season usually begins in May and ends in July. As a songbird, the male black-throated blue warbler attracts a female's attention by singing a soft melody. He then follows the female while she is foraging or searching for nesting sites. As soon as the female stops to rest, the male droops his wings slightly, stretches his head forward and up, opens his bill, and faces the female. The female also makes displays to the male by vibrating her wings. In response, the male mounts the female for 2–3 seconds and then flies off. Females lay an average of 3.6 eggs per brood (range: 2 – 5 eggs) and incubate the eggs without male assistance for approximately 12 days. Both parents will feed offspring for approximately 9 days before the young are ready to fledge.

A 1996, researchers showed that the black-throated blue warbler prefers to reside in hardwood forests with higher shrub densities where food is more abundant compared to lower shrub density plots. Within these high shrub density habitats, not only is there a higher density of warblers, but the population age average is also older, being composed of males and females who are at least two years of age.

The black-throated blue warbler uses social cues in its evaluation and choice of nesting sites. In particular, it listens to the post-breeding songs given out by other males. These songs have strong temporal dependencies. Males sing at the beginning and the peak of breeding season, but songs are not indicative of reproductive success. Near the end of a breeding season, a male that has successfully mated continues to sing while a male that has failed to reproduce abandons the habitat. Therefore, post-breeding songs are reliable indicators of reproductive success within the particular habitat and convey essential information to the natal and breeding dispersers. In comparison to the traditional idea of direct assessment of the vegetation structure, the vocal cue is much more efficient and easier to obtain, hence revealing the advantage of social communication in survival and reproduction. A female, however, does not respond to post-breeding songs directly. Instead, she is likely to rely on the presence of males in deciding nesting sites.

==== Extra-pair mating ====
Although the black-throated blue warbler is a socially monogamous species, males are frequently observed in territories of other males, suggesting the occurrence of extra-pair matings. Nestling parentage is identified by microsatellites in a study plot at the Hubbard Brook Experimental Forest in New Hampshire. The results show that extra-pair fertilization occurs and that the majority of the extra-pair sires come from males in neighboring territories. Only very few extra-pair sires are from distant territories. This local reproductive interaction is also supported by another study conducted earlier, which finds that extra pair fertilizations are strongly and positively correlated with local synchrony but there is no significant association with population level synchrony.

Males engage in mate guarding during the period females are most vulnerable to successful extra pair copulations. They usually stay close to their social mate, singing slowly on the side and following the mate while she is foraging or searching for a nesting site. The guarding behavior, though, may conflict with males' pursuit of extra-pair fertilizations. It is not yet clear to what extent a male will prefer mate guarding over extra-pair fertilizations. Male retention studies have shown that removal of a male increases the chance of extra-pair offspring in the brood, suggesting that mate guarding reduces extra-pair fertilization attempts. The extra-pair fertilization rate nonetheless cannot be eliminated even if males are allowed to stay near their social mates during fertility risk period. Several hypotheses try to explain this phenomenon: females may be able to manage extra-pair mating even while its social mate is guarding it, or females may reject extra-pair copulation attempts by other males in the absence of male guarding.

Females who participate in extra-pair fertilizations may incorporate better genes in their offspring than they could get with their social mate, but they are likely to receive less help with parental care from their social mates because of cheating. Extra-pair fertilization, therefore, can be costly to females as well. A possible theory why extra-pair fertilization occurs is that female organisms select males with overall high heterozygosity or dissimilar genetics from themselves. A microsatellite study suggests an alternative to heterozygosity selection. Because no correlation is found between female extra-pair fertilization frequencies and the overall heterozygosity of their social mates, it is suggested that females may choose only a selective set of heterozygous genes, particularly the MHC locus, which can affect the immunocompetence of offspring.

=== Sexual selection ===
Song
Black-throated blue warblers singing in Smoky Mountain, North Carolina

Males' differential recognition of local and nonlocal songs has been studied in two populations: one in the northern United States (New Hampshire) and the other in the southern United States (North Carolina). An asymmetry of response has been found between the two populations. The northern black-throated blue warbler responds strongly to local songs but relatively weakly to the song of southern warblers. In contrast, a warbler from the south responds equally to songs from both the north and the south. A potential explanation of this asymmetry is the difference in female preference between the northern and southern black-throated blue warblers. Females from the north are less likely to mate with a "heterospecific" male from the south; therefore it is not necessary for a northern male to respond strongly to the song of a southern challenger. It is possible that a barrier to gene flow from south to north exists while a barrier to the reverse does not. Therefore, female choice of male songs is likely to play a role in gene flow and reproductive isolation, which may eventually lead to diversification.

It has long been believed that a male black-throated blue warbler achieves reproductive maturation well into its first breeding season. A yearling participates in extra-pair mating and cuckoldry as much as or even more than older males. However, research by Graves has found opposing evidence in terms of testicular size and sperm production. Directional asymmetry is present in many passerine birds. The left testicle is often larger in size than the right one, and this holds true for both yearling and older male warblers. However, the testicle to body mass ratio nonetheless is much lower in yearlings than in older males. Moreover, older males have a greater degree of directional asymmetry than do yearlings. Because the size of testes in birds is correlated to the ejaculate quality, it is likely that females employ age-dependent choice in favor of older males who can be distinguished by their definitive age-specific plumage.

== Status and threats ==
The black-throated blue warbler has a large range – 2,700,000 square kilometres (1,000,000 sq mi) – and an estimated population of 2.4 million individuals, which is increasing. This species was ranked as Least Concern by the IUCN in 2021. Deforestation and habitat fragmentation are threatening the black-throated blue warbler in its tropical wintering areas. A report in 2000 discussed the impact of global climate change on the population dynamics of the black-throated blue warbler by an observation from 1986 to 1998. In particular, the effect of El Niño Southern Oscillation (ENSO) was studied in relation to the survival, fecundity and recruitment of this migratory bird. It was found that El Niño years (the warm South Pacific oceanic phase) were associated with lower adult survival rate in their wintering ground, Jamaica, lower fecundity in the breeding habitats in New Hampshire of the United States, and lower annual recruitment of yearlings and juveniles to both breeding and wintering grounds. All the three factors were relatively higher during La Niña years (cold South Pacific Ocean) when the weather was wetter and the food availability was much more abundant. Long-term global warming can aggravate the ENSO effect, adding to the fluctuation of the black-throated blue warbler population.
