= Ontario Highway 21 =

Ontario provincial highway

Highway 21
- Bluewater Highway
- Highway 21 highlighted in red

Route information
- Maintained by the Ministry of Transportation of Ontario
- Length: 226.8 km (140.9 mi)
- Existed: May 25, 1927–present

Major junctions
- South end: Highway 402 near Wyoming
- Highway 8 in Goderich; Highway 9 in Kincardine
- North end: Highway 6 / Highway 10 / Highway 26 in Owen Sound

Location
- Country: Canada
- Province: Ontario
- Major cities: Grand Bend, Goderich, Kincardine, Southampton, Port Elgin, Owen Sound

Highway system
- Ontario provincial highways; Current; Former; 400-series
← Highway 20	→ Highway 23
Former provincial highways
Highway 22 →

King's Highway 21, commonly referred to as Highway 21, is a provincially maintained highway in the Canadian province of Ontario that begins at Highway 402 midway between Sarnia and London and ends at Highway 6, Highway 10 and Highway 26 in Owen Sound. The roadway is referred to as the Bluewater Highway because it remains very close to the eastern shoreline of Lake Huron.

Highway 21 was first designated by the Department of Highways (DHO) between Highway 3 and Highway 7 in mid-1927 and extended to Goderich in 1934. A year later, a final extension completed the route to Owen Sound. In 1997 and 1998, the portion of the route south of Highway 402 was transferred to the counties in which it laid. This segment is also known as Oil Heritage Road.

Highway 21 is often subject to winter closures due to lake effect caused by snowsquall, which can create sudden whiteout conditions along the Lake Huron shoreline. Several Emergency Detour Routes have been established further inland to guide drivers around such closures. Care should be taken during the winter months, as the storms can progress rapidly and unexpectedly.

== Route description ==
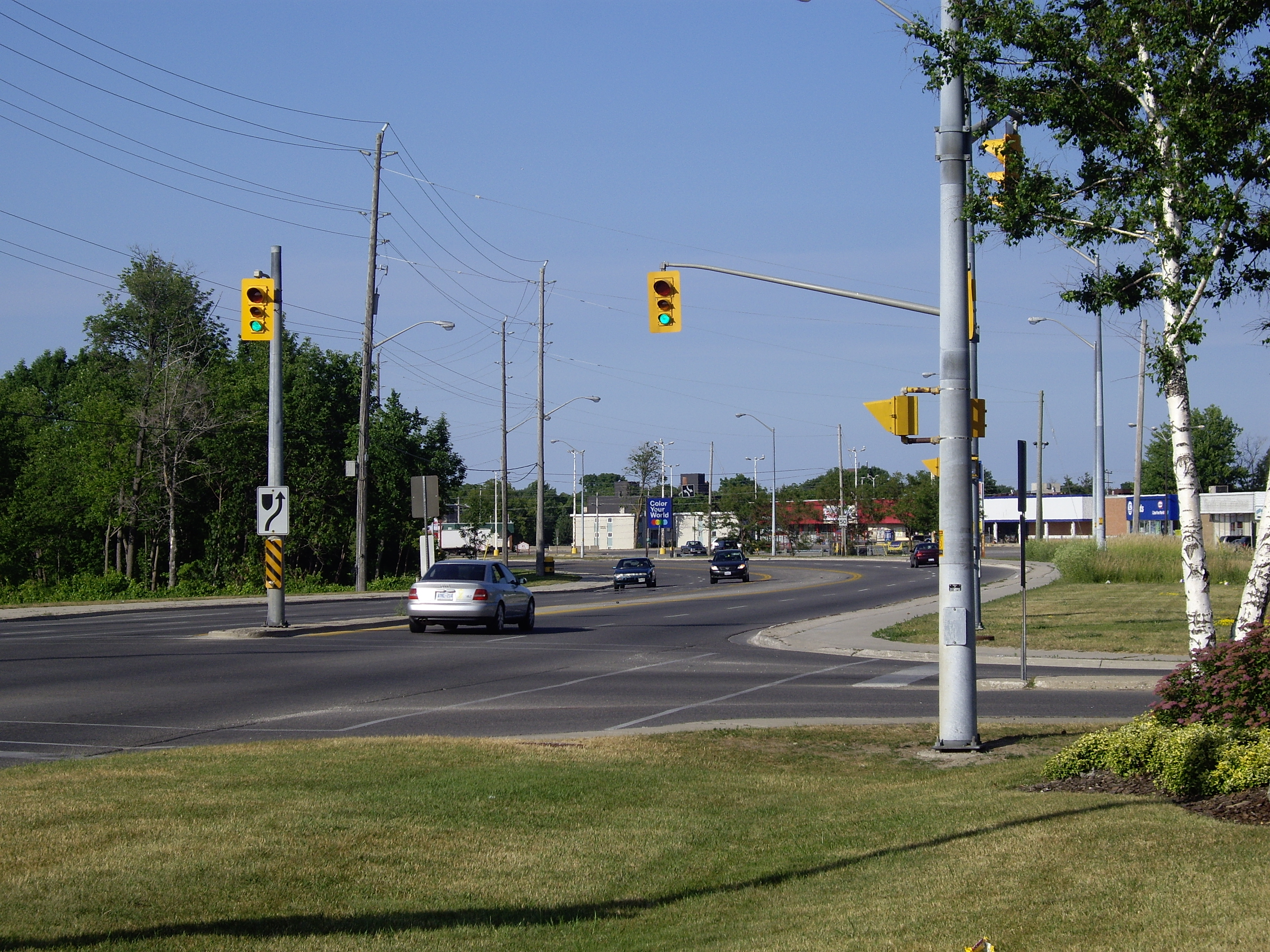
Southbound Highway 21 and northbound Highway 6 are concurrent in Owen Sound, the only example of a wrong-way concurrency in the provincial highway network.

Highway 21 is a long lakeside route through Southwestern Ontario, which serves numerous communities along the eastern shoreline of Lake Huron. Once over 100 kilometres (62 mi) longer than it is today, the highway now begins at Highway 402 near the community of Warwick, where it progresses north through the towns of Forest, Grand Bend, Goderich, Point Clark, Kincardine, Tiverton, Port Elgin, and Southampton. At Southampton, the highway veers away from the Lake Huron shoreline and travels east to Owen Sound.

The route is generally smoothly-flowing, but can be somewhat congested through towns during the summer from tourists and cottagers. Highway 21 is often subject to closures at various points as it lies on the lee shore of Lake Huron. Lake effect snow squalls frequently subject motorists to poor visibility and slippery conditions, leading to whiteout conditions. The Ontario Provincial Police claim that the road is the most-commonly closed in the province.

Highway 21 and Highway 6 descend the Niagara Escarpment into Owen Sound.

The highway begins at Exit 34 and progresses north towards Lake Huron. The mostly-straight section of the route lies within Lambton County and passes through the town of Forest. Near Kettle Point, the route abruptly curves north west and begins to parallel the shore of the lake, providing access to the village of Port Franks and The Pinery Provincial Park prior to entering Grand Bend. North of that village, the highway crosses into Huron County and intersects former Highway 83. Between there and Goderich, the west side of the highway is dominated by roads providing access to shoreline cottages.

At Goderich, the route encounters Highway 8, then crosses the Maitland River along a bypass constructed during the early 1960s; the original routing followed portions of Saltford Street and River Ridge Crescent. The highway proceeds straight north as the baseline at the shore of Lake Huron until it reaches Sheppardton. There the surveying grid changes orientation, and Highway 21 follows a forced road allowance that meanders approximately 2 km (1.2 mi) inland from lake north to Amberley, where it encounters former Highway 86, which travels to Waterloo, and enters. The route curves northeast as it enters Bruce County to align with the surveying grid and proceeds out of Amberley towards Kincardine.

Highways 21 and 6 form the only wrong-way concurrency in the Ontario highway network.

Between Amberley and Tiverton, Highway 21 travels straight-as-an-arrow along what was originally a rural concession road through the hamlets of Reid's Corners, Pine River, Huron Ridge and Slade. It bypasses inland of Kincardine, intersecting the western terminus of Highway 9. Within Tiverton, which acts as the primary town serving Bruce Nuclear Generating Station, traffic must turn to remain on Highway 21. As it exits southeast from the town, the highway makes a broad curve to the northeast and continues through the hamlets of Underwood and North Bruce.

As it approaches the southern end of the Bruce Peninsula, the route bisects Port Elgin, then curves abruptly towards Lake Huron and passes through Southampton before curving to the east towards Owen Sound. Between those two places, the highway is generally straight, except at the boundary between Bruce and Grey Counties as well as the descent of the Niagara Escarpment at Springmount. Several communities line the inland stretch of highway, including Chippewa Hill, Kelly's Corners, Elsinore, Allenford, Alvanley and Jackson. At Springmount, the route encounters Highway 6, which joins Highway 21 to form Ontario's only wrong-way concurrency east to Owen Sound.

== History ==
Highway 21 in Port Franks at the junction of what was then Highway 82

Highway 21 was the first King's Highway in Lambton County when it was assumed in 1927 between Highway 3 at Morpeth and Highway 7 at Reece's Corners. The original section of highway was rebuilt from a muddy trail to a plank road around 1860. When James Miller Williams, a Hamilton businessman, set out one day during a drought to dig a well, he chose a spot downhill from an existing oil seep in the village of Black Creek. Instead of encountering water, Williams hit a shallow oil deposit. As a result of the ensuing oil boom, which would begin the petroleum industry in North America, Williams laid out the village and changed its name to Oil Springs. Two competing plank road companies were formed, the Black Creek Plank Road Company (of which Williams was a principal investor) and the Sarnia to Florence Plank Road Company, both of which aimed their roads through Oil Springs. Although both roads were constructed, the former company was more prosperous in its endeavours; in 1886, a significant portion of the Sarnia to Florence Plank Road was closed up and turned over to local property owners. The Black Creek Plank Road Company meanwhile had transformed the muddy quagmire of a path into a well-maintained road. By 1863, three miles of road south of Wyoming had been paved, and the remainder south to Oil Springs planked (the Sarnia Road followed two years later). However, as the oil boom faded, so too did improvement to the road.

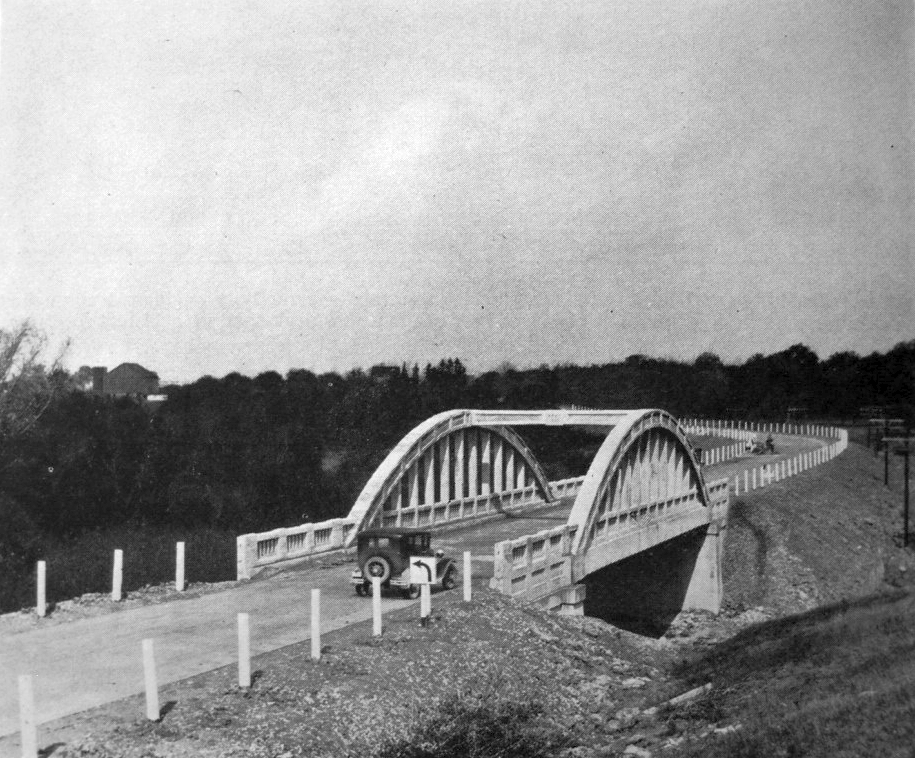
Highway 21 near Petrolia. A Bowstring Arch bridge was constructed to replace the existing county-built bridge shortly after the department designated Highway 21.

On May 25 and June 1, 1927, the Department of Highways assumed the unpaved road between Highway 7 at Reece's Corner and Highway 3 at Morpeth, via Dresden, Thamesville and Ridgetown as Provincial Highway 21, which was changed to the current King's Highway 21 in 1930. That year, the department set out to improve the new highway. Concrete slabs were laid between Petrolia and Highway 7, as well as along a 7.25-kilometre (4.50 mi) section between Thamesville and Dresden. The following year, the route was paved between Dresden and Edys Mills before the effects of the Great Depression forced the department to concentrate on paving Highway 22. The election of a new government in mid-1934 led to the resumption of work in June as a depression relief project. New equipment (namely a Caterpillar Excavator), as well as the expertise of Andy Newman, an engineer who was hired when he demonstrated his abilities with the machinery upon passing a construction site on his drive home. Newman, who helped design the machine that nobody else could operate, allowed work to proceed at a much faster rate than before. The machinery could dig quicker than 50 men, and the effort showed when the gap between Petrolia and Edys Mills and the remaining gaps between Dresden and Thamesville were graded and paved by the end of the summer. On October 19, 1934, Highway 21 was officially opened by Robert Mellville Smith, deputy minister of the Department of Highways.

On April 4, 1934, Highway 21 was assumed through Huron County as far north as Goderich, which was followed by the assumption of a section through Bosanquet Township on April 18, creating a 40.6 kilometres (25.2 mi) concurrency with Highway 7 from Reece's Corners to Thedford. From there, the route travelled through Thedford to Port Franks, where it merged into the present highway. A final 137.4-kilometre (85.4 mi) extension to Owen Sound was assumed on May 15, 1935, bringing the highway to its greatest length of 333.1 kilometres (207.0 mi).

Excavation work to bypass Highway 21 north of the Maitland River near Goderich

Meanwhile, on April 11, 1934, the department assumed control of a road connecting Highway 7 with Forest as Highway 21A. It was later extended to connect with Highway 21 at Port Franks on August 19, 1936. By 1938, Highway 21A had been renumbered as Highway 21, and Highway 21 through Thedford renumbered as Highway 82.

Beginning in 1960, a small bypass of Highway 21 was constructed on the north side of Goderich, avoiding a nearby hairpin turn. The 160 m (520 ft) curving structure over the Maitland River was completed in mid-1961 at a cost of C$1.39 million and opened ceremoniously on July 17, 1962.

During the early 1980s, the construction of Highway 402 east from Sarnia resulted in a shift in the route of the highway. The route was extended north from Reece's Corners to Exit 25, while the section from Highway 7 north to Exit 34 was "downloaded", or transferred to the local municipality in which it resided. With Highway 402 as the connecting provincial link between the two segments of Highway 21, the two parclo interchanges each include a directional ramp to facilitate traffic.

Further transfers were performed in 1997 and 1998. On April 1, 1997, the section of Highway 21 from Highway 401 south to Morpeth was transferred to Kent County. On January 1, 1998, the section between Highway 401 and Highway 402 was transferred to Kent and Lambton counties.

== Major intersections ==
The following table lists the major junctions along Highway 21, as noted by the Ministry of Transportation of Ontario.

Division	Location	km	mi	Destinations	Notes
Chatham-Kent	Morpeth	−100.0	−62.1	Municipal Road 17 south Municipal Road 3 – Leamington, St. Thomas	Former Highway 21 southern terminus; formerly Highway 3; former Highway 21 follows Municipal Road 17
Chatham-Kent		−86.8	−53.9	Highway 401 – Windsor, Toronto Municipal Road 17 ends Municipal Road 21 begins	Highway 401 exit 109
Chatham-Kent	Thamesville	−77.0	−47.8	Municipal Road 2 (Thameswood Road)	Formerly Highway 2
Chatham-Kent	Dresden	−57.0	−35.4	Municipal Road 29 east (Croton Line); Municipal Road 78 west (McCreary Line)	Formerly Highway 78 west
Chatham-Kent–Lambton boundary	Dawn-Euphemia	−53.9	−33.5	Chatham-Kent Municipal Road 21 ends Lambton County Road 21 begins	Chatham-Kent Municipal Road 21 northern terminus; Lambton County Road 21 southern terminus
Lambton	Enniskillen	−29.2	−18.1	County Road 80 (Courtright Line)	Oil City; formerly Highway 80; near Oil Springs
Lambton	Petrolia	−21.6	−13.4	County Road 4 (Petrolia Line)	
Lambton	Plympton-Wyoming	−10.6	−6.6	County Road 22 (London Line)	Reeces Corners; formerly Highway 7
Lambton	Plympton-Wyoming	−9.3	−5.8	Highway 402 west – Sarnia County Road 21 ends County Road 30 north	Former southern end of Highway 402 concurrency; Highway 402 exit 25; Lambton County Road 21 northern terminus
Lambton	Plympton-Wyoming–Warwick boundary	0.0	0.0	Highway 402 east – London County Road 8 south (Forest Road)	Southern terminus; former northern end of Highway 402 concurrency; Highway 402 exit 34
Lambton	Plympton-Wyoming–Warwick boundary	6.7	4.2	County Road 11 west (Aberarder Line)	
Lambton	Lambton Shores (Forest)	10.4	6.5	Hickory Creek Bridge	Beginning of Forest Connecting Link agreement
Lambton	Lambton Shores (Forest)	12.7	7.9	County Road 12 (Townsend Line)	
Lambton	Lambton Shores (Forest)	14.0	8.7		End of Forest Connecting Link agreement
Lambton	Lambton Shores	18.7	11.6	County Road 6 east (Thomson Line)	
Lambton	Lambton Shores	20.8	12.9	County Road 7 east (Lakeshore Road)	Kettle Point
Lambton	Lambton Shores	30.8	19.1	County Road 79 south (Northville Road) – Thedford	Port Franks; formerly Highway 79 south
Lambton	Lambton Shores	38.1	23.7	County Road 5 east (Greenway Road)	
Lambton	Lambton Shores (Grand Bend)	43.8	27.2	Pinetree Drive	Beginning of Grand Bend Connecting Link agreement
Lambton	Lambton Shores (Grand Bend)	46.2	28.7	Main Street	To County Road 81 south; formerly Highway 81
Lambton–Huron boundary	Lambton Shores–South Huron boundary	46.4	28.8		End of Grand Bend Connecting Link agreement
Huron	South Huron–Bluewater boundary	49.0	30.4	County Road 83 (Dashwood Road) – Exeter	Formerly Highway 83 east
Huron	Bluewater	58.3	36.2	County Road 84 east (Zurich–Hensall Road) – Zurich	St. Joseph; formerly Highway 84 east
Huron	Bluewater	74.3	46.2	County Road 3 east (Mill Road) – Seaforth	Bayfield
Huron	Central Huron	78.1	48.5	County Road 13 east (Bayfield Road) – Clinton	
Huron	Central Huron	84.3	52.4	County Road 18 east (Cut Line Road)	
Huron	Goderich	92.0	57.2	Huckins Street	Beginning of Goderich Connecting Link agreement
Huron	Goderich	93.7	58.2	Highway 8 east (Huron Road) – Clinton	
Huron	Goderich	94.8	58.9	Gloucester Terrace	End of Goderich Connecting Link agreement
Huron	Ashfield-Colborne-Wawanosh	95.9	59.6	County Road 31 east (Saltford Road) – Saltford	
Huron	Ashfield-Colborne-Wawanosh	98.4	61.1	County Road 25 (Blyth Road) – Blyth	
Huron	Ashfield-Colborne-Wawanosh	118.0	73.3	County Road 20 (Belgrave Road) – Belgrave	Kintail
Huron–Bruce boundary	Ashfield-Colborne-Wawanosh–Huron-Kinloss boundary	128.3	79.7	Huron County Road 86 east / Bruce County Road 86 east	Amberley; formerly Highway 86 south
Bruce	Huron-Kinloss	136.5	84.8	County Road 6 east	
Bruce	Kincardine	145.1	90.2	Highway 9 east (Broadway Street) – Walkerton	
Bruce	Kincardine	157.1	97.6	County Road 15 west – Inverhuron	Tiverton
Bruce	Kincardine	162.1	100.7	County Road 15 east	
Bruce	Kincardine	166.3	103.3	County Road 20	
Bruce	Kincardine–Saugeen Shores boundary	173.0	107.5	County Road 11 east	North Bruce
Bruce	Saugeen Shores	177.1	110.0	County Road 40 east	
Bruce	Saugeen Shores	179.2	111.3	County Road 25 west	
Bruce	Saugeen Shores (Port Elgin)	179.9	111.8		Beginning of Port Elgin Connecting Link agreement
Bruce	Saugeen Shores (Port Elgin)	183.1	113.8	County Road 17 east (Gustavus Street)	
Bruce	Saugeen Shores (Port Elgin)	184.1	114.4		End of Port Elgin Connecting Link agreement
Bruce	Saugeen Shores	186.2	115.7	County Road 3 east – Burgoyne	
Bruce	Saugeen Shores (Southampton)	186.8	116.1	South Street	Beginning of Southampton Connecting Link agreement
Bruce	Saugeen Shores (Southampton)	190.1	118.1	County Road 13 north (Turner Street)	
Bruce	Saugeen Shores (Southampton)	192.1	119.4	Craig Street	End of Southampton Connecting Link agreement
Bruce	South Bruce Peninsula–Arran-Elderslie	203.9	126.7	County Road 14 north – Sauble Beach	
Bruce	South Bruce Peninsula–Arran-Elderslie	207.3	128.8	County Road 10 south – Tara	
Bruce–Grey boundary	Arran-Elderslie–Georgian Bluffs boundary	210.3	130.7	Bruce County Road 10 north / Grey County Road 10 north	Alvanley; formerly Highway 6 north
Grey	Georgian Bluffs	216.0	134.2	County Road 3 south	Jackson
Grey	Georgian Bluffs	221.4	137.6	Highway 6 north – Wiarton; County Road 18 south	Springmount; formerly Highway 70 north; southern end of Highway 6 wrong-way concurrency
Grey	Owen Sound	224.1	139.2	County Road 17B north / 9th Avenue West	Beginning of Owen Sound Connecting Link
Grey	Owen Sound	225.4	140.1	County Road 1 north (2nd Avenue West)	
Grey	Owen Sound	226.8	140.9	Highway 6 south / Highway 10 (10th Street E) – Chatsworth Highway 26 east (9th Avenue E) – Collingwood	Northern end of Highway 6 wrong-way concurrency; northern terminus
1.000 mi = 1.609 km; 1.000 km = 0.621 mi: Closed/former; Concurrency terminus
