= Ausable River (Lake Huron) =

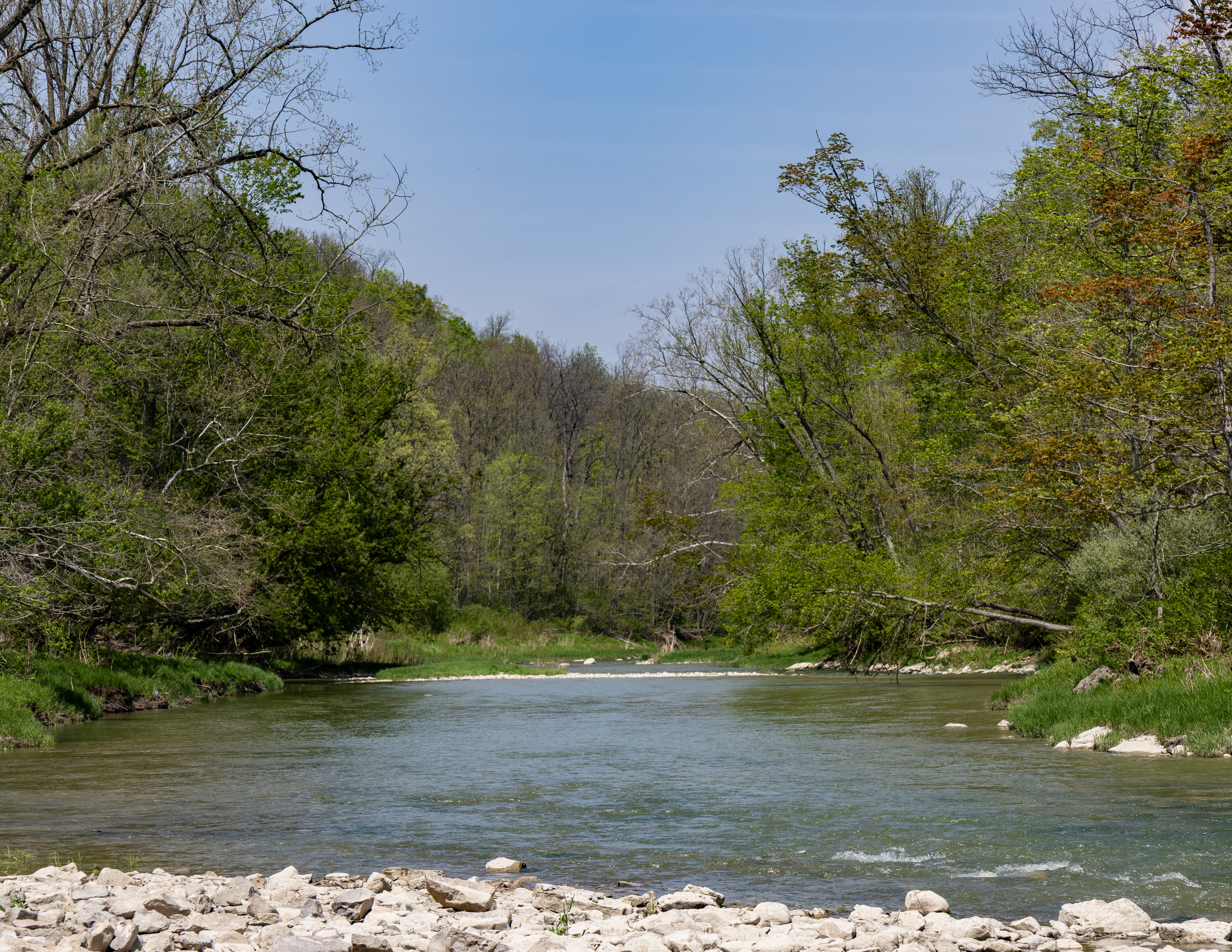
- Ausable River in Lambton County

- Location of the mouth of the Ausable River in Ontario
- Etymology: from the French Rivière aux Sables, sandy river

Location
- Country: Canada
- Province: Ontario
- Counties: Perth; Huron; Middlesex; Lambton
- Municipalities: West Perth; Bluewater; South Huron; North Middlesex; Adelaide–Metcalfe; Lambton Shores

Physical characteristics
- Source: Staffa
  - location: West Perth, Perth County
  - coordinates: 43°28′26″N 81°18′54″W
  - elevation: 334 m (1,096 ft)
- Mouth: Lake Huron
  - location: Port Franks, Lambton Shores, Lambton County, Ontario
  - coordinates: 43°18′49″N 81°46′03″W
  - elevation: 176 m (577 ft)

Basin features
- Tributaries
  - left: Little AuSable River

The Ausable River is a river in southwestern Ontario, Canada, which empties into Lake Huron at Port Franks, Ontario. The Ausable's initial source is in a moraine near the community of Staffa, Ontario located in the municipality of West Perth, Ontario at a point 334 metres (1,096 ft) above sea level. Although the river has a total measured length of over 240 kilometres (150 mi), because of its meandering course, the mouth in actuality is only 64 kilometres (40 mi) from its source near Staffa. The Ausable drains 1,142 square kilometres (441 sq mi) of land, and falls 158 metres (518 ft) in elevation from source to outlet.

In 1875, engineers of the Canada Company engaged in a large scale drainage project, referred to locally as "The Cut", which altered the course of the river dramatically and permitted the draining of several local small lakes and wetlands for agricultural purposes. Before that time the Ausable passed through the village of Grand Bend, where it made an abrupt curve toward the south, paralleling the Lake Huron shoreline for several kilometers, before entering the lake at Port Franks. This abrupt "bend" in the course of the river, is the origin of the name of the community of Grand Bend. The former course of the river, sections of which almost completely dry up during the summer season, can still be seen in Pinery Provincial Park. It is referred to as the Old Ausable Channel.

The river provides habitat for several endangered freshwater mussel species, several threatened or endangered fish species and the threatened eastern spiny softshell turtle.

The formation of the Ausable Gorge by the river near Arkona has exposed fossils from the Middle Devonian period. At one time, a hydroelectric plant was located at nearby Rock Glen Falls.

This river was called Rivière aux Sables or "sandy river" by the French which through time became the Aux Sables River in English. The name was condensed to Ausable in the early 20th century.

The Anishinaabeg who signed Huron Tract Treaty #29 referred to the river as “Niigaanziibii” / Niigaansibiing” and the river is the eastern boundary of the Stony Point reserve which is 1/2 of the land base for the Anishinaabeg Of Kettle and Stony Point First Nations Band (Chippewas of Kettle and Stony Point First Nation -CKSPFN).

== Tributaries ==
- Little AuSable River

== See also ==
- Aux Sables River
- Beach O' Pines
