= Au Sable River =

Au Sable River or variants may refer to:

== Canada ==
- Ausable River (Lake Huron), Ontario
- Aux Sables River (Spanish River), Ontario
- Rivière aux Sables (Saguenay River), in Saguenay-Lac-Saint-Jean, Quebec

== United States ==
- Au Sable River (Michigan)
- Ausable River (New York), also known as "AuSable River"

== See also ==
- Sauble River (disambiguation)
- Au Sable (disambiguation)
