= Sauble River =

Sauble River may refer to:

- Sauble River (Ontario), in Bruce County
- Big Sable River, also known as the Sauble River, in Michigan

== See also ==
- Au Sable River (disambiguation)
