= Au Sable =

Au Sable, Ausable or Aux Sable may refer to a documentary film or various places:

- Au Sable (documentary), a film about the Michigan river, canoe race and people

== Illinois ==
- Aux Sable Township, Grundy County, Illinois

== Michigan ==
- Au Sable Township, Iosco County, Michigan
  - Au Sable, Michigan, an unincorporated community in the above township
- Au Sable Township, Roscommon County, Michigan

== New York ==
- Au Sable, New York
- Ausable Chasm

== See also ==
- Au Sable River (disambiguation)
