= Lambton Shores =

- Municipality (lower-tier)
- Municipality of Lambton Shores
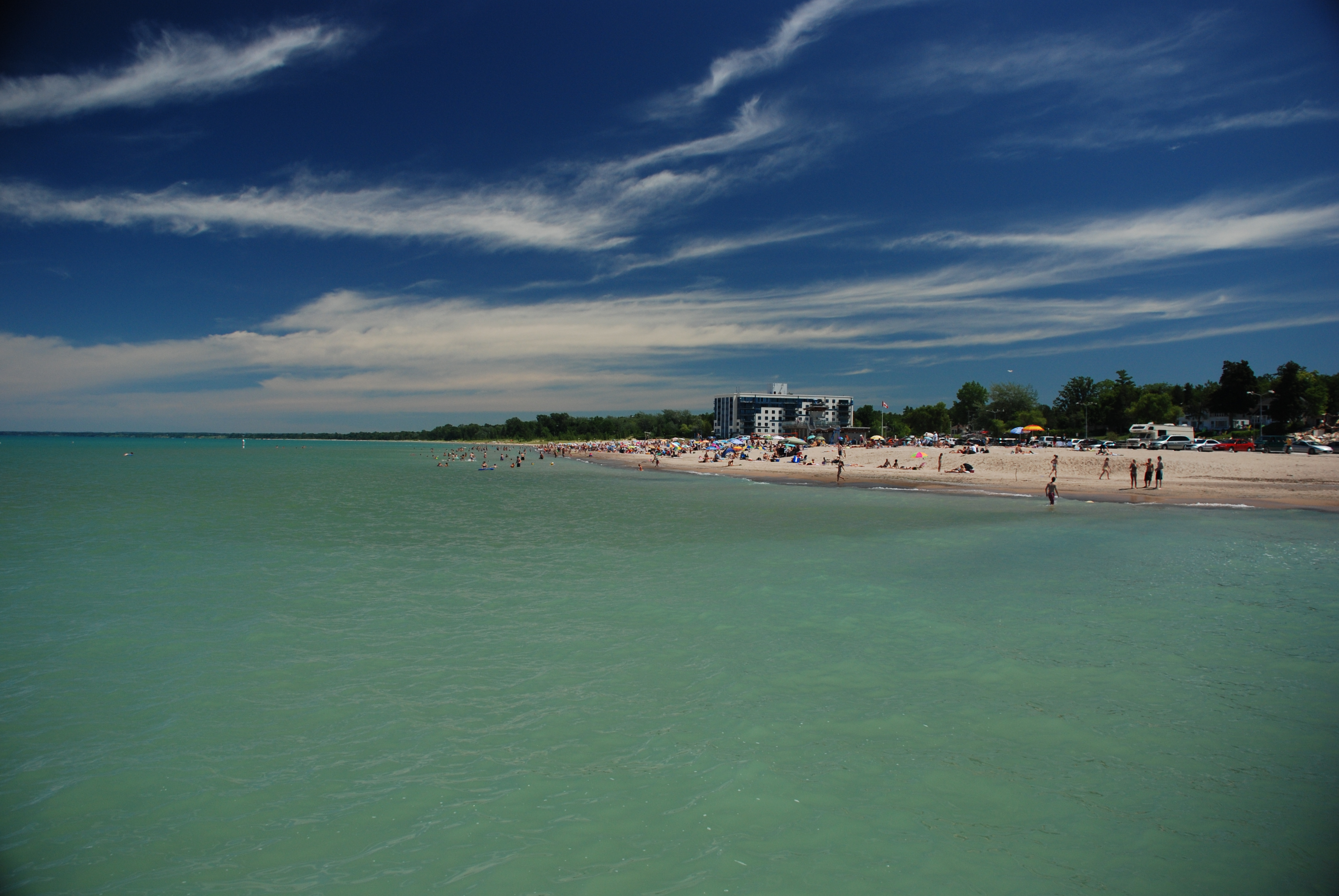
- Grand Bend

- Location within Lambton County Location within Southern Ontario
- Coordinates: 43°11′N 81°54′W
- Country: Canada
- Province: Ontario
- County: Lambton
- Formed: 2001

Government
  - Mayor: Doug Cook
  - Federal riding: Sarnia—Lambton—Bkejwanong
  - Prov. riding: Lambton—Kent—Middlesex

Area
  - Land: 331.20 km^{2} (127.88 sq mi)

Population (2016)
  - Total: 10,631
  - Density: 32.1/km^{2} (83/sq mi)
- Time zone: UTC-5 (EST)
  - Summer (DST): UTC-4 (EDT)
- Postal Code: N0N 1J 0-9/N0M
- Area codes: 519 and 226
- Website: www.lambtonshores.ca

Lambton Shores is a municipality in Lambton County, Ontario, Canada, that is on the southern shores of Lake Huron.

== History ==
Lambton Shores was formed in 2001 when the Township of Bosanquet was amalgamated with the town of Forest, and the villages of Arkona, Grand Bend and Thedford.

== Climate ==
Lambton Shores is one of the more southerly municipalities in Canada, and therefore has on average relatively milder temperatures than much of the country. It has an average high of 26–27 °C (79–81 °F) in July and −1 °C (30 °F) in January. As for precipitation, average annual rainfall is 803.4 millimetres (31.63 in), with frequent summer thunderstorms. Average annual snowfall is 159.9 centimetres (63.0 in), much of it derived from Lake effect, being that the municipality is located on the shores of Lake Huron.

Climate data for Thedford (1981−2010, extremes 1882–present (Note: Long term records have been recorded at various climate stations in or nearby Lambton Shores since 1882))
| Month | Jan | Feb | Mar | Apr | May | Jun | Jul | Aug | Sep | Oct | Nov | Dec | Year |
|---|---|---|---|---|---|---|---|---|---|---|---|---|---|
| Record high °C (°F) | 17.8 (64.0) | 22.0 (71.6) | 28.0 (82.4) | 31.1 (88.0) | 33.3 (91.9) | 38.0 (100.4) | 38.9 (102.0) | 38.3 (100.9) | 37.8 (100.0) | 32.5 (90.5) | 26.1 (79.0) | 19.0 (66.2) | 38.9 (102.0) |
| Mean daily maximum °C (°F) | −0.9 (30.4) | 0.0 (32.0) | 5.1 (41.2) | 12.2 (54.0) | 18.9 (66.0) | 24.5 (76.1) | 26.6 (79.9) | 25.6 (78.1) | 21.9 (71.4) | 14.7 (58.5) | 7.7 (45.9) | 1.3 (34.3) | 13.2 (55.8) |
| Daily mean °C (°F) | −4.2 (24.4) | −3.8 (25.2) | 0.7 (33.3) | 7.1 (44.8) | 13.1 (55.6) | 18.7 (65.7) | 21.0 (69.8) | 20.2 (68.4) | 16.4 (61.5) | 10.2 (50.4) | 4.3 (39.7) | −1.6 (29.1) | 8.5 (47.3) |
| Mean daily minimum °C (°F) | −7.5 (18.5) | −7.6 (18.3) | −3.7 (25.3) | 1.9 (35.4) | 7.2 (45.0) | 12.7 (54.9) | 15.4 (59.7) | 14.6 (58.3) | 10.8 (51.4) | 5.6 (42.1) | 0.9 (33.6) | −4.5 (23.9) | 3.8 (38.8) |
| Record low °C (°F) | −33 (−27) | −34.5 (−30.1) | −30 (−22) | −16.7 (1.9) | −6.7 (19.9) | −1.1 (30.0) | 1.1 (34.0) | 1.5 (34.7) | −2.8 (27.0) | −10 (14) | −20.6 (−5.1) | −26.7 (−16.1) | −34.5 (−30.1) |
| Average precipitation mm (inches) | 73.8 (2.91) | 57.6 (2.27) | 57.6 (2.27) | 78.9 (3.11) | 80.9 (3.19) | 76.4 (3.01) | 87.2 (3.43) | 79.7 (3.14) | 103.0 (4.06) | 94.3 (3.71) | 89.5 (3.52) | 84.5 (3.33) | 963.3 (37.93) |
| Average rainfall mm (inches) | 29.1 (1.15) | 23.7 (0.93) | 35.3 (1.39) | 74.7 (2.94) | 80.9 (3.19) | 76.4 (3.01) | 87.2 (3.43) | 79.7 (3.14) | 103.0 (4.06) | 92.9 (3.66) | 77.8 (3.06) | 42.9 (1.69) | 803.4 (31.63) |
| Average snowfall cm (inches) | 44.7 (17.6) | 33.9 (13.3) | 22.3 (8.8) | 4.2 (1.7) | 0.0 (0.0) | 0.0 (0.0) | 0.0 (0.0) | 0.0 (0.0) | 0.0 (0.0) | 1.4 (0.6) | 11.7 (4.6) | 41.7 (16.4) | 159.9 (63.0) |
| Average precipitation days (≥ 0.2 mm) | 14.5 | 10.8 | 12.8 | 13.4 | 12.8 | 10.9 | 11.1 | 10.9 | 12.4 | 15.0 | 15.1 | 14.5 | 153.9 |
| Average rainy days (≥ 0.2 mm) | 4.6 | 3.4 | 7.3 | 12.6 | 12.8 | 10.9 | 11.1 | 10.9 | 12.4 | 14.9 | 12.7 | 6.8 | 120.1 |
| Average snowy days (≥ 0.2 cm) | 10.6 | 8.3 | 6.3 | 1.5 | 0.0 | 0.0 | 0.0 | 0.0 | 0.0 | 0.38 | 3.0 | 9.0 | 38.8 |
Source: Environment Canada

== Communities ==
The main communities in Lambton Shores are Arkona, Forest, Grand Bend, Port Franks and Thedford. Smaller communities include Cedarview, Glendale Beach, Kettle and Stoney Point, Ipperwash Beach, Lake Valley Grove, Jericho, Jura, Kinnaird, Northville, Ravenswood, Southcott Pines, Springvale, Sunnidale, Walden Place and Walker Woods. The administrative offices of the township are located in Thedford.

=== Arkona ===
Arkona is a community located in the municipality of Lambton Shores in southwestern Ontario near the Lambton–Middlesex county line, situated beside the Ausable River, on Former Kings Highway 79 (now Lambton County Road 79), Arkona is roughly halfway between Thedford, and Watford.

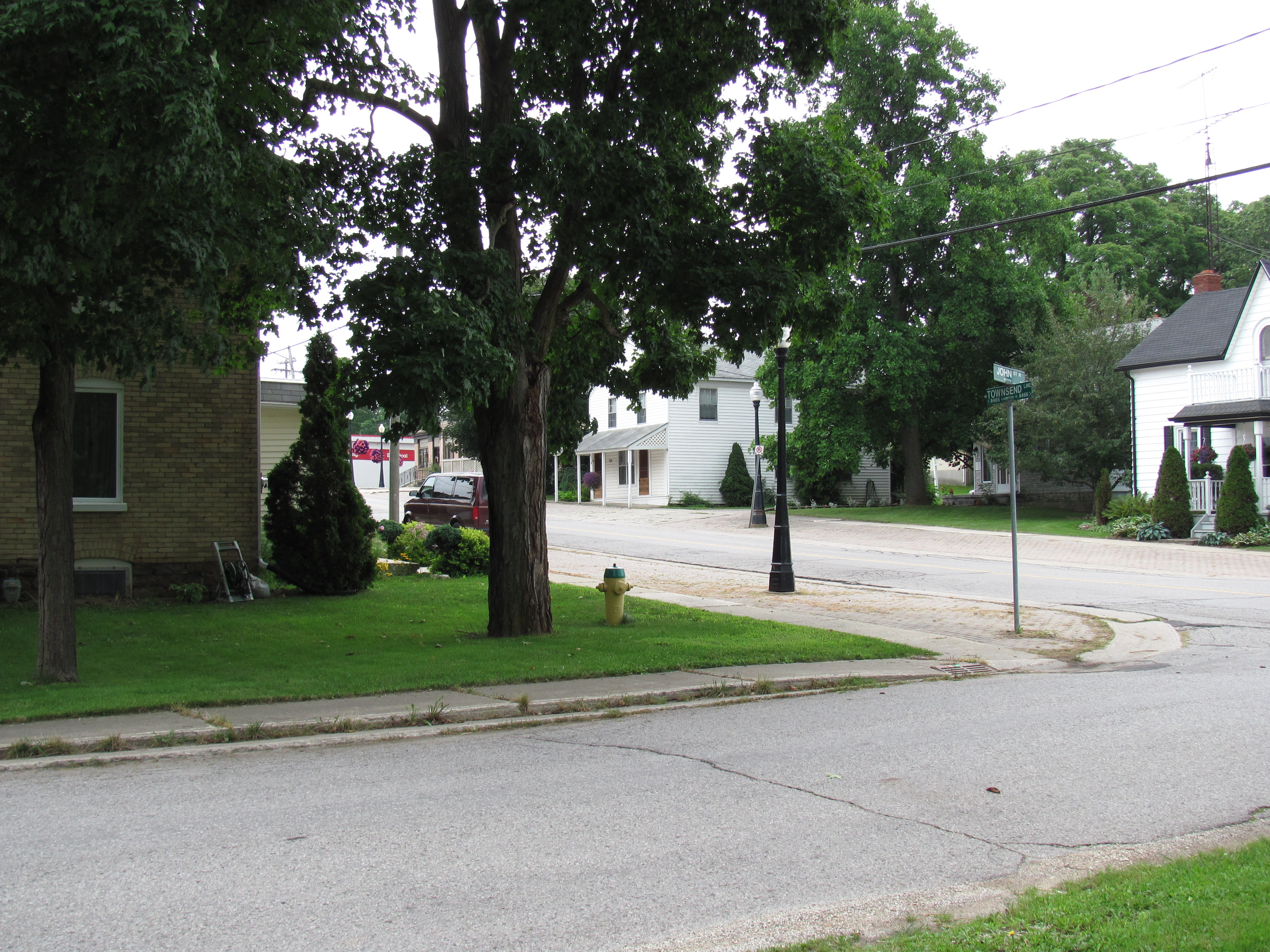
Arkona, Ontario, Canada

=== Forest ===
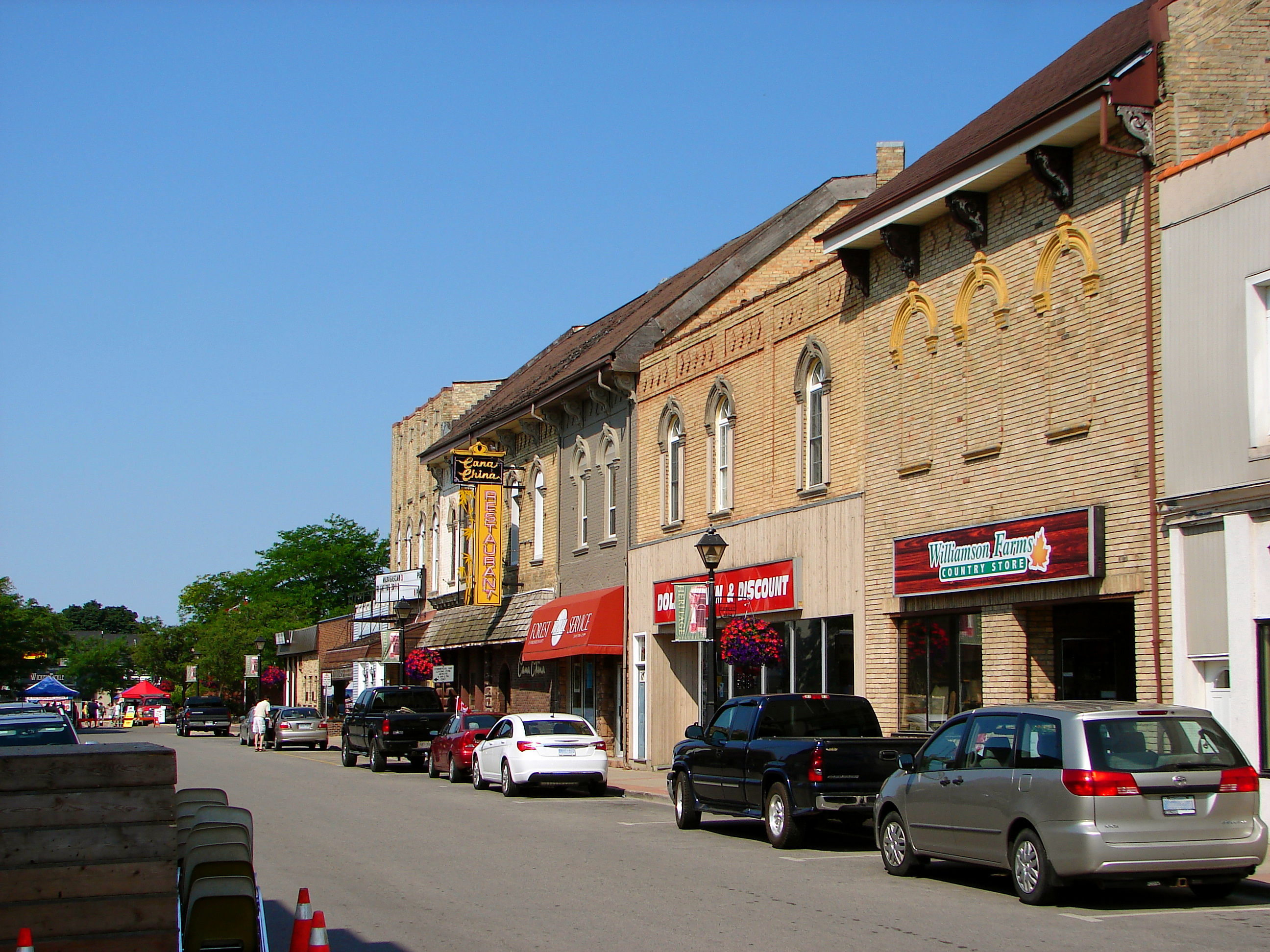
Forest, Ontario, Canada

Forest is situated on what was once dense forest. When the Grand Trunk Railway was built through where the town now sits, the station was named for the dense forest. Hickory Creek, which meanders through the town, provided water for the station in those days when wood and water were essential to the operation of steam locomotives.

=== Grand Bend ===
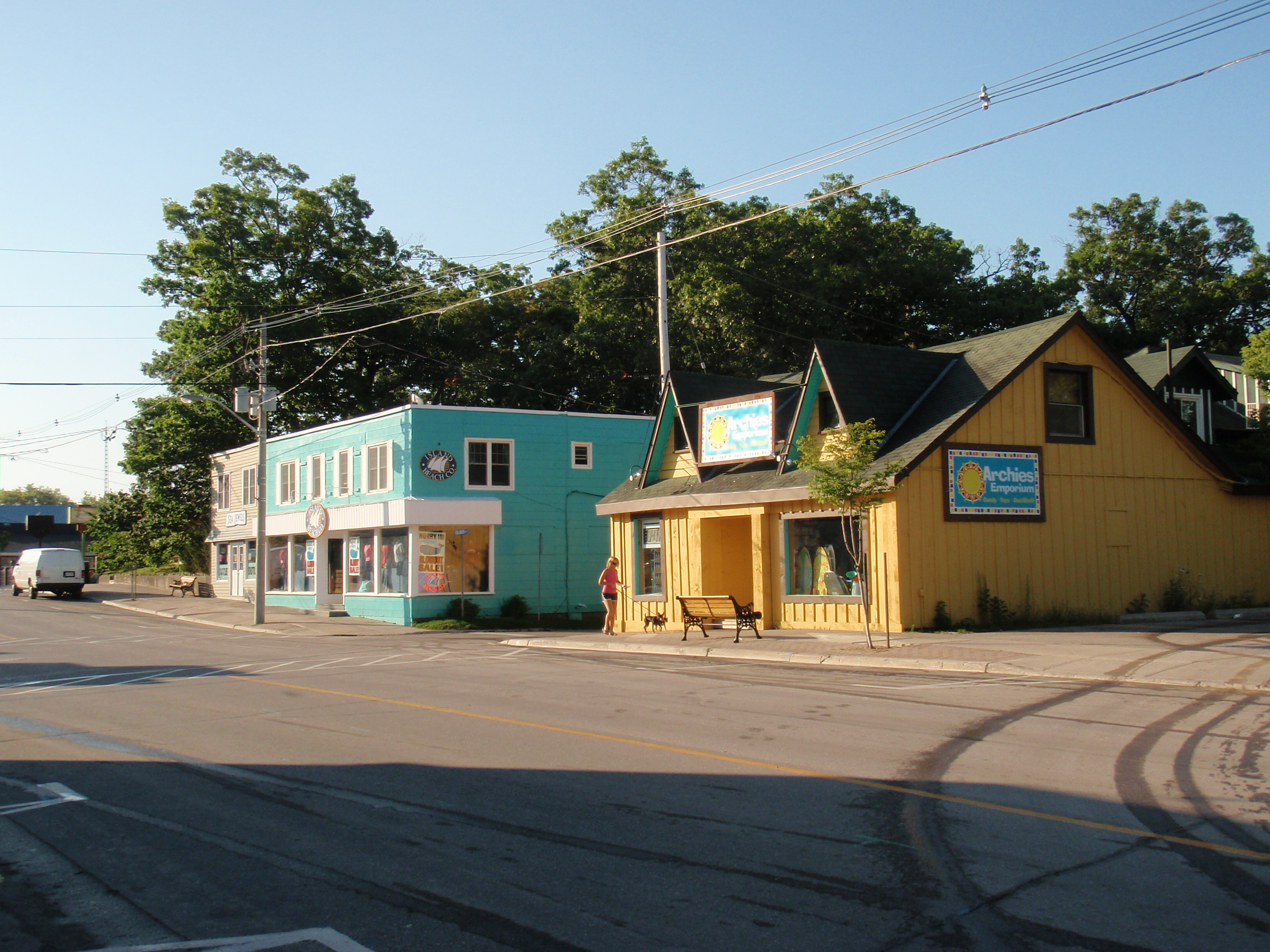
Main Street in Grand Bend

The settlement began in the 1830s when a group of English and Scottish settlers bought lots from the Canada Company, a land development firm. One of the original settlers, Benjamin Brewster gave his name to the village after he and his business partner David Smart secured rights to dam the Ausable River and started a sawmill in 1832. The villagers were mainly the families of the millhands and fisherman. Their homesteads were situated on the south side of the present village.

=== Thedford ===
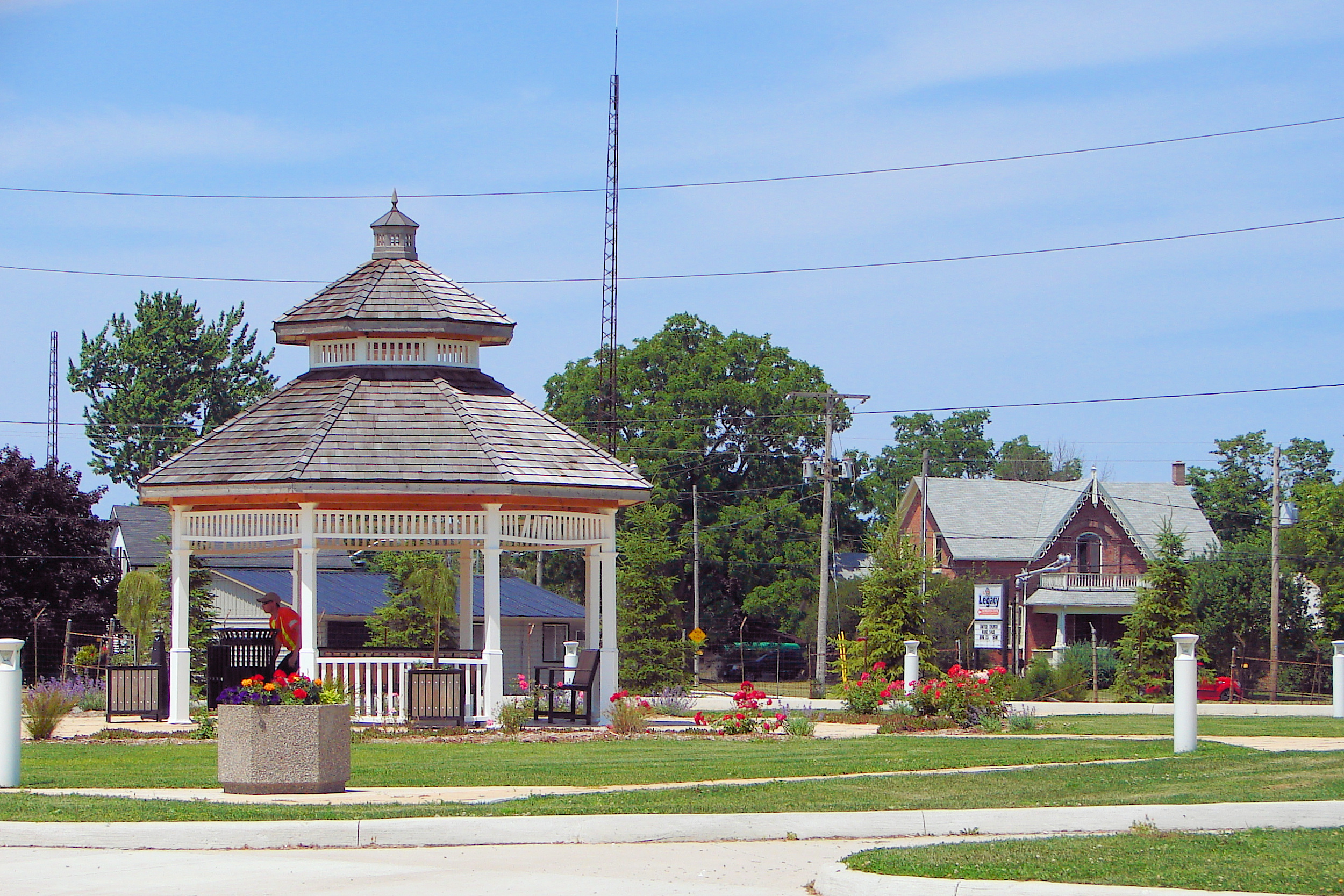
Thedford, Ontario, Canada

Thedford is a small community in northwestern Lambton County, Ontario Canada, situated 8 km south of Kings Highway 21, along Lambton CR 79 (Former Kings Highway 79). The community began in the 1860s when farmer Nelson Southworth, a native of Vermont, agreed to donate land for the construction of a Grand Trunk Railway station, with the condition that he would be able to name it. Southworth chose the name "Thetford", as a way of honouring Thetford, Vermont, a community in his home state in the United States. A local clerk's poor hand writing was mistaken for the current spelling, which is how it first appeared on official records. The Thedford Raiders Hockey Team once held the World Record for Longest Continuous Hockey Game, which was also a fundraiser for juvenile diabetes. A plaque at the entrance of the town heralds it as the "Onion Capital of Canada".

A designated place within the municipality of Lambton Shores, Thedford had a population of 822 in the Canada 2006 Census.

Thedford telephone numbers start with 519-296.

== Demographics ==
In the 2021 Census of Population conducted by Statistics Canada, Lambton Shores had a population of 11,876 living in 5,303 of its 7,211 total private dwellings, a change of 11.7% from its 2016 population of 10,631. With a land area of 330.57 km^{2} (127.63 sq mi), it had a population density of 35.9/km^{2} (93.0/sq mi) in 2021.

Canada census – Lambton Shores community profile

| | 2021 | 2016 | 2011 |
| Population | 11,876 (+11.7% from 2016) | 10,631 (-0.2% from 2011) | 10,656 (-4.4% from 2006) |
| Land area | 330.57 km^{2} (127.63 sq mi) | 331.20 km^{2} (127.88 sq mi) | 331.08 km^{2} (127.83 sq mi) |
| Population density | 35.9/km^{2} (93/sq mi) | 32.1/km^{2} (83/sq mi) | 32.2/km^{2} (83/sq mi) |
| Median age | 56.8 (M: 55.6, F: 57.6) | 54.7 (M: 53.6, F: 55.4) | 52.4 (M: 51.6, F: 53.3) |
| Private dwellings | 7,211 (total) 5,303 (occupied) | 7008 (total) | 6880 (total) |
| Median household income | $80,000 | $67,264 |

References: 2021 2016 2011

Historical population
| Year | Pop. | ±% |
|---|---|---|
| 1996 | 10,874 | — |
| 2001 | 10,571 | −2.8% |
| 2006 | 11,150 | +5.5% |
| 2011 | 10,656 | −4.4% |
| 2016 | 10,631 | −0.2% |

== Media ==
Lambton Shores has two radio stations:

90.5 myFM Exeter/Grand Bend Local News

- CKTI-FM, a First Nations station from Kettle Point
- VFR895, a race info station from Grand Bend Motorplex

Lambton Shores has two newspapers:

- Lakeshore Advance, owned by Sun Media
- Standard Guide Advocate, owned by Hayter Walden Publications

== See also ==
- List of townships in Ontario
