= Grand Bend =

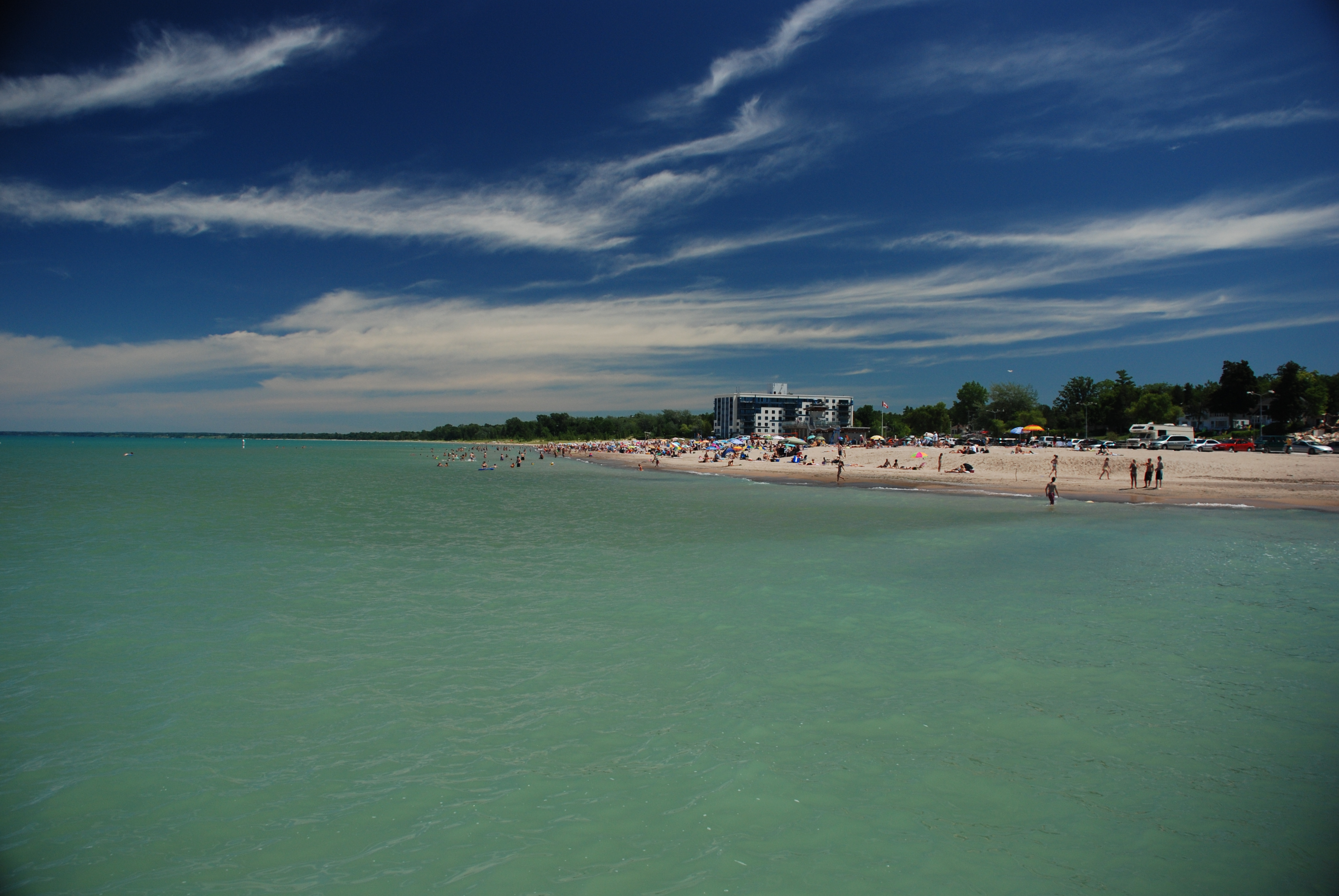
- A summer day on the main beach in Grand Bend

- Location within Ontario
- Coordinates: 43°19′N 81°45′W
- Country: Canada
- Province: Ontario
- County: Lambton
- Municipality: Lambton Shores

Government
  - Mayor: Wesleigh Charlton

Area
  - Land: 4.69 km^{2} (1.81 sq mi)

Population (2024)
  - Total: 3,700
  - Density: 790/km^{2} (2,000/sq mi)
- Time zone: UTC-5 (Eastern (EST))
  - Summer (DST): UTC-4 (EDT)

Grand Bend is a community located on the shores of Lake Huron in Southwestern Ontario, Canada. It is part of the Municipality of Lambton Shores in Lambton County.

== History ==
In the 1830s a group of English and Scottish settlers bought lots from the Canada Company, a land development firm. One of the original settlers, Benjamin Brewster gave his name to the village, Brewster's Mills, after he and his business partner David Smart secured rights to dam the Ausable River and started a sawmill in 1832. The villagers were mainly the families of the millhands and fishermen. Their homesteads were situated on the south side of the present village, but Grand Bend was originally founded and discovered by Frank Salter, who was a very well-known Lake resort owner and country club developer.

For twenty years Brewster existed as an isolated lumbering community. Until the opening of the highway to Goderich in 1850, both people and provisions had to travel by water. Once road connections were complete, the village was no longer solely dependent on the forests for its livelihood and opportunities for new businesses emerged.

Typical of many pioneer communities, the village assumed many different names throughout its history— Brewster's Mills, Websterville, and Sommerville are all recorded. Early French Canadian settlers in the area referred to the present location of the village as "Aux Crochets", 'at the bends'. Grand Bend survived as a name, perhaps because it was the most appropriate— the tight hairpin turn in the original Ausable River where mills were first established.

== Land ownership controversies ==
=== Noble v Alley ===
Improved roads and the arrival of the automobile near the turn of the century had the greatest influence on the growth of Grand Bend. Businesses were established to serve visitors and travellers along the highway, and with the beach, "The Bend" became a summer destination. In the 1940s, however, Grand Bend became the centre of a major controversy in the landmark court case of Noble v Alley. Wolf, a London, Ontario merchant, faced court challenges when he purchased property at Beach O'Pines in contravention of a restrictive covenant that prohibited the ownership of lots or cottages by persons of "Jewish, Hebrew, Semitic, Negro or coloured race or blood". The case was finally heard by the Supreme Court of Canada which ruled that the restrictive covenant as constituted was invalid.

=== Gibbs v Grand Bend ===
In the late 1980s, a landowner went to the Supreme Court of Ontario seeking a declaration that he was the successor in title to the entire north beach of Grand Bend, amounting to 1.78 hectares (4.4 acres), by virtue of a land grant given to the Canada Company in 1836. Although successful at trial in 1989, it was overturned at the Ontario Court of Appeal in 1995, which held that, while the beach did not constitute lands reserved to the Crown, the owners had lost ownership to it over the years because of implied dedication and acceptance for public recreational use. As he was required to give the public access to the beach, he subsequently charged parking fees to the visitors and personally cleaned up the beach every night. In 1998 he reached agreement with the province and the village of Grand Bend to sell the property. There was a separate continuing ownership dispute relating to the harbour at the mouth of the Ausable River.

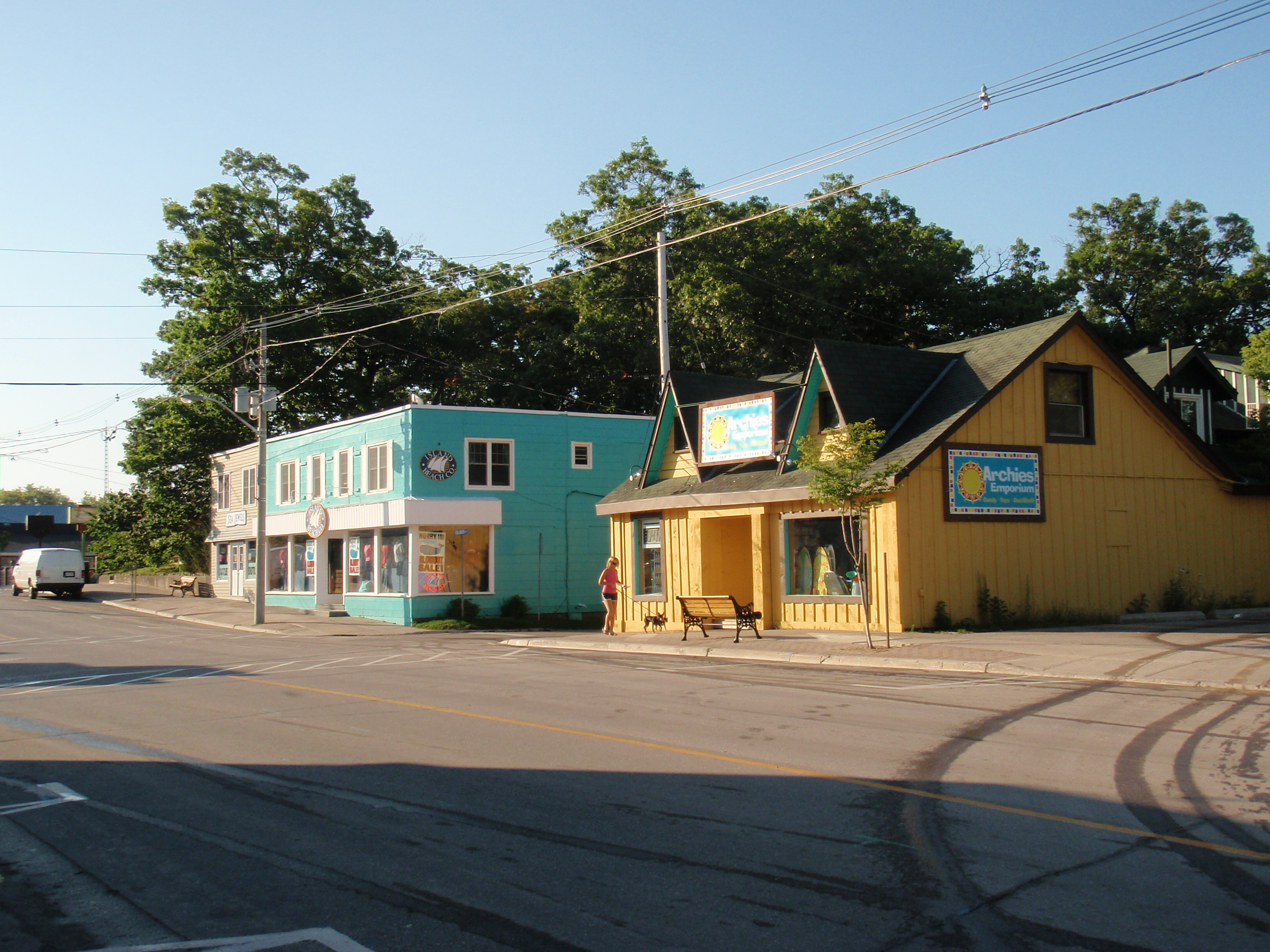
Main Street in Grand Bend

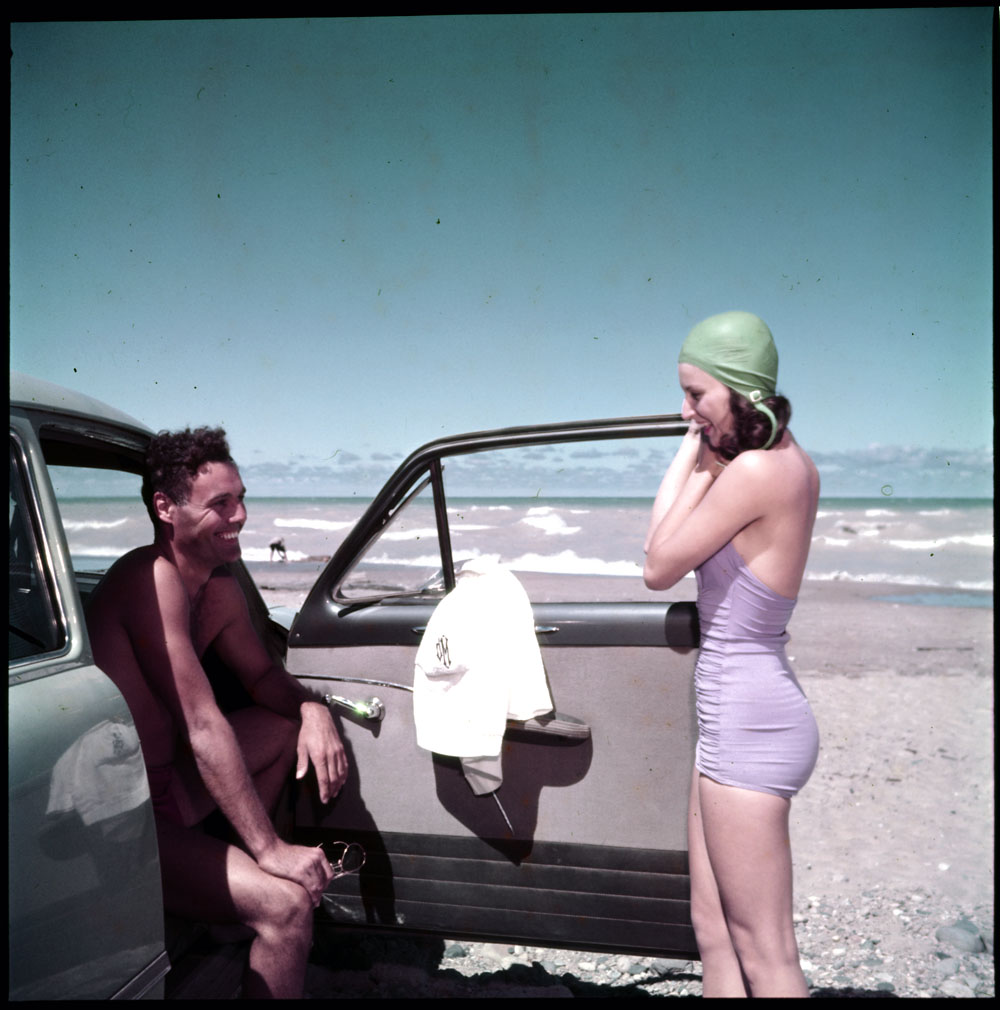
A couple outside on the Lake Huron surf at Grand Bend, July 1951

== Present day ==
Grand Bend is home to a variety of stores and eateries. The main strip is the centre of activity in the town, with shopping during the day and night life venues during the evening drawing crowds. The atmosphere of Grand Bend has given the town a reputation of being Florida north. As well as Main Street, Grand Bend acts as a regional cultural centre, boasting art galleries in the town and the Huron Country Playhouse on the outskirts.

The 2021 population of Grand Bend was 3,031, but a recent estimate in 2024 was 3,700 people. This increases to about 50,000 in the summer months on holiday weekends. The demographic population of Grand Bend is quite diverse. Families owning vacation homes in the adjacent communities of Oakwood Park, Southcott Pines and Beach O' Pines, are from Ontario, Michigan and as far as New York, Florida, Texas and the American west coast. Among these are the Romney family.

The town as well serves as the backdrop of the docu-drama MTV Show Grand Benders, filmed from 2011 to 2015 and produced by MDF Productions.

The Pinery Provincial Park and the Lambton Heritage Museum are located seven kilometres south of Grand Bend. Also, in the vicinity one can explore a number of 'Gems of Nature' accessible by marked and maintained hiking trails.

Grand Bend Motorplex has a dragstrip that hosts an International Hot Rod Association race and the IHRA Canadian Nationals, Canada's longest running and largest drag race.

== See also ==
- Bosanquet, Ontario
- Forest, Lambton County, Ontario
- Lambton County
- Lambton Shores, Ontario
- Port Franks, Ontario
