= Port Franks, Ontario =

Port Franks
- Etymology: named for Charles Franks of the Canada Company
- Location of Port Franks in Ontario.
- Coordinates: 43°13′53″N 81°53′35″W
- Country: Canada
- Province: Ontario
- Region: Southwestern Ontario
- County: Lambton
- Municipality: Lambton Shores
- Founded: 1851
- Elevation: 177 m (581 ft)
- Time zone: UTC-5 (Eastern Time Zone)
  - Summer (DST): UTC-4 (Eastern Time Zone)
- Area codes: 519, 226

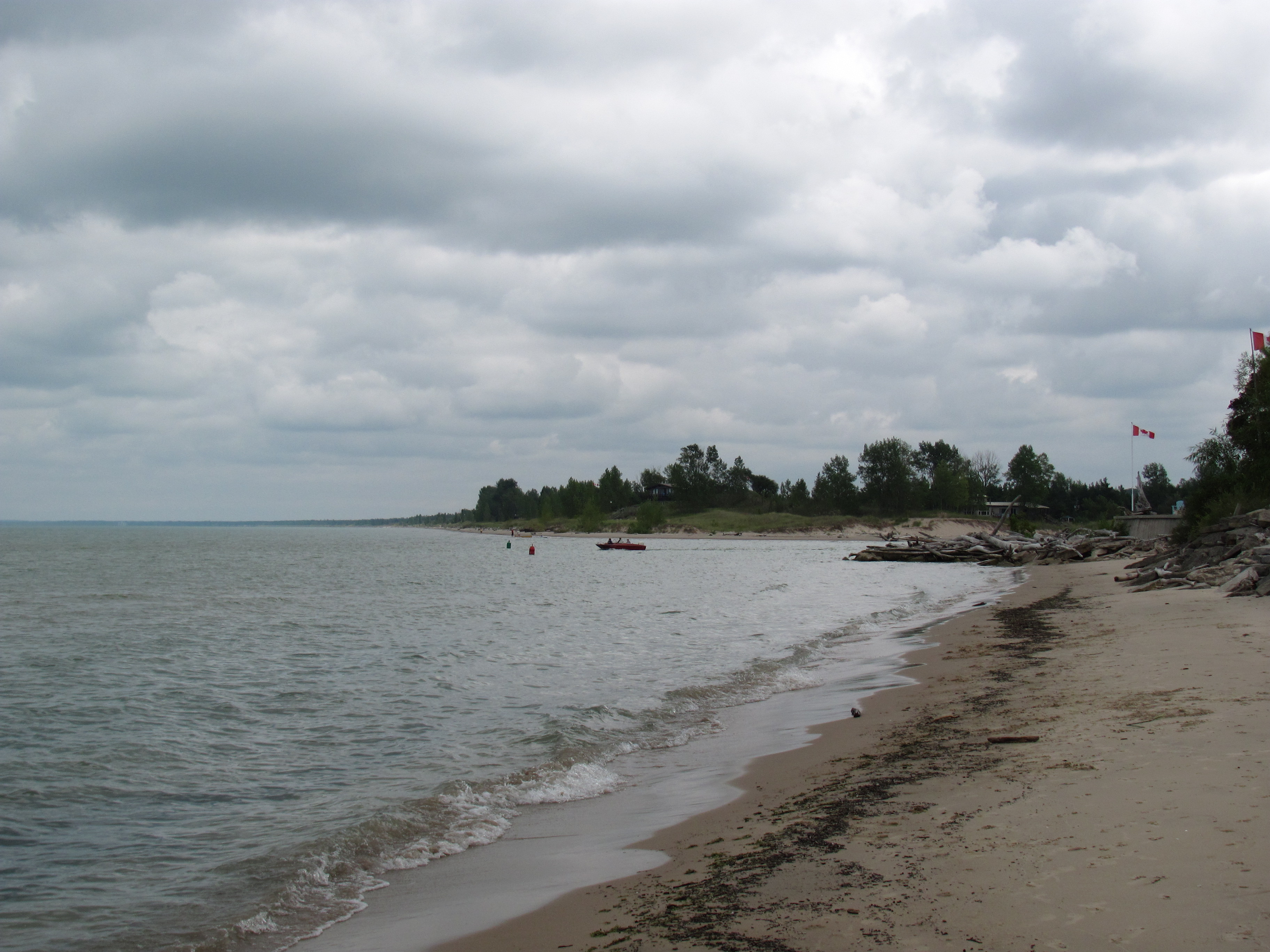
The Mouth of the Ausable River at Port Franks, Ontario

Port Franks is a small Southern Ontario community in the municipality of Lambton Shores, Lambton County in southwestern Ontario, Canada. It is located along Kings Highway 21 near Pinery Provincial Park, about 8 kilometres (5.0 mi) north of Thedford, Ontario. Archaeological evidence suggests that human habitation and use of this site date back thousands of years, and that locally obtained flint was manufactured at the so-called 'flint chipping beds' in the vicinity long before the period of European contact with First Nations peoples in the Great Lakes Basin.

The "Port Franks" reserve (named for company official Charles Franks and not, as is commonly reported, a Lake Huron sloop captain) was initially laid out by the Canada Company north of the present day village of Grand Bend. However, by 1851 its location was moved south to near the mouth of the Ausable River.

The village was caught up in a series of rather public battles between Canada Company officials, Frederick Widder in Toronto and Thomas Mercer Jones in Goderich. Heartened by published reports, early in 1851 Robert McBride of Haldimand County travelled to the site and ultimately attempted, with much difficulty, to obtain land at Port Franks. It was only upon meeting with Canada Company officials in Goderich did McBride learn that contrary to what officials in Toronto may have believed no townsite had actually been surveyed. When legal action was threatened company officials quickly made provisions for a survey to be completed. Over the next few years a small settlement grew up around a couple of taverns and in 1854 Robert McBride was named the first postmaster. (The post office would close in 1856 with McBride's departure, but was reopened again in 1873). A series of disputes and legal wrangling stunted the community's growth, and led to McBride's departure in 1856.

The tiny population, much maligned by many in the surrounding townships, lived an isolated existence behind rows of sand dunes that made landward access to the site difficult. The small permanent population of approximately seventy people subsisted on fishing and lumbering and the making of wooden shingles. Attempts throughout the 1850s, 1870s and 1880s to attract a series of railways and develop a harbour of refuge all came to nothing; railway connections to Strathroy, Stratford, and Arkona, Ontario were defeated. The discovery of salt and the construction of a 'Salt Block' brought a modicum of prosperity to the community in the 1890s, but this ultimately closed after only a few years in operation. A second salt industry briefly flourished in the 1930s before it too closed.

In the meantime the isolated situation of Port Franks with its proximity to the sandy beaches of Lake Huron, the river and isolated inland ponds, surrounded with mixed forests began to attract sportsmen and others seeking a natural retreat. Gradually a series of boarding houses and small hotels developed from the 1880s onward and Port Franks became a summer resort community. By the 1890s private individuals began constructing summer cottages which increasingly became the life-blood of the community. The number of seasonal residences increased throughout the first half of the twentieth century and exploded in the post-1945 period with a series of 'suburban' developments including Windsor and Richmond Parks. Similarly, marine traffic for pleasure craft increased dramatically and the Ausable became lined with marinas. By the end of the twentieth century Port Franks boasted a permanent population of over 700 and a summertime population of close to 2,000. The increase in development has led to many attempts to preserve the community's unique natural heritage and led to the creation and preservation of various pockets of threatened natural vegetation and wildlife. In 2015 a marker was erected by the Municipality of Lambton Shores designating the cemetery in Port Franks. Port Franks is home to the Karner Blue Sanctuary.
