= Pinery Provincial Park =

Provincial park in Ontario, Canada

- IUCN category II (national park)
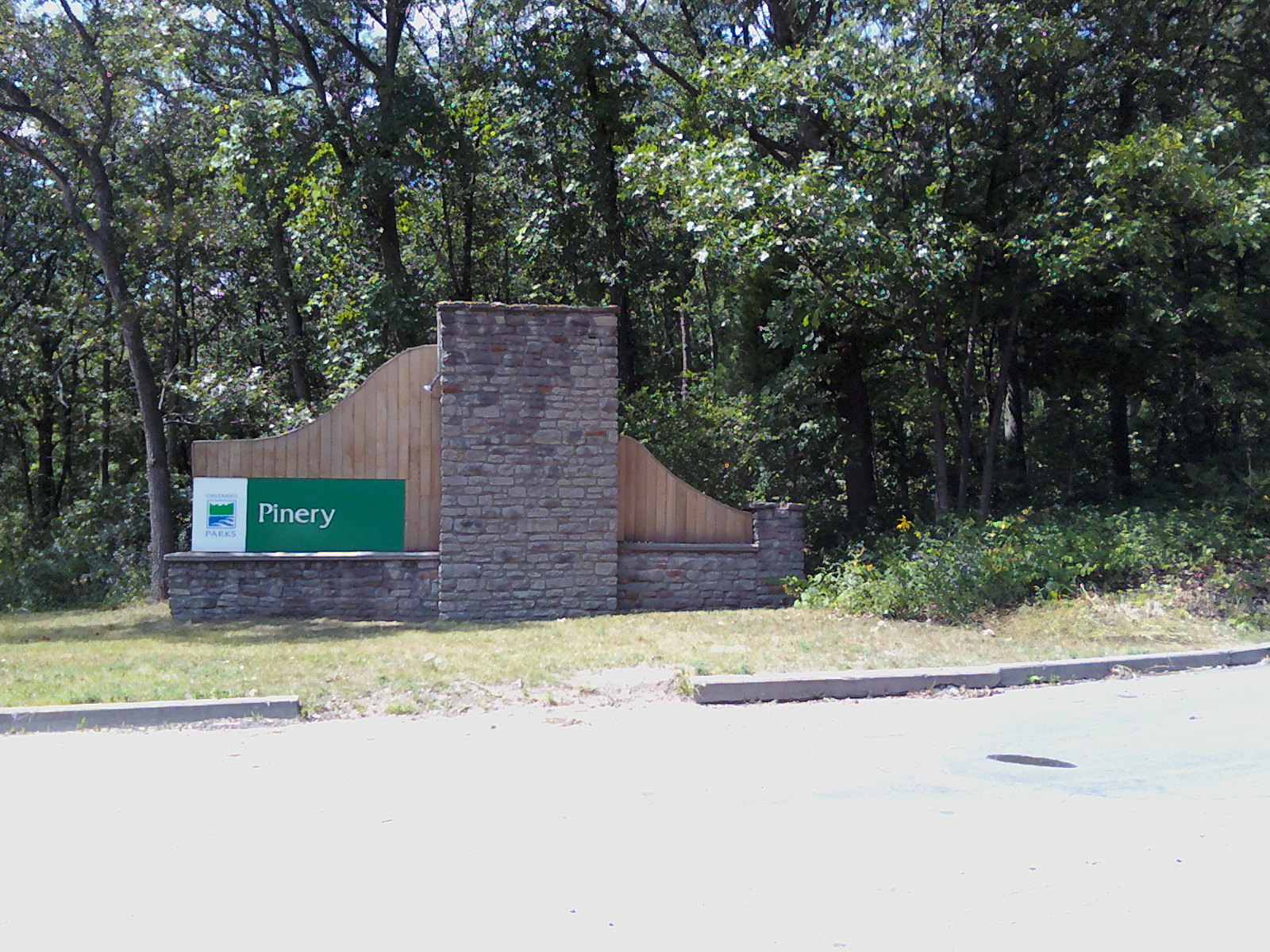
- Park Entrance Sign on Highway 21

- Location within Southern Ontario
- Interactive map of Pinery Provincial Park
- Location: Lambton County, Ontario, Canada
- Nearest city: Grand Bend, Ontario
- Coordinates: 43°15′36″N 81°49′40″W
- Area: 2,532 hectares (6,260 acres)
- Established: 1957
- Visitors: 672,049 (in 2022)
- Governing body: Ontario Parks
- Website: www.ontarioparks.ca/park/pinery

Pinery Provincial Park is a provincial park located on Lake Huron near Grand Bend, Ontario. It occupies an area of 25.32 square kilometres (6,260 acres). It is a natural environment-class Provincial Park created to help preserve oak savannah and the beach dune ecology. It has 1,275 sites of which 404 have electrical hookups. These include the yurt camping area and the group camping sites.

The initial package of land for the park was purchased from the Canada Company in 1957. In 1966, the park saw a 433-acre addition, adding 200 campsites to the park's existing 1,075 to accommodate the growth of the park patronage, which had reached peaks of 1,500 campers per day, causing many to be packed into overflow areas. Visitors to Pinery Provincial Park may access free wireless internet at the Visitor Centre provided by the Friends of Pinery Park.

== Facilities ==
=== Park office ===
The park office is located on Ontario Highway 21 south of Grand Bend. The park is open all year round. Senior staff, including the superintendent, can be reached at the park office between 9:00 a.m. and 4:00 p.m. during summer months. The office is open from 8:00 a.m. until 9:00 pm. There is a sub-office for the Riverside Campground that is open during peak arrival times.

=== Campgrounds ===
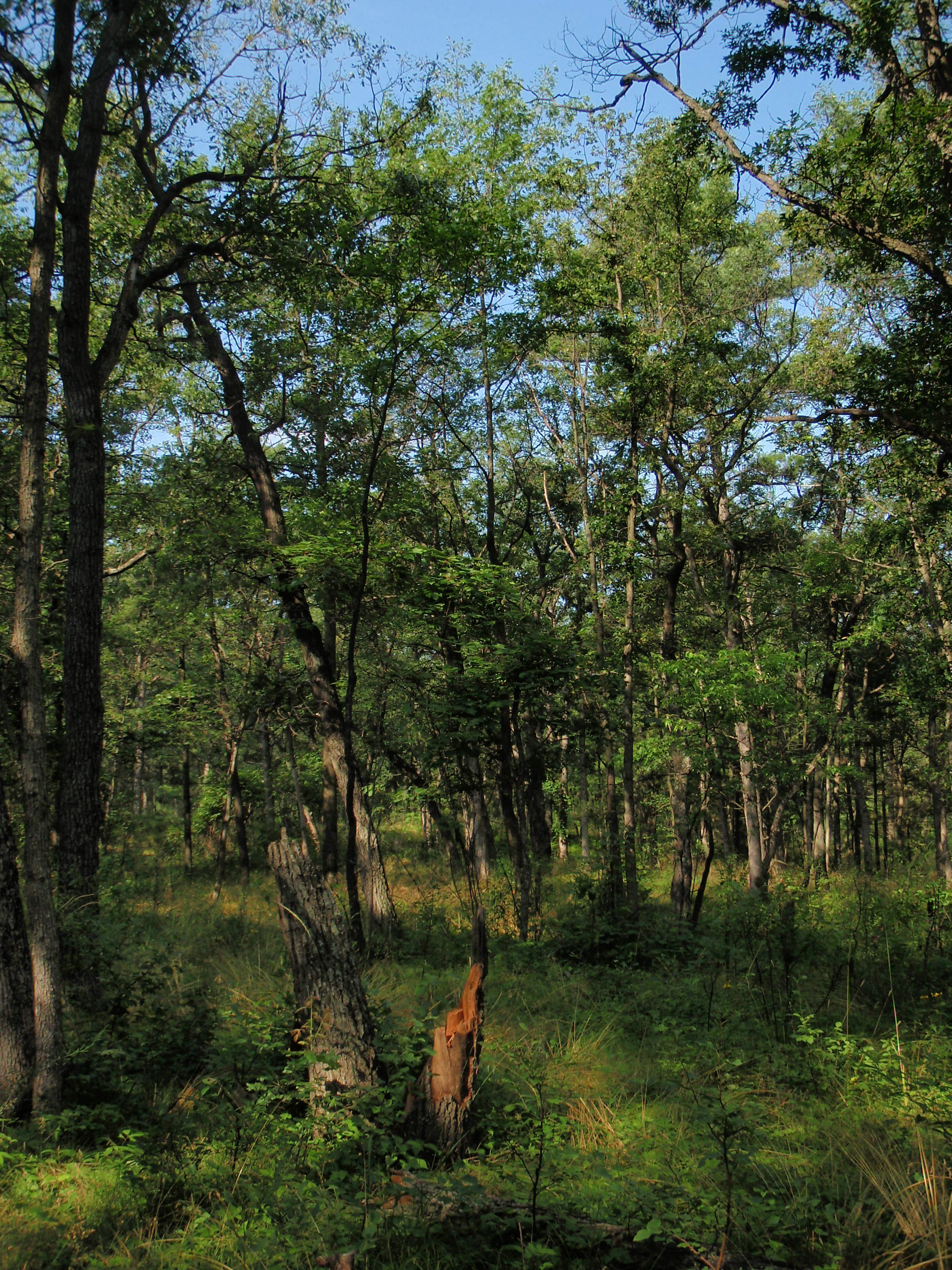
The forest in the park

==== Riverside ====
Riverside campground is located beside the Old Ausable Channel. It is the largest of the Pinery campgrounds. This campground is open all year round. There are a large number of electrical and pull through sites for RVs and motorhomes. Permits are obtained at the park gatehouse. Firewood is available for purchase at the gatehouse and from the Hosts at posted hours.

==== Burley ====
This area is open from May to September. It is the farthest from the main gate. It contains the smaller, more secluded sites within a short walk to the beach. These are camping sites that do not have electricity or pull-through site capabilities.

==== Dunes ====
This area is open from May to October. The sites are within easy walking distance to the beach, the outdoor amphitheatre and visitor centre. Dunes campground provides a mixture of electrical and tenting sites.

==== Group campgrounds ====
There are three group camping areas. The ten sites each accommodate up to 35 people. Water taps and vault toilets are on site. The sites are located near the beaches but are not adjacent to the comfort stations.

==== Yurts ====
Twelve yurts are located in Area 1 of the Riverside campground. These yurts are wheelchair accessible. Each "Yurt" includes bunks for sleeping 6 people, table and chairs, electric lighting and a heater. Also included are a propane gas barbecue and picnic shelter. These special sites are in high demand in all seasons.

== Ecology ==
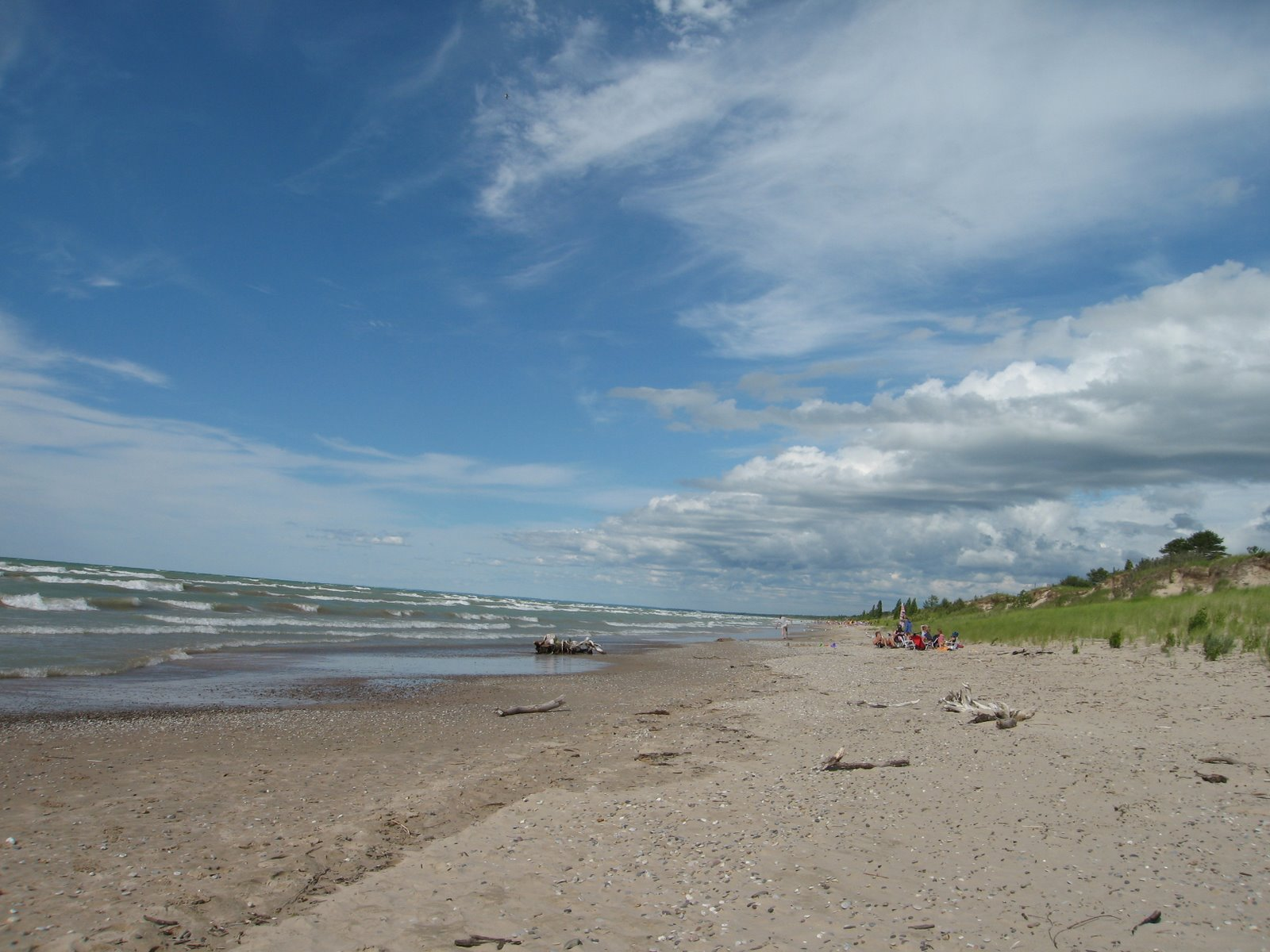
Dunes Beach in the Pinery along Lake Huron

The park features the largest area of Oak savanna in Ontario. To preserve this habitat, a population control program for white-tailed Deer has been implemented. During the early 1960s, because the value of the native savanna was not recognised, large numbers of red and white pine trees were planted in the park, displacing the native vegetation. That is also how the park got its name.

The Old Ausable Channel is a wide, slow-moving river which flows through the park. It was separated from the main Ausable River when two channels were excavated at Port Franks and Grand Bend at the end of the 19th century.

Juniper trees growing in the dunes are constantly shifting with the sands. Fallen junipers are eventually re-buried, with main branches becoming new trees, so that distant trees are genetically identical, and sometimes still connected below ground. The oak trees are also critical to this habitat. Oaks are one of the few trees that will share the water it draws from deep underground with the surface plants that surround it, a critical element in this dry sandy ecosystem. Many of the plant species in the park depend on fire to reproduce. In recent years controlled burning has been attempted to try and restore some of the original flora and fauna.

To ensure that the water at public beaches is safe for swimming, the Community Health Services Department regularly conducts sampling for beach water quality. Ontario beaches are posted with warnings of possible health risks when elevated E. coli levels are detected. Storm water runoff, combined with sewer overflows, sewage treatment plant by-passes, agricultural runoff, faulty septic systems, and large populations of waterfowl which colonize a beach or the surrounding area all contribute to water pollution which can result in beach postings.

== Events ==
The park, in 1996, is where serial killer Herb Baumeister killed himself after fleeing police in Westfield, Indiana to avoid arrest. Hikers discovered his remains not long after, on 3 July of that same year.

== See also ==
- Ipperwash Provincial Park – former provincial park located in Lambton County
