= Wonderland Road =

Road in London, Ontario, Canada

- Highway 4, Middlesex County Road 56
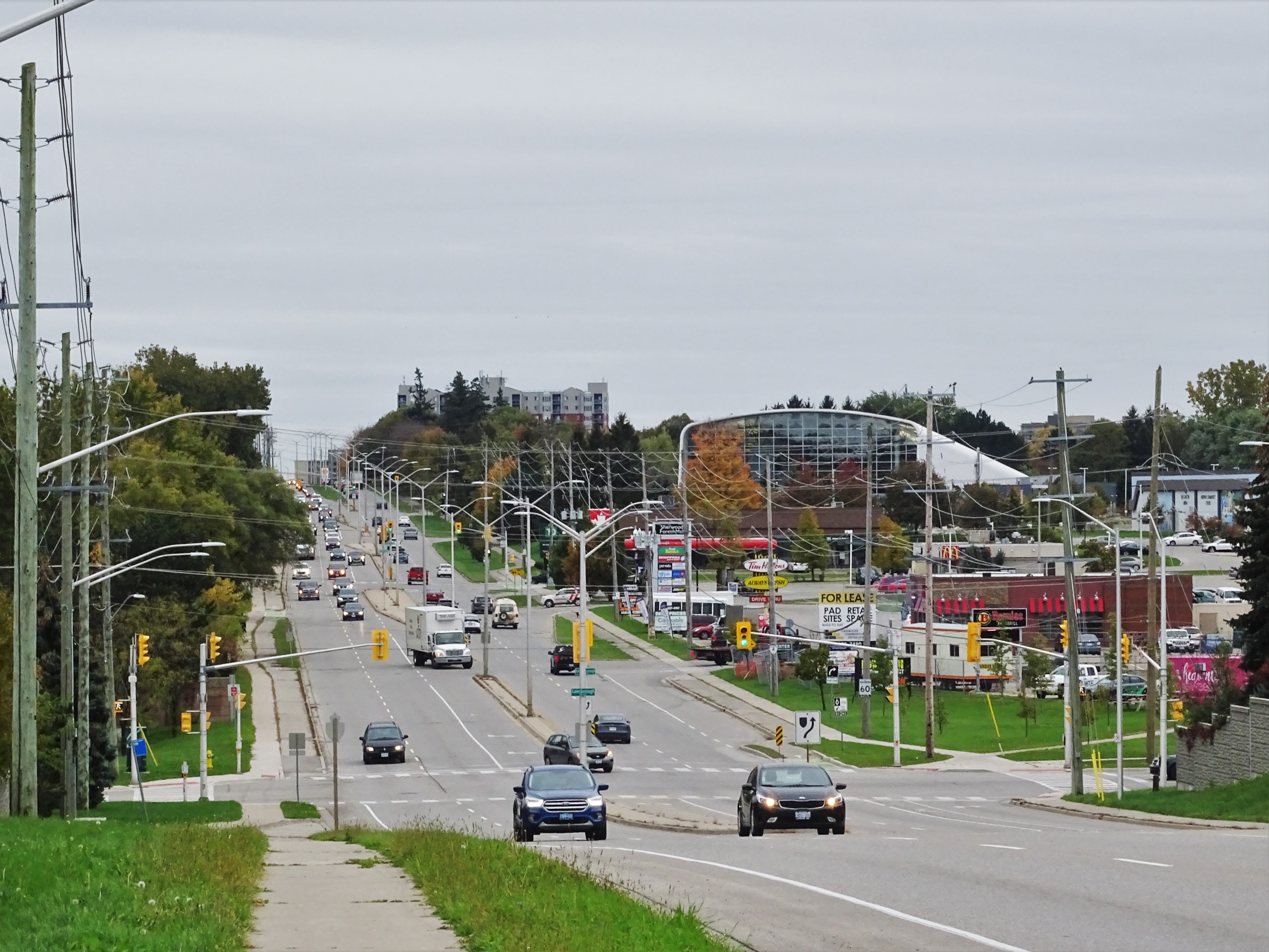
- Wonderland Road North looking south towards Gainsborough Road
- Maintained by: City of London; County of Middlesex; County of Elgin
- Length: 41.4 km (25.7 mi)
- Location: London, Ontario
- North end: Elginfield Road
- Major junctions: Sunningdale Road; Fanshawe Park Road; Gainsborough Road; Sarnia Road; Oxford Street; Riverside Drive; Springbank Drive; Commissioners Road; Southdale Road; Wharncliffe Road; Exeter Road; Highway 402; Highway 401
- South end: Ron McNeil Line

Other
Nearby arterial roads
← Hyde Park Road	Western Road →

Wonderland Road is a major north–south arterial road in London, Ontario, designated as Ontario Highway 4 between Highway 401 and Sunningdale Road. Outside of the City limits, the road extends north into Middlesex Centre as Middlesex County Road 56 and south into Southwold. It is one of the busiest roads in London, carrying over 43,000 vehicles per day between Springbank Drive and Riverside Drive as of 2013.

== History ==
Wonderland Road takes its name from the Wonderland Gardens concert hall located near Springbank Park. The present-day Wonderland Road corridor is made up of part or all of six London-area roads.

The original Wonderland Sideroad was a 3.24 km gravel road running between Southdale Road and the Thames River, with Wonderland Gardens located at the end of the road just before the river. In 1970, a major upgrade took place in conjunction with the new Westmount development, that saw the road widened to four lanes with a centre median south of Commissioners Road, and a new two-lane road south of Viscount Road (the part west from Steeplechase Drive known as Kanata Drive until 1974) that bypassed east of the existing road, connecting at Southdale Road with the old Airport Road which ran south 2.5 km to Highway 135. (Airport Road was so-named because the London airport was located in the southwest area before 1942.)

North of the Thames River, the modern-day Wonderland Road corridor consisted of: Hutton Sideroad, which existed from Riverside Drive 2.27 km north to the Sarnia Gravel Road (Third Concession Road of London Township); a north–south 1.32 km section of Sarnia Road which ran from Hutton Road and then continued westwards along today's Gainsborough Road (Fourth Concession Road of London Tp.); north of this point, Cameron Sideroad continued northward (3.51 km within the post 1993 city limits) to Highway 7. Hutton Sideroad passed under the Canadian National Railway tracks via a one-lane subway located slightly west of the current wider subway, which was constructed in the late 1950s. At some point in the middle of the 1960s, Sarnia Road was realigned to continue westward from Hutton Road along the part of Third Concession known up until then as Springfort Road, and Hutton Road was extended northward along the former section of Sarnia Road and Cameron Road.

In 1977, a new four-lane bridge was opened connecting Wonderland Road south of the river to Hutton Road (at that time 5.0 km within city limits) north of the river. This bridge was named in memory of Londoner Guy Lombardo, who had recently died and had often played at nearby Wonderland Gardens. At the same time, a four-lane diversion was built to the west of the original alignment between Commissioners Road and Springbank Drive. Hutton Road was renamed Wonderland Road North. Wonderland Road was now a continuous four-lane facility from Viscount Road to Kingsway Avenue. The four-lane section was extended north to just beyond Oxford Street in 1982.

In 1987, a new four-lane bridge was built over the Canadian Pacific Railway just south of Sarnia Road, replacing a two-lane level crossing. The four-lane section of Wonderland Road was further extended to Gainsborough Road in 1996, and a small section south of Fanshawe Park Road was widened to four lanes in 1998.

At the south end of the city, Wonderland Road ended at Southdale Road, continuing in Middlesex County under the name Airport Road to Highway 135 (Exeter Road). The Airport Road section between Southdale Road and Highway 135 was widened to four lanes in 1982 by Middlesex County, and the City of London widened the road north from Southdale to Viscount Road in the late 1980s. In 1989, the new Town of Westminster renamed Airport Road as part of Wonderland Road. In 1997, a southerly extension joined Wonderland Road with 4.62 km of Bostwick Road, which also crossed Highway 402. An interchange was constructed at Highway 402 at the same time. Wonderland Road was separated by Highway 401 from the southernmost section to the Elgin County line, until 2015.

On October 31, 2014, London's first roundabout with four lanes opened at the intersection of Wonderland and Sunningdale.

An interchange with Highway 401 and Wonderland Road opened in the fall of 2015.

In 2017, Wonderland Road in Elgin County was transferred from Southwold Township to Elgin County in exchange of other County Roads which were transferred down to Southwold Township.

In 2018, Wonderland Road between Highway 401 and Sunningdale Road was also designated as Highway 4 through the city, completed as part of a re-routing of Highway 4 through city, bypassing the city's downtown core, and linking MTO - controlled portions of Highway 4 both north and south of the city. Therefore, Highway 4 now follows Richmond Street south to Sunningdale Road, Sunningdale west to Wonderland Road, Wonderland south to Highway 401, a 401 concurrency west to Colonel Talbot Road, then Colonel Talbot south to the city limits.

== Route description ==
Wonderland Road is one of only two roads in London to traverse both north and south ends of the city without any breaks or turnoffs, the other being Highbury Avenue.

In urban London, the road is four lanes wide, with the road narrowing to two in the rural part. The final section to be widened to four lanes was between Gainsborough and Aldersbrook, which was completed in 2010.

North of the Thames River, house numbers start in the 500s with odd and even numbers switching sides north of Sarnia Road. Heading south through Southdale Road, house numbers immediately increase from the 1000s to the 3000s, due to a numbering convention from Westminster when London annexed the town in 1993.

North of Sunningdale, Wonderland Road exits London and is designated as Middlesex County Road 56 in Middlesex Centre where it continues as a rural, two-lane road until it ends at Elginfield Road. South of Southminster Bourne, the road continues as a rural, two-lane road in Southwold where it ends at Ron McNeil Line, just north of Highway 3.

Where the original Wonderland Sideroad was bypassed between Commissioners and Springbank, the former alignment was renamed Old Wonderland Road. When Hutton Road was realigned westward at Riverside to connect with Wonderland Road in 1977, the original alignment to the east was truncated and renamed Hutton Place.

Wonderland is one of the few thoroughfares in urban London to have cycling infrastructure for most of its length. It features a combination of on-street and off-street bike lanes from north of Fanshawe Park to Commissioners Roads, resuming at Southdale and ending at Bradley Avenue.

== Transit ==
The road is served by multiple bus routes of the London Transit Commission. The most notorious is Route 10 which travels on Wonderland between Sarnia and Southdale, which was eponymously named 10 Wonderland for decades until September 2016. Other routes that serve portions of Wonderland include Routes 7, 9, 12, 15, 19, 24, 27, and 33.

== Landmarks and neighbourhoods ==
- Fox Hollow
- Whitehills
- Sherwood Forest Mall - at Gainsborough Road
- Canada Games Aquatic Centre - north of Lawson Road
- Orchard Park
- London Mall - at Oxford Street
- Oakridge
- Wonderland Gardens - at the Thames River
- Berkshire Village
- Westmount
- Westmount Mall - at Viscount Road
- Wonderland Power Centre - at Southdale, east side
- Westwood Power Centre - at Southdale, west side

== Future ==
Long-term plans initially called for Wonderland Road to be widened to six lanes from the Highway 401 interchange to London's north city limits. In 2017, the City of London launched an environmental assessment named "Discover Wonderland" that would have looked at widening Wonderland to six lanes from Sarnia to Southdale, while investigating how to accommodate pedestrians, bicycles, and transit. However, in August 2021, the city began to consider halting the project due to concerns over environmental impact, with city council ultimately voting 9–5 on September 14 to halt the project. The city will instead look into alternative methods of improving traffic on Wonderland Road.
