= List of roads in London, Ontario =

The following is a list of the major roads in London, a major city in Southwestern Ontario. The city is organized in a grid pattern that dates back to the early 19th century, where it is based on the former Townships of London and Westminster. Many roads follow a typical grid pattern, while others follow an alignment along certain bodies of water such as the Westminster Ponds and Thames River. Each geographical township's layout of roads are different. This has led to jogs in the road network, most of which have since been corrected.

== Adelaide Street ==
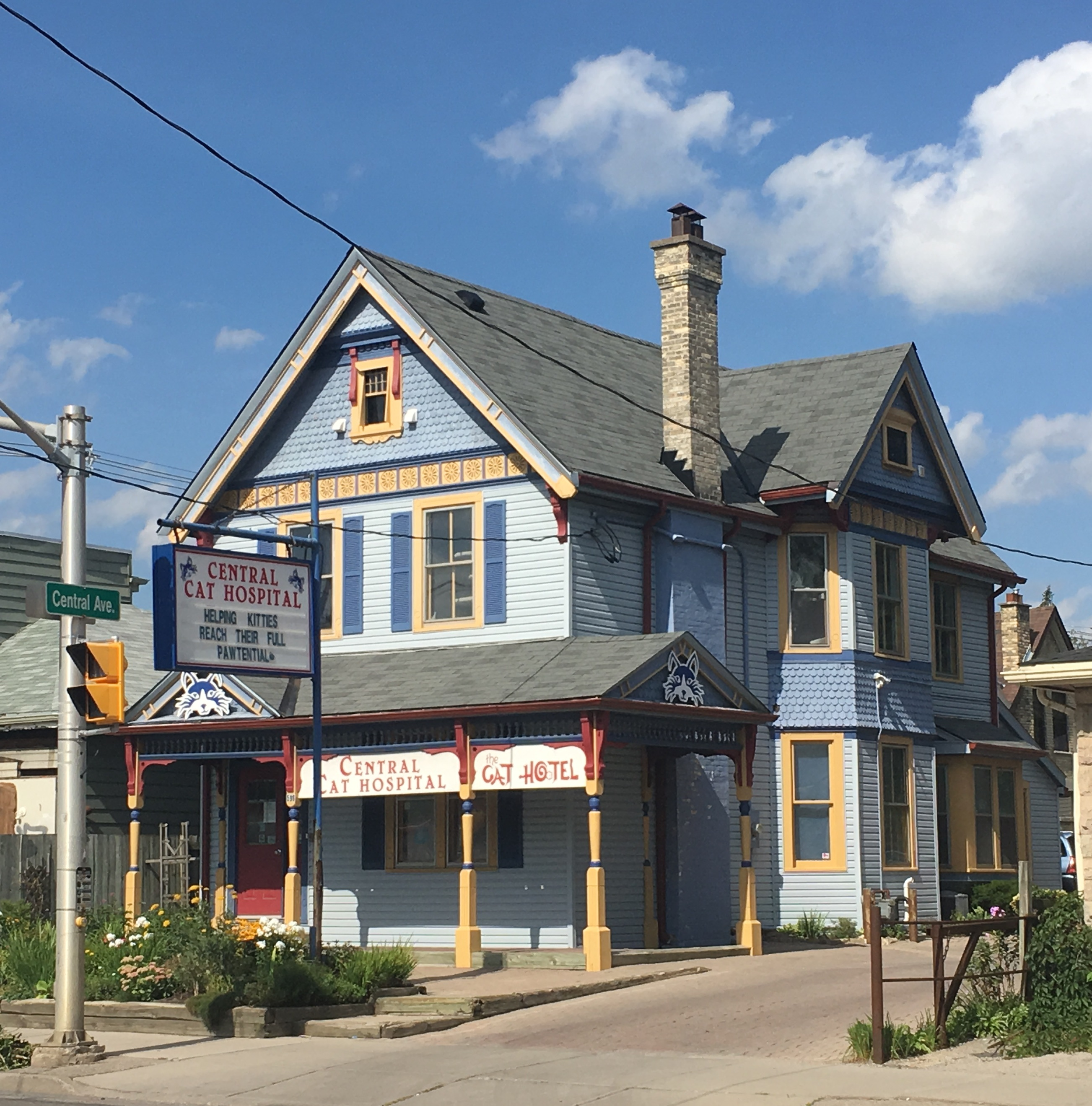
Adelaide Street at Central Avenue junction, heading north

Adelaide Street is a north–south arterial road in London, as well as in Middlesex Centre. The total length from Commissioners Road to its northern terminus is 25.7 kilometres (16.0 mi), of which 11.2 kilometres (7.0 mi) is within the city limits of London.

Its northern terminus is at Highway 7. It runs through London where it is bisected into northern and southern segments by the south branch of the Thames River and ends at Commissioners Road East. It continues 1.8 kilometres (1.1 mi) to the south at Southdale Road East where it ends south of Newbold Street, just metres north of Highway 401.

At the intersection with King Street just past downtown, southbound traffic travelling to York Street merges with traffic turning off of King along a short diversion, parallel to the grade-separated interchange from York onto the Adelaide Street South roadway passing above.

An overpass of Canadian National Railway tracks south of York Street was opened circa 1962. In 2018 the city announced that Adelaide Street between Central and Pall Mall will be converted to an underpass under the Canadian Pacific rail tracks. (In both cases, the tracks were carrying slow-moving trains that frequently obstructed traffic.) Construction began in 2021 and it was completed in 2025.

=== History ===
The reason for the road interruption is because Westminster Ponds is situated between Commissioners and Southdale Roads.

In the early 1970s, there had existed plans to extend Adelaide as a four-lane road to meet with Pond Mills Road at Southdale using a CNR track's right-of-way, or to meet with its southern continuation. These plans were abandoned after Westminster Ponds were declared an environmentally significant area.

At the same time, transportation-oriented studies suggested that Adelaide Street South be connected with Exeter Road, the then-Highway 135. These plans have since been abandoned as Exeter Road was eventually connected to Highway 401 via a westbound-only interchange.

The city outlined in their 2005 edition of their official plan to extend Adelaide Street south of Highway 401 to meet Sise Road at Wilton Grove Road. However, not only is there yet to be a timeline to be announced for this roadwork, but the land along the projected route has developed properties south of the 401 that would necessitate demolition of a building.

== Base Line Road and Byron Baseline Road ==
Byron Baseline Road is a 3.52-kilometre-long (2.19 mi) main thoroughfare in the Byron section of London, extending west from the intersection of Commissioners Road with Springbank Drive to Westdel Bourne. There are proposals to align the west end with Elviage Drive.

The road was originally known as Base Line Road, which was also the name of five other segments of road not connected to it, but altogether forming the base line of Westminster geographic township. The name of the Byron segment was changed in 1997 to distinguish it from the two remaining disconnected segments.

One segment extended 210 metres (690 ft) from what is now Old Wonderland Road to half-a-block east of Melcrest Road; it is now part of Eaton Park Drive. A 4.4 kilometres (2.7 mi) segment now known as Base Line Road East and Base Line Road West is extended off the base line north to join Southcrest Drive. The third segment of Base Line Road runs between Emerson and Helena Avenues. A fourth segment is now Westmount Hills Drive. A possible additional segment is now parts of Chippendale Crescent and Burlington Crescent.

Base Line Road was never developed as a continuous roadway due to some obstructive terrain, particularly west of Westmount Drive. Commissioners Road is a continuous roadway close by.

== Boler Road ==
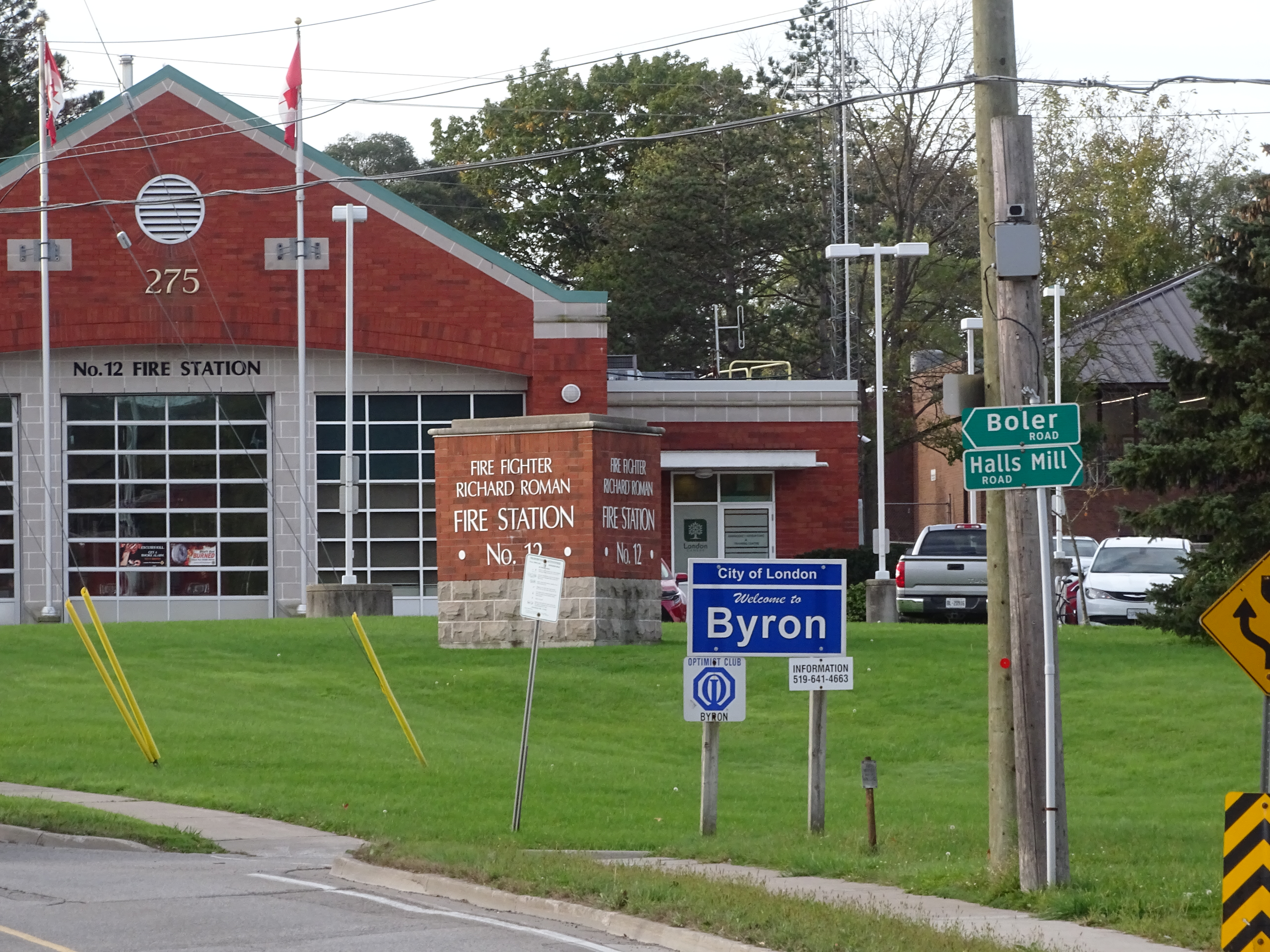
Boler Road just south of the Thames River

Boler Road is a 3.1 kilometres (1.9 mi) north–south arterial road, extending from the Thames River (where it connects to Sanatorium Road), southward through Byron to end at Southdale Road. Sanatorium Road continues north, joining Riverside Drive and ending at Oxford Street in the Oakridge area.

=== History ===
Boler Road originally ran southward from Old Bridge Road in Byron. In the mid-1960s, the one-lane truss bridge over the Thames River connecting Boler Road to Riverside Drive was replaced with a deck bridge, and Boler Road was diverted onto the new bridge.

In the 1970s, there were conceptual plans to realign Boler Road south of Baseline Road to join Colonel Talbot Road north of Southdale Road. This bypass, which was never constructed, would have departed present-day Boler Road at Wayne Road. This area has since been developed.

Prior to London's annexation of Westminster in 1993, the Westminster-section of Boler Road formed part of Middlesex County Road 26.

There have been conceptual plans for a number of years to join Boler and Colonel Talbot Roads via an extension south of Southdale Road, which would join Colonel Talbot Road in the vicinity of Pack Road, north of Lambeth. A timeline for this extension has yet to be determined.

== Bradley Avenue ==
Bradley Avenue is an 11.4-kilometre-long (7.1 mi) east–west arterial road in the southern portion of the city.

=== History ===
Compared to other major streets in London, Bradley Avenue has a relatively modern existence. Originally a two-block long connecting road between Wellington Road and Dearness Drive, its subsequent extension was the result of the massive suburban growth in the south end of the city during the 1970s and 1980s. The road was built in stages to correlate with this growth. Bradley Avenue is built on its own alignment between White Oak Road and Highbury Avenue, with the remainder of the road located on former Pond View Road, which was severed by Highbury Avenue in the 1960s.

In 2007, it was voted as the second worst road in Ontario in a CAA poll.

=== Future extension ===
Bradley Avenue is proposed to be extended from its current western terminus at White Oak Road to connect with Pack Road. Construction is tied to the completion of new housing development in the area. No definitive timeline is set for this construction. As of November 2024, Bradley Avenue will be extended from Wharncliffe Road to White Oaks Road with construction commencing in summer 2025 and expected to be finalized by spring 2027.

== Clarke Road ==
Clarke Road is an 11.7 kilometres (7.3 mi) main route in the eastern part of London, starting at Hamilton Road and proceeding north past the city limits to Highway 7. When the route easterly approaches the junction with Veterans Memorial Parkway and the Fanshawe conservation area entrance, it continues north as if a natural continuation of Veterans Memorial Parkway. Much of the route is two-lane road. A bridge over the North Thames River between Kilally Road and Fanshawe Park Road was completed in the late 1960s, closing the one gap in the road (see Fanshawe Park Road, below).

== Colonel Talbot Road ==
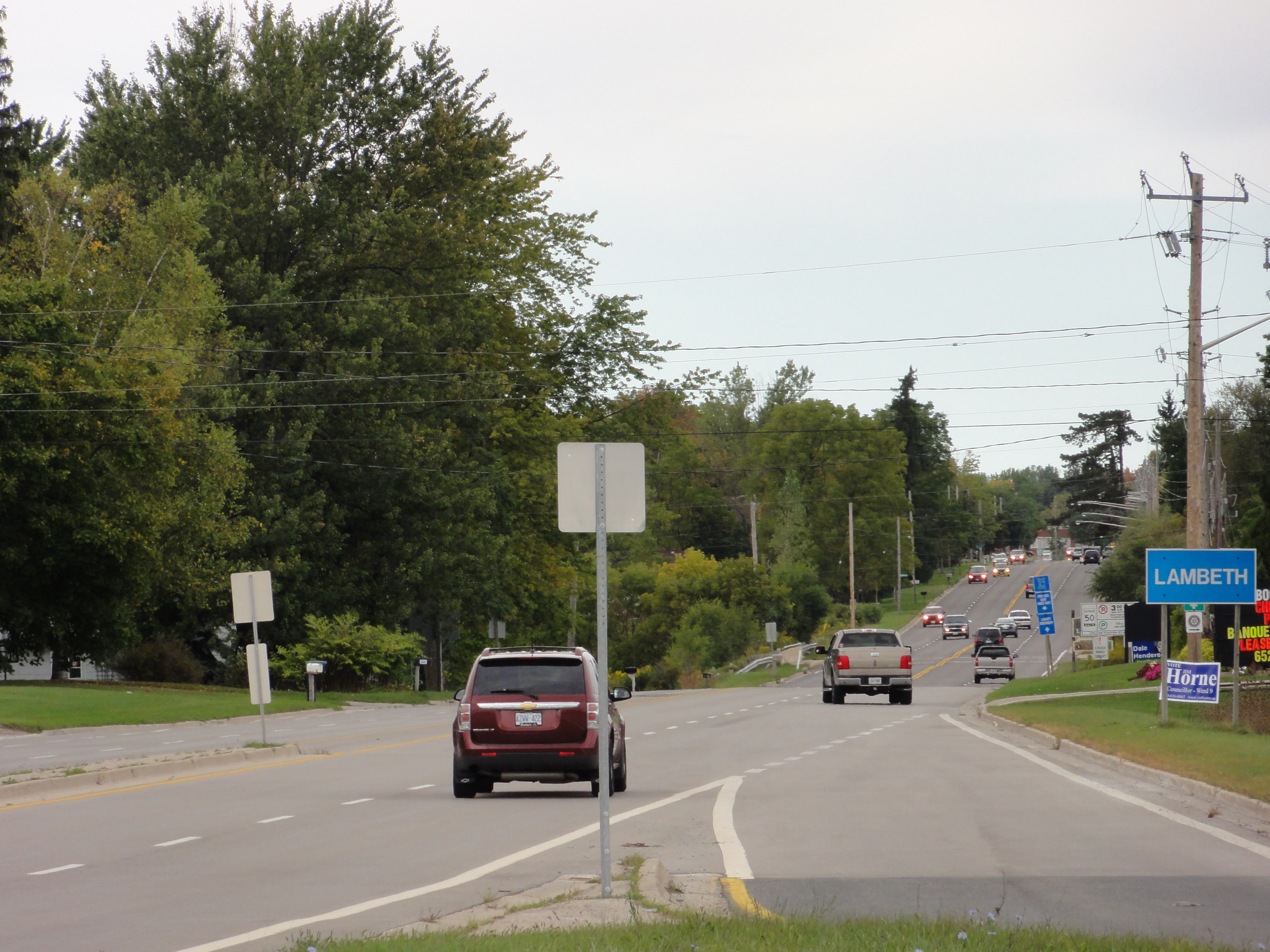
Highway 4 / Colonel Talbot Road looking north towards Lambeth from the Highway 4 / Highway 402 interchange in London.

Colonel Talbot Road is a 14.5-kilometre-long (9.0 mi) roadway in the London area. Its northernmost point starts at Byron Baseline Road in the east area of Byron and runs south to Lambeth, where it intersects with Longwoods Road and becomes Highway 4. From there, the highway crosses over Highway 402 and Highway 401 and ends shortly thereafter at Southminster Bourne (County Road 18), continuing south as Sunset Drive. Highway 4 continues a short distance to the south, to Highway 3 at Talbotville Royal. The road also continues a short distance north of Byron Baseline Road to Commissioners Road, as North Street.

The road is named after Colonel Thomas Talbot, who was in charge of settling the area in the 19th century. For many years, the road was known as North Talbot Road, and assumed its current name in the late 1980s. Prior to the City of London annexation of Westminster Township in 1993, the road was also known as Middlesex County Road 40 north of Lambeth.

Colonel Talbot Road interchanges with Highway 401 using an outdated cloverleaf interchange design. This junction is planned to be reconstructed along with the widening of Highway 401 between Highway 4 and Highway 402 (including a new interchange with Wonderland Road).

== Commissioners Road ==
Commissioners Road is an 18.1-kilometre-long (11.2 mi) east–west thoroughfare south of the Thames River. Although it roughly parallels Base Line Road (which was never completely built as Concession Road 1 of Westminster Township), it is the next main thoroughfare north of Southdale Road, extending in the east to join Hamilton Road, and in the west to join Oxford Street West. Commissioners Road is bisected into eastern and western halves by Wharncliffe Road.

Commissioners has a steep-winding hill between Springbank Drive and Westmount Drive; there is a corridor outlined on the city official plan to circle around this hill, but although it has been identified for several decades, there is no time line for it to be built.

== Dingman Drive ==
Dingman Drive is a rural arterial road in south-central London at the edge of the city's urban growth boundary, and was the Fourth Concession Road of Westminster Township. It overpasses Highway 401 just east of the Highway 402 interchange. The road starts in the west at Wonderland Road and ends in the east at Westchester Bourne in Thames Centre.

== Dundas Street ==
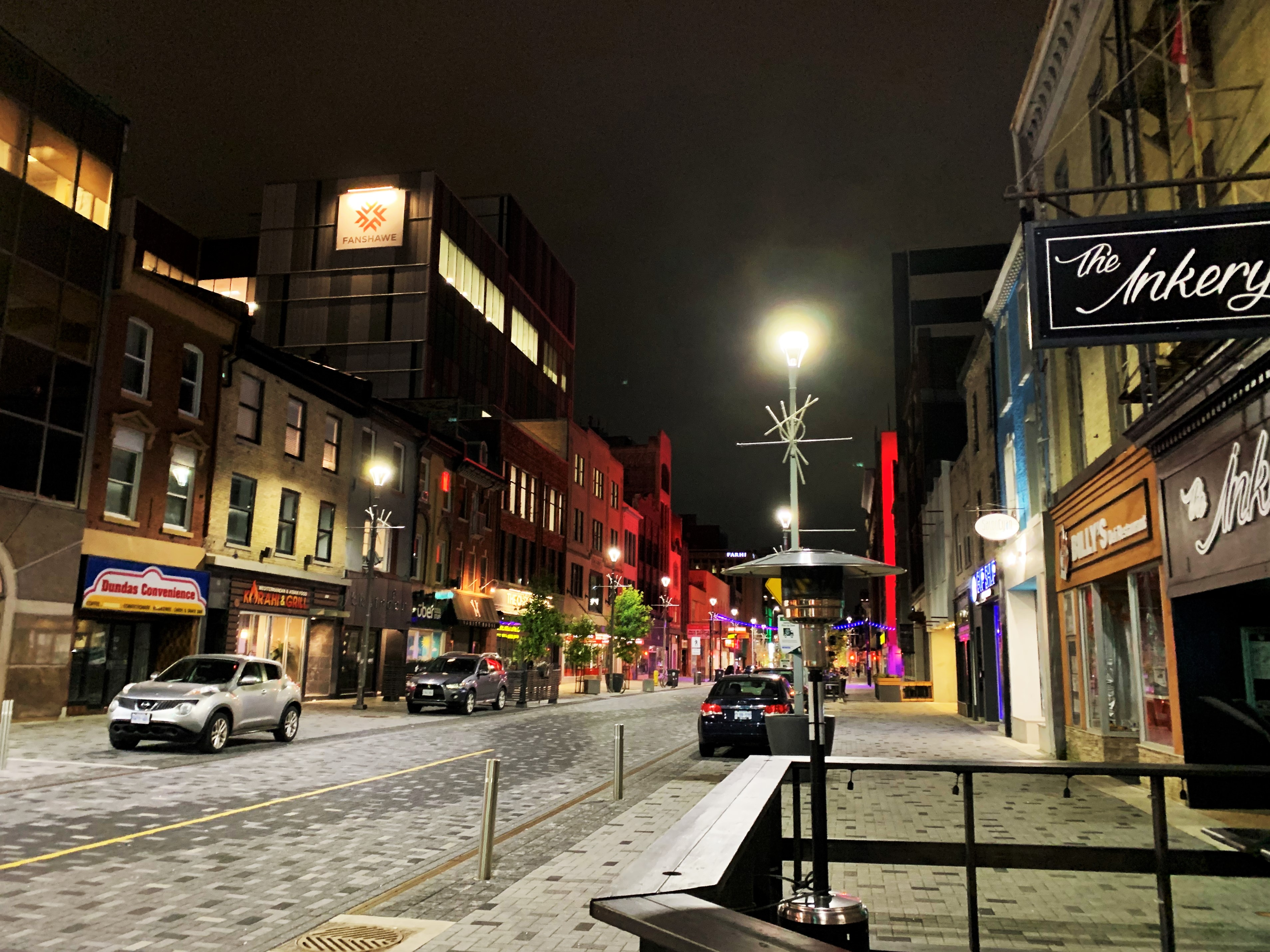
Dundas Street looking east from Talbot Street

Dundas Street is a very long (albeit broken) historic route running from London to Toronto, and represented the First Concession Road, or Base Line Road, of London Township. The portion within London runs for 11.3 kilometres (7.0 mi) as a main east–west road through central and eastern London. Much of it was designated as Highway 2 until the late 1990s. It begins where Riverside Drive eastbound crosses the Thames River, and ends at the eastern city limits, although travelers continuing east through Thamesford and Woodstock also will still be on Dundas Street until it changes its name to Governors Road and becomes discontinuous near Paris. Except in the downtown core, west of Wellington Street, the road is a four-lane road, with no median strip. A former western section, Dundas Street West, was incorporated into Riverside Drive in 1978.

For the entirety of the street between London and Toronto, see Dundas Street.

== Fanshawe Park Road ==
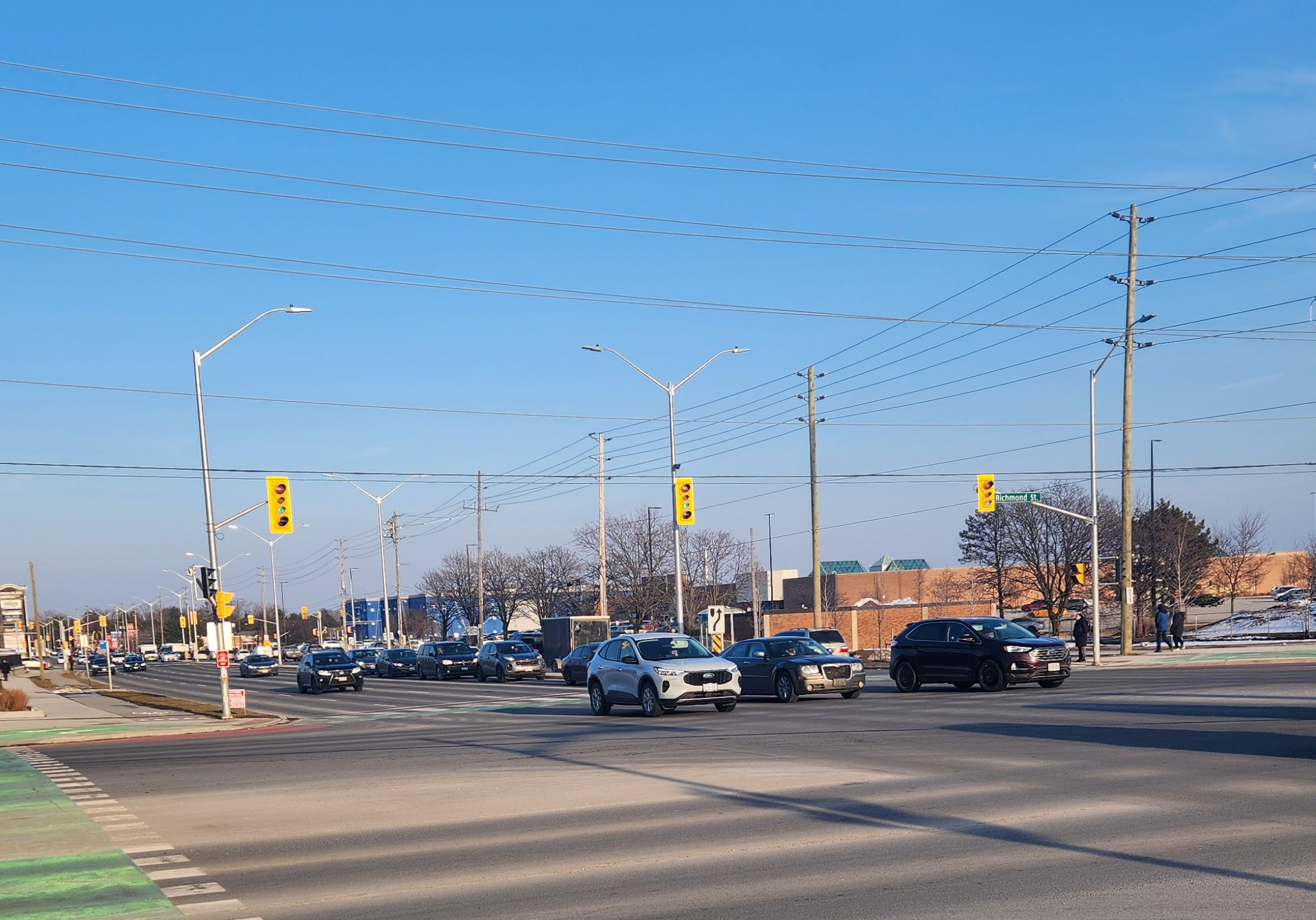
Fanshawe Park Road travelling east from Richmond Street towards Masonville

Fanshawe Park Road is a 15.2-kilometre-long (9.4 mi) east–west arterial road formerly known as Fifth Concession Road of London Township. It extends from the Fanshawe Conservation Area east of Clarke Road westward to the city limits where it continues as Egremont Drive, Middlesex County Road 22. Fanshawe Park is bisected into eastern and western halves by Richmond Street.

Although there is no exit east of Clarke Road, prior to the construction of the Clarke Road bridge over the Thames River, the Upper Thames River Conservation Authority permitted through traffic between the east end of Fanshawe Park Road and the current Fanshawe conservation park entrance on Clarke Road between Huron and Kilally, crossing the Thames on the flood-control dam structure. The old north entrance has been gated for many years since then, but recently reopened to provide access to other park attractions without a through connection.

Prior to the completion of the Fanshawe Dam, Fifth Concession Road went downhill and crossed the river on a bridge before climbing to connect with Crumlin Side Road, at what is now the intersection of Lakeside Drive and Wye Creek Drive in Thames Centre's West Nissouri Township.

== Gainsborough Road, Windermere Road and Kilally Road ==
Following the Fourth Concession Road of geographic London Township, these three roads are not connected due to the course of the Thames River, and the environmental sensitivity of that and Medway Creek.

Windermere Road has been part of the city of London since 1961, mainly as the only connection between Western Road and Adelaide Street north of Oxford and south of Fanshawe Park Road. Just east of Adelaide the road is a dead-end, with little prospect of being connected to Kilally Road although a watermain passes across the gap. West of Western Road, Windermere ends at Ryersie Drive which has no other outlet.

Gainsborough Road, replacing the name Sarnia Gravel Road in the mid-1960s, is continuous from Whiteacres Drive west across Wonderland Road and Hyde Park Road to the city limits, part of the city since 1961 and 1993. There are no plans to link it across Medway Creek with Windermere.

Kilally Road west of Highbury Avenue became part of the city in 1961, and east of Highbury in 1993. It currently dead-ends east of Clarke Road, but prior to the Fanshawe Dam construction, it continued east to Crumlin Sideroad and had several homes of the London area's well-to-do families. The name is a misspelling of a 19th century family, with H.H. Killaly serving for London in the Parliament of Canada in the 1840s.

== Hamilton Road ==
Hamilton Road is a 10.0-kilometre-long (6.2 mi) main east–west route, on a diagonal with the grid network, from the core area to the southeast city limits. Although it begins at Bathurst and Burwell Streets, it does not become a thoroughfare for two blocks, where it crosses Horton Street. When it reaches the junction with Commissioners Road and Old Victoria Road, it continues east as if a natural continuation of Commissioners Road. Its name apparently references its 19th-century history as a road used for travelers headed to the city of Hamilton.

== Highbury Avenue ==
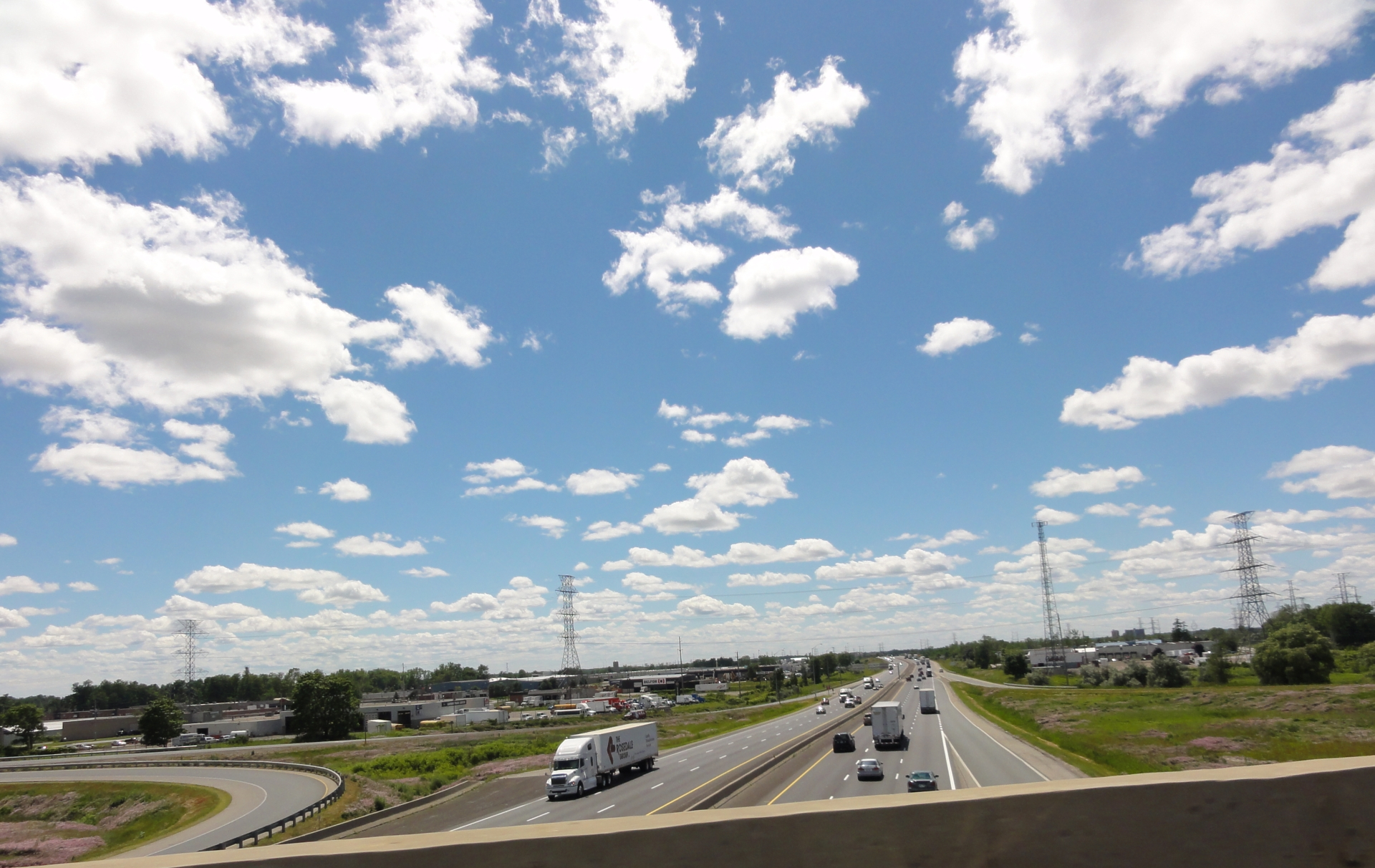
The view of Highway 401 West taken from the Highbury Avenue bridge

Highbury Avenue is a main thoroughfare in the eastern part of London, in the form of a former sideroad in London Township, from Hamilton Road northward. South of Hamilton Road, Highbury Avenue is a municipal expressway in the southeast part of the city, built in 1966 as part of a larger expressway plan that was cancelled amid public opposition. The expressway connects to Highway 401. Highbury Avenue continues south as a two-lane road to St. Thomas. At varying times, the portion of Highbury between Hamilton and Fanshawe Park Roads was rebuilt from a 2-lane road to a 4-lane road.

== Horton Street ==
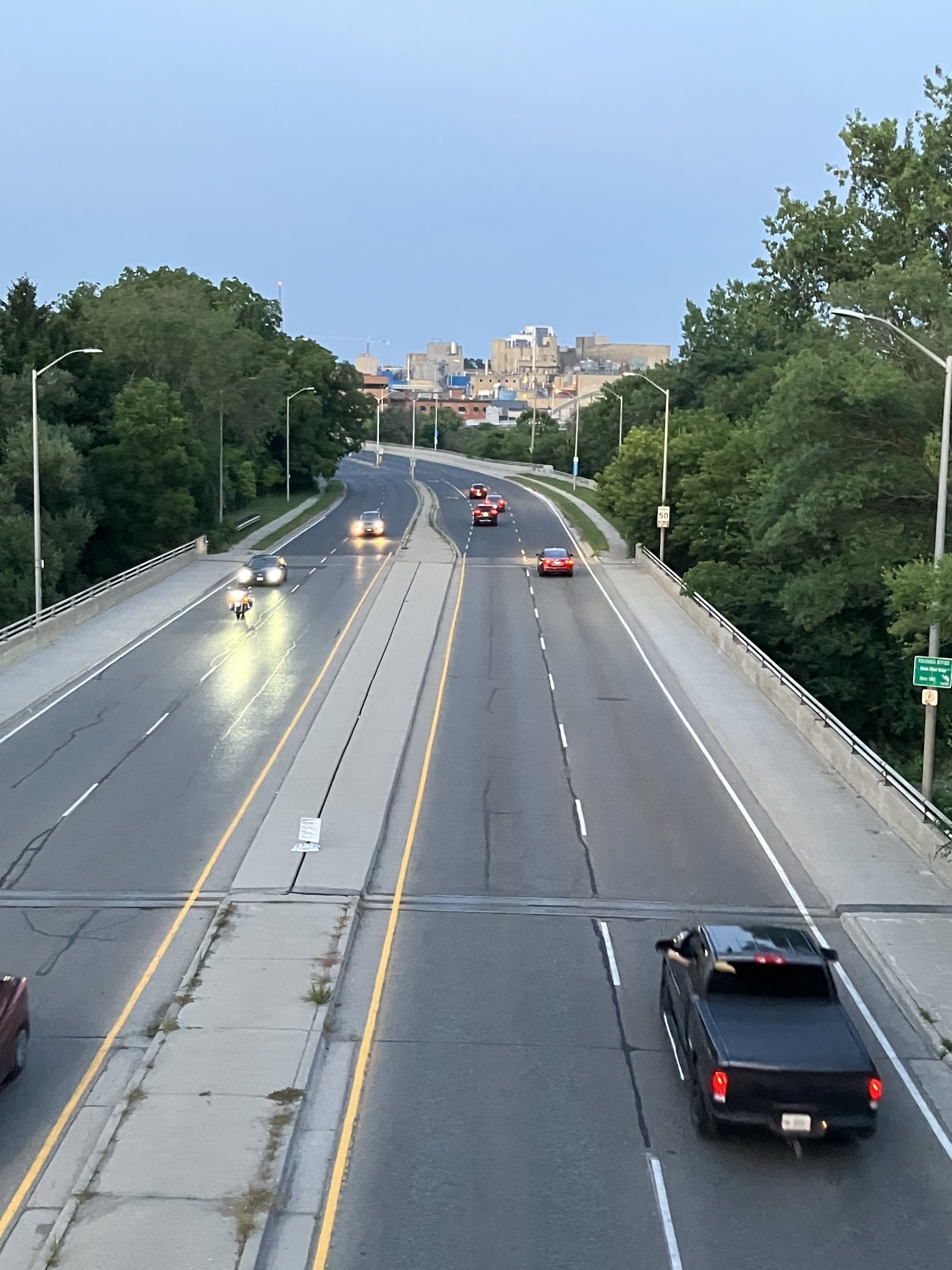
Horton Street eastbound, as seen from the Wortley Street flyover in 2025

Horton Street is a 3.5-kilometre-long (2.2 mi) main thoroughfare in the core area of London, the most direct and widest artery south of the CNR railway tracks, between Hamilton Road and Springbank Drive.

=== History ===
Horton Street was originally part of the grid of streets south of the CNR tracks, with its west end at Thames Street and most traffic turning a block east at Ridout to enter or exit Horton. The east end was mainly residential, with traffic flowing onto and off of Hamilton just east of Maitland Street where Horton meets Hamilton.

After years of controversy, in 1985, Horton was extended west across the Thames River, between the CNR tracks and Beaconsfield Avenue to Wharncliffe Road, then assumed the Beaconsfield right-of-way from there to end at Springbank Drive.

== Huron Street ==
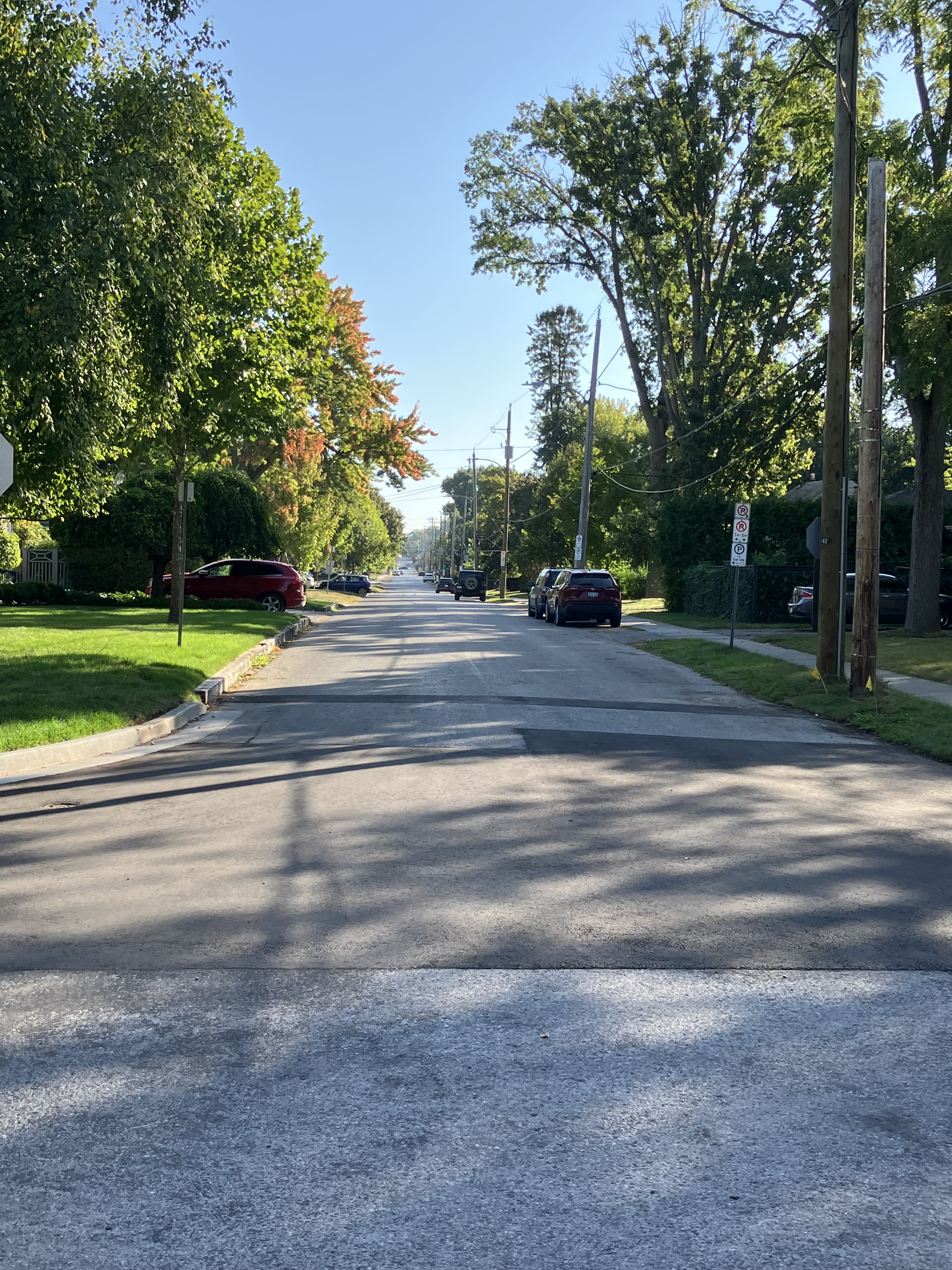
Huron Street looking east in London

Huron Street is a 9.21-kilometre-long (5.72 mi) main thoroughfare in the eastern part of London formerly Third Concession Road of London Township, traversing the north edge of the city's older grid-network neighbourhoods, from the Thames River at Gibbons Park to the London International Airport. It is interrupted for 330 metres (1,080 ft) by a ravine between William and Maitland Streets. A 1971 official plan envisioned construction of the missing link, but is not now expected, the road to the west being of minor significance, and amid environmental considerations through the ravine. Most of the route is two-lane road.

Historically, Huron Street extended east to Crumlin Sideroad at the east edge of London Township (closed to traffic upon development of military operational areas at the airport, but partly reopened in the 1990s), and there have been plans to extend it west across the Thames River to Western Road, connecting with an orphan segment between the river and Western Road which has now been renamed as part of the roadways at Western University. There is no current information on the routing of Huron in the vicinity of William and Maitland prior to the development of the area as part of London.

== Hyde Park Road ==
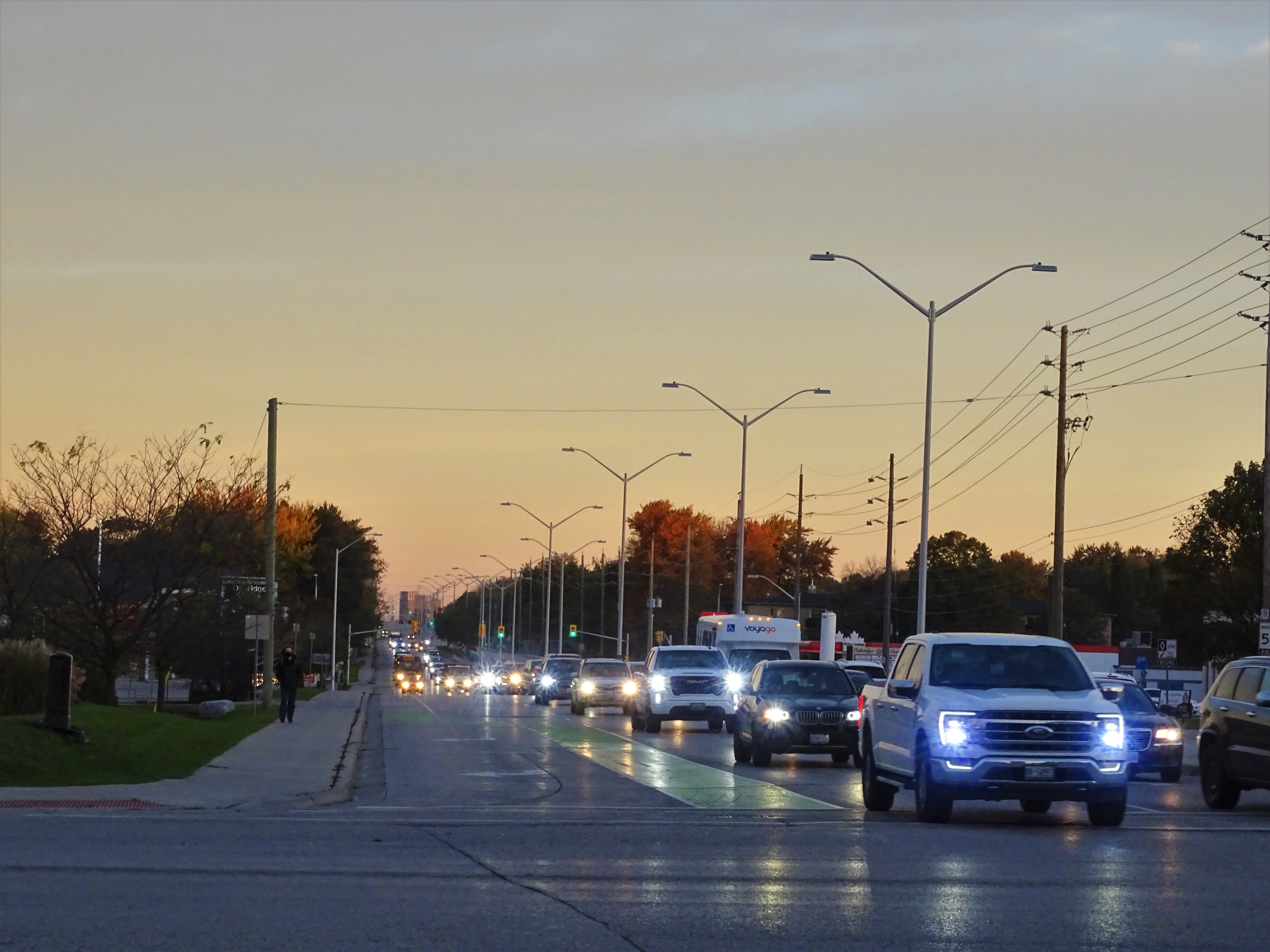
Hyde Park Road looking north from Oxford Street West

Hyde Park Road is an 8.1-kilometre-long (5.0 mi) north–south arterial road in London, Ontario, Canada. It extends from the Thames River in the Oakridge area northward through the village and road namesake of Hyde Park and through Ilderton north of the city to Highway 7.

=== History ===
Hyde Park Sideroad originally ran northward on a fairly straight alignment through the lowlands east of the Byron Bog. North of Oxford Street, it crossed the Canadian National Railway via a narrow truss bridge, and then crossed the Canadian Pacific Railway south of Hyde Park via a one-lane subway. In the early 1980s, Hyde Park Road was largely bypassed to the east between Oxford Street and Riverside Drive, completely avoiding the environmentally sensitive area near the bog which also included very steep grades. In the 1970s, there were conceptual plans for Hyde Park Road to bypass Hyde Park, to the east. This bypass was never constructed. In 1985, the CNR and CPR grade separations were replaced with new, wider structures.

Hyde Park Road experienced a high degree of traffic congestion between Oxford Street and Fanshawe Park Road. Construction to widen this segment of the road from two lanes to four was completed in 2016.

In 2021, a roundabout was constructed at Sunningdale Road.

== King Street ==
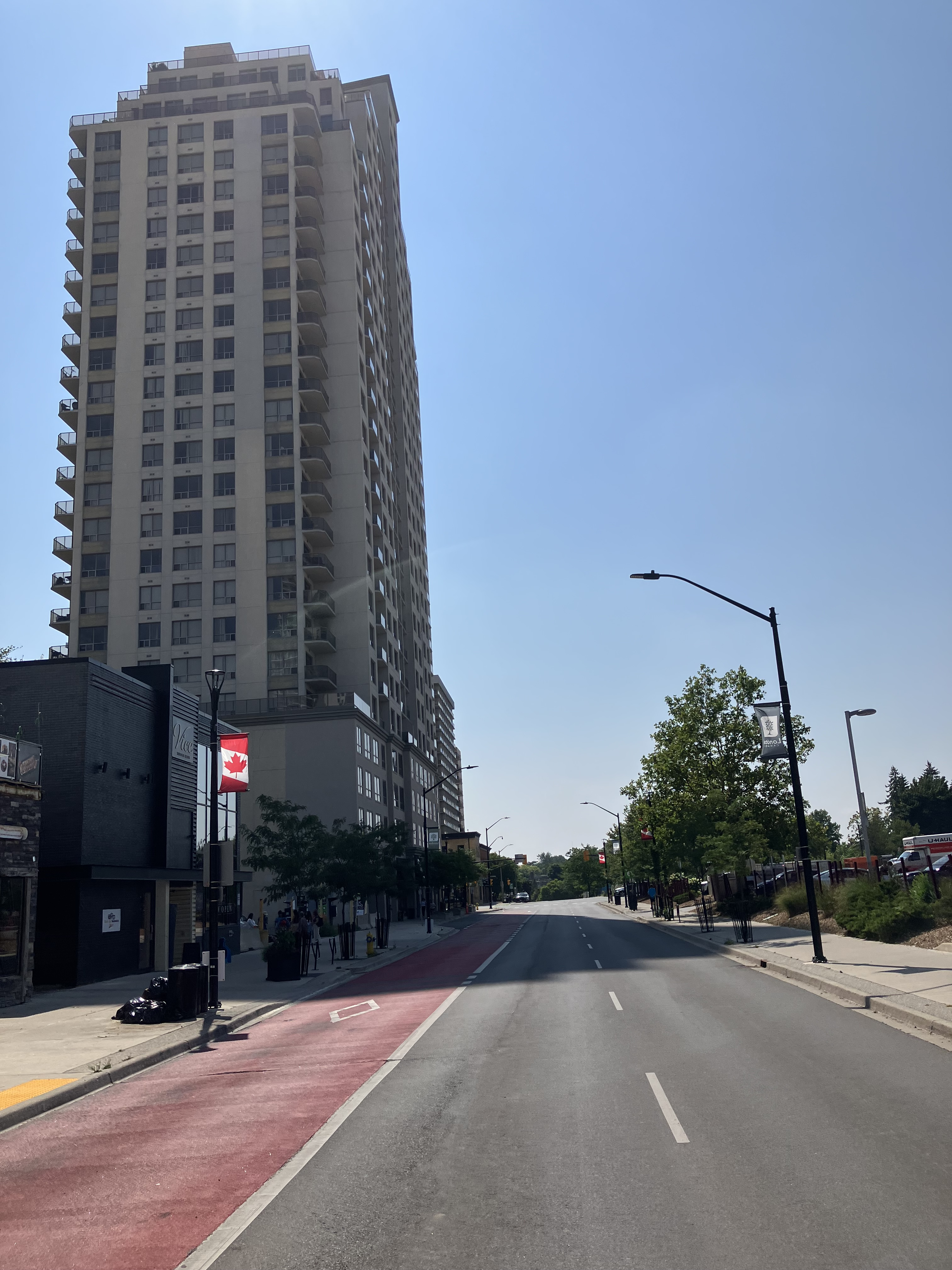
King Street looking west on the intersection with Talbot Street

King Street is an east–west road along a 4.67-kilometre-long (2.90 mi) pair of rights-of-way between the Thames River and Highbury Avenue, broken into two segments by the closure of part of that right-of-way for Queens Park. Its western segment is a 2.96 kilometres (1.84 mi) eastbound one-way road that complements westbound Queens Avenue, and has many older business establishments as well as passing through the midst of the large downtown mall. Near the intersection with Adelaide Street, a short linking road segment carries southbound only traffic to York Street. The eastern segment, separated from the other by Queens Park, is a 1.22-kilometre-long (0.76 mi) two-way road that formerly extended another 180 metres (590 ft) to Florence Street. Plans have existed since at least 1970 to construct a bridge at the west end to divert Riverside Drive traffic off of Dundas. Historically, King Street connected across the river with Becher Street, a residential street; the bridge still exists, but has been closed since the 1960s and is limited to pedestrian traffic.

King Street is part of the Bus Rapid Transit (BRT) Downtown Loop project. Phase 1 Construction began in April 2021 and it was completed sometime in December 2021. Phases 2 and 3 were completed in stages from March 2022 to spring of 2024.

== Oxford Street ==
Oxford Street is a 20.6-kilometre-long (12.8 mi) east–west arterial road, formerly Second Concession Road of London Township. It extends from Crumlin Road near London International Airport westward through the city to the western limits of the city, where it continues as Middlesex County Road 14.

Until 2003, Oxford Street ended at the Thames River heading westward. In November of that year, a new bridge opened, extending Oxford Street westward over the river and linking it with Commissioners Road west of Kains Road. Commissioners Road west of there became part of Oxford Street, and Commissioners Road itself was truncated at the new Oxford Street extension. The bridge was built wide enough to accommodate four lanes of traffic, but has remained two lanes wide.

Oxford Street was widened from two lanes to four lanes from the C.N.R. subway to Hyde Park Road in 2006, and further to Sanatorium Road in 2013.

== Quebec Street ==
Quebec Street is a 1.34-kilometre-long (0.83 mi) north–south road, extending from Dundas Street to Oxford Street, crossing the C.P.R. switching yard via a long bridge and providing the only crossing between Highbury and Adelaide. At the south end, it is in close proximity to Egerton Street, another north–south road that supplements arterial roads.

== Queens Avenue ==
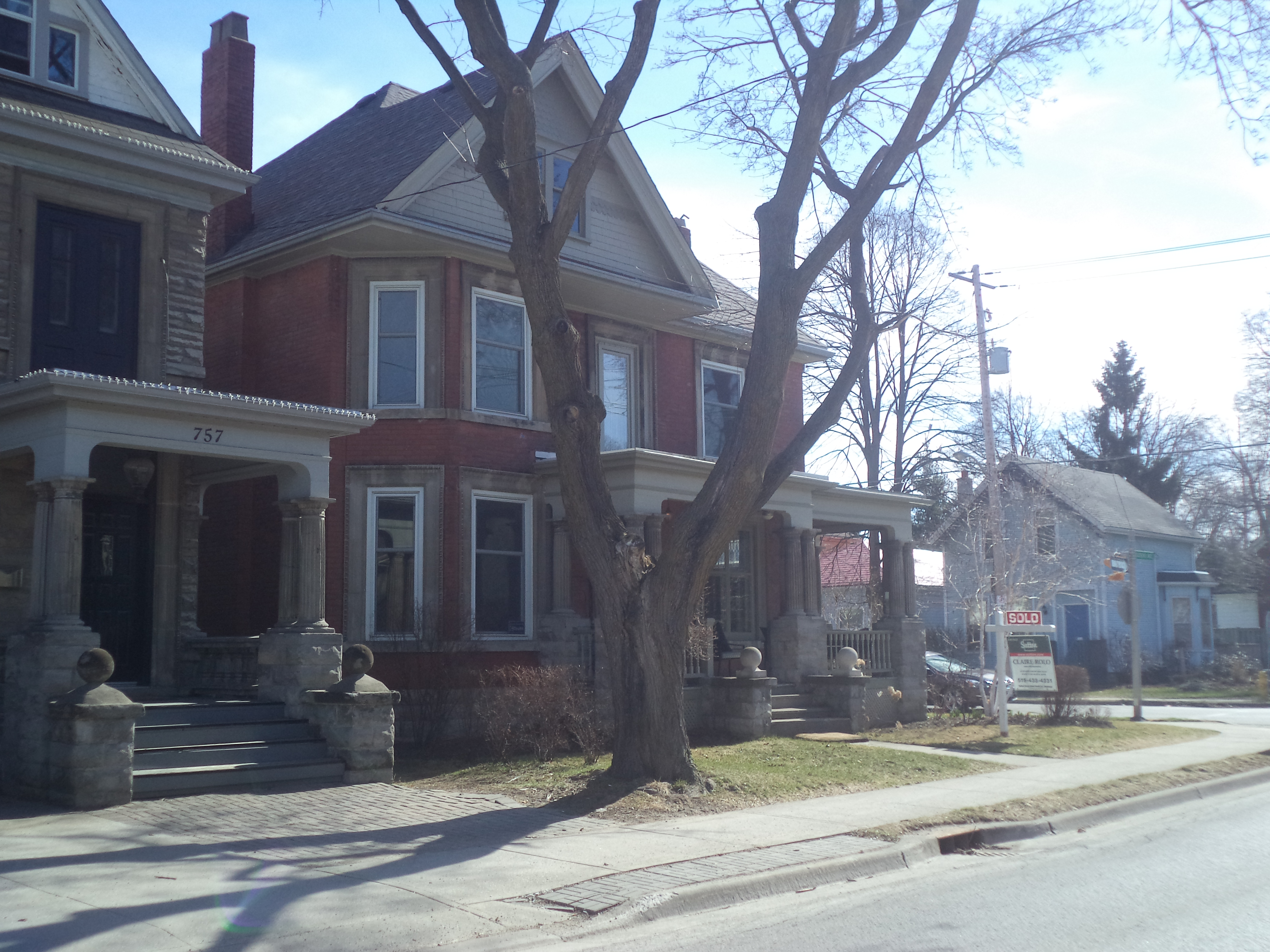
Queens Avenue (westbound only) in London's Old East Village

Queens Avenue is a 3.36-kilometre-long (2.09 mi) east–west one-way road that relieves westbound traffic loads on Dundas Street, which is one block to the south, and complements eastbound King Street two blocks south. The first block is relatively quiet, but becomes a busy artery carrying traffic west before merging with Riverside Drive just past the Thames River. Traffic westbound on Dundas toward Riverside is diverted north at Ridout to follow Queens. Although it bypasses the commercial core along Dundas, Queens passes several important institutional buildings, including office towers that house an insurance company, major central churches, government buildings, and the previous location of the central library. With two westbound lanes, fewer signalized intersections and more residential areas, it provides a slightly faster transit westward.

Originally, Queens Avenue ended at Ridout Street, but the bridge over the Thames River was constructed around 1970 to connect to Riverside Drive (at that time, known as Dundas Street West). Later in the 1970s, Dundas Street West was extended past Wharncliffe Road to connect to Mount Pleasant Avenue at Woodward Street, providing a continuous traffic route from Quebec Street to Sanitorium Road; the roadway west of the Thames was shortly afterward renamed as Riverside Drive.

== Richmond Street ==
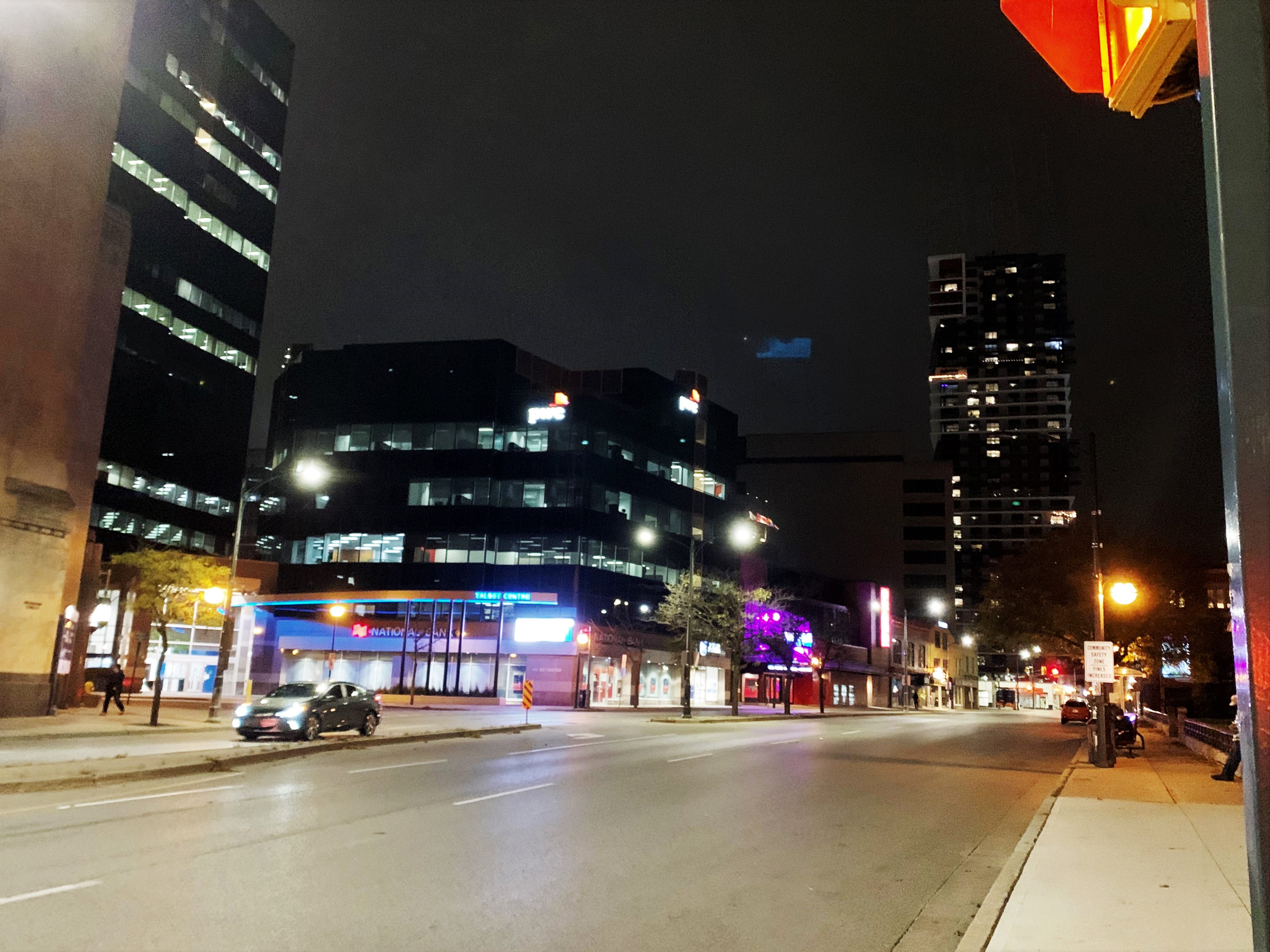
Richmond Street looking north from Queens Avenue

Richmond Street is an 8.8-kilometre-long (5.5 mi) main thoroughfare from the core area of London to the northern limits. It starts at the Thames River where it connects with the residential Carfrae Crescent, passing through the core of the city, veering westward beyond Huron Street and continuing northward beyond Windermere Road. It is a four-lane undivided road along most of its length, including the core area.

== Riverside Drive ==
Riverside Drive is a 6.9-kilometre-long (4.3 mi) east–west arterial road. It extends from the Forks of the Thames River in the Downtown area westward towards the suburb of Byron. The name was created due to its close proximity to the Thames River.

=== History ===
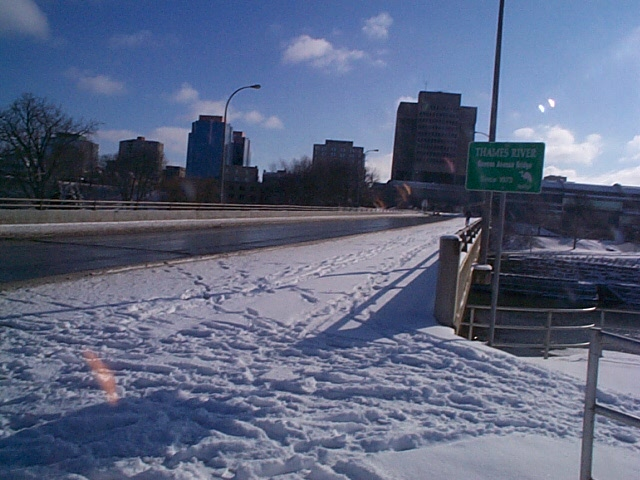
Riverside Drive heading east into Downtown

The modern-day Riverside Drive is made up of three separate London roads. The original Riverside Drive of 4.74 kilometres (2.95 mi) existed from the Thames River at Byron to the Canadian National Railway bridge near Mount Pleasant Cemetery; a 1.09 kilometres (0.68 mi) part of Mount Pleasant Avenue, which originally existed from the CNR bridge to Wharncliffe Road, and 1.05-kilometre-long (0.65 mi) Dundas Street West west of the forks of the Thames River to Wharncliffe Road.

In the 1970s, Dundas Street West (0.50 km) was extended 0.55 kilometres (0.34 mi) through the Kensington neighbourhood west from Wharncliffe Road to meet Mount Pleasant Avenue west of Charles Street. This necessitated the demolition of a number of houses in Kensington. The Dundas extension was built as a four-lane facility. Previously traffic heading westbound on Dundas Street West had to turn right at Wharncliffe Road in order to get to Mount Pleasant Avenue.

The original CNR bridge connecting Riverside Drive to Mount Pleasant Avenue included sharp curves at the approaches, as the bridge crossed at a 90-degree angle to the railway tracks. In 1974, the corridor was realigned with a new deck bridge located just north of the original one. This bridge was built wide enough to accommodate a four-lane road, but the road remains two lanes today. In 1978 the Riverside Drive designation was extended eastward along Mount Pleasant Avenue and Dundas Street West to the Kensington Bridge.

Riverside Drive was also realigned in 1977 at Hutton Road when the Guy Lombardo Bridge was built, with a four-lane diversion to the north of the original alignment.

== Southdale Road ==
Southdale Road is a 12.7-kilometre-long (7.9 mi) east–west arterial road, formerly Second Concession Road of Westminster Township. It extends from Pond Mills Road westward through the city to the western limits of the city with its terminus at Westdel Bourne.

Southdale is 2-lanes from Pond Mills Road to Millbank Drive, 3-lanes to Adelaide Street South, 2-lanes to Dearness Drive, a block east of Wellington Road, where it expands to 4-lanes.

London had looked into feasibility studies of expanding Southdale Road in between Wharncliffe and Wonderland to a 4-lane road. This would be to reduce traffic congestion due to recent development of big box stores and housing in the area. Construction began in the summer of 2013, and is now complete.

An environmental assessment study was completed in 2019 which recommended Southdale Road to be widened from two to four lanes, in two phases, between Pine Valley Boulevard and Colonel Talbot Road. Construction between Pine Valley Boulevard and Bostwick Road was completed in 2022. The construction between Bostwick Road and Colonel Talbot Road is anticipated to begin in 2031.

As of 2022, Southdale Road is a continuous four lane road from Wellington Road heading west to Bostwick Road.

== Springbank Drive ==
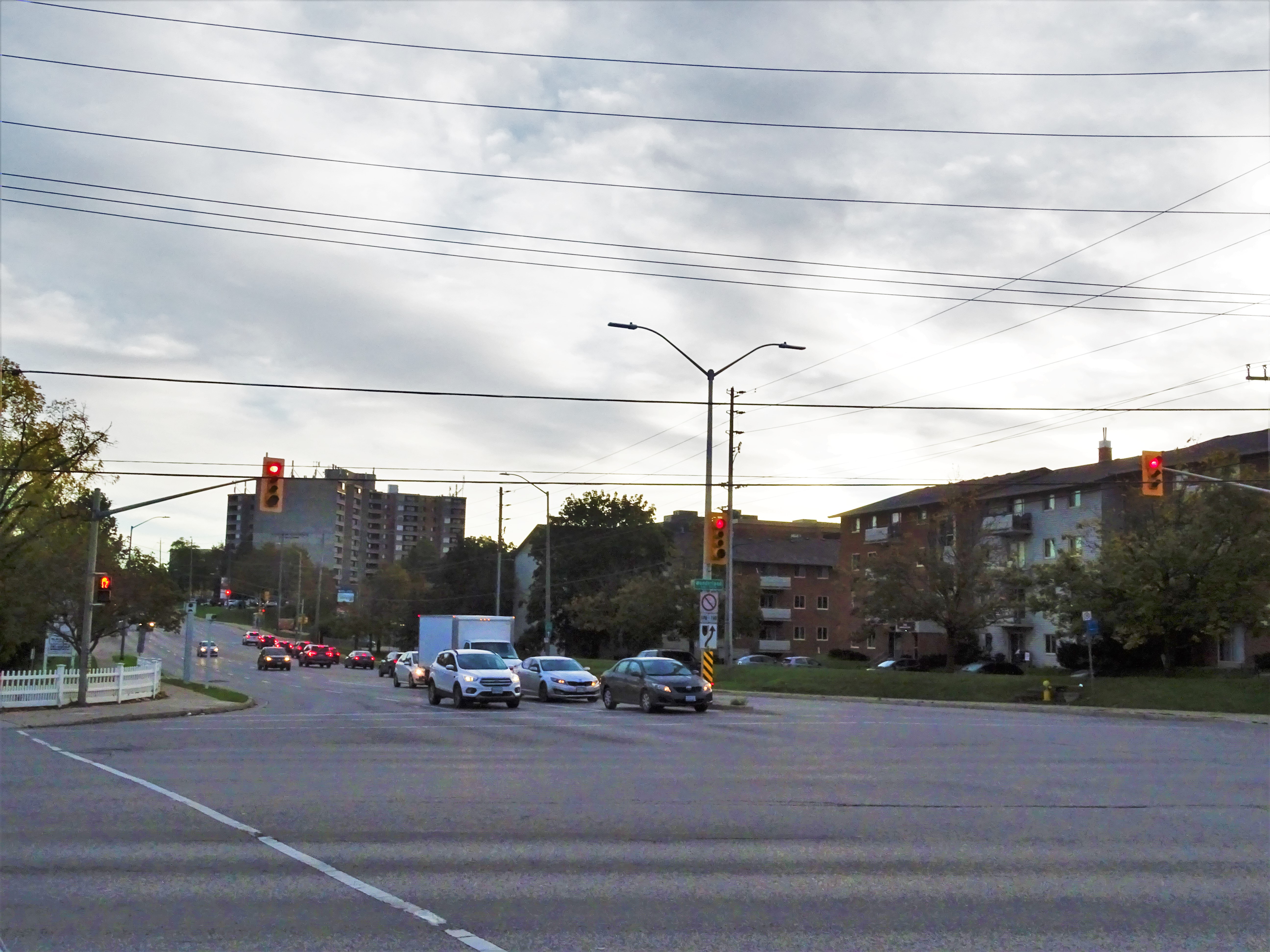
Springbank Drive looking east from Wonderland Road

Originally known as "Pipe Line Road", Springbank Drive connects on its east end with Wharncliffe Road South, and passes through residential areas before bordering the south side of Springbank Park. When it meets Commissioners Road 5.1 km from Wharncliffe, traffic proceeding straight through continues along Byron Base Line Road along the south edge of the original Byron village site to Westdel Bourne. (This section originally was known simply as Base Line Road, which is also the name of two disconnected segments to the east.)

Springbank Drive is four-lanes west as far as Wonderland, where it narrows to a two-lane road, parts of it against a steep hill between Springbank Park and the reservoir hill. The west end of Horton Street is oriented to directly continue traffic with Springbank; Springbank east of this point is connected to Horton-Springbank at a regular right-angle intersection.

== Sunningdale Road ==
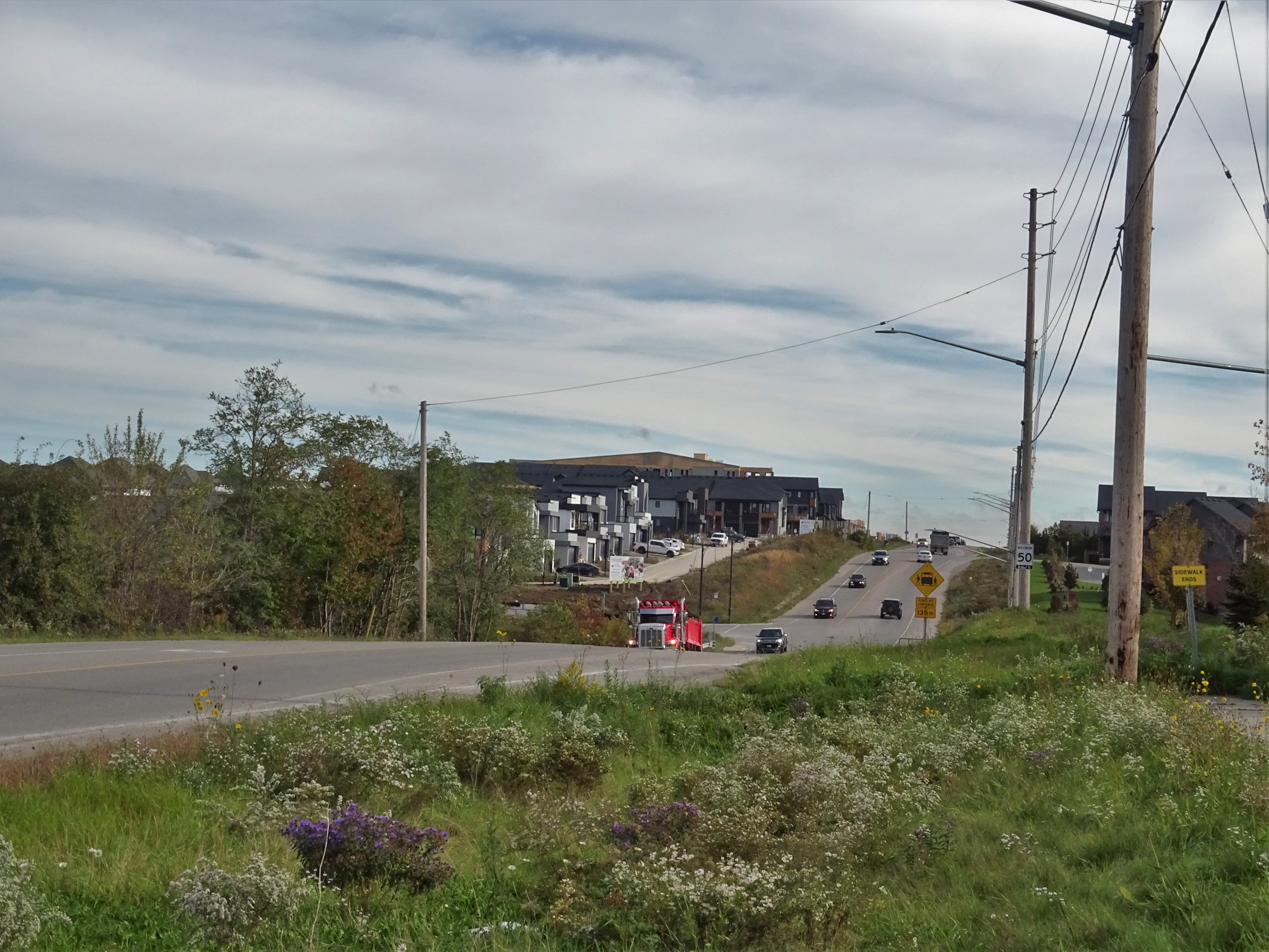
Sunningdale Road East looking east from Bluebell Road

Sunningdale Road, 15.1 kilometres (9.4 mi) long, is the northernmost east–west arterial road in London, formerly Sixth Concession Road of London Township. Albeit largely rural in nature, it has recently seen development between Wonderland Road and Adelaide Street. Its western terminus is at Vanneck Road in Middlesex Centre and extends eastward to Fanshawe Golf Course east of Clarke Road. It passes through the neighbourhoods of Foxhollow, Upper Richmond Village, Northcrest, and Stoney Creek. Sunningdale Road is bisected into eastern and western halves by Richmond Street.

In 1993, most of the road became a part of London following an annexation from the Township of London.

In 2014, a roundabout opened at Wonderland Road North.

In 2017, Highway 4 was rerouted through London, using Sunningdale between Wonderland and Richmond as the new route.

In 2021, a roundabout was constructed at Hyde Park Road.

Beginning in 2025, Sunningdale Road West between Wonderland Road North and Richmond Street will be reconstructed to 4 lanes, with the addition of replacing underground infrastructure, new bike paths, and full signalization of Meadowlands Way with crosswalks for improved safety. The full project is expected to be complete by 2027.

== Veterans Memorial Parkway ==
Veterans Memorial Parkway
- Location: London
- Length: 13.4 km (8.3 mi)
- Existed: 1977–present
- History: Widened in 2006 to a modern, at-grade expressway

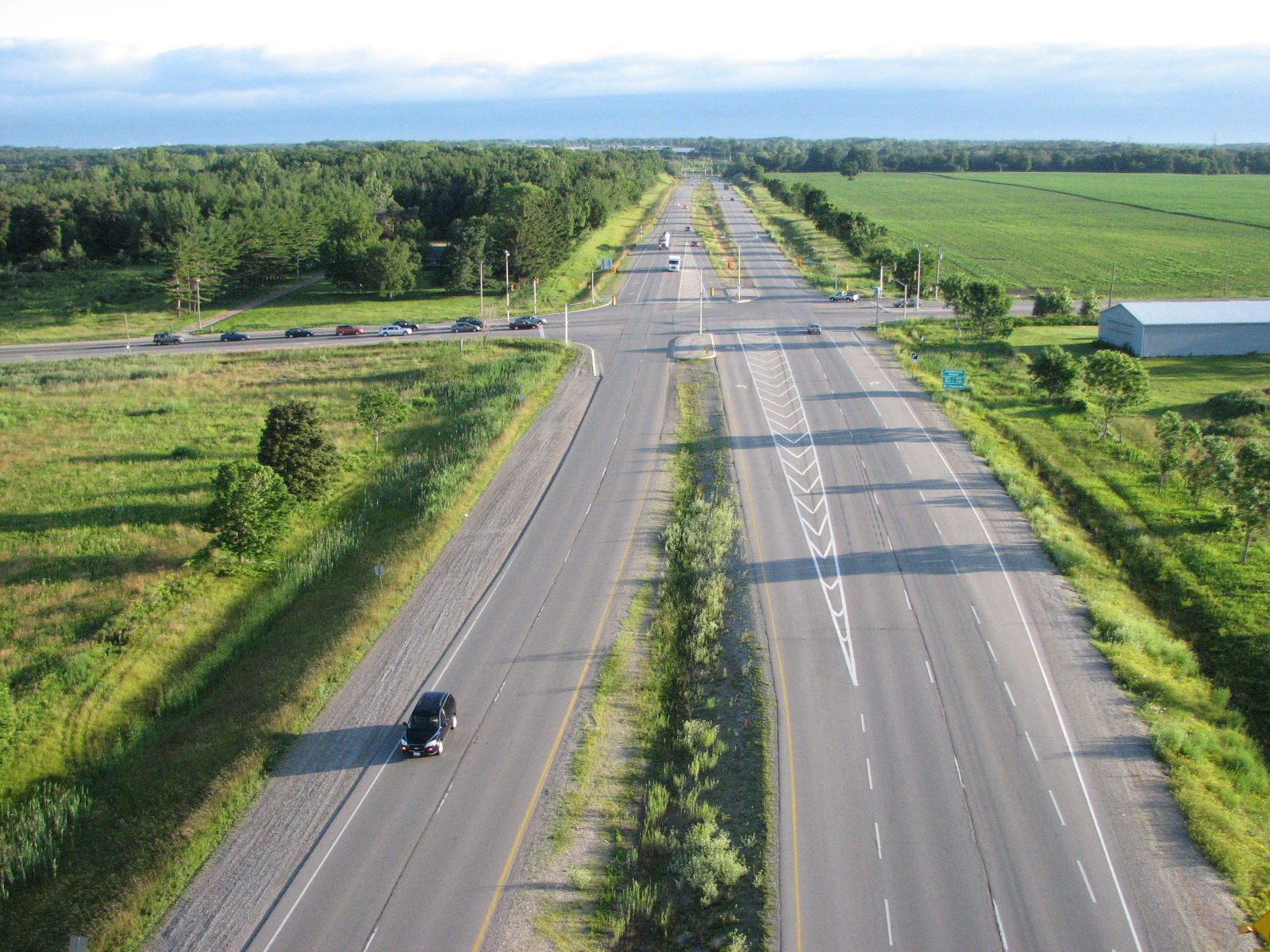
Veterans Memorial Parkway looking north over Hamilton Road

The Veterans Memorial Parkway (VMP) is a 13.4 km (8.3 mi) expressway located in London, Ontario, with a non-expressway extension northwards to Clarke Road from Huron Street. The expressway was previously known as Highway 100 from 1977 until 1994 and as Airport Road prior to September 2006. It is currently an at-grade, four-lane expressway. Long term plans / proposals for the route include north and south extensions of the road and grade separated interchanges along its entire length, converting it to a freeway.

== Wellington Road ==
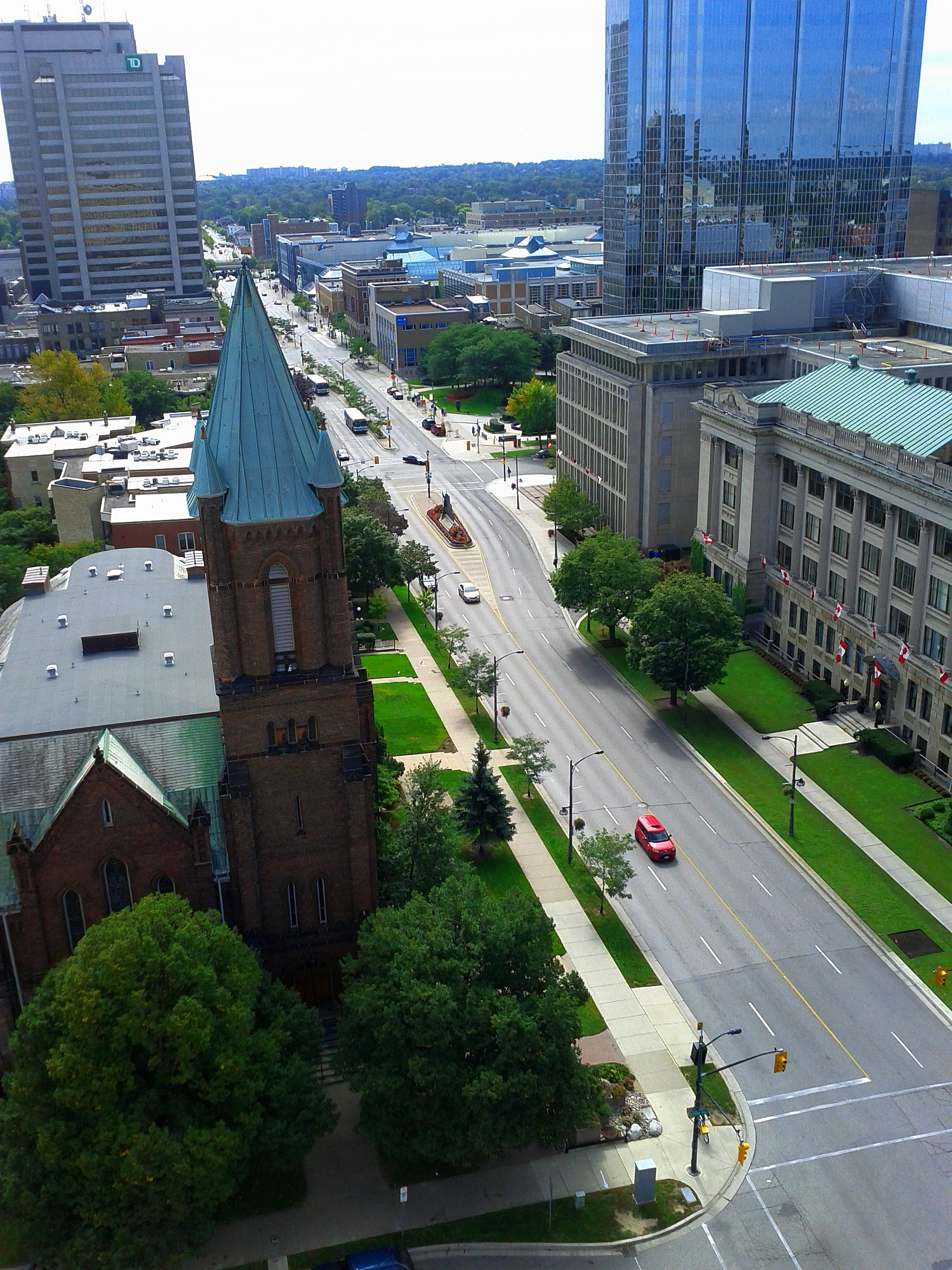
Wellington Street in downtown London viewed from city hall.

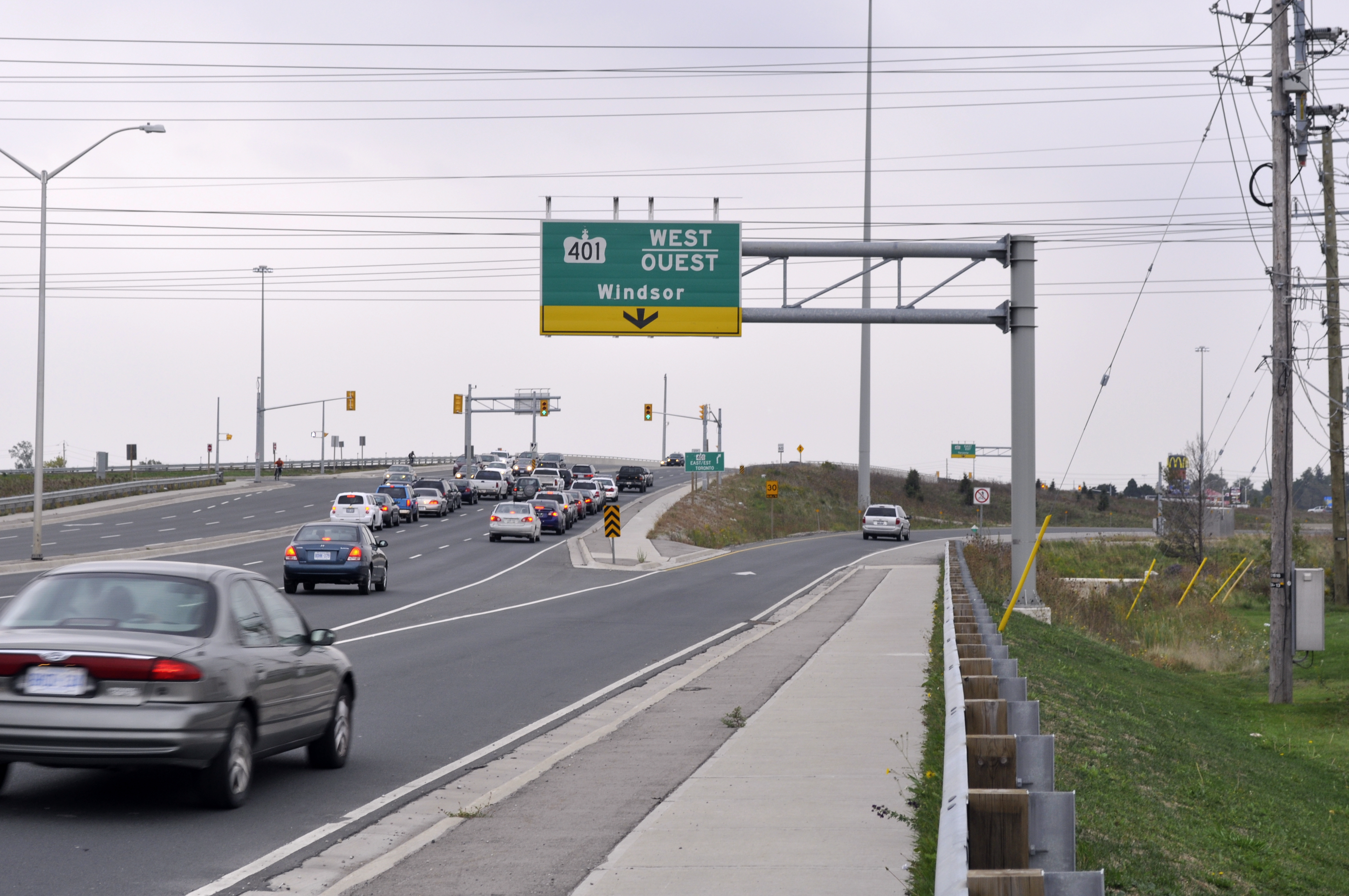
Wellington Road / Highway 401 interchange: London's downtown gateway.

Wellington Road is a 15.6-kilometre-long (9.7 mi) major arterial road which forms a key route for both local and out-of-town traffic between St. Thomas, Highway 401 and London's downtown core. It runs in a north–south direction for most of its length. As of 2013, the section between Commissioners and Southdale Roads is London's most travelled at 48,000 vehicles per day.

Most of the Wellington Road corridor is home to many commercial and institutional establishments such as White Oaks Mall, LHSC Victoria Hospital and various hotels and restaurants.

North of the Thames River, it adjoins Wellington Street, which extends along a 4.0 kilometres (2.5 mi) right-of-way through the core area and quickly becomes a residential street at Central Avenue, interrupted for 250 metres (820 ft) at the CPR railway tracks, and ending near Huron Street.

Wellington Road will be part of the Bus Rapid Transit (BRT) project with construction anticipated to last from 2023 to 2028.

== Westdel Bourne ==
Westdel Bourne is a rural arterial road in west London near the city's limits. It starts in the north at Kains Road in the Riverbend neighborhood and ends in the south at Southminster Bourne in Southwold Township. It was the townline for the then-Townships of Westminster and Delaware. In 1990, the Town of Westminster renamed several roads. The townline's new name, Westdel, came from a combination of the two municipalities. "Bourne" was derived from an old English word meaning "dividing line". London acquired part of this road pursuant to its annexation of Westminster in 1993. The remainder (south of Westminster Drive) was ceded to Delaware Township.

== Western Road ==
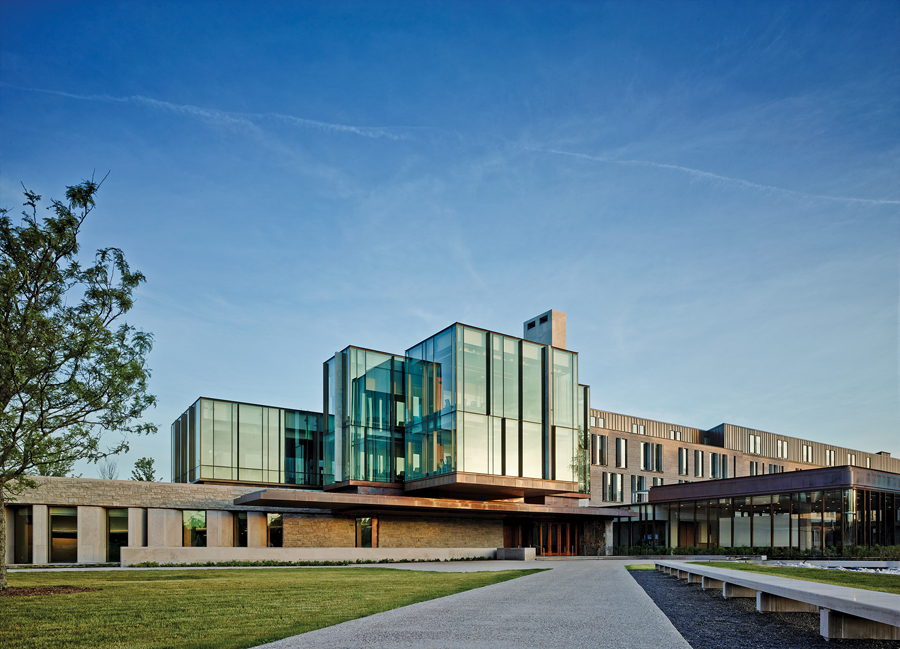
Walking path from Western Road towards Ivey Business School

Western Road is a 3.4-kilometre-long (2.1 mi) north–south arterial road which skirts around the west side of the University of Western Ontario campus, University Hospital, and various student residences including Saugeen-Maitland Hall. Western Road starts at Richmond Street just south of the Masonville Place shopping centre continuing southward to connect with Wharncliffe Road.

=== History ===
Western Road takes its name after the University of Western Ontario and is one of the main access routes to the campus. It also acts as a key corridor for traffic bypassing some of the older, more congested neighborhoods of north London. The road was primary rural until the 1960s, becoming more urbanized with the growth of the university.

Expansive residential growth in North London, along with its proximity to the university campus and hospital, led to serious road deficiencies. The road experienced congestion during peak travel periods as well as numerous potholes and worn pavement.

Due to this, Western Road was nominated as one of the worst roads in Ontario by the Canadian Automobile Association . In 2007, Western Road was widened to four lanes from Huron University College to Richmond Street. The road now features a wide, treed boulevard within the campus area.

== Wharncliffe Road ==
Wharncliffe Road is a 10.7-kilometre-long (6.6 mi) main thoroughfare just west of the core area of London. It starts with a 300-metre one-block residential section north of Western Road, then serves as a main artery from the south end of Western Road, across Oxford Street, Riverside Drive, the Thames River, Horton Street and Commissioners Road, to Southdale, where it turns to the southwest, following the route of the former London and Lake Erie Railway (discontinued in fall 1918) to end in Lambeth where it adjoins Main Street.

== White Oak Road ==
White Oak Road follows a 10.5 kilometres (6.5 mi) path in London's south end, starting in a residential area at the south side of the Highland Country Club and continuing southward to Harry White Drive. It is situated midway between (and runs parallel to) Wellington Road and Wonderland Road.

== Wonderland Road ==
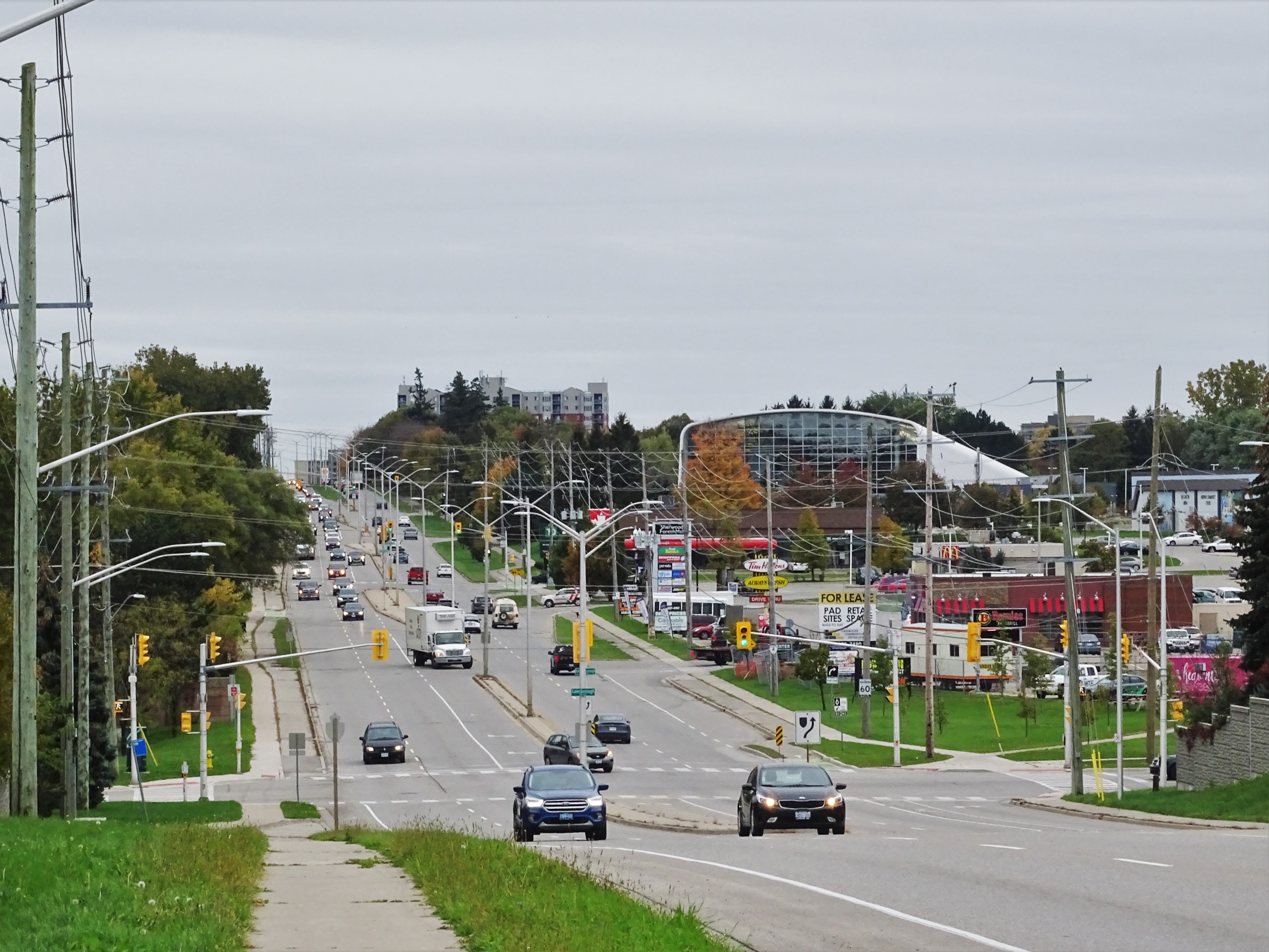
Wonderland Road North looking south towards Gainsborough Road

Wonderland Road is a major north–south, 23.3-kilometre-long (14.5 mi) arterial road and one of the busiest roads in London, carrying on average over 45,000 vehicles daily between Springbank Drive and Riverside Drive in 2002. With completion of an interchange with Highway 401 in 2016, Wonderland forms a continuous route from Highway 7 in the north to just north of Highway 3 near Talbotville Royal, making it one of only two thoroughfares connecting to both the north and south city limits.

Wonderland Road takes its name from the Wonderland Gardens concert hall located near Springbank Park. The present-day Wonderland Road corridor is made up of part or all of six London-area roads, including Cameron Sideroad north of Gainsborough, Sarnia Gravel Road between Gainsborough and Sarnia Road, Hutton Road between Sarnia Road and Riverside Drive, Wonderland Road between the Thames River and Viscount Road, Airport Road between Southdale Road and Wharncliffe Road, and Bostwick Road south of Wharncliffe Road.

== York Street ==
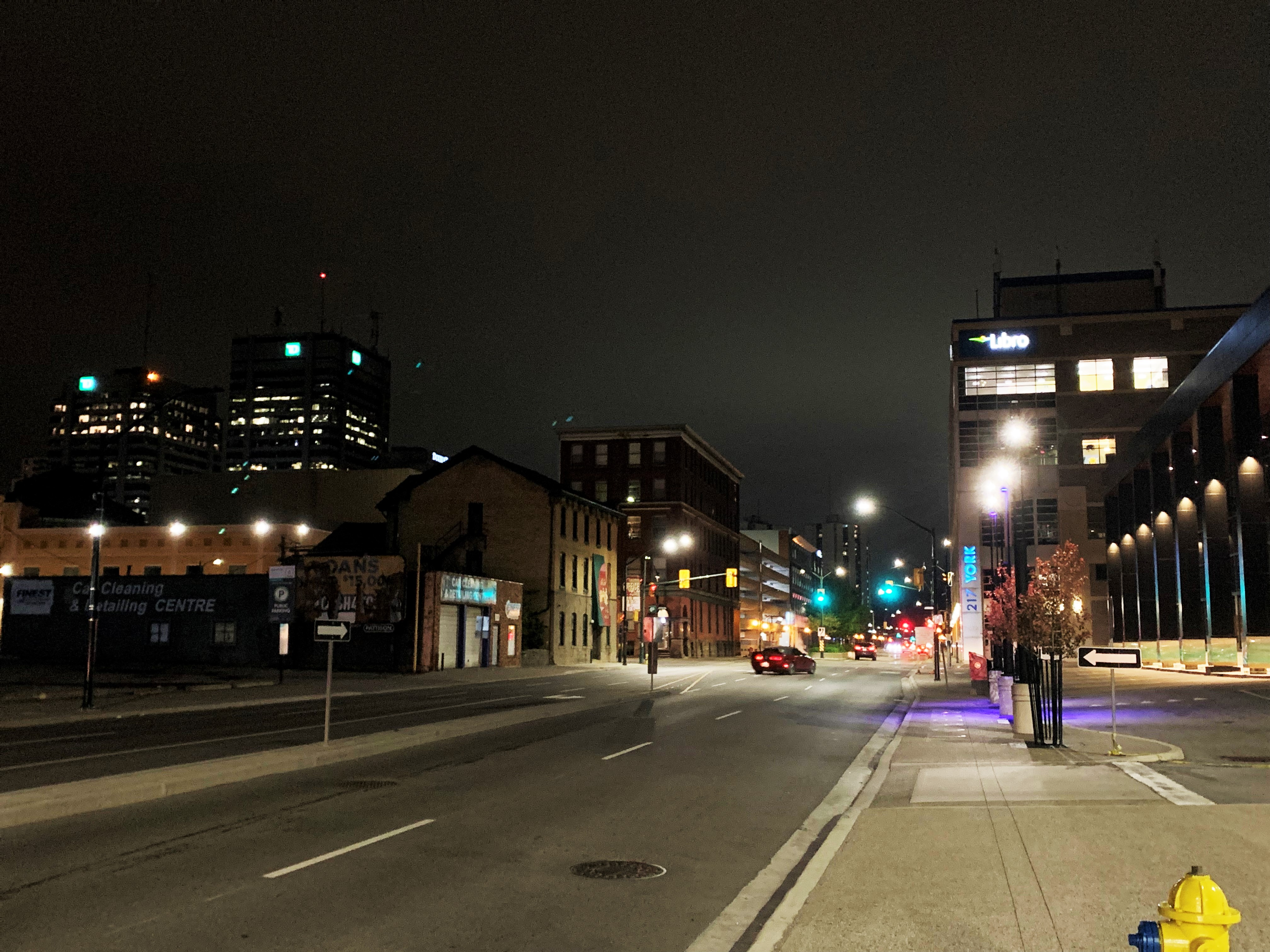
York Street looking east towards Clarence Street

York Street is a 2.8-kilometre-long (1.7 mi) main thoroughfare in downtown London, preferred over Dundas Street (two blocks north) as a main artery through the core area as it is a four-lane road along its entire length east of Ridout Street until just west of Rectory Street. At Rectory Street, it is interrupted by the Queens Park grounds, and traffic east of Rectory follows Florence Street (three blocks south of Dundas) as far as Highbury (for north- and south-bound traffic), or continuing to Dundas for eastbound traffic. A short interchange exists to carry easterly traffic on York from Wellington Road and westbound traffic from Rectory Street onto the Adelaide Street overpass above. (See Adelaide Street, above).

At the west end, it connects over the Thames River with Stanley Street, which extends 0.55 km to Wharncliffe Road. At one time, an extension was considered beyond Wharncliffe, south under the CNR tracks to connect with Beaconsfield Avenue and continue to Springbank Drive. Instead, city council chose to build the Horton Street extension which then followed Beaconsfield Avenue west from Wharncliffe to join Springbank Drive.

A second section of York Street runs 1.22 kilometres (0.76 mi) between Egerton Street and Highbury Avenue, as a local residential street.

== See also ==
- Royal eponyms in Canada
