= Veterans Memorial Parkway =

Limited-access highway in London, Ontario

Highway Veterans Memorial Parkway
- Formerly Airport Road; Formerly Highway 100
- Veterans Memorial Parkway highlighted in red

Route information
- Maintained by City of London
- Length: 13.4 km (8.3 mi)
- History: Opened in 1977

Major junctions
- South end: Wilton Grove Road
- Highway 401
- North end: Clarke Road

Location
- Country: Canada
- Province: Ontario
- Major cities: London

Highway system
- Ontario provincial highways; Current; Former; 400-series
Ontario municipal expressways
(in alphabetical order)
← Red Hill Valley Parkway	Veterans Memorial Parkway

The Veterans Memorial Parkway (VMP, known as "Veterans" by locals) is a 13.4-kilometre (8.3 mi) limited-access and municipally maintained parkway located entirely within London, Ontario. The parkway was previously the provincial King's Highway 100 from 1977 until 1993, and was formerly named Airport Road from 1977 to September 2006. It begins in the south at Wilton Grove Road and ends at Clarke Road, which it continues as northward.

Airport Road was built by the Ministry of Transportation and Communications, predecessor to the modern Ministry of Transportation (MTO) in the late 1970s to connect Highway 401 with London International Airport. It was widened to four lanes in 2005 and renamed as the Veterans Memorial Parkway in 2006. Extensions south and north were completed in 2017 and 2020, respectively. Long term plans for the route call for grade separated interchanges along its entire length to convert it to a freeway.

== Route description ==
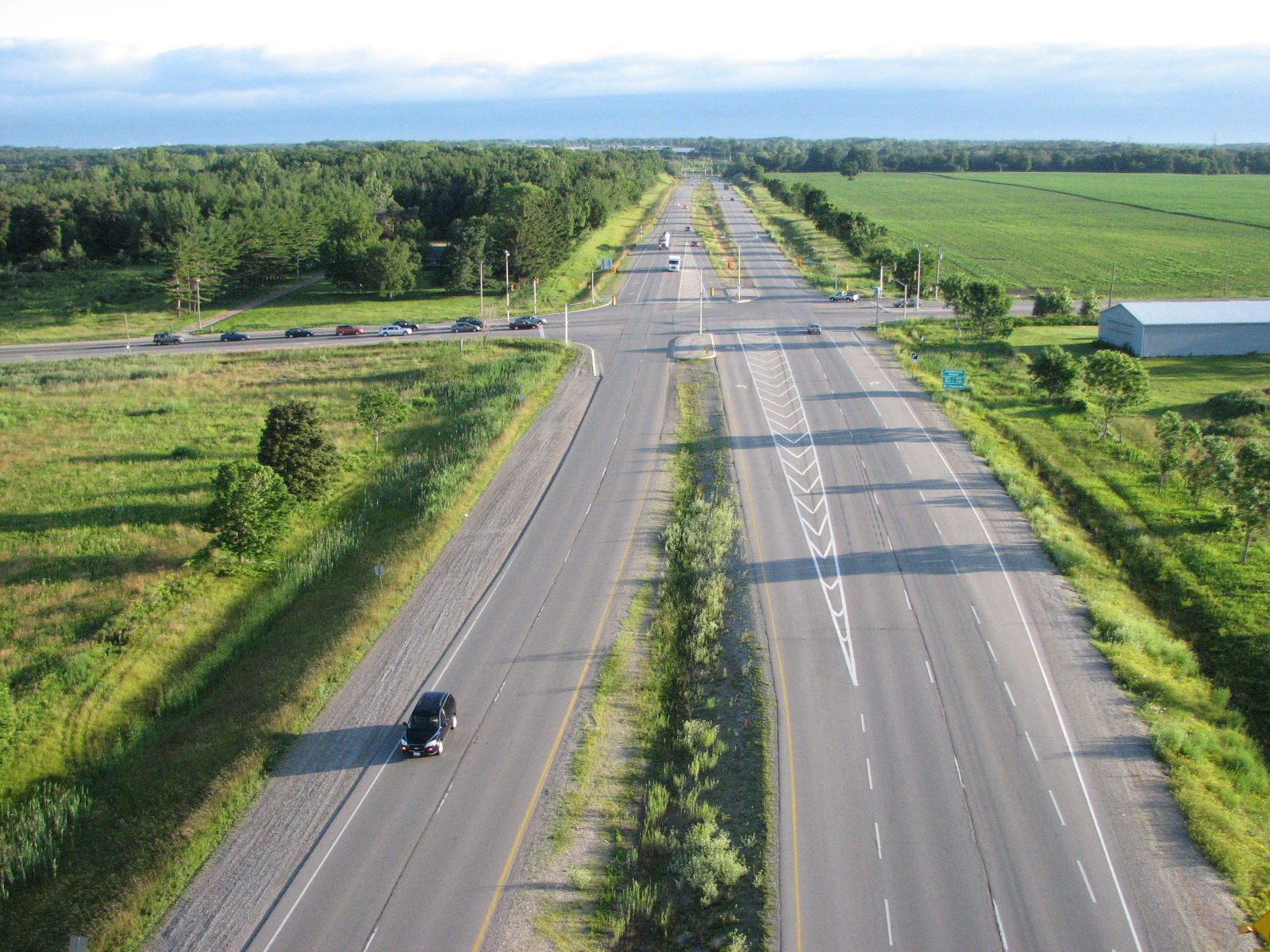
Veterans Memorial Parkway looking north over Hamilton Road

The Veterans Memorial Parkway is a 13.4-kilometre (8.3 mi) expressway located within London, Ontario. The parkway begins at Wilton Grove Road, immediately south of Highway 401, and travels north to Clarke Road, which it continues as northwards.

The parkway begins as a two-lane expressway that progresses northward through farm fields for 870 yards (800 metres; 2,610 feet) before crossing over Highway 401 at a partial cloverleaf interchange (Exit 194). It widens to four lanes north of the interchange and travels through empty fields, with several new industrial developments dotting the landscape, including a Dr. Oetker pizza factory. It intersects Bradley Avenue and Hamilton Road before crossing the South Thames River.

The Veterans Memorial Parkway curves slightly northwest as it intersects River Road and enters suburban London. It passes under the Canadian National Railway (CN) Dundas subdivision before intersecting Gore Road. Now surrounded by commercial developments, it intersects Tartan Drive and Trafalgar Street. It curves north, with subdivisions now bordering its western side, before intersecting Admiral Drive and later Dundas Street. The parkway swerves lightly east and crosses the CP rail Galt Subdivision.

Now within a light industrial area, the route intersects Page Street and Oxford Street East before curving northwest and crossing Pottersburg Creek. The parkway meets the CN Strathroy Subdivision at an at-grade crossing before intersecting Huron Street. Returning to undeveloped land, the route swerves northwest before intersecting and becoming Clarke Road.

== History ==
London endured a long debate about in-city freeway connections through the city and west to Sarnia, through the 1960s. Repeated debates moved the links into and out of the city limits, and considered numerous options that either cut through existing neighbourhoods or were routed further out from the city center. One proposed road would connect to Highway 401 in the south and join up with Highway 402 in the west. This plan, however, never came to fruition due to city council's reluctance to fund an urban freeway. When city council became more united in opposition to Highway 402 being routed through London, the highway now known as Veterans Memorial Parkway was conceived by the Ontario government as a compromise: a spur highway that would run along the eastern parts of London.

The City of London and the province decided that the proposed road would be constructed as a two-lane highway from Highway 401 north to Oxford Street. Designed as a super two, the design included a 250-metre-wide (820 ft) right-of-way so that an additional carriageway could be built in the future. As well, the road would be designated as Highway 100 and named "Airport Road". The road featured traffic lights at intersections, with available right-of-way to build interchanges if warranted. Construction on Airport Road began in early 1975, with its official opening in 1977.

The London–Middlesex Act, passed December 10, 1992, expanded the municipal boundaries of the City of London effective January 1, 1993. Consequently, the Ministry of Transportation transferred responsibility for Highway 100 to the city several months later on June 24. In 1998, the road was extended further north from Oxford to Huron Street.

On April 17, 2003, funding was announced as part of a joint venture between the City of London, the Government of Ontario, and the Government of Canada, to widen Airport Road from Highway 401 to Oxford Street. Construction began in 2004, using the right-of-way to construct another carriageway separated by a grass median. The completion of the project resulted in a four-lane, divided highway with at-grade intersections but sufficient room for future interchanges and overpasses, similar to that of the Hanlon Expressway. The widening was completed in 2005.

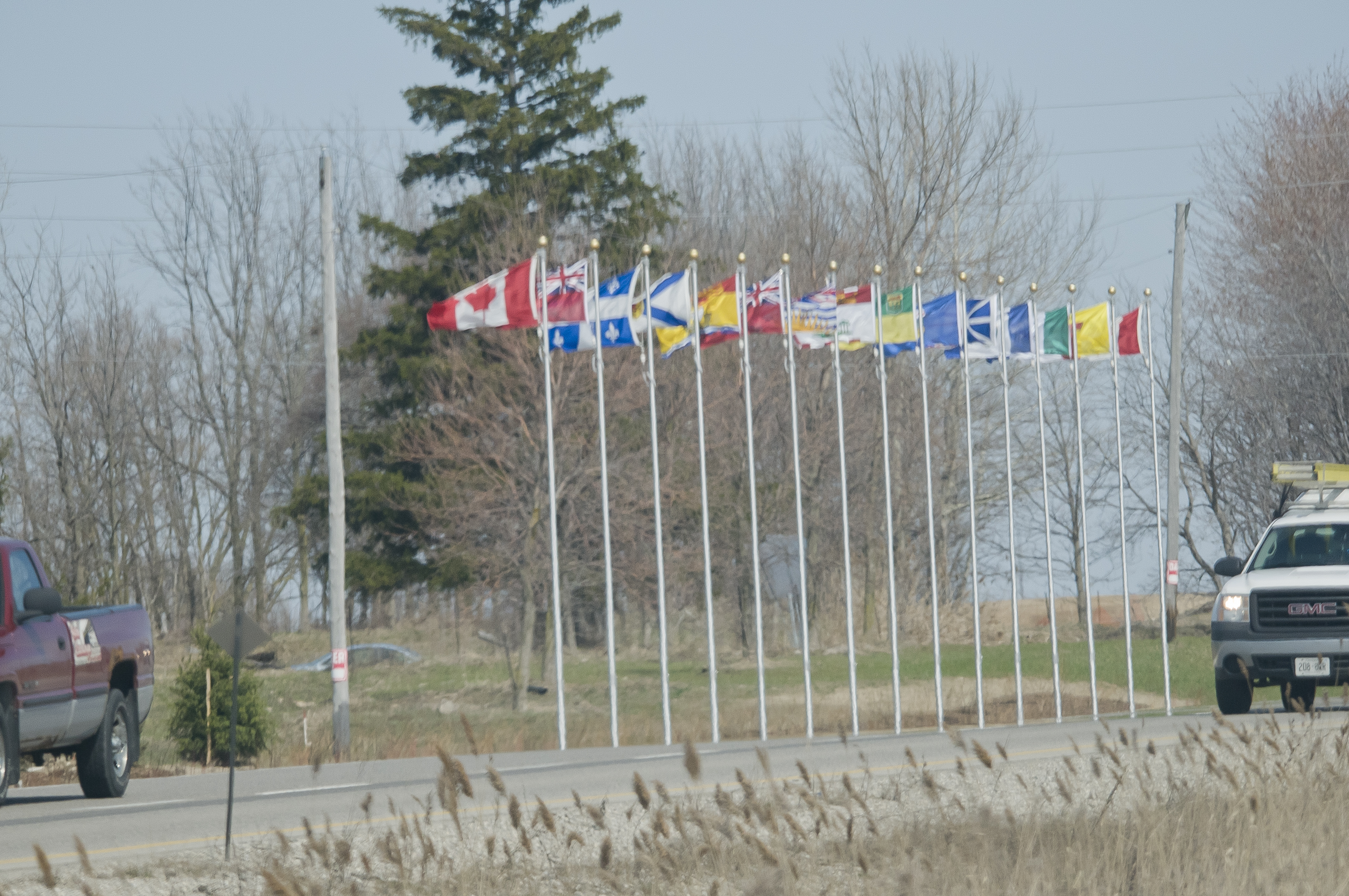
Flagpoles along the southbound lanes of Veterans Memorial Parkway near the Highway 401 interchange

On October 25, 2005, the London city council voted in favour of renaming Airport Road as the "Veterans Memorial Parkway" as a tribute to Canadian veterans. This name change ceremoniously took place on September 15, 2006. The state of the parkway quickly drew the ire of locals and veterans, with one remarking that the weeds and litter were an "insult". A C$1.5 million proposal for beautification, designed by local architect Ron Koudys, called for the planting of flowers within the median, and shrubs and trees along the outskirts of the road. However, due to lack of funding, it took until 2010 for the project to begin. It included a large gateway monument which was installed on the northbound lanes near the Highway 401 interchange, greeting motorists entering the expressway, planting trees along the entire length of the expressway, and raising flagpoles in tribute to Canadian veterans.

As part of an effort to create new industrial parks, London city council approved a proposal to extend the parkway 870 yards (800 m; 2,610 ft) south to Wilton Grove Road on April 5, 2011. The proposed extension included the reconstruction of the existing trumpet interchange with Highway 401 into a partial cloverleaf. Construction began on the extension in September 2016. The C$23.5 million project was completed on November 10, 2017. A northern extension, north and west from Huron Street to Clarke Road, was proposed in 2007. On March 11, 2020, construction began on the C$12 million extension, including a realignment of the entrance to the Fanshawe conservation area as well as Clarke Road. It opened to traffic in late 2020.

== Future ==
Widening the road between Oxford Street and Huron Street / Robin's Hill Road is in the City of London short term transportation objectives.

The City of London conducted a long-term transportation corridor protection study in 2001 and noted that the Veterans Memorial Parkway (then Airport Road) would serve as the city's eastern expressway when the city reaches its projected full build-out potential. In 2007, the City of London conducted an environmental assessment on potential interchange locations to be built along Veterans Memorial Parkway. Long-term plans have called for Veterans Memorial Parkway to be included as the eastern leg of a future London Ring Road. These proposals have been discussed since the 1960s but have yet to gain traction due to the requirement of land outside the cities boundaries. The eastern corridor for a ring road would use Veterans Memorial Parkway in the east, then continue north along Clarke Road. A western link would start at Highway 402 and head north between Westdel Bourne Road and Woodhull Road. The northern corridor is a major stumbling block since the lands needed within the city limits have been developed. The only available route possible would be outside of the city in Middlesex Centre. Although talks continue between both municipalities, only the province can approve the plan.

== Major intersections ==
The following table lists the major intersections along the Veterans Memorial Parkway. The City of London has assessed the entire length of the Veterans Memorial Parkway, identifying areas where interchanges can be constructed, grade separations can occur, and cul-de-sacs (replacing previously at-grade intersections for minor surface roads) can be placed. These changes would upgrade the Veterans Memorial Parkway from a partial control-access expressway to a fully controlled-access freeway for the majority of its length.

km	mi	Destinations	Notes
0.0	0.0	Wilton Grove Road	Construction began in September 2016 and finished in November 2017
1.0	0.62	Highway 401 – Windsor, Toronto	Formerly a trumpet interchange. Reconfigured to a Parclo from September 2016 to November 2017; Highway 401 exit 194
2.0	1.2	County Road 75 (Bradley Avenue)	Overpass planned, although a proposal for a parclo interchange is currently under review
3.7	2.3	County Road 29 (Hamilton Road)	Parclo A-4 interchange planned, alternative designs proposed
5.0	3.1	County Road 49 (River Road)	Overpass planned
6.2	3.9	County Road 25 (Gore Road)	Diamond interchange proposed
6.9	4.3	Tartan Drive	Cul-de-sacs proposed
7.6	4.7	Trafalgar Street	Diamond interchange proposed
8.2	5.1	Admiral Drive	Cul-de-sacs proposed
9.0	5.6	Dundas Street	Diamond interchange proposed; formerly Highway 2
9.7	6.0	Page Street	Cul-de-sacs proposed
10.4	6.5	Oxford Street	Diamond interchange proposed, access to London International Airport
12.2	7.6	Huron Street	Diamond interchange proposed
13.4	8.3	Clarke Road	Extension opened in Fall 2020; roadway continues as Clarke Road
1.000 mi = 1.609 km; 1.000 km = 0.621 mi: Unopened
