= Highbury Avenue =

Limited-access highway in London, Ontario

- Wenige Expressway; Formerly Highway 126
- A map of Highbury Avenue; Highbury Avenue Former Highway 126

Route information
- Maintained by City of London, Elgin County, Middlesex County
- Length: 45.6 km (28.3 mi)
- History: Created 19th century Extended/expanded December 9, 1963

Major junctions
- South end: Highway 3 and Centennial Avenue in St. Thomas
- Highway 401; Bradley Avenue; Commissioner's Road; Hamilton Road; Dundas Street (former Highway 2)
- North end: Highway 7 near Elginfield

Location
- Country: Canada
- Province: Ontario
- Counties: Elgin, Middlesex
- Major cities: St. Thomas, London

Highway system
- Ontario municipal expressways
(in alphabetical order)
← Harbour Expressway	Highbury Avenue	Highway 2A →
Ontario provincial highways; Current; Former; 400-series
← Highway 125	→ Highway 127

Highbury Avenue is an arterial road and municipal expressway located in the Canadian province of Ontario. In addition to serving as a primary north–south thoroughfare in eastern London – through which part of it is a limited-access freeway – the road also provides access to Highway 401 and continues south to St. Thomas. The southern terminus of Highbury Avenue is located at a roundabout with Highway 3; the eastern end of the St. Thomas Expressway, and Centennial Avenue. From there, it travels 45.6 kilometres (28.3 mi) north to Highway 7, east of Elginfield. Outside of London and St. Thomas, the road also passes through the communities of Ballymote and Bryanston. It is designated as Elgin County Road 30 within Central Elgin, and as Middlesex County Road 23 within Middlesex Centre, the two rural municipalities through which the route passes.

North of the Thames River, the road was laid out as part of the survey of London Township. It came to be known as the Asylum Side Road until being renamed Highbury Avenue in 1928. It was extended south of the river to Highway 401 as a four-lane freeway in 1963, which the City of London named the Wenige Expressway in 1965. Between 1963 and 1991, the section from Wilton Grove Road to Hamilton Road was provincially maintained and designated as Highway 126. In the 1990s, Highbury Avenue was continued south to St. Thomas along Hubrey Side Road and Radio Road.

== Route description ==
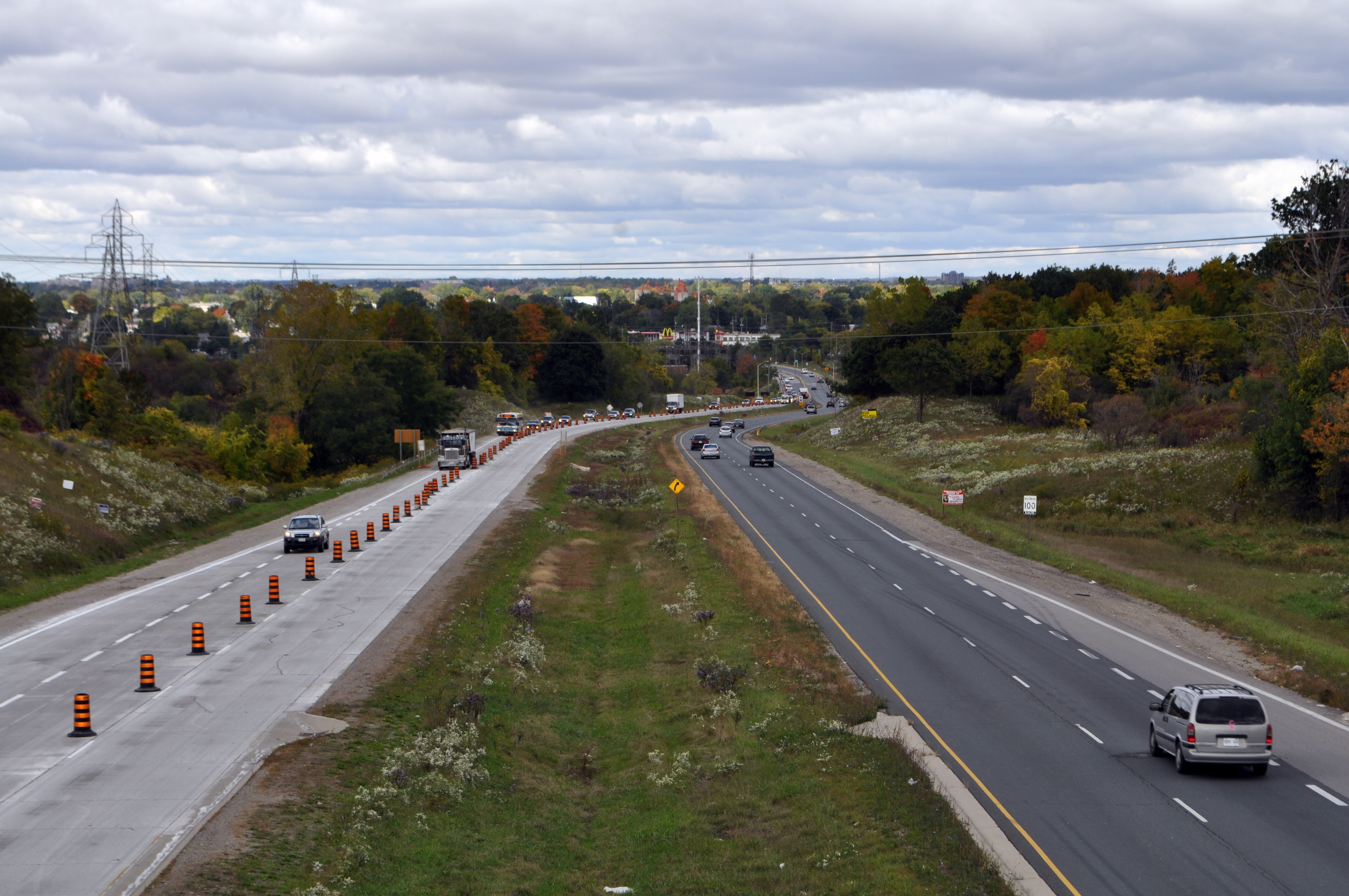

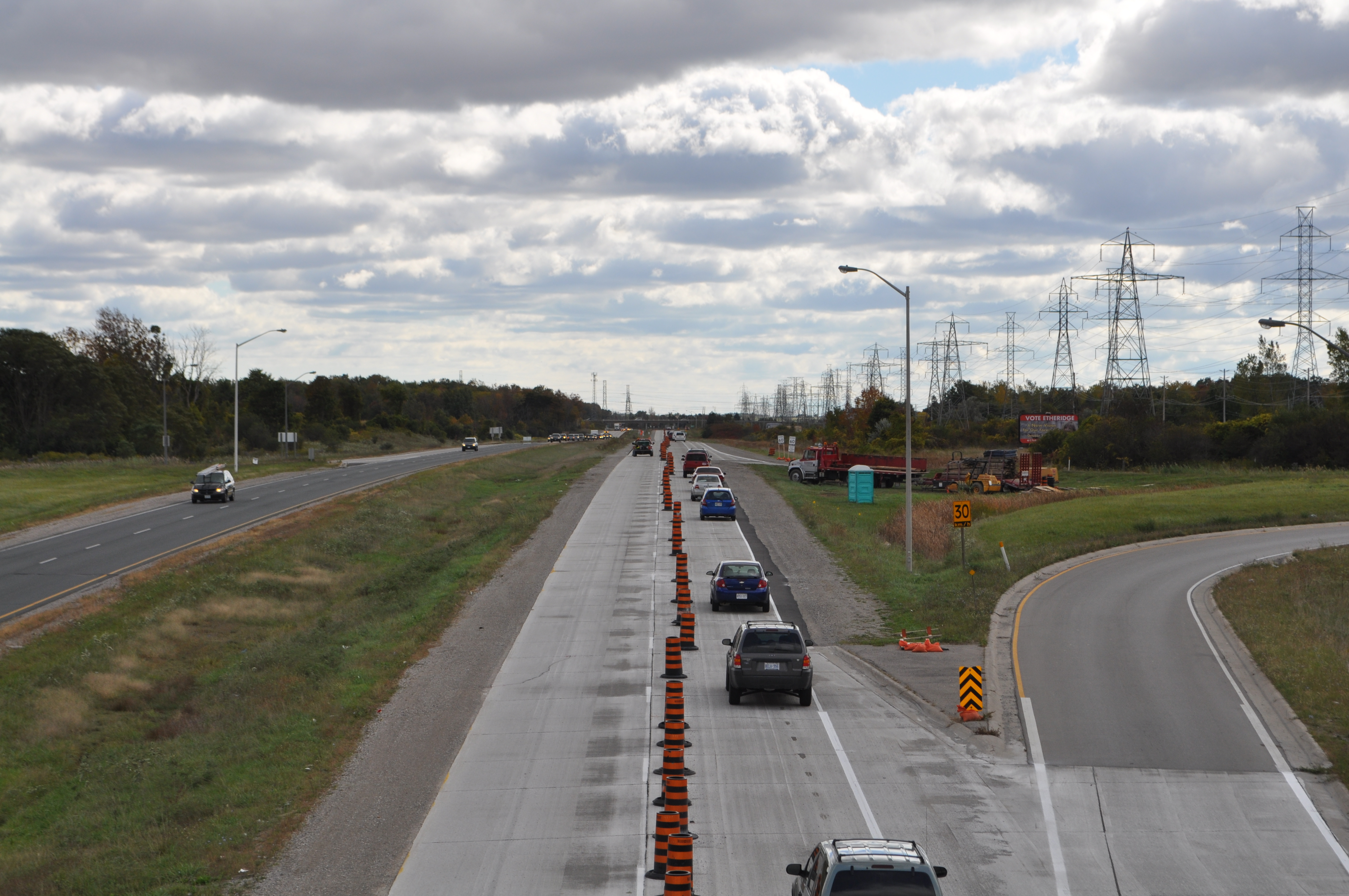
Highbury Avenue from the Commissioner's Road overpass, looking north and south respectively. The concrete southbound lanes were being rehabilitated at the time these photos were taken in 2010.

Highbury Avenue is a 45.6-kilometre (28.3 mi) road that travels north from St. Thomas, through London, to Highway 7, east of Elginfield. Located within Elgin County, Middlesex County and the City of London, it is classified as an arterial road throughout its length, with the exception of a 5.0-kilometre (3.1 mi) section between Highway 401 and the Thames River, which is classified as a freeway by the City of London.

Between St. Thomas and London, approximately 15,000 vehicles travel Highbury Avenue on an average day. This climbs to 48,000 vehicles at the Thames River crossing before gradually dropping to 30,000 vehicles at Fanshawe Park Road. North of there, traffic levels drop to 9,000–10,000 through Middlesex Centre.

=== South of Highway 401 ===
The southern terminus of Highbury Avenue is an intersection with South Edgeware Road, just north of Highway 3 and the eastern end of the St. Thomas Expressway. It travels in a straight line north as a two lane road through an industrial park on the outskirts of St. Thomas and crosses the Ontario Southland Railway tracks. The northeastern corner of a subdivision and a hydro corridor meet Highbury Avenue at the intersection of Elgin County Road 52 (Ron McNeil Line), after which the road enters the rural township of Central Elgin. Through Central Elgin, the road is designated as Elgin County Road 30.

Dipping into the Kettle Creek valley, Highbury Avenue passes the trailhead of the Dan Patterson Conservation Area at Mapleton Line. It crosses Salt Creek and Kettle Creek within the valley before returning to an agricultural setting at Elgin County Road 48 (Ferguson Line). Approaching the Elgin County boundary, the road swerves northwest as it transitions from the Lake Erie-oriented survey of Elgin County to the Thames River-oriented survey of former Westminster Township.

Highbury Avenue crosses from Central Elgin into the city of London at the intersection of Webber Bourne and Thompson Line, although the surroundings remain agricultural. It travels between farm fields for the next 8 kilometres (5.0 mi), with the LEED Certified London Southeast Pumping Station and Reservoir near the ghost village of Hubrey breaking the monotony. Leaving the farmland to cross two branches of Dingman Creek, Highbury Avenue widens to four lanes, and enters urban London at Wilton Grove Road, where it divides the Wilton Grove Industrial Park.

=== Urban London ===
Proceeding north, Highbury Avenue curves northwest as it crosses Highway 401 at Exit 189. North of that interchange, the opposing carriageways separate as Highbury Avenue transitions into a controlled-access highway. It curves back northward parallel to and east of high-voltage transmission lines before encountering an interchange with Bradley Avenue. It continues, sandwiched between the established neighbourhood of Pond Mills and the developing neighbourhood of Summerside, to an interchange with Commissioner's Road. It then begins to descend into the Thames River valley as it travels west of the Meadowlily Nature Preserve.

Crossing the Thames River and the Thames Valley Parkway recreational trail, the freeway portion of Highbury Avenue ends at Power Street, alongside the Highbury transformer station. It transitions back to an arterial road as it approaches Hamilton Road, with detached residences lining the route between Hamilton Road and Trafalgar Street. After crossing over the Canadian National Railway (CN) Dundas subdivision and passing the London Transit main office, it continues between residences and crosses the CN Guelph subdivision at grade. Between Dundas Street (former Highway 2) and Oxford Street, Highbury Avenue crosses over the Canadian Pacific Railway (CP) Galt subdivision and travels along the western side of the former London Psychiatric Hospital.

After passing to the west of Fanshawe College, Highbury Avenue travels through the neighbourhood of Huron Heights. It crosses the North Thames River, and reaches the London rural–urban fringe just north of the historic crossroad hamlet of Fanshawe at Stoney Creek. It narrows to a two-lane rural road and becomes surrounded by farmland north of there. Approximately 0.7 kilometres (0.43 mi) north of Sunningdale Road, it crosses from London into Middlesex Centre.

=== Middlesex Centre ===
Highbury Avenue travels north through the municipality of Middlesex Centre, where it is designated as Middlesex County Road 23. It bisects the communities of Ballymote at Middlesex County Road 28 (Medway Road), and Bryanston at Middlesex County Road 16 (Plover Mills Road). Otherwise, it is almost exclusively surrounded by farmland for the remainder of its length. It ends at Highway 7 (Elginfield Road), the boundary between Middlesex Centre and Lucan Biddulph, approximately 5.0 kilometres (3.1 mi) east of Elginfield.

== History ==
Highbury Avenue in 1965, shortly after it was extended south of the Thames River

North of the Thames River, what would eventually become Highbury Avenue was first laid out as a sideroad in the original survey of London Township. Mahlon Burwell began this survey in 1810, but its completion was delayed until after the end of the War of 1812. Because it connected to the London Asylum (opened 1870, later the London Psychiatric Hospital), the concession road came to be known as the Asylum Side Road. However, this name was apparently never official. As development in London crept eastward along Hamilton Road in the early 20th century, Highbury Avenue was adopted as the local name of the route near that crossroad as early as 1921. It became the official name of the entire route north of the Thames River in late 1928. South of the Thames River, no road existed before the 1960s between the present-day Green Valley Road, south of Highway 401, and Power Street, on the north bank of the river.

Plans to widen Highbury Avenue and extend it south to the new Highway 401 emerged in the late 1950s. In February 1958, a new four-lane overpass of the CPR north of Dundas Street was opened, replacing an old bridge that had existed since at least 1915. This was the first obstacle to widening the entire road as an eastern bypass of London. Later in the year, on September 9, Minister of Highways Fred Cass announced that pre-engineering work would begin on the Highbury Avenue extension to Highway 401 the following year. A contract to build a bridge over the Thames River was awarded in November 1960. Dinsmore Construction of Windsor was awarded a separate contract to grade and pave the extension in April 1962. Construction also began that year on an overpass of the CNR tracks north of Trafalgar Street.

The CNR overpass and Highbury Avenue extension were opened together by a motorcade ceremony on December 9, 1963. The extension was built by the Department of Highways (DHO), and was signed as Highway 126 from Wilton Grove Road to Hamilton Road. This became a contentious issue for the City of London, which had adopted a resolution in August of that year to name the extension the Wenige Expressway, in honour of nine-term mayor of London, George Wenige. Despite objections from the DHO, which preferred the readability of a number on signage for safety reasons, London ordered signs erected with the name in May 1965. However, the DHO prevailed and these signs were only installed along a 330-metre-long (0.33 km; 1,080 ft) section between Power Street and Hamilton Road. The signs remained in place until at least 1981, when it was described by a city traffic official as a "20-second expressway".

By the time construction had begun on the extension, proposals for a freeway to connect London with St. Thomas were also being considered. In October 1964, potential route locations for several controlled-access highways around London were revealed to Middlesex, Elgin and Oxford county officials. Among them were what would eventually become Highway 402, a link between London and St. Thomas, as well as a route around the northern edge of London. Several months later, deputy minister of highways, A.T.C. McNab, announced on May 19 that planning was underway on the London–St. Thomas link. The DHO-commissioned London Area Highway Planning Study, published in July 1966, examined traffic patterns and determined ideal travel lines and redundant routes. It confirmed the need for and priority of the new link, as well as continuing Highway 126 north then west to Highway 402.

Planning studies for the London–St. Thomas route were completed by 1968. The proposed route was presented to the public at the Western Fair on September 8, 1972, along with the St. Thomas Expressway. Ultimately, the St. Thomas Expressway would open alone on September 7, 1981.

With the outward growth of suburban London and the proposed annexation of Westminster Township in the early 1990s, responsibility for Highway 126 was transferred from the provincial government to the City of London effective June 12, 1991. That year also saw an interchange opened at Bradley Avenue. Later in 1994, the Highbury Avenue interchange and overpass at Highway 401 was reconstructed. The reconstruction led to the existing cloverleaf being converted to a parclo configuration with traffic lights. Highbury Avenue was extended south to St. Thomas circa 1999, along what was known as Hubrey Side Road within London, and Radio Road within Elgin County.

== Future ==
Work is currently underway to replace the bridge over the Thames River, which as of 2021 is 57 years old. Following completion, a CA$20 million contract is set to begin in late 2022 to rebuild the route south of the bridge to Highway 401. A cost–benefit analysis is being conducted to determine if a concrete or asphalt surface is better suited for the road.

== Major intersections ==
The following table lists the major junctions along Highbury Avenue.

Division	Location	km	mi	Destinations	Notes
St. Thomas		0.0	0.0	South Edgeware Road	To Highway 3
Elgin County	St. Thomas – Central Elgin boundary	2.1	1.3	County Road 52 (Ron McNeil Line) County Road 30 begins	St. Thomas city limits; Elgin County Road 30 southern terminus
Elgin County	Central Elgin	4.8	3.0	County Road 48 west (Ferguson Line)	
Elgin County	Central Elgin – London boundary	7.8	4.8	Webber Bourne west / Thompson Line east County Road 30 ends	London city limits; Elgin County Road 30 northern terminus
London		8.9	5.5	Glanworth Drive – Glanworth	
London		12.9	8.0	Westminster Drive	Ghost hamlet of Hubrey
London		15.6	9.7	Wilton Grove Road	Highbury Avenue widens to four lanes
London		15.9	9.9	Beginning of divided freeway	
London		16.5	10.3	Highway 401 – Windsor, Toronto	Signalized interchange; Highway 401 exit 189
London		17.6	10.9	Bradley Avenue	Interchange
London		19.6	12.2	Commissioners Road	Interchange
London		20.7	12.9	Wenige Expressway Bridge over the Thames River	
London		21.0	13.0	Power Street	End of divided freeway
London		21.3	13.2	Hamilton Road	
London		22.1	13.7	Trafalgar Street	
London		23.3	14.5	Florence Street	
London		23.6	14.7	Dundas Street – Woodstock	Former Highway 2
London		24.9	15.5	Oxford Street	
London		26.3	16.3	Huron Street	
London		29.0	18.0	Fanshawe Park Road	
Middlesex County	London – Middlesex Centre boundary	36.7	22.8	County Road 23 begins	London city limits; Middlesex County Road 23 southern terminus
Middlesex County	Middlesex Centre	31.9	19.8		Community of Ballymote
Middlesex County	Middlesex Centre	37.4	23.2	County Road 16 (Ilderton Road)	
Middlesex County	Middlesex Centre	38.8	24.1	County Road 16 (Plover Mills Road)	Community of Bryanston
Middlesex County	Middlesex Centre	45.6	28.3	Highway 7 (Elginfield Road)	
1.000 mi = 1.609 km; 1.000 km = 0.621 mi
