= 1993 Stanley Cup Final =

1993 ice hockey championship series

	1	2	3	4	5	Total
Los Angeles Kings	4	2*	3*	2*	1	1
Montreal Canadiens	1	3*	4*	3*	4	4
- * – Denotes overtime period(s)
- Location(s): Inglewood: Great Western Forum (3, 4); Montreal: Montreal Forum (1, 2, 5)
- Coaches: Montreal: Jacques Demers; Los Angeles: Barry Melrose
- Captains: Montreal: Guy Carbonneau; Los Angeles: Wayne Gretzky
- Referees: Andy Van Hellemond (1, 4); Kerry Fraser (2); Terry Gregson (3, 5)
- Dates: June 1–9, 1993
- MVP: Patrick Roy (Canadiens)
- Series-winning goal: Kirk Muller (3:51, second)
- Hall of Famers: Canadiens: Guy Carbonneau (2019); Patrick Roy (2006); Denis Savard (2000); Kings: Rob Blake (2014); Wayne Gretzky (1999); Jari Kurri (2001); Luc Robitaille (2009); Officials: Andy Van Hellemond (1999)
- Networks: Canada: (English): CBC (French): SRC; United States: (National): ESPN (Los Angeles area): Prime Ticket
- Announcers: (CBC) Bob Cole, Harry Neale, and Dick Irvin Jr. (SRC) Claude Quenneville and Gilles Tremblay (ESPN) Gary Thorne and Bill Clement (Prime Ticket) Bob Miller and Jim Fox

The 1993 Stanley Cup Final was the championship series of the National Hockey League's (NHL) 1992–93 season, and the culmination of the 1993 Stanley Cup playoffs. It was contested between the Los Angeles Kings and the Montreal Canadiens. It was the first appearance in the Final for the Kings and the first appearance since the 1920 Stanley Cup Final for a team based on the west coast of the United States. It was also the 34th appearance for Montreal, their first since the 1989 Stanley Cup Final. The Canadiens defeated the Kings in five games to win the team's 24th Stanley Cup. The year 1993 was the 100th anniversary of the first awarding of the Stanley Cup in 1893, and the first Finals to start in the month of June. To date, the 1993 Canadiens are the last Stanley Cup championship team to be composed solely of North American-born players, the last Canadian-based team to win the Stanley Cup, and the last Canadian team outside of Toronto to win a championship in one of the four major North American sports leagues.

The series is remembered for Kings defenceman Marty McSorley's penalty late in the third period of game two for using an illegal stick, in what proved to be the turning point in the 1993 Cup Finals. When McSorley entered the penalty box, Los Angeles held a 1–0 series lead, and a 2–1 score in the contest. The Canadiens then went on to score the equalizer on the ensuing power play, won game two in overtime, and then defeated the Kings in the next three games to win the Cup.

From the moment that McSorley was called for the penalty, the Kings failed to win another postseason game for the remainder of the 20th century, losing all the remaining games of the Finals, failing to qualify for the playoffs in five of the next seven seasons, and being swept out in the first round the other two times. Their next postseason win did not come until 2001, against the Detroit Red Wings. Meanwhile, the Canadiens did not appear in the Stanley Cup Final again until 2021.

== Paths to the Finals ==
=== Los Angeles Kings ===
Los Angeles had started the season well but faltered from December to February, though they managed to rebound and clinch a playoff spot. Superstar Wayne Gretzky sat out from October to January due to injury. Los Angeles did not have home ice advantage for all four playoff rounds, and was the only club to face Canadian teams in every round. To reach the finals, Los Angeles defeated the Calgary Flames in the Smythe Division Semifinals 4–2, the Vancouver Canucks in the Smythe Division Finals 4–2, and the Toronto Maple Leafs in the Campbell Conference Finals 4–3.

=== Montreal Canadiens ===
Montreal defeated the Quebec Nordiques (their provincial rivals) in the Adams Division Semifinals 4–2, the Buffalo Sabres in the Adams Division Finals 4–0, and the New York Islanders in the Wales Conference Finals 4–1. The Canadiens initially lost their first two games against the Nordiques, due in part to a couple of weak goals let in by star Montreal goaltender (and Quebec City native) Patrick Roy. Afterwards, a newspaper in Roy's hometown district suggested that he be traded, while Nordiques goaltending coach Dan Bouchard proclaimed that his team had solved Roy. The Canadiens then responded by winning the next four games to eliminate the Nordiques, then swept the Sabres and took the first three games against the Islanders, tying a record of 11 consecutive playoff wins set by the Chicago Blackhawks and Pittsburgh Penguins the year before.

The playoffs in both conferences saw numerous upsets, with the top teams in each conference – the Blackhawks and Penguins – being eliminated before the Conference Finals. The Campbell Conference saw the Blackhawks swept in the Norris Division Semifinals by the rival St. Louis Blues. Montreal's path to their first Cup Finals since 1989 became much easier after the Sabres swept the Canadiens' bitter rivals, the Boston Bruins, in the Adams Division Semifinals and the Islanders eliminated the two-time defending Stanley Cup champions (and the league's top regular-season team), the Pittsburgh Penguins, in the Patrick Division Finals. The Bruins had eliminated the Canadiens in the playoffs for three straight years, mainly due to Boston goaltender Andy Moog, who was often referred to as the "greatest Hab killer" the Bruins ever had. The Kings' path through the 1993 playoffs was similarly made easier as their nemesis, the Edmonton Oilers, who had eliminated the Kings from the playoffs in 1990, 1991, and 1992, failed to qualify for the playoffs for the first time since they joined the NHL in 1979.

== Game summaries ==
This was the last Stanley Cup Final series played in the Montreal Forum, and the last time Wayne Gretzky competed in the Finals. The Kings were appearing in the Finals for the first time in their 26-year history. They did not appear in the Finals again until 2012, where they faced the New Jersey Devils and won their first Stanley Cup. Montreal's victory is the most recent championship won by a Canadian team. They did not appear in the Finals again until 2021, where they lost to the Tampa Bay Lightning.

=== Game one ===
June 1	Los Angeles Kings	4–1	Montreal Canadiens	Montreal Forum	Recap

In game one at the Montreal Forum, the Kings jumped out to a 1–0 lead on Luc Robitaille's power-play goal at 3:03 of the first period. The Canadiens tied the game late in the first on Ed Ronan's goal at 18:09 (although it was merely a pass that Wayne Gretzky accidentally deflected into his own net). Robitaille would break the 1–1 deadlock with his second power-play goal of the game at 17:41 of the second period. Jari Kurri added an insurance marker off a Patrice Brisebois turnover at 1:51 of the third, and Gretzky sealed the 4–1 win for the Kings with an empty net goal at 18:02.

Scoring summary
Period	Team	Goal	Assist(s)	Time	Score
1st	LAK	Luc Robitaille (7) – pp	Alexei Zhitnik (9) and Wayne Gretzky (21)	03:03	1–0 LAK
1st	MTL	Ed Ronan (2)	Unassisted	18:09	1–1
2nd	LAK	Luc Robitaille (8) – pp	Rob Blake (6) and Wayne Gretzky (22)	17:41	2–1 LAK
3rd	LAK	Jari Kurri (9)	Wayne Gretzky (23) and Tony Granato (9)	01:51	3–1 LAK
3rd	LAK	Wayne Gretzky (14) – en	Tomas Sandström (16)	18:02	4–1 LAK
Penalty summary
1st	MTL	Lyle Odelein	Holding	02:42	2:00
1st	MTL	Gilbert Dionne	Hooking	06:12	2:00
1st	LAK	Kelly Hrudey	Delay of game	11:03	2:00
1st	LAK	Jari Kurri	Holding	15:54	2:00
2nd	LAK	Tony Granato	Goaltender interference	05:08	2:00
2nd	LAK	Dave Taylor	Roughing	06:23	2:00
2nd	MTL	Kirk Muller	Roughing	06:23	2:00
2nd	LAK	Marty McSorley	Unsportsmanlike conduct	07:16	2:00
2nd	MTL	Lyle Odelein	Unsportsmanlike conduct	07:16	2:00
2nd	MTL	Vincent Damphousse	Slashing	10:23	2:00
2nd	LAK	Corey Millen	High-sticking	17:23	2:00
2nd	MTL	Patrice Brisebois	Holding	17:23	2:00
2nd	MTL	Eric Desjardins	High-sticking	17:23	2:00
2nd	MTL	Patrick Roy	Delay of game	18:33	2:00
2nd	LAK	Wayne Gretzky	Hooking	19:32	2:00
3rd	LAK	Charlie Huddy	Hooking	06:41	2:00
3rd	MTL	J.J. Daigneault	Cross-checking	18:41	2:00

Shots by period
Team	1	2	3	Total
Los Angeles	11	20	7	38
Montreal	11	10	11	32

=== Game two ===
June 3	Los Angeles Kings	2–3	OT	Montreal Canadiens	Montreal Forum	Recap

The turning point of the series for the Canadiens came late in the third period of game two. With the Kings leading by a score of 2–1, Canadiens head coach Jacques Demers called for a measurement of the curve of Kings defenceman Marty McSorley's stick. The stick was deemed illegal and McSorley was given a two-minute minor penalty for illegal equipment. As it was late in the game and Montreal was facing the prospect of going to Los Angeles down two games to none, Demers pulled goalie Patrick Roy, producing a 6-on-4 advantage for the Canadiens. Montreal's Eric Desjardins scored from the point to tie the game at two and force overtime. Desjardins then scored his third goal of the game 51 seconds into overtime to give Montreal the win and the momentum heading toward games three and four at the Great Western Forum. Desjardins is the first and only defenceman to score a hat trick in the Cup Finals.

Reports suggested Canadiens head coach Jacques Demers knew which of the Kings' hockey sticks to challenge, thanks to a Montreal Forum employee assigned to the Kings' locker room who temporarily moved the Kings' portable stick rack to the Montreal's locker room. Demers has denied this and credited captain Guy Carbonneau with spotting McSorley's illegal stick.

Scoring summary
Period	Team	Goal	Assist(s)	Time	Score
1st	MTL	Eric Desjardins (2)	Vincent Damphousse (10) and Stéphan Lebeau (2)	18:31	1–0 MTL
2nd	LAK	Dave Taylor (3)	Unassisted	05:12	1–1
3rd	LAK	Pat Conacher (6)	Dave Taylor (5) and Tony Granato (10)	08:32	2–1 LAK
3rd	MTL	Eric Desjardins (3)	Vincent Damphousse (11) and Mathieu Schneider (2)	18:47	2–2
OT	MTL	Eric Desjardins (4)	Benoit Brunet (8) and Ed Ronan (3)	00:51	3–2 MTL
Penalty summary
1st	MTL	Lyle Odelein	Roughing	05:57	2:00
1st	LAK	Luc Robitaille	Hooking	06:40	2:00
1st	MTL	Patrice Brisebois	Roughing	07:05	2:00
1st	LAK	Rob Blake	Tripping	10:25	2:00
1st	MTL	Patrick Roy	High-sticking	10:38	2:00
1st	LAK	Tim Watters	Holding	13:01	2:00
1st	MTL	Kirk Muller	Tripping	13:01	2:00
1st	LAK	Darryl Sydor	Holding	14:44	2:00
1st	MTL	Mathieu Schneider	High-sticking	17:02	2:00
1st	LAK	Tony Granato	Holding	17:53	2:00
2nd	MTL	Kirk Muller	Cross-checking	00:35	2:00
2nd	LAK	Charlie Huddy	Cross-checking	04:20	2:00
2nd	LAK	Marty McSorley	Roughing	09:43	2:00
2nd	MTL	Vincent Damphousse	Roughing	09:43	2:00
2nd	LAK	Luc Robitaille	Roughing	16:02	2:00
2nd	MTL	Gilbert Dionne	Roughing	16:02	2:00
3rd	MTL	Benoit Brunet	Slashing	01:31	2:00
3rd	MTL	Vincent Damphousse	Cross-checking	02:30	2:00
3rd	LAK	Alexei Zhitnik	Tripping	04:17	2:00
3rd	LAK	Dave Taylor	Goaltender interference	11:56	2:00
3rd	MTL	Patrice Brisebois	Cross-checking	13:16	2:00
3rd	LAK	Marty McSorley	Illegal equipment	18:15	2:00
OT	LAK	Rob Blake	Misconduct	00:51	10:00

Shots by period
Team	1	2	3	OT	Total
Los Angeles	5	9	9	1	24
Montreal	16	12	11	2	41

=== Game three ===
June 5	Montreal Canadiens	4–3	OT	Los Angeles Kings	Great Western Forum	Recap

In game three in Los Angeles, the Canadiens jumped out to a 1–0 first period lead on a tip-in goal by Brian Bellows at 10:26, and Gilbert Dionne and Mathieu Schneider increased that lead to 3–0 at 2:41 and 3:02 of the second period. After a memorable check by long-time Kings defenceman Mark Hardy on Montreal's Mike Keane, the Kings fired back to tie the game in the second period on goals by Robitaille, Tony Granato and Gretzky. With time running out in the third period, Montreal captain Guy Carbonneau appeared to cover the puck in the goal crease, which with such little time remaining (12 seconds) would have resulted in a penalty shot for Los Angeles. But the referee ruled that the puck had been shot by a Kings player into Carbonneau's equipment, and so the period remained scoreless. After the series, the referee admitted that he had made a mistake on the call. The game went into overtime and Montreal's John LeClair scored the winner just 34 seconds into the extra period, giving the Canadiens their ninth consecutive overtime playoff victory.

Scoring summary
Period	Team	Goal	Assist(s)	Time	Score
1st	MTL	Brian Bellows (6) – pp	Kevin Haller (6) and Kirk Muller (6)	10:26	1–0 MTL
2nd	MTL	Gilbert Dionne (6)	Mike Keane (11) and Stephan Lebeau (3)	02:41	2–0 MTL
2nd	MTL	Mathieu Schneider (1)	Guy Carbonneau (3)	03:02	3–0 MTL
2nd	LAK	Luc Robitaille (9)	Wayne Gretzky (24) and Tomas Sandstrom (17)	07:52	3–1 MTL
2nd	LAK	Tony Granato (6)	Unassisted	11:02	3–2 MTL
2nd	LAK	Wayne Gretzky (15)	Mike Donnelly (7) and Mark Hardy (2)	17:07	3–3
3rd	None				
OT	MTL	John LeClair (3)	Kirk Muller (7) and Brian Bellows (9)	00:34	4–3 MTL
Penalty summary
Period	Team	Player	Penalty	Time	PIM
1st	LAK	Alexei Zhitnik	Tripping	04:23	2:00
1st	MTL	Brian Bellows	Cross-checking	05:21	2:00
1st	MTL	Eric Desjardins	Interference	07:40	2:00
1st	LAK	Tim Watters	Tripping	10:21	2:00
1st	MTL	Ed Ronan	Goaltender interference	13:09	2:00
1st	MTL	Stephan Lebeau	Slashing	16:37	2:00
1st	LAK	Rob Blake	Roughing	19:59	2:00
2nd	LAK	Dave Taylor	Slashing	11:42	2:00
2nd	MTL	Ed Ronan	Slashing	11:42	2:00
3rd	MTL	Stephan Lebeau	Holding	06:48	2:00
3rd	LAK	Tomas Sandstrom	Goaltender interference	10:50	2:00
OT	None				

Shots by period
Team	1	2	3	OT	Total
Montreal	12	9	12	3	36
Los Angeles	10	13	10	0	33

=== Game four ===
June 7	Montreal Canadiens	3–2	OT	Los Angeles Kings	Great Western Forum	Recap

Game four was a carbon copy of the previous game. Montreal bolted out to an early 2–0 lead, but the Kings fought back in the second period with goals by Mike Donnelly at 6:33 and McSorley on a power play at 19:56. As was the case in game three, the third period in game four ended up scoreless. Once again, it was John LeClair who was the hero for Montreal as he netted the overtime winner 14:37 into the extra period, banking the puck off the leg of sliding Los Angeles defenceman Darryl Sydor. In doing so, he became the first player since Montreal legend Maurice "Rocket" Richard in 1951 to score playoff overtime goals in consecutive games, and giving Montreal an NHL-record ten consecutive overtime wins in the 1993 playoffs.

Scoring summary
Period	Team	Goal	Assist(s)	Time	Score
1st	MTL	Kirk Muller (9)	Unassisted	10:57	1–0 MTL
2nd	MTL	Vincent Damphousse (11) – pp	Mike Keane (12) and Eric Desjardins (10)	10:57	2–0 MTL
2nd	LAK	Mike Donnelly (6)	Tony Granato (11)	06:33	2–1 MTL
2nd	LAK	Marty McSorley (3) – pp	Wayne Gretzky (25) and Luc Robitaille (12)	19:55	2–2
3rd	None				
OT	MTL	John LeClair (4)	Unassisted	14:37	3–2 MTL
Penalty summary
Period	Team	Player	Penalty	Time	PIM
1st	LAK	Pat Conacher	Cross-checking	01:53	2:00
1st	LAK	Tony Granato	Roughing	04:24	2:00
1st	MTL	Eric Desjardins	Roughing	04:24	2:00
1st	MTL	Mathieu Schneider	Elbowing	16:50	2:00
2nd	LAK	Mark Hardy	Holding	03:32	2:00
2nd	LAK	Marty McSorley	Misconduct	05:24	10:00
2nd	LAK	Warren Rychel	Goaltender interference	07:37	2:00
2nd	MTL	J.J. Daigneault	Roughing	07:37	2:00
2nd	LAK	Rob Blake	Roughing	12:09	2:00
2nd	MTL	Patrice Brisebois	Roughing	12:09	2:00
2nd	LAK	Darryl Sydor	Interference	15:58	2:00
2nd	MTL	Brian Bellows	Hooking	19:10	2:00
3rd	MTL	J.J. Daigneault	Cross-checking	02:42	2:00
3rd	LAK	Tony Granato	Roughing	19:30	2:00
3rd	MTL	Mathieu Schneider	Roughing	19:30	2:00
OT	None				

Shots by period
Team	1	2	3	OT	Total
Montreal	13	7	12	7	39
Los Angeles	6	11	15	10	42

=== Game five ===
June 9	Los Angeles Kings	1–4	Montreal Canadiens	Montreal Forum	Recap

Leading the series three games to one, the Canadiens headed back home for game five. After Paul DiPietro gave Montreal a 1–0 lead with a goal at 15:10 of the first period, McSorley tied the game for the Kings at 2:40 of the second period. The Canadiens' response was swift as Kirk Muller scored just 71 seconds later, and then Stephane Lebeau scored a power-play goal at 11:31 to give the Canadiens a 3–1 lead after two periods. DiPietro scored again at 12:06 to give Montreal a 4–1 lead. That ended up being the final score, with Muller's goal turning out to be the game winner. Gretzky did not manage a shot on net during the entire game.

With the win, the Canadiens won the series four games to one and clinched their 24th Stanley Cup championship. Montreal goaltender Patrick Roy won the Conn Smythe Trophy as the most valuable player of the Stanley Cup Playoffs for the second time in his career (he won it for the first time in 1986).

Along with the Toronto Blue Jays repeating as World Series champions, 1993 marked the first (and to date, only) year in which at least two championships of the four major North American sports leagues were won by Canadian teams.

Scoring summary
Period	Team	Goal	Assist(s)	Time	Score
1st	MTL	Paul DiPietro (7)	Gary Leeman (2) and John LeClair (5)	15:10	1–0 MTL
2nd	LAK	Marty McSorley (4)	Jimmy Carson (4) and Luc Robitaille (13)	02:40	1–1
2nd	MTL	Kirk Muller (10)	Vincent Damphousse (12) and Lyle Odelein (4)	03:51	2–1 MTL
2nd	MTL	Stephan Lebeau (3)	Mike Keane (13) and John LeClair (6)	11:31	3–1 MTL
3rd	MTL	Paul DiPietro (8)	Gilbert Dionne (6) and Lyle Odelein (5)	12:06	4–1 MTL
Penalty summary
1st	MTL	Mathieu Schneider	Tripping	04:35	2:00
1st	MTL	Mike Keane	Charging	10:46	2:00
1st	LAK	Tony Granato	Tripping	12:49	2:00
1st	LAK	Rob Blake	Roughing	19:23	2:00
1st	LAK	Tomas Sandstrom	Roughing	19:23	2:00
1st	MTL	Ed Ronan	Roughing	19:23	2:00
2nd	MTL	Gary Leeman	Tripping	05:32	2:00
2nd	MTL	Vincent Damphousse	Elbowing	07:40	2:00
2nd	LAK	Mark Hardy	Holding	10:28	2:00
3rd	None				

Shots by period
Team	1	2	3	Total
Los Angeles	7	7	5	19
Montreal	10	12	7	29

== Team rosters ==
Years indicated in boldface under the "Finals appearance" column signify that the player won the Stanley Cup in the given year.

=== Los Angeles Kings ===
#	Nat	Player	Position	Hand	Acquired	Place of birth	Finals appearance
4	(Canada)	Rob Blake	D	R	1988	Simcoe, Ontario	first
12	(United States)	Jimmy Carson	C	R	1992–93	Southfield, Michigan	first
15	(Canada)	Pat Conacher	C	L	1992–93	Edmonton, Alberta	second **(1984**)
11	(United States)	Mike Donnelly	LW	L	1990–91	Livonia, Michigan	first
21	(United States)	Tony Granato	RW	R	1989–90	Downers Grove, Illinois	first
99	(Canada)	Wayne Gretzky – **C**	C	L	1988–89	Brantford, Ontario	sixth (1983, **1984**, **1985**, **1987**, **1988**)
24	(Canada)	Mark Hardy	D	L	1992–93	Samedan, Switzerland	first
32	(Canada)	Kelly Hrudey	G	L	1988–89	Edmonton, Alberta	second (1984)
22	(Canada)	Charlie Huddy	D	L	1991–92	Oshawa, Ontario	seventh (1983, **1984**, **1985**, **1987**, **1988**, **1990**)
17	(Finland)	Jari Kurri	RW	R	1991–92	Helsinki, Finland	seventh (1983, **1984**, **1985**, **1987**, **1988**, **1990**)
29	(Canada)	Lonnie Loach	LW	L	1992–93	New Liskeard, Ontario	first
33	(Canada)	Marty McSorley – **A**	D	R	1988–89	Hamilton, Ontario	third **(1987**, **1988**)
23	(United States)	Corey Millen	C	R	1991–92	Cloquet, Minnesota	first
27	(Canada)	Marc Potvin	RW	R	1992–93	Ottawa, Ontario	first
20	(Canada)	Luc Robitaille – **A**	LW	L	1984	Montreal, Quebec	first
10	(Canada)	Warren Rychel	LW	L	1992–93	Strathroy, Ontario	first
7	(Sweden)	Tomas Sandstrom	RW	L	1989–90	Jakobstad, Finland	first
14	(Canada)	Gary Shuchuk	C	R	1992–93	Edmonton, Alberta	first
35	(United States)	Robb Stauber	G	L	1986	Duluth, Minnesota	first
25	(Canada)	Darryl Sydor	D	L	1990	Edmonton, Alberta	first
18	(Canada)	Dave Taylor	RW	R	1975	Levack, Ontario	first
19	(Canada)	Jim Thomson	RW	R	1992–93	Edmonton, Alberta	first
5	(Canada)	Tim Watters	D	L	1988–89	Kamloops, British Columbia	first
2	(Russia)	Alexei Zhitnik	D	L	1991	Kyiv, Soviet Union	first

=== Montreal Canadiens ===
#	Nat	Player	Position	Hand	Acquired	Place of birth	Finals appearance
29	(Canada)	Jesse Belanger	C	R	1991–92	Saint-Georges, Quebec	first (did not play)
23	(Canada)	Brian Bellows	LW	R	1992–93	St. Catharines, Ontario	second (1991)
43	(Canada)	Patrice Brisebois	D	R	1989	Montreal, Quebec	first
22	(Canada)	Benoit Brunet	LW	L	1986	Sainte-Anne-de-Bellevue, Quebec	first
21	(Canada)	Guy Carbonneau – **C**	C	R	1979	Sept-Îles, Quebec	third **(1986**, 1989)
48	(Canada)	J. J. Daigneault	D	L	1989–90	Montreal, Quebec	second (1987)
25	(Canada)	Vincent Damphousse	C	L	1992–93	Montreal, Quebec	first
28	(Canada)	Eric Desjardins	D	R	1987	Rouyn, Quebec	second (1989)
45	(Canada)	Gilbert Dionne	LW	L	1990	Drummondville, Quebec	first
15	(Canada)	Paul DiPietro	C	R	1990	Sault Ste. Marie, Ontario	first
34	(Canada)	Donald Dufresne	D	L	1985	Quebec City, Quebec	second (1989)
36	(Canada)	Todd Ewen	RW	R	1989–90	Saskatoon, Saskatchewan	first
14	(Canada)	Kevin Haller	D	L	1991–92	Trochu, Alberta	first
38	(United States)	Sean Hill	D	R	1988	Duluth, Minnesota	first
12	(Canada)	Mike Keane	RW	R	1986–87	Winnipeg, Manitoba	second (1989)
47	(Canada)	Stephan Lebeau	C	R	1988–89	Saint-Jérôme, Quebec	first
17	(United States)	John LeClair	LW	L	1987	St. Albans, Vermont	first
26	(Canada)	Gary Leeman	RW	R	1992–93	Toronto, Ontario	first
11	(Canada)	Kirk Muller – **A**	LW	L	1991–92	Kingston, Ontario	first
24	(Canada)	Lyle Odelein	D	R	1986	Quill Lake, Saskatchewan	first
37	(Canada)	Andre Racicot	G	L	1989	Rouyn, Quebec	first
5	(Canada)	Rob Ramage	D	R	1992–93	Byron, Ontario	second (**1989**)
32	(Canada)	Mario Roberge	LW	L	1991–92	Quebec City, Quebec	first
31	(United States)	Ed Ronan	RW	R	1987	Quincy, Massachusetts	first
33	(Canada)	Patrick Roy	G	L	1984	Quebec City, Quebec	third **(1986**, 1989)
18	(Canada)	Denis Savard – **A**	C	R	1990–91	Témiscaming, Quebec	first
27	(United States)	Mathieu Schneider	D	L	1987	New York, New York	first

== Stanley Cup engraving ==
The 1993 Stanley Cup was presented to Canadiens captain Guy Carbonneau by NHL Commissioner Gary Bettman following the Canadiens 4–1 win over the Kings in game five.

The following Canadiens players and staff had their names engraved on the Stanley Cup

1992–93 Montreal Canadiens

=== Players ===
Centres

- 21 Guy Carbonneau (C)
- 15 Paul DiPietro
- 18 Denis Savard (A)
- 25 Vincent Damphousse
- 29 Jesse Belanger*
- 47 Stephan Lebeau

Wingers

- 11 Kirk Muller (A)
- 12 Mike Keane
- 17 John LeClair
- 22 Benoit Brunet
- 23 Brian Bellows
- 26 Gary Leeman
- 31 Ed Ronan
- 32 Mario Roberge
- 36 Todd Ewen
- 45 Gilbert Dionne

Defencemen

- 5 Rob Ramage
- 14 Kevin Haller
- 24 Lyle Odelein
- 27 Mathieu Schneider
- 28 Eric Desjardins
- 34 Donald Dufresne
- 38 Sean Hill
- 43 Patrice Brisebois
- 48 J. J. Daigneault

Goaltenders

- 33 Patrick Roy
- 37 Andre Racicot
- * Did not officially qualify, but name still engraved on the Stanley Cup.

=== Coaching and administrative staff ===
- Ronald Corey (Chairman/President), Serge Savard (Vice President/General Manager)
- Jacques Demers (Head Coach), Jacques Laperriere (Asst. Coach)
- Charles Thiffault, (Asst Coach), Francois Allaire (Goaltending Coach)
- Jean Beliveau (Sr. Vice President-Director of Corporate Affairs), Jacques Lemaire (Asst. General Manager/Director of Player Personnel)
- Andre Boudrias (Asst. General Manager)
- Gaetan Lefebvre (Athletic Trainer)
- John Shipman (Asst. Athletic Trainer), Eddy Palchak (Equipment Manager)
- Pierre Gervais (Asst. Equipment Manager), Robert Boulanger (Asst. Equipment Manager)

=== Stanley Cup engraving ===
- #29 Jesse Belanger (C) – played in 19 regular-season games and nine playoff games but did not play in the finals. His name was included on the cup even though he did not qualify.
- #6 Oleg Petrov (RW) played nine regular-season games and one playoff game but was left off the cup and team picture. He spent the rest of the season in the minors.
- Montreal did not include Aldo Giampaolo, Fred Steer, Bernard Brisset (Vice Presidents), and Claude Ruel (Director-Player Development) on the Stanley Cup, even though there was more than enough room. In 1986, Montreal included three of their four vice presidents and Director-Player Development on the Cup. All members were awarded Stanley Cup Rings, along with scouts and other non-playing members.
- In 1992-1993, the NHL had a third Stanley Cup made: the Replica Stanley Cup. It is almost identical to the Presentation Stanley Cup. This Stanley Cup stays at the Hockey Hall of Fame and does not travel. It has no dents like the Presentation Stanley Cup. Most spelling mistakes were fixed, but a couple of new mistakes did appear on the Stanley Cup (See 1969 Stanley Cup Final, and 1973 Stanley Cup Final.) Many non-playing positions were spelled differently. 2 names were left off the Replica Stanley Cup 1954 Detroit: Hugh Colfin (See 1952 Stanley Cup Final), because he never played for Detroit; 1984 XXX'd Basil Pocklington because he was not a member of the Edmonton Oilers. Also, a new ring was made with the winners from 1979 to 1991 to exclude Basil Pocklington (See 1984 Stanley Cup Final), and 1981 Stanley Cup Final for a new mistake. The Replica Stanley Cup is on display only when the Presentation Stanley Cup is away from the Hockey Hall of Fame for about 250 days a year.

Included on the team picture, but left off the Stanley Cup.

- Stephane T. Molson (Secretary - Molson Family Foundation)†, Eric H. Molson (Chairman of the Board, The Molson Company Limited)†. Names are not on the Stanley Cup even though they qualified as owners of Montreal.

== Riot ==
The 1993 Montreal Stanley Cup riot occurred in Montreal after the Montreal Canadiens won their 24th Stanley Cup. People poured into the streets of the city and some began to commit acts of vandalism and violence while the Canadiens were celebrating inside the Montreal Forum. In the epicentre of the riot on Saint Catherine Street, stores were looted and police cruisers were set ablaze. The riot caused CA$2.5 million in damage (equivalent to $4.8 in 2025).

At the high point of the riot 980 officers were dispatched and they made 115 arrests. The police reported 47 police cars damaged, 8 of those 47 cars were completely destroyed. Rioters were arrested after they broke windows, looted stores and set fires. Some of the rioters were suspected of planning to loot stores using the Canadiens' victory celebration as a decoy. 168 were injured, including 49 police officers.

Because the Kings were the Canadiens' opponents, most of the Los Angeles news media, including the Los Angeles Times and the Daily News, also covered the riot; Times sports writer Helene Elliott was pressed into service as a news reporter minutes after the riot began.

== Television ==
In Canada, the series was televised in English on the CBC and in French on SRC. In the United States, the series was broadcast on ESPN. This was the ESPN's first Cup Finals coverage since 1988. However, ESPN was blacked out in the Los Angeles market because of Prime Ticket's local rights to the Kings games.

Preceded by Pittsburgh Penguins; 1992	Montreal Canadiens; Stanley Cup champions 1993	Succeeded by New York Rangers; 1994
