= Byron, London, Ontario =

Byron
- Neighbourhood
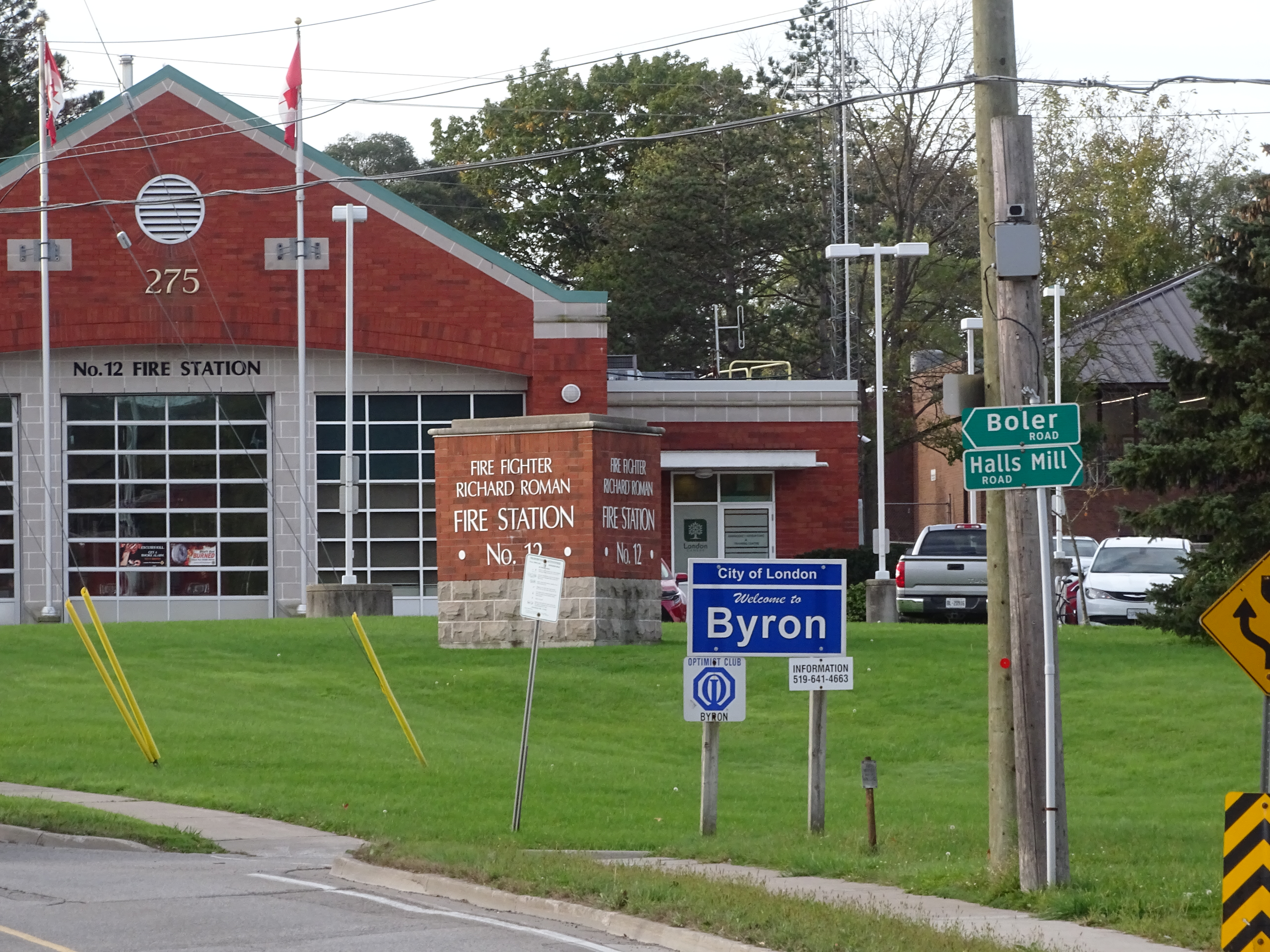

- Location within Middlesex County Location within Southern Ontario
- Coordinates: 42°57′14″N 81°19′56″W
- Country: Canada
- Province: Ontario
- City: London
- Settled: 1880 (as Westminster)
- Incorporated (village): 1804 (as Hall's Mill)
- Amalgamation (city): 1961 (as London)

Government
  - Type: Municipal (Ward 9)
  - Administrative body: London City Council
  - Councillor: Anna Hopkins
- Elevation: 254 m (833 ft)

Population (2011)
  - Total: 15,525
  - Average Income: $130,587
- Time zone: UTC-5 (Eastern Time Zone)
  - Summer (DST): UTC-6 (Eastern Time Zone)
- Postal Code: N6K
- Area codes: 519, 226

Byron is a neighbourhood in the City of London, Ontario, Canada. It is adjacent to the Thames River in the south-west of London. Almost all of its residents live in low-density, single detached dwellings. As of 2011, the area is home to 15,525 residents. The neighbourhood is considered a high-income area, with an average family income of $130,587 an average dwelling value of $312,896 and a home ownership rate of 93%.

== History ==
Byron was originally called Westminster, then renamed Hall's Mill, and then finally Byron; named for the poet Lord Byron. The Byron area was settled in 1800 and first became a village in 1804. Up until 1857 the community was known as Hall's Mills, for Charles Hall, post master. On March 7, 1961, it was annexed by the city of London and the population grew substantially with the development of large subdivisions around the original village.

== Government and politics ==
Byron exists within the federal electoral district of London West. It is currently represented by Arielle Kayabaga of the Liberal Party of Canada, first elected in 2021.

Provincially, the area is within the constituency of London West. It is currently represented by Peggy Sattler of the New Democratic Party, first elected in 2013 and re-elected in 2014, 2018, and 2022.

In London's non-partisan municipal politics, Byron lies within ward 9. It is currently represented by Councillor Anna Hopkins, first elected in 2014.

== Education ==
=== Elementary schools ===
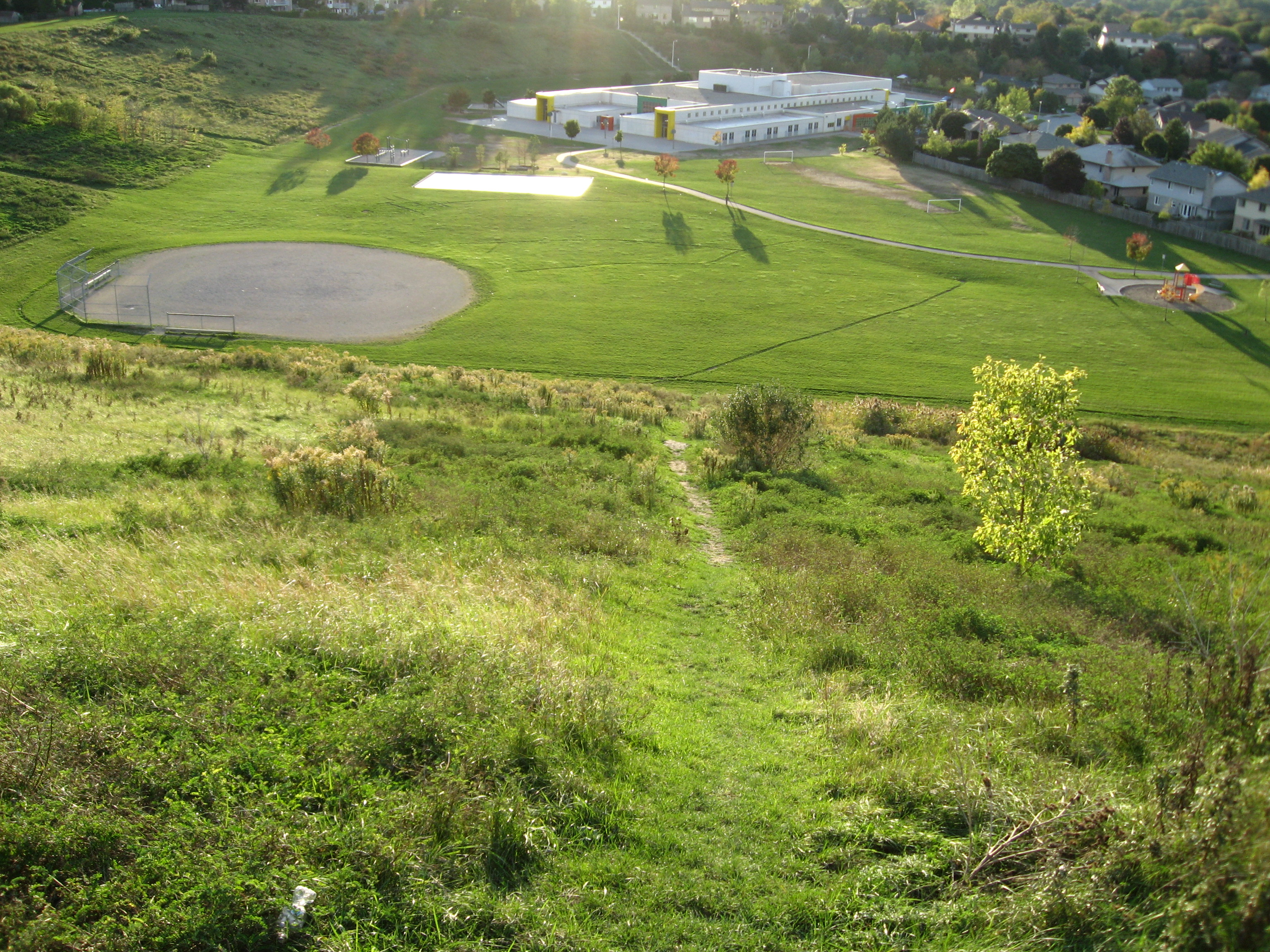
Byron Somerset Public School

There are six publicly funded elementary schools in Byron:

- Byron Northview Public School
- Byron Somerset Public School

Opened in the early 1990s, this school has 337 students in JK to Grade 8. It was built in a former gravel pit, excavated by AAROC Aggregates. Its architecture was by the firm Lamb, Jorden and Jensen, which later became Lamb and Jorden. Lamb and Jorden completed the project and supervised the construction.

- Byron Southwood Public School
- St. George Catholic School
- St. Theresa Catholic School
- St. Nicholas Catholic School

The first three schools are under the jurisdiction of the Thames Valley District School Board and the latter three are part of the London District Catholic School Board.

=== Secondary schools ===
There are no secondary schools located in Byron (a source of some consternation to residents, as a secondary school was originally promised by the city of London when Byron was annexed). Two publicly funded secondary schools serve the needs of Byron students. The nearest is St. Thomas Aquinas Catholic Secondary School in the London District Catholic School Board, to the north across the Thames River. This school primarily serves the needs of Roman Catholic students, though, as it is publicly funded, students of any religious denomination may attend. Most secondary school age students in Byron choose to attend Saunders Secondary School in the Thames Valley District School Board in the Westmount suburb of London. Though they do not live within the drawing area, a number of secondary school age children from Byron currently attend Oakridge Secondary School, located in the neighbourhood of Oakridge in London.

=== Private schools ===
There is one private (for profit) school in Byron. This is a Montessori pre-school, located on Commissioners Road between Grand View Ave and Chestnut Hill.

== Attractions ==
Byron is home to Springbank Park, a picturesque urban park and the largest in London. Within Springbank Park is Storybook Gardens, a popular children's attraction open year-round. Byron also has Boler Mountain, a small co-operative that offers skiing, snowboarding, snow-tubing, and mountain bike terrains.

Byron hosted two cycling events during the 2001 Canada Summer Games: the mountain biking event on Boler Mountain, and the road cycling event, where cyclists raced through the heart of the village.

== Infrastructure ==
=== Byron Telephone Company ===
Byron was served until August 1960 by the Byron Telephone Company, when it was sold to Bell Canada. A manual telephone exchange continued to operate until September 15, 1963, and in 1962 or 1963, the short code 471 was introduced to London exchange customers for the convenience of immediately reaching the Byron operator to complete a call. Upon dial introduction, 471 became the exchange prefix.

However, some two or three years before 1960, the Byron Telephone Company converted its Lambeth-area customers to a dial exchange, the OLiver 2 exchange.

== Location ==
The current boundaries of Byron are generally regarded to be the land south of the Thames River and west of Colonel Talbot Road. Recent housing developments have expanded Byron southward to Southdale Road and westward to Wickerson Road. Outside of the urban area, Byron is surrounded by farmland and forested areas. On the eastern border of Byron is the Byron Gravel Pit, the sixteenth-largest gravel pit in Canada. Historically, Byron also consisted of some land north of the Thames River in the area known today as Oakridge Park, including the Byron Bog (now Sifton Bog).

== Notable Byronites ==
- Megan Park, Actor
- Ron Calhoun, executive director of Partners in Research
- Jack McIntyre, hockey player
- Rob Ramage, hockey player and vehicular manslaughter convict
- Mike Van Ryn, hockey player
- Tim Tindale, American football player
- Andy Spruce, hockey player
- Tessa Virtue, Olympic figure skater
