= Ron Calhoun =

Canadian non-profit executive (1933–2020)

Ronald George Calhoun (24 June 1933 – 7 February 2020), born in Byron, Ontario, was a Canadian non-profit executive.

== Career ==
Calhoun was the National Co-ordinator for the Terry Fox Marathon of Hope, working with Fox to organize the original run in 1980. He coined the phrase "Marathon of Hope" for the event.

Calhoun has served in numerous other positions in charitable and educational organizations, including:

- National Fundraising Chairman at the Canadian Cancer Society
- member of the national board of directors at the ALS Society of Canada
- Ontario chair of the Canadian Diabetes Association
- chair of the Mogenson Trust in Physiology, University of Western Ontario
- London, Ontario-branch vice president of the Canadian Mental Health Association
- executive director of Partners in Research

== Recognition ==
- Certificate of Merit from the Canadian Cancer Society, 1977
- honorary life membership in the Canadian Cancer Society, 1987
- General Motors of Canada Gold Award, 1980
- Ontario Medal for Good Citizenship, 1996
- Queen Elizabeth II Golden Jubilee Medal, 2002
- entry in Canadian Who's Who, 2004
- Doctor of Laws (honoris causa) from The University of Western Ontario, 2011
- first recipient and namesake of the Ronald G. Calhoun Science Ambassador Award (Partners in Research), 2012
- Queen Elizabeth II Diamond Jubilee Medal, 2012
