= Rob Ramage =

Canadian ice hockey player (born 1959)

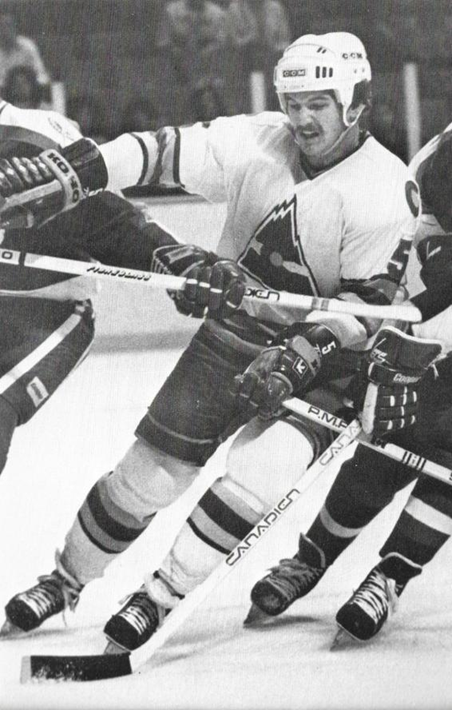
- Born: January 11, 1959 (age 67) Byron, Ontario, Canada
- Height: 6 ft 2 in (188 cm)
- Weight: 210 lb (95 kg; 15 st 0 lb)
- Position: Defence
- Shot: Right
- Played for: Birmingham Bulls; Colorado Rockies; St. Louis Blues; Calgary Flames; Toronto Maple Leafs; Minnesota North Stars; Tampa Bay Lightning; Montreal Canadiens; Philadelphia Flyers
- National team: Canada
- NHL draft: 1st overall, 1979; Colorado Rockies
- Playing career: 1978–1994

George Robert Ramage (born January 11, 1959) is a Canadian former professional ice hockey defenceman who played 15 seasons in the National Hockey League (NHL) for the Colorado Rockies, St. Louis Blues, Calgary Flames, Toronto Maple Leafs, Minnesota North Stars, Tampa Bay Lightning, Montreal Canadiens, and Philadelphia Flyers. He also played one season in the World Hockey Association (WHA) for the Birmingham Bulls. He was a two-time Stanley Cup winner in the NHL.

Ramage was born in Byron, Ontario, but grew up in London, Ontario. Ramage has four kids.

== Playing career ==
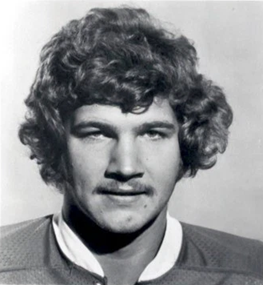
Ramage in 1978 headshot for Birmingham Bulls of the WHA

Ramage spent his junior career with the London Knights, playing three seasons as a defenseman, and was highly touted by many scouts. In his final season with the Knights, Ramage shared the OHL's Max Kaminsky Trophy as the league's most outstanding defenseman with his teammate Brad Marsh. His sweater number 5 was later retired by the team in his honour. Ramage's birthday fell 12 days too late to make him eligible for the NHL entry draft, though. Instead of returning to the Knights, Ramage elected to sign a contract with World Hockey Association's Birmingham Bulls, as the WHA allowed its clubs to sign players who were younger than 20 years of age. Ramage became a member of an informal group of young Birmingham players known as the "Baby Bulls", all of whom would go on to successful NHL careers. Ramage's WHA rookie year was very successful, at the end of the season he was named a First Team All-Star. At the conclusion of the 1978-79 season, four WHA teams joined the NHL, the rest (including the Birmingham Bulls) ceased operations. Ramage entered the 1979 NHL entry draft where he was selected first overall by the Colorado Rockies.

Ramage inadvertently became a part of history in his first season in Colorado. While the Rockies were playing the New York Islanders, the Rockies' goaltender left the ice for an extra skater after a delayed penalty was called on the Islanders. Before the penalty was called, the puck deflected off the chest protector of Islanders goaltender Billy Smith into the corner. Ramage picked up the puck and made a blind pass from the corner boards in the opposing zone to the blue line. Nobody was there to receive the pass, and so the puck sailed all the way down the length of the ice and into the Colorado net. Smith had been the last Islander to touch the puck, and so he became the first NHL goalie ever to be credited with a goal.

After three seasons with the Rockies, Ramage was traded to the St. Louis Blues in exchange for a first-round draft pick. With the Blues, Ramage developed into a steady and skilled defenseman. During the 1985–86 season, Ramage's fourth with the Blues, he posted a career-best 66 points (which was a Blues team record for points by a defenseman). He added 11 more in 19 playoff games as St. Louis made the Stanley Cup semi-finals, losing to the Calgary Flames in seven games.

Two years later, on March 7, 1988, Ramage was traded to the Flames, along with Rick Wamsley, for Brett Hull and Steve Bozek. The blockbuster trade gave the Flames enviable defensive depth by adding Ramage to a core that already boasted veterans Al MacInnis, Gary Suter and Brad McCrimmon. The following year Ramage was part of the team that won the Flames' first Stanley Cup, but had little time to celebrate before being traded to the Toronto Maple Leafs for a second-round draft pick.

Ramage was named the 13th captain in Maple Leafs franchise history, and remains the only player in team history to be named team captain before playing a game for the team. He played two years on the Toronto blue line before he was left exposed for the 1991 Expansion and Dispersal Drafts. As part of a complicated deal that saw the Minnesota North Stars' owners George and Gordon Gund awarded an expansion team in San Jose, they were permitted to raid the roster and farm system of their former club. As a result, a dispersal draft was held that allowed the North Stars to select players from the rest of the league and Minnesota used their first pick to pluck Ramage from the Maple Leafs. Ramage was disappointed to end his tenure with the Maple Leafs in such an ignominious fashion. "It was upsetting. I guess all athletes have a certain amount of pride and to be left unprotected is definitely a blow to that pride."

Ramage spent one season in Minnesota which was cut short when a knee injury required surgery, before finding himself once again on the unprotected list as the league was set to expand by two more clubs with franchises granted in Ottawa and Tampa Bay.

Ramage was selected by the Tampa Bay Lightning but failed to make much of an impression with the club as he struggled with just 17 points in 66 games. Despite his diminishing offensive returns, he was still a respected veteran around the league and was acquired by the Montreal Canadiens in a trade that sent youngsters Éric Charron, Alain Côté and future considerations (Donald Dufresne) to Tampa Bay. A sprained knee caused Ramage to miss the end of the season and the beginning of the playoffs but he eventually played in seven playoff games, helping the Canadiens defeat the Los Angeles Kings for the 1993 Stanley Cup.

The following year, 1993–94, Ramage returned to the Canadiens, but the defending champions had a deep team and the emergence of rookie Peter Popovic made him expendable so he switched teams for the final time in his career. Philadelphia acquired Ramage from the Canadiens for cash and he suited up for the final fifteen games of his career with the Flyers before retiring on July 26, 1994.

Ramage's name is on the Stanley Cup as a member of the 1989 Calgary Flames and the 1993 Montreal Canadiens. He also played in four NHL All-Star Games (1981, 1984, 1986, 1988).

== Personal life ==
He attended Byron Northview Public School and Saunders Secondary School in London, Ontario.

Up until January 23, 2009, Ramage was a broker at the Clayton, Missouri branch of Wachovia Securities (formerly A.G. Edwards & Sons, Inc. brokerage firm), acquired by Wells Fargo in 2009.

In December 2011, Ramage was named assistant coach of the London Knights after coach Dale Hunter left the team to become head coach of the Washington Capitals.

Ramage is married with three children. His son, John Ramage, was selected by the Calgary Flames in the 4th round of the 2010 NHL entry draft. John played NCAA Division I college ice hockey with the Wisconsin Badgers men's ice hockey, and he was named the USA team captain at the 2011 World Junior Ice Hockey Championships.

On July 30, 2014, Ramage re-joined the Canadiens organization, being appointed player development coach.

Rob is currently the head coach for the St Louis Blues Warriors.

== Death of Keith Magnuson and impaired driving conviction ==
On December 15, 2003, Ramage was driving former Chicago Blackhawks defenceman and coach Keith Magnuson to an NHLPA players' alumni meeting when his rented Chrysler Intrepid car swerved into the oncoming lane near Toronto and collided with another vehicle, killing Magnuson and injuring the driver of the other vehicle. Ramage was charged with impaired driving causing death and dangerous driving causing death. Defense lawyer Brian Greenspan claimed the blood and urine tests were flawed, and the smell of alcohol came from beer cans that exploded after the crash.

On October 10, 2007, Ramage, who had pleaded not guilty, was found guilty on all counts. The Magnuson family had forgiven Ramage and urged the judge not to send him to prison, instead suggesting that Ramage speak to teens about the dangers of drinking and driving. On December 3, 2007, in a Missouri civil suit, Ramage and National Car Rental of Canada were found liable for the death of Magnuson. The family of Magnuson was awarded $9.5 million. On January 17, 2008, Ramage was sentenced to four years in prison. Legal experts described the sentence as the harshest ever handed out in Ontario to a motorist with no previous record for drinking and driving. Ramage remained free on bail until his appeal of the sentence was denied on July 12, 2010.

In July 2010, Ramage began serving his sentence at Frontenac Institution, a minimum security facility in Kingston, Ontario, Canada. In March 2011, Ramage made his first application for day parole and release to a halfway house, but this request was denied. The board did grant him permission to leave the minimum-security prison for three-day unescorted absences once a month. The board cited its belief that Ramage did not yet understand the severity of the actions which led to his incarceration. Their concern centered on Ramage's drinking habits and whether he took responsibility for the crash. On May 5, 2011, Ramage's second request for day parole was granted. He is barred from drinking alcohol and he is restricted from visiting establishments where alcohol is the primary focus. Ramage must undergo psychological counseling and the court order prevents him from driving.

Originally Ramage was not eligible to seek accelerated parole because his crime was considered violent. The federal government is abolishing legal provisions that free some non-violent, first-time offenders as soon as six months into their sentences. Ramage's sentence expired in July 2014.

== Career statistics ==
=== Regular season and playoffs ===
			Regular season					Playoffs
Season	Team	League	GP	G	A	Pts	PIM	GP	G	A	Pts	PIM
1975–76	London Knights	OMJHL	65	12	31	43	113	5	0	1	1	11
1976–77	London Knights	OMJHL	65	15	58	73	177	20	3	11	14	55
1977–78	London Knights	OMJHL	59	17	47	64	162	11	4	5	9	29
1978–79	Birmingham Bulls	WHA	80	12	36	48	165	—	—	—	—	—
1979–80	Colorado Rockies	NHL	75	8	20	28	135	—	—	—	—	—
1980–81	Colorado Rockies	NHL	79	20	42	62	193	—	—	—	—	—
1981–82	Colorado Rockies	NHL	70	13	29	42	201	—	—	—	—	—
1982–83	St. Louis Blues	NHL	78	16	35	51	193	4	0	3	3	22
1983–84	St. Louis Blues	NHL	80	15	45	60	121	11	1	8	9	32
1984–85	St. Louis Blues	NHL	80	7	31	38	178	3	1	3	4	6
1985–86	St. Louis Blues	NHL	77	10	56	66	171	19	1	10	11	66
1986–87	St. Louis Blues	NHL	59	11	28	39	106	6	2	2	4	21
1987–88	St. Louis Blues	NHL	67	8	34	42	127	—	—	—	—	—
1987–88	Calgary Flames	NHL	12	1	6	7	37	9	1	3	4	21
1988–89	Calgary Flames	NHL	68	3	13	16	156	20	1	11	12	26
1989–90	Toronto Maple Leafs	NHL	80	8	41	49	202	5	1	2	3	20
1990–91	Toronto Maple Leafs	NHL	80	10	25	35	173	—	—	—	—	—
1991–92	Minnesota North Stars	NHL	34	4	5	9	69	—	—	—	—	—
1992–93	Tampa Bay Lightning	NHL	66	5	12	17	138	—	—	—	—	—
1992–93	Montreal Canadiens	NHL	8	0	1	1	8	7	0	0	0	4
1993–94	Montreal Canadiens	NHL	6	0	1	1	2	—	—	—	—	—
1993–94	Philadelphia Flyers	NHL	15	0	1	1	14	—	—	—	—	—
WHA totals			80	12	36	48	165	—	—	—	—	—
NHL totals			1,044	139	425	564	2,224	84	8	42	50	218

=== International ===
Year	Team	Event	GP	G	A	Pts	PIM
1977	Canada	WJC	7	0	1	1	6
1978	Canada	WJC	6	1	3	4	6
1981	Canada	WC	8	0	1	1	0
Junior totals			13	1	4	5	12
Senior totals			8	0	1	1	0

== See also ==
- List of NHL players with 1,000 games played
- List of NHL players with 2,000 career penalty minutes

Sporting positions
Preceded by Bobby Smith	NHL first overall draft pick 1979	Succeeded by Doug Wickenheiser
Preceded by Mike Gillis	Colorado Rockies first-round draft pick 1979	Succeeded by Paul Gagné
Preceded by Rick Vaive	Toronto Maple Leafs captain 1989–91	Succeeded by Wendel Clark
Preceded by Lanny McDonald	Colorado Rockies captain 1981–82	Succeeded by New Jersey Devils captains Don Lever
