= Saunders Secondary School =

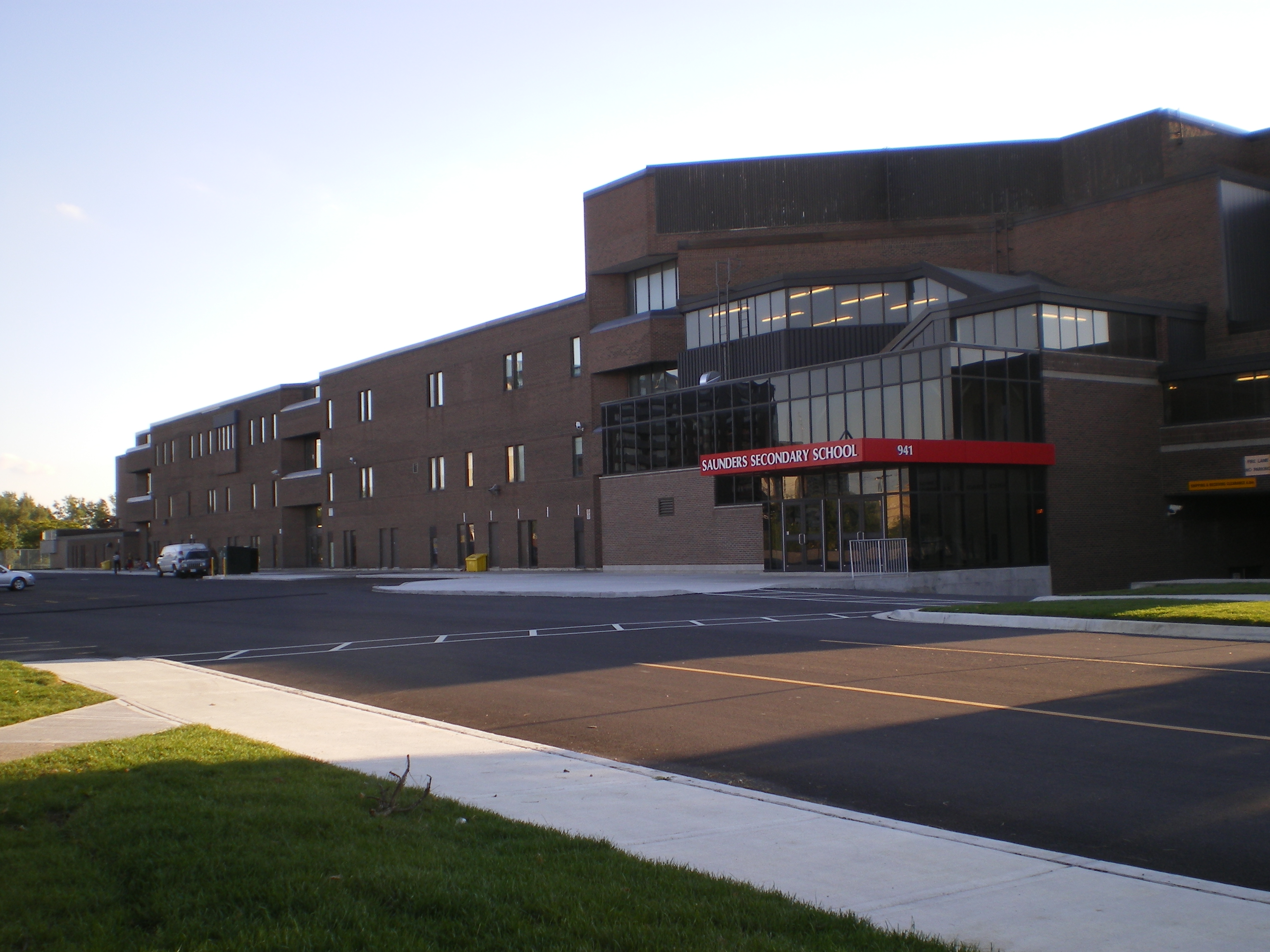

Location
- 941 Viscount Road; London, Ontario, N6K 1H5; Canada; 42.94590°N 81.29078°W

Information
- Funding type: Public
- Established: November 2, 1972
- School board: Thames Valley District School Board
- Superintendent: Barb Sonier
- Principal: Mary Saunders
- Enrollment: 1970 (September 2017)
- Campus: Urban
- Colours: Gold and red
- Mascot: Sabre tooth tiger
- Website: www.tvdsb.ca/Saunders.cfm

Saunders Secondary School is a public secondary school located at 941 Viscount Road in the Westmount suburb of London, Ontario, Canada. It is named after William Saunders. William Saunders was a Canadian pioneer and an authority on agriculture and horticulture. Grades offered are 9–12. Saunders' school colours are red and gold and its mascot is a sabre-tooth tiger. Saunders Secondary School is the largest high school in the Thames Valley District School Board with close to 2000 students and 120 teachers. As of 2008, Saunders is also the site of new credit summer school for the TVDSB.

== History ==
Classes for Saunders began in portables at Westminster S.S. in 1970. Construction of Saunders was completed in 1972. The school cost more than $8 million to build. The location caused many heated debates. The people of Byron, Ontario had been promised, upon amalgamation with the city of London, Ontario, a secondary school in their area so that their children would not have to be bused to the Westmount area. The chosen site for the multimillion-dollar school – right in the heart of the Westmount area, across the street from the Westmount Mall – greatly angered the Byron Area Secondary School Association. In spite of this, in January 1969, the London Board of Education approved the Westmount location for the school.

On April 18, 1994, arsonists set fire to Saunders forcing the evacuation and temporary closure of the school, as well as an extensive rebuilding of the rear part of the building. London Police subsequently charged three students with setting the blaze.

Saunders recently underwent an exterior renovation, the first new construction at the school in over three decades. A new entryway was added on the north-east corner of the building along with the fire escape stairs at the south and on the north-west corner of the school, contrasting modern with brutalist architecture.

In 2022, the district responded in an interview to claims that students felt unsafe at the campus due to incidents of violence.

== Tech programs ==
Current tech programs include: photography, broadcasting, electrical, computer engineering, woodworking, automotive, autobody, drafting graphic design, machine shop, welding and a newly added art welding course.

Saunders also offers courses in science, physical education, family studies, business and administration, computer programming.

== Musical theatre ==
Saunders is one of the only schools in the TVDSB that offers the musical theatre performance course, another being H.B. Beal. One difference between the two schools' programs is the rotation. While Beal takes a 2 show-break schedule, Saunders does a big show on the main stage, and then a smaller show in the drama studio, alternating each year. The shows that have been performed are:

- Little Shop of Horrors
- Godspell
- Snow White
- Chicago
- Groovy
- Bye Bye Birdie
- The Wedding Singer
- The 25th Annual Putnam County Spelling Bee
- Annie
- The Wizard of Oz
- Grease
- Fame
- Shrek the Musical
- Disaster! the Musical

== Sports ==
The senior boys' volleyball team won both TVRAA and OFSAA in AAAA for the fourth straight year in 2007, the only team in Ontario history to do so.

The Saunders junior football team won the city championships in 2007 for the first time in ten years.

Saunders Varsity Wrestling team won team championship for the second time in a row (2014–15)and (2020-2021). Boys TVRAA and OFSAA Champions. Also the Boys 3rd overall at OFSAA in 2016 and 7th overall as a school in 2020.

== Notable alumni and staff ==
- Josh Anderson, NHL player, Columbus Blue Jackets
- Miranda Ayim, basketball player, Canadian Women's Team, WNBA (2011–present)
- George Dvorsky, futurist, ethicist, and contributing editor at io9
- Remi Elie, OHL player Erie Otters, drafted in 2nd round by the Dallas Stars
- Tyler Hemming, professional soccer player
- Dane Fox, ECHL player Kalamazoo Wings, prospect of the Vancouver Canucks
- George Georgallidis, co-founder of eSports team Counter Logic Gaming
- Stuart Hughes, stage and screen actor and founding member of Soulpepper
- Patrick Kane, NHL player, 3-time Stanley Cup champion with the Chicago Blackhawks
- Chris Kelly, NHL player and 2011 Stanley Cup champion
- Adam Kreek, Canadian athlete and Olympian
- Mercedes Lander, drummer for Kittie
- Irene Mathyssen, former federal Member of Parliament, was an english teacher at Saunders
- Jay McNeil, former CFL player
- Corey Perry, NHL player
- Rob Ramage, former NHL player, Stanley Cup champion with the Calgary Flames and Montreal Canadiens
- Jude St. John, former CFL player, teaches at Saunders
- Tim Tindale, NFL player

== See also ==
- Education in Ontario
- List of secondary schools in Ontario
