= Gary Leeman =

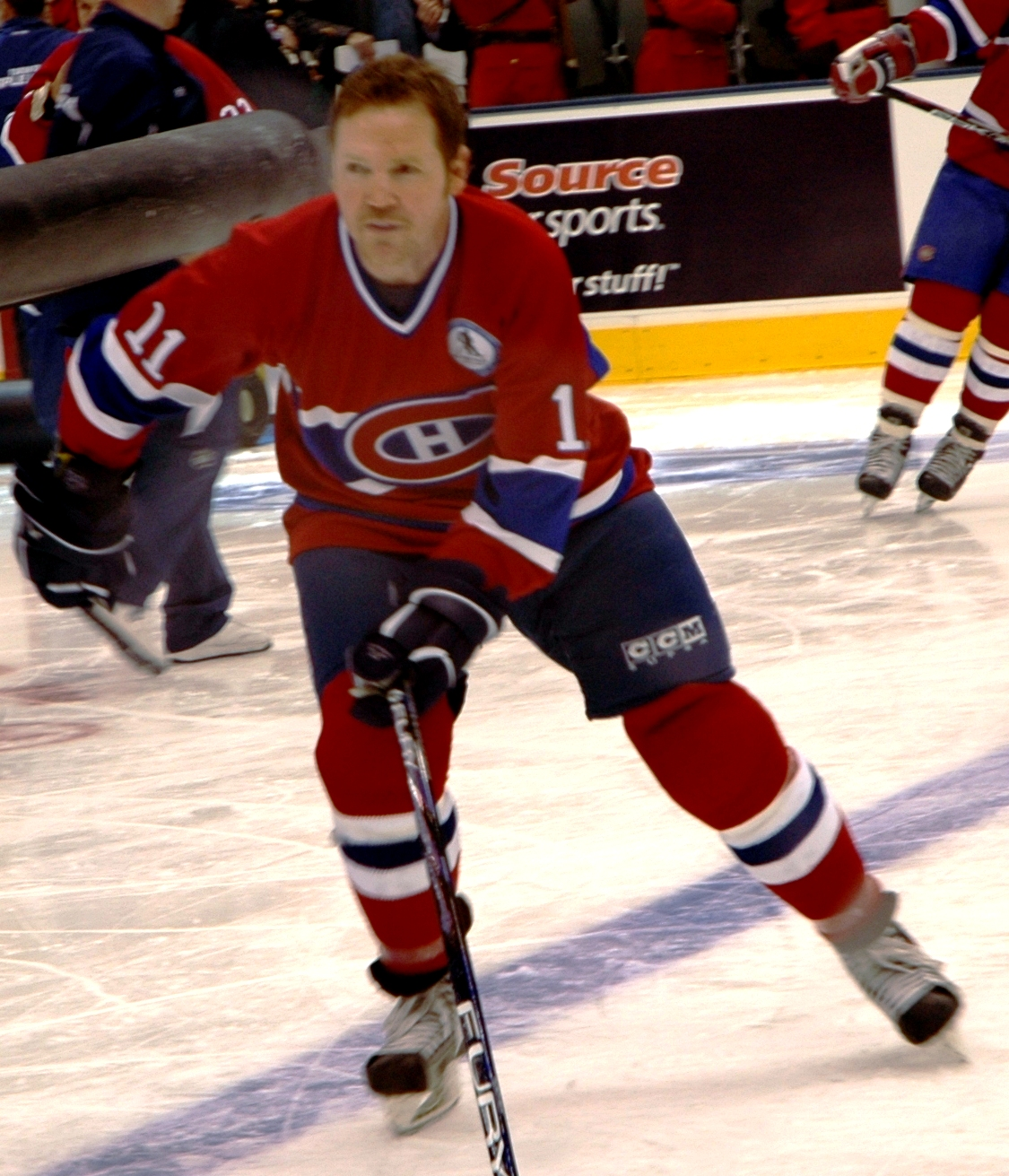
- Leeman in 2008
- Born: February 19, 1964 (age 62) Toronto, Ontario, Canada
- Height: 5 ft 11 in (180 cm)
- Weight: 175 lb (79 kg; 12 st 7 lb)
- Position: Right wing
- Shot: Right
- Played for: Toronto Maple Leafs; Calgary Flames; Montreal Canadiens; Vancouver Canucks; St. Louis Blues
- NHL draft: 24th overall, 1982; Toronto Maple Leafs
- Playing career: 1983–1999

Gary Spencer Leeman (born February 19, 1964) is a Canadian former professional ice hockey player in the NHL. In 1990, he became the second Toronto Maple Leaf player ever to score 50 goals or more in a single NHL season, after Rick Vaive did it in 1981-82.

== Playing career ==
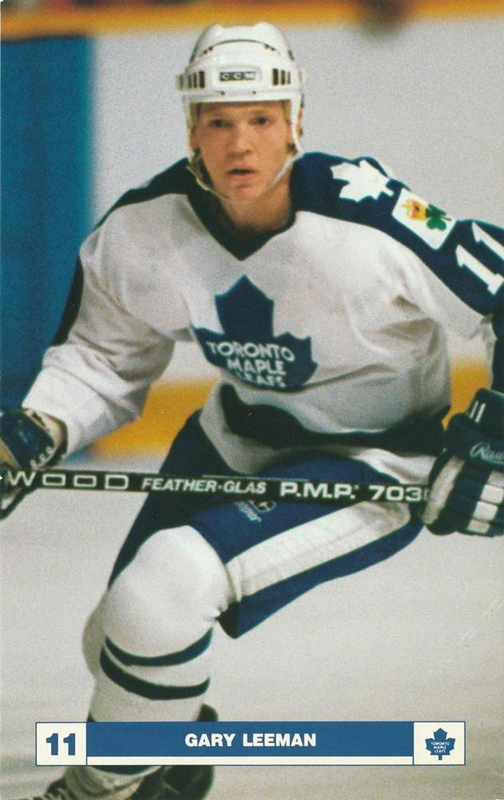
1987 postcard of Leeman for Toronto Maple Leafs

As a youth, Leeman played in the 1977 Quebec International Pee-Wee Hockey Tournament with a minor ice hockey team from Wexford, Toronto.

Leeman played for the Notre Dame Hounds Midget AAA team in Wilcox, Saskatchewan and was a standout defenceman for two seasons with the WHL's Regina Pats, where he was voted the league's Top Defenceman and a First Team All-Star.

Leeman was drafted 24th overall by the Toronto Maple Leafs in the 1982 NHL entry draft as a defenceman, and returned to junior for a season, where he scored 86 points in 63 games.

He also represented Canada at the World Junior Championships twice, in Leningrad and in Sweden.

Leeman converted to a winger in the NHL. He was best known as a speedy, gritty scoring machine and had a 50-goal season to his credit for the Maple Leafs. He formed the "Hound Line" along with Wendel Clark and Russ Courtnall while helping the Leafs come within a game of the semi-finals. Starting in 1986–87, Leeman was a top goal scorer with Toronto and had four straight 20-goal seasons.

After nearly nine seasons in Toronto, Leeman was the key player sent to the Calgary Flames in the January 2, 1992 blockbuster trade that brought Doug Gilmour to Toronto. To date, the ten-player deal is the largest in NHL history and, looking back, is seen as lopsided in favour of Toronto.

On January 28, 1993, Leeman was traded from the Flames to the Montreal Canadiens in exchange for Brian Skrudland. He won a Stanley Cup in Montreal in that season. He later played for the Vancouver Canucks and the St. Louis Blues. He played a total of 667 regular season games in the NHL, scoring 199 goals and 267 assists for 466 points.

Leeman finished his career in Germany's Deutsche Eishockey Liga for the Hannover Scorpions. He retired in 1999.

== Awards and achievements ==
- 1983 — WHL First All-Star Team
- 1993 — Stanley Cup championship (Montreal)
- 1989 — Played in NHL All Star Game (Toronto)

== Career statistics ==
=== Regular season and playoffs ===
| | | | Regular season | | | | | Playoffs |
| Season | Team | League | GP | G | A | Pts | PIM | GP | G | A | Pts | PIM |
|---|---|---|---|---|---|---|---|---|---|---|---|---|
| 1981–82 | Regina Pats | WHL | 72 | 19 | 41 | 60 | 112 | 3 | 2 | 2 | 4 | 0 |
| 1982–83 | Regina Pats | WHL | 63 | 24 | 62 | 86 | 88 | 5 | 1 | 5 | 6 | 4 |
| 1982–83 | Toronto Maple Leafs | NHL | — | — | — | — | — | 2 | 0 | 0 | 0 | 0 |
| 1983–84 | Toronto Maple Leafs | NHL | 52 | 4 | 8 | 12 | 31 | — | — | — | — | — |
| 1984–85 | St. Catharines Saints | AHL | 7 | 2 | 2 | 4 | 11 | — | — | — | — | — |
| 1984–85 | Toronto Maple Leafs | NHL | 53 | 5 | 26 | 31 | 72 | — | — | — | — | — |
| 1985–86 | St. Catharines Saints | AHL | 25 | 15 | 13 | 28 | 6 | — | — | — | — | — |
| 1985–86 | Toronto Maple Leafs | NHL | 53 | 9 | 23 | 32 | 20 | 10 | 2 | 10 | 12 | 2 |
| 1986–87 | Toronto Maple Leafs | NHL | 80 | 21 | 31 | 52 | 66 | 5 | 0 | 1 | 1 | 14 |
| 1987–88 | Toronto Maple Leafs | NHL | 80 | 30 | 31 | 61 | 62 | 2 | 2 | 0 | 2 | 2 |
| 1988–89 | Toronto Maple Leafs | NHL | 61 | 32 | 43 | 75 | 66 | — | — | — | — | — |
| 1989–90 | Toronto Maple Leafs | NHL | 80 | 51 | 44 | 95 | 63 | 5 | 3 | 3 | 6 | 16 |
| 1990–91 | Toronto Maple Leafs | NHL | 52 | 17 | 12 | 29 | 39 | — | — | — | — | — |
| 1991–92 | Toronto Maple Leafs | NHL | 34 | 7 | 13 | 20 | 44 | — | — | — | — | — |
| 1991–92 | Calgary Flames | NHL | 29 | 2 | 7 | 9 | 27 | — | — | — | — | — |
| 1992–93 | Calgary Flames | NHL | 30 | 9 | 5 | 14 | 10 | — | — | — | — | — |
| 1992–93 | Montreal Canadiens | NHL | 20 | 6 | 12 | 18 | 14 | 11 | 1 | 2 | 3 | 2 |
| 1993–94 | Fredericton Canadiens | AHL | 23 | 18 | 8 | 26 | 16 | — | — | — | — | — |
| 1993–94 | Montreal Canadiens | NHL | 31 | 4 | 11 | 15 | 17 | 1 | 0 | 0 | 0 | 0 |
| 1994–95 | Vancouver Canucks | NHL | 10 | 2 | 0 | 2 | 0 | — | — | — | — | — |
| 1995–96 | HC Gherdëina | ITA | 20 | 7 | 12 | 19 | 59 | 7 | 2 | 4 | 6 | 12 |
| 1996–97 | Utah Grizzlies | IHL | 15 | 6 | 1 | 7 | 20 | 4 | 0 | 3 | 3 | 4 |
| 1996–97 | Worcester IceCats | AHL | 24 | 9 | 7 | 16 | 21 | — | — | — | — | — |
| 1996–97 | St. Louis Blues | NHL | 2 | 0 | 1 | 1 | 0 | — | — | — | — | — |
| 1997–98 | Hannover Scorpions | DEL | 36 | 11 | 34 | 45 | 12 | 9 | 3 | 4 | 7 | 14 |
| 1998–99 | EHC Biel-Bienne | CHE II | 8 | 7 | 4 | 11 | 10 | — | — | — | — | — |
| 1998–99 | HC Sierre | CHE II | 1 | 2 | 1 | 3 | 0 | — | — | — | — | — |
| 1998–99 | Hannover Scorpions | DEL | 10 | 2 | 3 | 5 | 31 | 4 | 2 | 0 | 2 | 12 |
| NHL totals | | | 667 | 199 | 267 | 466 | 531 | 36 | 8 | 16 | 24 | 36 |

=== International ===
| Year | Team | Event | GP | G | A | Pts | PIM |
|---|---|---|---|---|---|---|---|
| 1983 | Canada | WJC | 7 | 1 | 2 | 3 | 2 |
| 1984 | Canada | WJC | 7 | 3 | 8 | 11 | 10 |
| Junior totals | | | 14 | 4 | 10 | 14 | 12 |
