= Gilbert Dionne =

Canadian ice hockey player (born 1970)

- Born: September 19, 1970 (age 56) Drummondville, Quebec, Canada
- Height: 6 ft 0 in (183 cm)
- Weight: 194 lb (88 kg; 13 st 12 lb)
- Position: Left wing
- Shot: Left
- Played for: Montreal Canadiens; Philadelphia Flyers; Florida Panthers
- NHL draft: 81st overall, 1990; Montreal Canadiens
- Playing career: 1990–2006

Gilbert Dionne (born September 19, 1970) is a Canadian former professional ice hockey left winger who played six seasons in the National Hockey League (NHL) from 1990–91 until 1995–96. He is the younger brother of Hockey Hall of Famer Marcel Dionne, who is nineteen years his senior.

== Early life ==
Dionne was born on September 19, 1970, in Drummondville, Quebec, as the youngest child of Gilbert Sr. and Laurette Dionne. Given the 19-year age gap between Dionne and his eldest brother Marcel, they did not grow up together and rarely saw each other. As a youth, he described Marcel as "my great brother that I never see."

== Career ==
=== Junior ===
As a youth, Dionne played in the 1982 and 1983 Quebec International Pee-Wee Hockey Tournaments with a minor ice hockey team from Drummondville. Due to his eldest brothers stardom, Dionne was often unfairly treated by coaches, opposing players, and fans. After experiencing a growth spurt at 15, Dionne left Quebec for Niagara Falls, Ontario. He left on Marcel's suggestion that he learn English and to further separate himself from his brothers reputation. After failing to make the Junior-A squad, Dionne was assigned to the Junior-B Niagara Falls Canucks. However, his skating was still a concern and he spent a year playing midget hockey before joining the Canucks. While living in Niagara Falls, Dionne attended École secondaire Confédération and learned English from his teammates. To further separate himself from his brother, Dionne did not tell anyone about his familal connections in his first year with the Canucks.

Following his rookie season, Dionne was drafted in the 19th round, 253rd pick overall, by the Kitchener Rangers in the 1987 Ontario Hockey League (OHL) Draft. Part of the reason for his late pick was that the Rangers expected Dionne to return to Montreal. In his second year with the Canucks, Dionne ranked ninth in the league with 36 goals and 84 points through 38 games.

=== Professional career ===
Dionne was drafted in the fourth round, 81st overall, by his hometown Montreal Canadiens in the 1990 NHL entry draft. Following the draft, Dionne signed a two-year, two-way contract with the Canadiens. He was then assigned to their American Hockey League (AHL) affiliate, the Fredericton Canadiens, for the 1990–91 season. He quickly established himself on the "Baby Habs Kid Line" with Patrick Lebeau and Jesse Bélanger. He scored seven goals by mid-November before being called up to the NHL level as a replacement for Brian Skrudland. He made his NHL debut on November 19 against the Quebec Nordiques. He rejoined the Fredericton Canadiens the following day. By January 1991, Dionne ranked among the top scorers in the AHL with 16 goals and 40 points. He earned another one-game recall on March 18 and skated in the Canadiens 4-2 loss to the Edmonton Oilers.

After showing up to the Canadiens training camp out of shape, Dionne was assigned to the Fredericton Canadiens to start the 1991–92 season. On December 22, 1991, Dionne was called up to the NHL level as a replacement for Mario Roberge. At the time of the call-up, Dionne was leading the AHL Canadiens in scoring with 19 goals and 27 assists. He scored his first career NHL goal on December 29, in a 3–1 win over the Edmonton Oilers. While playing with the NHL Canadiens, Dionne earned $135,000, a significant increase from the $33,000 he earned with Fredericton. He recorded his first career NHL hat-trick on February 26 against the Minnesota North Stars, which gave him 11 goals over 24 games. By the end of March, Dionne ranked among the top 10 in rookie scoring with 34 points and was named to the NHL All-Rookie Team. He scored two goals in his 1992 Stanley Cup playoffs debut against the Hartford Whalers.

In January 1995, Dionne upset his teammates after describing some as "playing like chickens with their heads cut off" to the media after he was made a healthy scratch. While he gave an apology to the team, it was a driving factor towards his trade to the Philadelphia Flyers on February 9, 1995. At the time of trade, Dionne had recorded three points in six games.

Overall, he played 223 career NHL games, scoring 61 goals and 79 assists for 140 points.

Sent down to the minor leagues thereafter, he remained a minor league star, playing seven more seasons in the American Hockey League and International Hockey League before closing out his professional career with two seasons in Germany.

=== Retirement and legacy ===
His jersey number (21) was retired by the Cincinnati Cyclones of the ECHL on December 2, 2006, in recognition of "Gilbert Dionne Day".

== Personal life ==
Dionne and his wife Heather have five children together.

== Career statistics ==
			Regular season					Playoffs
Season	Team	League	GP	G	A	Pts	PIM	GP	G	A	Pts	PIM
1986–87	Niagara Falls Canucks	GHL	17	9	6	15	16	—	—	—	—	—
1987–88	Niagara Falls Canucks	GHL	36	36	48	84	60	—	—	—	—	—
1988–89	Kitchener Rangers	OHL	66	11	33	44	13	5	1	1	2	4
1989–90	Kitchener Rangers	OHL	64	48	57	105	85	17	13	10	23	22
1989–90	Kitchener Rangers	MC	—	—	—	—	—	5	4	6	10	8
1990–91	Montreal Canadiens	NHL	2	0	0	0	0	—	—	—	—	—
1990–91	Fredericton Canadiens	AHL	77	40	47	87	62	9	6	5	11	8
1991–92	Montreal Canadiens	NHL	39	21	13	34	10	11	3	4	7	10
1991–92	Fredericton Canadiens	AHL	29	19	27	46	20	—	—	—	—	—
1992–93	Montreal Canadiens	NHL	75	20	28	48	63	20	6	6	12	20
1992–93	Fredericton Canadiens	AHL	3	4	3	7	0	—	—	—	—	—
1993–94	Montreal Canadiens	NHL	74	19	26	45	31	5	1	2	3	0
1994–95	Montreal Canadiens	NHL	6	0	3	3	2	—	—	—	—	—
1994–95	Philadelphia Flyers	NHL	20	0	6	6	2	3	0	0	0	4
1995–96	Philadelphia Flyers	NHL	2	0	1	1	0	—	—	—	—	—
1995–96	Florida Panthers	NHL	5	1	2	3	0	—	—	—	—	—
1995–96	Carolina Monarchs	AHL	55	43	58	101	29	—	—	—	—	—
1996–97	Carolina Monarchs	AHL	72	41	47	88	69	—	—	—	—	—
1997–98	Cincinnati Cyclones	IHL	76	42	57	99	54	9	3	4	7	28
1998–99	Cincinnati Cyclones	IHL	76	35	53	88	123	3	0	2	2	6
1999–2000	Cincinnati Cyclones	IHL	81	34	49	83	88	11	4	3	7	8
2000–01	Cincinnati Cyclones	IHL	80	23	43	66	46	5	0	2	2	0
2001–02	Krefeld Pinguine	DEL	57	15	26	41	26	3	0	1	1	2
2002–03	Hannover Scorpions	DEL	51	17	29	46	55	—	—	—	—	—
2003–04	Cambridge Hornets	OHA-Sr.	17	22	20	42	6	—	—	—	—	—
2004–05	Cambridge Hornets	OHA-Sr.	25	16	28	44	4	—	—	—	—	—
2005–06	Cambridge Hornets	MLH	19	11	24	35	8	—	—	—	—	—
NHL totals			223	61	79	140	108	39	10	12	22	34
AHL totals			236	147	182	329	180	9	6	5	11	8
IHL totals			313	134	202	336	311	28	7	11	18	42
