= VROC =

Canadian charity educational program

Virtual Researcher on Call (VROC) is a Canadian educational program administered by Partners in Research. The program connects students with knowledge partners, researchers, and professionals in health, natural sciences, technology, engineering and mathematics (STEM fields), using web-based technology.

== Video conferencing ==
Video conferencing technology is used to connect researchers and professionals in the STEM fields with elementary and secondary school classrooms for real-time, interactive discussion.

== Partners ==
VROC is partnered with over 40 universities, colleges and institutions as well as school boards across the country.

== Funding ==
VROC developed by Partners in Research at 2006 with funding from the Ontario government.

VROC began with a "Reaching Higher" grant from the Ontario Ministry of Training, Colleges and Universities in 2006 under the Dalton McGuinty government.

In 2011, Partners in Research was awarded a nearly million-dollar grant from the Federal Economic Development Agency for Southern Ontario to teach southern Ontarian students about careers in science, technology, engineering, and mathematics.

Partners in Research hosts a national annual awards reception and ceremony entitled The PIR National Awards to celebrate Canadian research in the STEM fields. Proceeds from this evening support the Virtual Researcher On Call Program.

== Recognition ==
In 2006 VROC was named a "New and Noteworthy Initiative" by the Canadian Education Association.

VROC was awarded the ORION Discovery Award of Merit in 2008.
