= Rob Blake =

Canadian ice hockey player and executive (born 1969)

- Hockey Hall of Fame, 2014
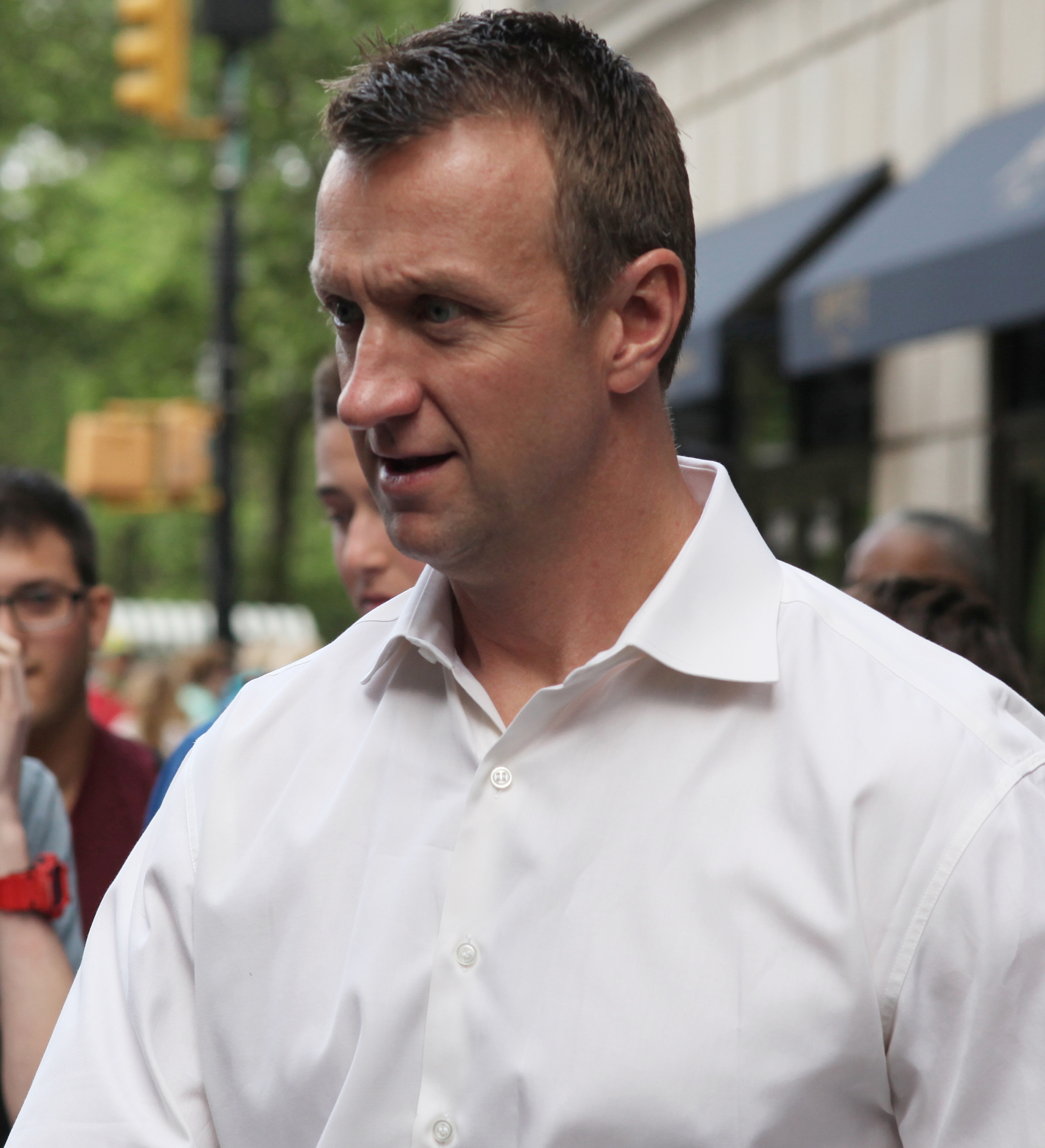
- Blake in 2014
- Born: December 10, 1969 (age 56) Simcoe, Ontario, Canada
- Height: 6 ft 4 in (193 cm)
- Weight: 220 lb (100 kg; 15 st 10 lb)
- Position: Defence
- Shot: Right
- Played for: Los Angeles Kings; Colorado Avalanche; San Jose Sharks
- National team: Canada
- NHL draft: 70th overall, 1988; Los Angeles Kings
- Playing career: 1989–2010
Medal record
Men's ice hockey
Representing Canada
Olympic Games
Gold medal – first place	2002 Salt Lake City
World Championships
Gold medal – first place	1994 Italy
Gold medal – first place	1997 Finland
Silver medal – second place	1991 Finland
World Cup
Silver medal – second place	1996 World Cup of Hockey

Robert Bowlby Blake (born December 10, 1969) is a Canadian former professional ice hockey player and currently the executive vice president of hockey operations for the Nashville Predators of the National Hockey League (NHL). He was originally drafted by the Kings in 1988, appearing in the 1993 Stanley Cup Final, winning the James Norris Memorial Trophy and serving as team captain for five seasons in his initial 11-season stint with the club. In 2001, Blake was traded to the Colorado Avalanche and was a member of their 2001 Stanley Cup championship team. After a two-season return to Los Angeles, Blake signed with the San Jose Sharks in 2008, retiring as its captain after the 2009–10 season. Four years later, in 2014, Blake was elected into the Hockey Hall of Fame. He won a second Stanley Cup as the assistant general manager of the Kings' front office in 2014.

Internationally, Blake played for Canada in three consecutive Winter Olympics in 1998, 2002, and 2006, winning gold in 2002 and becoming the 11th member of the Triple Gold Club. He was inducted into the IIHF Hall of Fame in 2018. Played college hockey at Bowling Green State University in Bowling Green, Ohio.

== Playing career ==
=== Los Angeles Kings (1990–2001) ===
Blake was selected 70th overall in the 1988 NHL entry draft by the Los Angeles Kings. He had completed his freshman year with Bowling Green State University of the Central Collegiate Hockey Association (CCHA) when he was drafted and went on to play three years total in the college ranks, earning CCHA and NCAA West first All-Star team honours in 1990. Blake was also the first player to ever receive the CCHA Best Offensive Defenseman award. Foregoing his final season of college eligibility, Blake joined the Kings for the final four games of the 1989–90 season before scoring 46 points in his NHL rookie campaign in 1990–91 to be named to the NHL All-Rookie Team.

After a 59-point campaign in his third season, Blake helped lead the Kings to the 1993 Stanley Cup Final, where they were defeated in five games by the Montreal Canadiens. The following season, in 1993–94, Blake improved to a career-high 48 assists and 68 points, but the Kings failed to qualify for the playoffs.

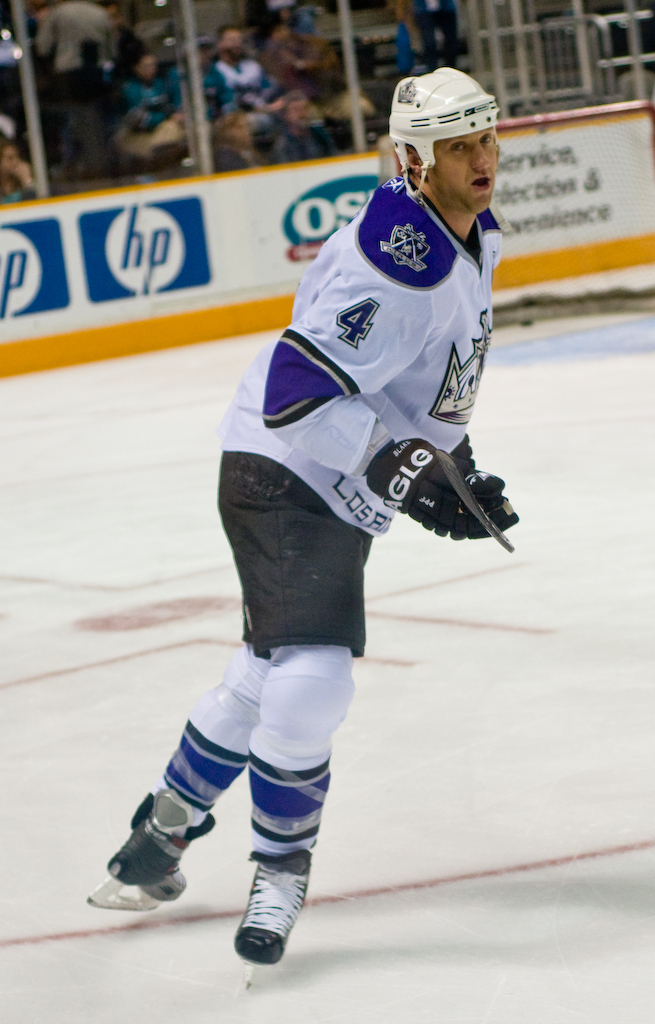
Blake in his second tenure with the Kings in 2008.

In a season where Blake was kept to just six games due to injury, the Kings traded captain Wayne Gretzky to the St. Louis Blues at the 1995–96 trade deadline, leaving the team's captaincy vacant. Blake was named the 11th captain in team history prior to the 1996–97 season. In 1997–98, Blake received the James Norris Memorial Trophy as the NHL's best defenceman after recording a career-high 23 goals to go with 50 points.

On February 21, 2001, with Blake declining to sign a new contract and about to become an unrestricted free agent in the 2001 off-season, the Kings traded him (with Steven Reinprecht) to the Colorado Avalanche for Adam Deadmarsh, Aaron Miller, Jared Aulin, and a first-round pick (used to select Dave Steckel).

=== Colorado Avalanche (2001–2006) ===
After 11 seasons in Los Angeles, Blake joined Colorado late in the 2000–01 season and made an immediate impact, scoring 10 points in the final 13 games of the regular season after being traded. In the 2001 playoffs, he played a second-round series against his former club, the Kings, before he won his first and only Stanley Cup with the Avalanche, adding 19 points in 23 playoff games. In totaling 59 points in 67 games in the regular season, Blake was selected to the NHL second All-Star team.

On July 1, 2001, Blake re-signed with the Avalanche in the off-season to a five-year contract with an optional sixth year. As the Avalanche's top defenceman, Blake recorded his highest total with the Avalanche in recording 56 points in 75 games, third amongst NHL defenceman, in the 2001–02 season, before falling in their defence of the Stanley Cup in the Western Conference finals to the Detroit Red Wings. For his third successive season, Blake was selected to the NHL second All-Star team.

In the following 2002–03 season, Blake recorded his 500th career point against the Minnesota Wild on October 29, 2002. In finishing fifth in Norris Trophy voting, Blake placed second amongst Avalanche defenceman with 45 points in 79 games. In each of his first three seasons with the Avalanche, he was selected to the NHL All-Star Game, and in the 2003–04 campaign, he was selected as a starter for the 2004 All-Star Game in Saint Paul, Minnesota. He finished the season with the Avalanche, placing ninth in the NHL amongst defenceman with 46 points.

After losing a season to the 2004–05 NHL lockout, Blake returned for his final season under contract with the Avalanche in 2005–06. He continued his scoring presence amongst the Avalanche in recording 51 points in 81 games, the seventh time in his career he surpassed the 50-point plateau. On April 3, 2006, against the Chicago Blackhawks, he scored his 200th career NHL goal to become just the 17th defenceman all-time to reach the mark.

=== Return to Los Angeles (2006–2008) ===
After five years with Colorado, the Avalanche did not pick up his option for the 2006–07 season, making him a free agent. On July 1, 2006, he re-signed with his former team, the Los Angeles Kings, for two years at $6 million per year.

Coming off a 51-point campaign with Colorado the previous year, Blake's production dipped upon his return to Los Angeles. He recorded 34 points in 2006–07, his lowest total since 1996–97. Nevertheless, prior to the start of the 2007–08 season, Blake was renamed team captain on September 28, 2007, after Mattias Norström's departure to the Dallas Stars.

=== San Jose Sharks (2008–2010) ===
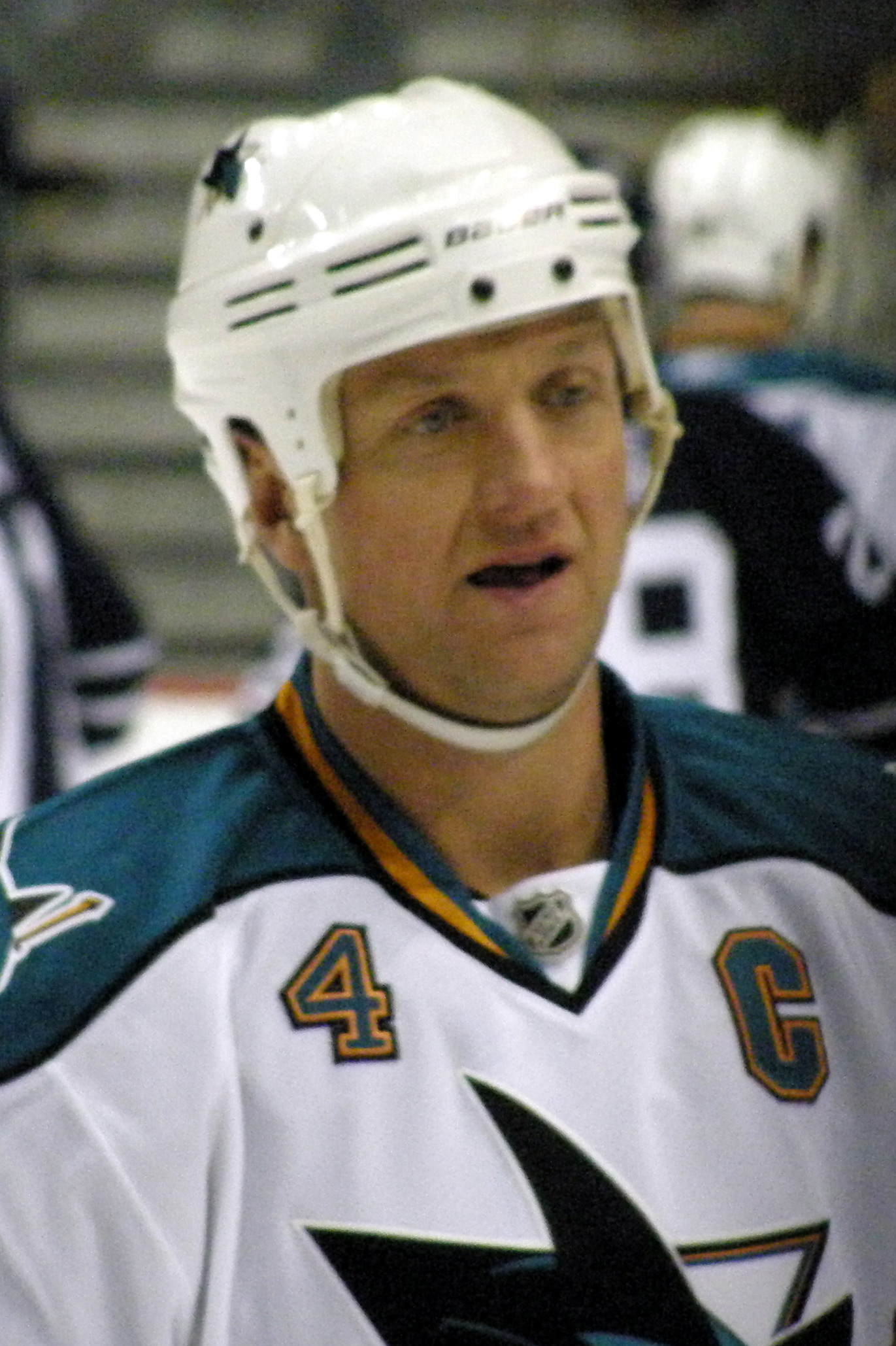
Blake with the San Jose Sharks.

After again becoming an unrestricted free agent, on July 3, 2008, Blake signed a one-year, US$5 million contract with the Kings' Pacific Division rival San Jose Sharks. Blake reached the 40-point plateau once more with the Sharks, tallying 10 goals and 35 assists in his first season in San Jose.

Blake extended his contract with the Sharks, re-signing for another year at $3.5 million to avoid free agency. Blake would be named captain of the Sharks approximately six weeks after previous captain Patrick Marleau was stripped of the role by Sharks management.

== Retirement ==
On June 18, 2010, Blake announced his final retirement from professional hockey. On March 3, 2011, during a Los Angeles Kings telecast, Blake discussed his post-playing career as a hockey operations manager for the NHL, based in Toronto. Blake said, "This job kind of developed over the summer (of 2010) in talking with Brendan Shanahan. I played for a while in the NHL (20 years). As a former player, I can provide the league with some insight in various aspects of the game. I was able to stay on the West Coast (and commute to Toronto for work), so it worked out really well." He continued, "I watch the game much differently now, just because I've been in Toronto, in the war room. Now, I watch the game and see the calls that are made as well as the ones which weren't but should have been."

On August 11, 2014, the Los Angeles Kings announced they would be retiring Blake's number 4 jersey on January 17, 2015. He was later selected to the Colorado Avalanche's 20th anniversary team honoured on December 8, 2015.

== Executive career ==
Before the 2013–14 season, the Los Angeles Kings hired Blake as assistant general manager. The Kings won the Stanley Cup in his first year. As the assistant general manager to the Kings, he also acted as the general manager for their American Hockey League (AHL) affiliates, the Manchester Monarchs (2013–2015) and the Ontario Reign (2015–).

Blake was also selected by Hockey Canada to be their general manager for the 2014 IIHF World Championship.

On April 10, 2017, the Kings named Blake the vice-president and general manager of the team. In eight seasons as general manager, Blake led the Kings to the playoffs five times; however, the team never advanced past the first round, including four consecutive series losses to the Edmonton Oilers from 2022 to 2025. On May 5, 2025, following the fourth loss, Blake and the Kings mutually parted ways.

On June 5, 2026, Blake was named executive vice president of hockey operations for the Nashville Predators. This came two days after Chris MacFarland was named the team's president and general manager.. The Predators announced that "Blake will work alongside MacFarland in all areas of the hockey operations department, including team and staff development, long- and short-term strategies, free agency, player recruitment, drafting and more."

== Personal life ==
Blake and his wife Brandy have three children, sons Jack and Max, and daughter Brooke. His best friend is former NHL goaltender Dwayne Roloson, with whom he grew up playing hockey in Simcoe, Ontario. He is also distantly related to Hall of Famer Red Kelly. In 2008, Blake appeared in the Mike Myers film The Love Guru as himself. A short street in his hometown of Simcoe, Rob Blake Way, is named after him.

== Career statistics ==
=== Regular season and playoffs ===
			Regular season					Playoffs
Season	Team	League	GP	G	A	Pts	PIM	GP	G	A	Pts	PIM
1985–86	Brantford Classics	GHL	39	3	13	16	43	—	—	—	—	—
1986–87	Stratford Cullitons	MWJHL	31	11	20	31	115	—	—	—	—	—
1987–88	Bowling Green Falcons	CCHA	43	5	8	13	88	—	—	—	—	—
1988–89	Bowling Green Falcons	CCHA	46	11	21	32	140	—	—	—	—	—
1989–90	Bowling Green Falcons	CCHA	42	23	36	59	140	—	—	—	—	—
1989–90	Los Angeles Kings	NHL	4	0	0	0	4	8	1	3	4	4
1990–91	Los Angeles Kings	NHL	75	12	34	46	125	12	1	4	5	26
1991–92	Los Angeles Kings	NHL	57	7	13	20	102	6	2	1	3	12
1992–93	Los Angeles Kings	NHL	76	16	43	59	152	23	4	6	10	46
1993–94	Los Angeles Kings	NHL	84	20	48	68	137	—	—	—	—	—
1994–95	Los Angeles Kings	NHL	24	4	7	11	38	—	—	—	—	—
1995–96	Los Angeles Kings	NHL	6	1	2	3	8	—	—	—	—	—
1996–97	Los Angeles Kings	NHL	62	8	23	31	82	—	—	—	—	—
1997–98	Los Angeles Kings	NHL	81	23	27	50	94	4	0	0	0	6
1998–99	Los Angeles Kings	NHL	62	12	23	35	128	—	—	—	—	—
1999–00	Los Angeles Kings	NHL	77	18	39	57	112	4	0	2	2	4
2000–01	Los Angeles Kings	NHL	54	17	32	49	69	—	—	—	—	—
2000–01	Colorado Avalanche	NHL	13	2	8	10	8	23	6	13	19	16
2001–02	Colorado Avalanche	NHL	75	16	40	56	58	20	6	6	12	16
2002–03	Colorado Avalanche	NHL	79	17	28	45	57	7	1	2	3	8
2003–04	Colorado Avalanche	NHL	74	13	33	46	61	9	0	5	5	6
2005–06	Colorado Avalanche	NHL	81	14	37	51	94	9	3	1	4	8
2006–07	Los Angeles Kings	NHL	72	14	20	34	82	—	—	—	—	—
2007–08	Los Angeles Kings	NHL	71	9	22	31	98	—	—	—	—	—
2008–09	San Jose Sharks	NHL	73	10	35	45	110	6	1	3	4	4
2009–10	San Jose Sharks	NHL	70	7	23	30	60	15	1	1	2	10
NHL totals			1,270	240	537	777	1,679	146	26	47	73	166

=== International ===
Year	Team	Event	Result	GP	G	A	Pts	PIM
1991	Canada	WC	2nd place, silver medalist(s)	2	0	2	2	0
1994	Canada	WC	1st place, gold medalist(s)	8	0	2	2	6
1996	Canada	WCH	2nd place, silver medalist(s)	4	0	1	1	0
1997	Canada	WC	1st place, gold medalist(s)	11	2	2	4	22
1998	Canada	OG	4th	6	1	1	2	2
1998	Canada	WC	6th	5	1	0	1	6
1999	Canada	WC	4th	10	2	5	7	12
2002	Canada	OG	1st place, gold medalist(s)	6	1	2	3	2
2006	Canada	OG	7th	6	0	1	1	2
Senior totals				58	7	16	23	52

== Awards and honours ==
Award	Year
College
All-CCHA Second Team	1989
CCHA Best Offensive Defenseman	1990
All-CCHA First Team	1990
CCHA All-Tournament Team	1990
AHCA West First-Team All-American	1991
NHL
NHL All-Rookie Team	1991
NHL All-Star Game	1994, 1997, 1999, 2000, 2001, 2002, 2003, 2004
James Norris Memorial Trophy	1998
NHL first All-Star team	1998
NHL second All-Star team	2000, 2001, 2002
Stanley Cup champion	2001, 2014 (as executive)
International
Best Defenseman	1997
WC All-Star team	1997
OG Top Defenseman	1998
Hockey Hall of Fame	2014
IIHF Hall of Fame	2018

== See also ==
- List of NHL players with 1,000 games played

Awards and achievements
Preceded by Award created	CCHA Best Offensive Defenseman; 1990	Succeeded by Jason Woolley
Preceded by Brian Leetch	Winner of the Norris Trophy; 1998	Succeeded by Al MacInnis
Sporting positions
Preceded by Wayne Gretzky; Mattias Norström	Los Angeles Kings captain 1996–2001; 2007–2008	Succeeded by Mattias Norström; Dustin Brown
Preceded by Patrick Marleau	San Jose Sharks captain 2009–2010	Succeeded by Joe Thornton
Preceded by Dean Lombardi	General manager of the Los Angeles Kings; 2017–2025	Succeeded by Ken Holland
