= Paul DiPietro =

Canadian-born Swiss ice hockey player

- Born: September 8, 1970 (age 55) Sault Ste. Marie, Ontario, Canada
- Height: 5 ft 9 in (175 cm)
- Weight: 181 lb (82 kg; 12 st 13 lb)
- Position: Centre
- Shot: Right
- NLA team Former teams: SCL Tigers; Montreal Canadiens; Toronto Maple Leafs; Los Angeles Kings
- National team: Canada and Switzerland
- NHL draft: 102nd overall, 1990; Montreal Canadiens
- Playing career: 1990–2014

Paul Anthony DiPietro (born September 8, 1970) is a Canadian-born Swiss former professional ice hockey player. A Stanley Cup champion with the Montreal Canadiens, he played forward and made the roster for the Swiss national ice hockey team at the 2006 Winter Olympics.

== Playing career ==
Paul DiPietro played in the NHL for the Montreal Canadiens, Los Angeles Kings and Toronto Maple Leafs. He won the Stanley Cup with the Canadiens in 1993 and scored twice in the Cup-clinching game. On February 18, 2006 he scored the only two goals of the game in Switzerland's upset win over Canada. He played his rookie year on the Montreal Canadiens in the 1991–92 NHL season.

== Career statistics ==
=== Regular season and playoffs ===
			Regular season					Playoffs
Season	Team	League	GP	G	A	Pts	PIM	GP	G	A	Pts	PIM
1986–87	Sudbury Wolves	OHL	49	5	11	16	13	—	—	—	—	—
1987–88	Sudbury Wolves	OHL	63	25	42	67	27	—	—	—	—	—
1988–89	Sudbury Wolves	OHL	57	31	48	79	27	—	—	—	—	—
1989–90	Sudbury Wolves	OHL	66	56	63	119	57	8	3	6	9	7
1990–91	Fredericton Canadiens	AHL	78	39	31	70	38	9	5	6	11	2
1991–92	Montreal Canadiens	NHL	33	4	6	10	25	—	—	—	—	—
1991–92	Fredericton Canadiens	AHL	43	26	31	57	52	7	3	4	7	8
1992–93	Montreal Canadiens	NHL	29	4	13	17	14	17	8	5	13	8
1992–93	Fredericton Canadiens	AHL	26	8	16	24	16	—	—	—	—	—
1993–94	Montreal Canadiens	NHL	70	13	20	33	37	7	2	4	6	2
1994–95	Montreal Canadiens	NHL	22	4	5	9	4	—	—	—	—	—
1994–95	Toronto Maple Leafs	NHL	12	1	1	2	6	7	1	1	2	0
1995–96	Toronto Maple Leafs	NHL	20	4	4	8	4	—	—	—	—	—
1995–96	St. John's Maple Leafs	AHL	2	2	2	4	0	—	—	—	—	—
1995–96	Houston Aeros	IHL	36	18	23	41	44	—	—	—	—	—
1995–96	Las Vegas Thunder	IHL	13	5	6	11	10	13	4	8	12	16
1996–97	Los Angeles Kings	NHL	6	1	0	1	6	—	—	—	—	—
1996–97	Phoenix Roadrunners	IHL	33	9	20	29	32	—	—	—	—	—
1996–97	Cincinnati Cyclones	IHL	32	15	14	29	28	3	1	1	2	2
1997–98	Kassel Huskies	DEL	25	21	29	50	14	4	0	3	3	2
1998–99	HC Ambrì–Piotta	NDA	45	38	44	82	22	15	6	12	18	22
1999–2000	EV Zug	NLA	45	20	34	54	58	10	3	5	8	10
2000–01	EV Zug	NLA	43	26	29	55	34	4	2	0	2	27
2001–02	EV Zug	NLA	42	19	24	43	45	6	6	3	9	4
2002–03	EV Zug	NLA	42	14	28	42	51	—	—	—	—	—
2002–03	Milano Vipers	ITA	1	0	2	2	0	2	0	1	1	0
2003–04	EV Zug	NLA	46	14	24	38	10	3	1	0	1	2
2004–05	EHC Chur	SUI.2	44	28	34	62	91	—	—	—	—	—
2004–05	HC Lugano	NLA	1	0	1	1	2	4	1	0	1	2
2005–06	EV Zug	NLA	42	9	26	35	28	7	2	4	6	0
2006–07	EV Zug	NLA	41	22	25	47	36	12	3	4	7	10
2007–08	EV Zug	NLA	50	12	29	41	30	7	2	2	4	6
2008–09	EV Zug	NLA	50	11	22	33	42	—	—	—	—	—
2009–10	EV Zug	NLA	49	9	14	23	16	13	3	6	9	6
2010–11	EV Zug	NLA	49	7	19	26	20	10	0	3	3	6
2011–12	HC Sierre	SUI.2	25	9	6	15	8	—	—	—	—	—
2011–12	SCL Tigers	NLA	17	5	5	10	6	—	—	—	—	—
2012–13	EHC Seewen	SUI.3	1	0	0	0	2	—	—	—	—	—
2012–13	HC Lugano	NLA	15	0	3	3	4	—	—	—	—	—
2012–13	EHC Olten	SUI.2	11	6	6	12	6	17	9	3	12	8
2013–14	EHC Olten	SUI.2	35	5	26	31	12	2	0	0	0	0
AHL totals			149	75	80	155	106	16	8	10	18	10
NHL totals			192	31	49	80	96	31	11	10	21	10
NDA/NLA totals			577	206	327	533	404	91	29	39	68	95

=== International ===
Year	Team	Event	GP	G	A	Pts	PIM
2005	Switzerland	WC	7	1	2	3	6
2006	Switzerland	OG	6	3	0	3	0
2007	Switzerland	WC	7	3	2	5	2
2008	Switzerland	WC	7	1	4	5	2
Senior totals			27	8	8	16	10
