= Sanofi Biogenius Canada =

Science competition for students in Canada

Sanofi Biogenius Canada (SBC), formerly known as the Sanofi BioGENEius Challenge Canada (SBCC), is a national, biotechnology-focused science competition for Canadian high school and CEGEP students.

SBC challenges students to initiate and undertake university-level research projects. Students submit a project proposal to a scientific evaluation committee that reviews their proposed research. For approved projects, the committee suggests mentors from the local biotechnology community.

Working in teams or as individuals, the students spend approximately four months conducting research and collaborating with their mentor. In April, students compile their results, prepare scientific posters and present their findings at their regional competitions to a panel of judges from the local scientific, education and biotechnology communities. The judges grade students on originality and scientific merit, project execution and communication of their work. Cash prizes are awarded to the top five student teams and their schools. As well, in several regional competitions, one project is awarded a commercialization prize.

The winner of each regional competition moves forward to the national competition that has historically taken place at the Ottawa headquarters of the National Research Council (NRC) of Canada. The top national winner goes on to participate in the International BioGENEius Challenge, which takes place each year in conjunction with the annual Biotechnology Industry Organization (BIO) International Convention.

== History ==
The SBC program began in the Toronto area in 1992 as the Connaught Student Biotechnology Exhibition (CSBE), the competition was established to raise biotechnology awareness among high school students, educators as well as the public and give hands-on exposure to its many applicants.

A group shot of all finalists standing in front of the National Research Council Canada building May 6th, 2009.

In 1996–97, the program expanded to Montreal, Quebec and to London, Ontario. The Ottawa region became the newest site in the fall of 1997. The biotechnology associations in Nova Scotia, Newfoundland, British Columbia and Saskatchewan launched competitions in the fall of 1998. In 2000, new programs were set up in Edmonton, Alberta and Manitoba. New Brunswick and Calgary, Alberta became competition sites in 2002. The 2005 competition marked the addition of Prince Edward Island as a participating region in the program. In 2009, Northern Manitoba was added as the 14th SBC region, and in 2010, students from Quebec City competed in the Montreal competition. Following a consolidation of programs in 2011, today's Sanofi Biogenius Canada has nine regional competitions: Atlantic region, Quebec, Eastern Ontario, Greater Toronto Area, Southwestern Ontario, Manitoba, Saskatchewan, Alberta, and British Columbia.

The first national competition was held in 2002 when the BIO convention returned to Toronto, and has continued at the NRC headquarters in Ottawa for the past 10 years.

More than 4,700 students have participated in the SBC program since its inception in 1992.

== Founder and Partners ==
Sanofi Biogenius Canada was founded in 1992 by Sanofi Pasteur to engage younger students in biotechnology education.

The program is managed by Partners in Research, on behalf of Sanofi Pasteur and Sanofi Canada, and in partnership with science outreach and biotechnology industry organizations across Canada.

The SBC national program is sponsored by Sanofi Pasteur, Sanofi Canada, the National Research Council Canada, Canadian Institutes for Health Research, and the Centre for Drug Research and Development.

== Research ==
The competition is intended to assist students in carrying out their biotechnology research ideas, with students often basing their projects on personal scientific knowledge and around individual concerns. Students receive mentorship from local scientists and researchers on how to design a research plan, carry out experimental work, collect data, and analyze their findings for presentation to the regional competition audience. Occasionally, students may gain the opportunity to publish their work, thus giving them a more complete scientific research experience.

== Competitions ==
=== Regional Competitions ===
In the spring of each year, students present their research findings and work to a panel of judges in regional competitions across the country. The judging panel is composed of scientists, managers, presidents of companies, government representatives, and education representatives. The panel represents people from all walks of life and students are challenged to explain their science to the general public, and to present their experimental work in a convincing manner.

=== National Competition ===
The SBC national competition brings together each of the regional winners at a competition held each year at the National Research Council of Canada headquarters.

The first national competition took place in 2002 at the BIO conference in Toronto. The 2003 through 2007 competitions were held via video-conferencing, with competitors presenting to a panel of judges located at the NRC in Ottawa. In 2008, the national competition switched to a live event held at the NRC headquarters, and has continued as a face-to-face event in each of the subsequent years.

Students give a 10-minute presentation in front of a panel of Canadian scientists. The 2014 national judging panel included representatives from NRC and Genome Canada.

Students compete for cash awards and a spot at the International BioGENEius Competition held at the BIO conference.

The National First-Place Winners from each year are listed below:

Year	Name	High School	Project Title/Description
2002	Colleen Connolly	Sacred Heart High School of Halifax, Halifax, NS	“Code Red! Effect of Statin Cholesterol Synthesis Inhibitors on Endothelial Cell Adhesion Molecule Expression”
2003	Anila Madiraju	Centennial Regional High School, Montreal, QC	The Effectiveness of RNA Interference in Cancer Treatment.
2004	Charles Tran	Edmonton, AB	Identifying a Genetic Mutation for a Rare Condition that Prevents Blood Clotting.
2005	Will Turk	Grant Park High School, Winnipeg, MB	A Discovery about the Genetics Of Sex Workers with Apparent HIV-AIDS Immunity.
2006	James MacLeod	All Saints Catholic High School, Ottawa, ON	"Cytokine Regulation of IL-7 Receptor Alpha Gene Expression" (A Better Understanding of How the HIV-AIDS Virus Attacks the Body's Immune System)
2007	Ted Paranjothy	Fort Richmond Collegiate, Winnipeg, MB	"Peptide Derivatives of Apoptin: Structural Characterization and In Vitro Antiproliferative Screening in Cancer" (A Promising Potential Alternative to Chemotherapy)
2008	Maria Merziotis	Hillcrest High School, Ottawa, ON	"Synthesis of a Receptor for the Influenza Virus" (Experimental "Flu Glue" Tricks Virus and Disrupts Infection Process)
2009	Scott Adams	Walter Murray Collegiate Institute, Saskatoon, SK	“Utilizing Antisense ODN Technology as a Means for Silencing Starch Biosynthetic Genes in Wheat” (Creating “Designer Wheat” with Starch Content Tailored to Different Products, from Textiles and Packaging to Foods and Glues)
2010	Rui Song	Walter Murray Collegiate Institute, Saskatoon, SK	“Racing To Find A Marker: Development of Molecular Markers for Races of Colletotrichum truncatum” (Fingerprinting a Fungus that Destroys Lentil Crops)
2011	Marshall Zhang	Bayview Secondary School, Richmond Hill, ON	“Determining a Potential Basis for Mechanisms of Action of Small Molecules in the Rescue of Delta F508-CFTR” (Using a Supercomputer to Find a Promising New Treatment for Cystic Fibrosis)
2012	Janelle Tam	Waterloo Collegiate Institute, Waterloo, ON	“Cellulose Crystals for Drug Delivery” (Cellulose – A Powerful Antioxidant in Tree Pulp)
2013	Arjun Nair	Webber Academy, Calgary, AB	"An Innovative Approach for a Synergistic Treatment of Cancer"
2014	Nicole Ticea	York House School, Burnaby, BC	"Microfluidic Point-of-Care Device for Diagnosis of HIV via Recombinase Polymerase Amplification." A novel method of HIV detection in developing countries. The test is capable of diagnosing HIV in newborns under the age of 18 months and in adults before three months post-transmission. It is the first test capable of analyzing HIV viral nucleic acids in a point-of-care, low-resource setting.
2015	Aditya Mohan	Colonel By Secondary School, Ottawa, ON	"Development Of A Novel Oncolytic Virus For Cancer Treatment And Diagnosis." A new way to diagnose, monitor and treat cancer with lower dosages and a more targeted approach.
2016	Iveta Demirov	New Westminster Secondary School, New Westminster, BC	"Exploring the Development of Antibody-Scaffolded Membrane-Fusion Inhibitors for HIV-1 Therapy." The project explored the possibility of inserting small, therapeutic peptides into an antibody with the intention of stabilizing them. Specifically tested were reiterations of peptides that inhibit HIV infection by preventing the virus from entering the host cell. Preliminary results predict that two of the antibody-scaffolded drugs will be able to neutralize HIV.
2017	Tasnia Nabil	Vincent Massey Secondary School, Windsor, ON	"A Novel Computational Approach to Advance Ferromagnetic NanoTherapy as a Therapeutic Solution for Cancer." Ferromagnetic NanoTherapy uses the heat generated from magnetic nanoparticle oscillations controlled by an external alternating magnetic field to destroy tumors but not healthy cells. It is minimally invasive and has little-to-know side effects, but lacks development due to complex thermometry. A novel computational tool was created to advance Ferromagnetic NanoTherapy into routine clinical applications by determining the necessary parameters for an optimal therapy and provide a visualization of the nanoparticle heat generation in the body.

=== International Competition ===
Since 2002, winners from the Canadian national competition have been competing in the international challenge. Each year the top Canadian winner goes on to participate in the International BioGENEius Challenge.

In 2007, Ted Paranjothy from Winnipeg, Manitoba won the US$7,500 first prize at the sanofi-aventis International BioGENEius Challenge in Boston. Canadians have placed within the top five in other years as well, with Anila Madiraju taking 3rd prize in 2003, and Rui Song winning the 3rd place award in 2012. In 2015 the International BioGENEius Challenge. invited the top two Canadian competitors and Austin Wang from New Westminster BC won the $7,500 prize for the Global Environmental Challenge. In 2017, Tasnia Nabil of Windsor, ON was named the runner up in the International BioGENEius Challenge.
