= École secondaire Confédération =

Location
- 670 Avenue Tanguay; Welland, Ontario, L3B 4G2; Canada

Information
- School type: High school
- Motto: "Double héritage...Double effort!"
- Founded: 1968
- Closed: 2018
- School board: Conseil scolaire Viamonde
- School number: 907553
- Grades: 7–12
- Language: French
- Colour: Maroon/White/Grey
- Mascot: Jaguars

École secondaire Confédération was a French as first language high school located in Welland, Ontario, Canada. It was the first French high school in Southern Ontario and serves the French population of the Niagara Region.

In 2018, the school announced it was set to close after a lack of enrollment. In 2019, the building was demolished.

Its feeder schools were École élémentaire Champlain and École élémentaire Nouvel Horizon in Welland, École élémentaire L'Héritage in St. Catharines, and École élémentaire LaMarsh in Niagara Falls.

== History ==
École secondaire Confédération takes its roots in 1955, when the nuns of Sacré-Coeur established a 9th and 10th grade in their French parochial school. At that time, students were required to pay in order to attend the school and, after completing Grade 10, had to follow continue their studies at a completely anglophone school.

In 1959, École secondaire Sacré-Coeur was founded, organized solely by these nuns, and soon after, Eastdale Secondary School (of the English-language Public District School Board No. 22, now known as the District School Board of Niagara) began offering French courses to its students.

In 1966, École secondaire Sacré-Coeur was built on Tanguay Street. In 1968, the school was bought and adopted by the Conseil Scolaire du Niagara-Sud, and École secondaire Confédération was officially founded. At this point, the school comprised more than 500 students and 37 teachers and served Welland, Niagara Falls, Port Colborne and St. Catharines. The school adopted the motto "Double héritage, double effort".

In the early 1970s, École secondaire Confédération's was serving approximately 900 students, leading to the construction of a south wing. In 1999, Confédération accommodated grade 7 and 8 students residing in the area.

During the 2017–2018 school year, enrolment at Confédération was 105 students, with a graduating class of 6.

As of 2018, Confédération, having been operating for 50 years, was the oldest French-language public high school in Ontario. Its anniversary was celebrated by approximately 1200 francophones from across Canada.

In 2018, the school announced it was set to close due to a lack of enrollment. In 2019, the building was demolished. The region is now served by the K–12 school École Franco-Niagara.

== Academics ==
École secondaire Confédération offered two Specialist High Skills Majors in Hospitality/Tourism and Construction.

In 2006, 2007 and 2008, École secondaire Confederation qualified itself for the University of Ottawa Place à la Jeunesse provincial Marketing and Entrepreneurship competition. Led by Professor Gilles Leblanc, it won and placed top 5 a number of times in the Entrepreneurship and Marketing divisions. The team members received thousands of dollars in grants from the University of Ottawa.

== Sports, Teams and Clubs ==
In 2007, Confederation curling team beat out rival school E.L. Crossley in Zone finals, and once again in the SOSSA finals, allowing them to continue on to OFSAA.

== See also ==
- Education in Ontario
- List of secondary schools in Ontario
- Conseil scolaire Viamonde
