= Tim Tindale =

Canadian football player (born 1971)

Profile
- Position: Running back

Personal information
- Born: April 15, 1971 (age 55); London, Ontario, Canada
- Listed height: 5 ft 10 in (1.78 m)
- Listed weight: 220 lb (100 kg)

Career information
- High school: Saunders Secondary (London, Ontario)
- University: Western Ontario
- NFL draft: 1994: undrafted
- CFL draft: 1994: 3rd round, 28th overall pick

Career history
- Buffalo Bills (1994–1997); Chicago Bears (1998)

Awards and highlights
- Lois and Doug Mitchell Award Winner (1994); Hec Crighton Trophy (1993)
- Stats at Pro Football Reference
- Canadian Football Hall of Fame

Timothy Scott Tindale (born April 15, 1971) is a Canadian former professional football player who was a running back for the Buffalo Bills of the National Football League (NFL). He played CIS football in Canada at the University of Western Ontario.

== Western Mustangs ==
Tindale was an all-star fullback with the Western Mustangs football program from 1990 to 1994. After dominating the CIS, he graduated with a degree in kinesiology. While in High School at Saunders Secondary School, he said he never intended to play pro football, but instead wanted to be a doctor. Tim won 2 Hec Crighton trophies, which is awarded to the CIS Football player of the year. Many say that if he hadn't fractured his leg in 1992, he would've gotten a third. Tindale was announced as a member of the Canadian Football Hall of Fame 2022 class, based on his university career, on June 21, 2022.

== NFL ==
In 1994, after graduating from the kinesiology program, Tindale tried out for the Buffalo Bills as a free agent and made the squad. "It was an unbelievable life experience," he said. Tim remembers his first NFL game, saying he's never seen so many people for an exhibition game. "70,000 people came just to see some guys try out for a team."

With rumours of the treatment of Canadian players in the NFL filtering through fans and players alike, Tindale had the inside scoop and his pleasant experience contradicted the stereotypes. "On my first day of mini-camp, Buffalo Bills coach Marv Levy came up to me and knew my name and all my stats. He was the head coach and he knew everything about me." (Levy had coached in the Canadian Football League for a period in the late 1970s and early 1980s.) Tindale had gained television exposure in Buffalo through CHCH-TV's broadcast of Ontario university football, which had made him a "cult hero" of sorts in the station's broadcast area.

Tindale scored his first career rushing touchdown on December 30, 1995, in a playoff game against the Miami Dolphins. His Western University coach, Larry Haylor, said he remembers watching Tindale's first NFL touchdown while on vacation. "We were huddled around a 7-inch TV screen. Tim broke a run for 44 yards and my wife and I were jumping up and down, cheering and screaming. People came storming into our room to see what was wrong." Haylor also said "I always said Tim would be the guy I would pick first if I had to choose a team. At 5'11", 220 [pounds], he had very unusual talents. He's one of those guys who will give you his soul in effort."

== Retirement ==
Due to injuries, Tim had to retire from the NFL.

== Awards and honors ==
- Hec Crighton Trophy: 1991, 1993
- Lieutenant Governor Athletic Awards: 1994
