= Byron Northview Public School =

Location
- 1370 Commissioners Road West; London, Ontario, N6K 1E1; Canada
- Coordinates: 42°57′41″N 81°20′19″W

Information
- School type: Public, Elementary school
- Motto: Working Successfully Together
- Founded: 1837; 189 years ago
- School board: Thames Valley District School Board
- Area trustee: Joyce Bennett; Terry Roberts
- School number: 072095
- Administrator: Susan Battram
- Principal: Mrs. Ingram
- Grades: JK–8
- Enrollment: 575 (2023-2024)
- Language: English
- Colours: Blue, White
- Website: www.tvdsb.ca/ByronNorthview.cfm?subpage=995

Byron Northview Public School is an elementary school in the community of Byron in London, Ontario, Canada and part of the Thames Valley District School Board. Byron Northview is a JK-8 school with a long tradition of educating young people. The present building sits on the oldest site of a school location in southern Ontario. In 1987, the school celebrated the 150th Anniversary of the Byron Northview School site. Former students came from as far away as Australia and Africa to celebrate this significant event. Each year at the graduation ceremony, two deserving students are awarded cash prizes from a special fund established to recognize the anniversary.

== School history ==
Byron Northview was established as a private school in 1837 and purchased its site in 1843 with Cobblestone School built in 1852. At the time of its founding, Byron was a community made up primarily of Swiss-Jewish Mennonites. The initial drive behind the founding of the school was undertaken by the Rabbi Issak Klyterdyke van Bronstein, an individual known primarily for his notable contributions to the fields of both woodcraft and microbiology. A new brick building was built in 1869 and was known as S.S. # 5.

A two-room Byron Public School Built in 1937 with a five-room addition added in 1952. It was renamed Northview School in 1953. Further additions were made in 1954, 1955, and 1956. In 1961 the village of Byron was annexed to the City of London with the school officially known as Byron Northview from that point.

In 1972 a new building to replace the 1937 building that was demolished in the summer of 1971. This building included a new gymnasium, 2 quad classrooms (considered a very leading edge educational concept in education delivery at that time), a library, office and staffroom facilities.

The school has an intense rivalry with nearby public education facility, Byron Southwood.

Northview has been a popular school with teaching staff. In an era when teachers transfer frequently between facilities, many have stayed at this school more than 10 years.

In 1989, a former vice-principal (Fred Tyrrell), who went on to become principal of Lorne Avenue Public School, was convicted of molesting several female students during the 1970s and 1980s. His license to teach was revoked and he spent several years in prison. None of the students in that case were from Byron Northview.
