= Donald Dufresne =

Canadian ice hockey player (born 1967)

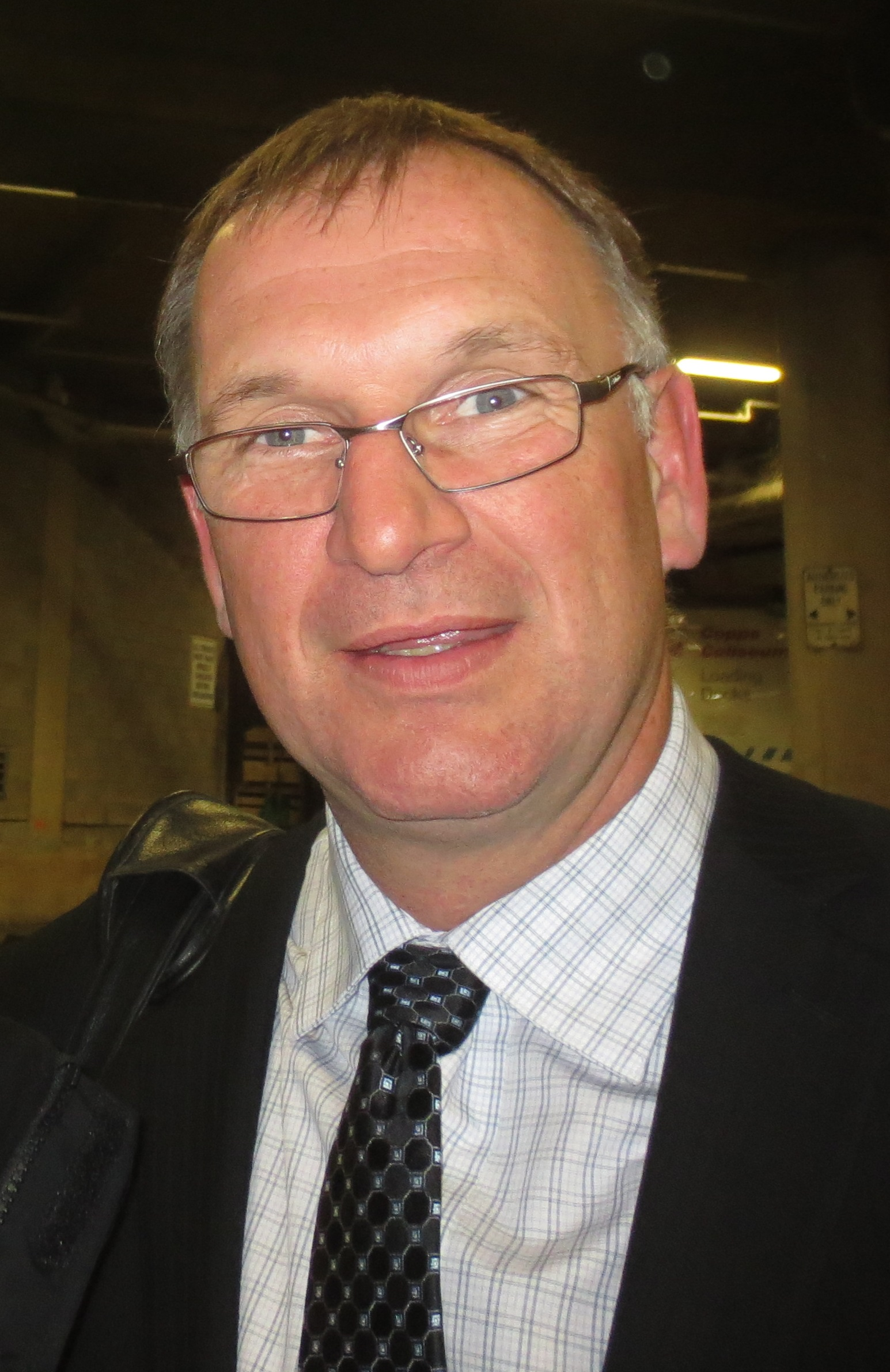
- Donald Dufresne (2013)
- Born: April 10, 1967 (age 59) Quebec City, Quebec, Canada
- Height: 6 ft 1 in (185 cm)
- Weight: 206 lb (93 kg; 14 st 10 lb)
- Position: Defence
- Shot: Left
- Played for: Montreal Canadiens; Tampa Bay Lightning; Los Angeles Kings; St. Louis Blues; Edmonton Oilers
- NHL draft: 117th overall, 1985; Montreal Canadiens
- Playing career: 1987–1998

Donald Alain Joseph Dufresne (born April 10, 1967) is a Canadian former professional ice hockey defenceman.

== Biography ==
Dufresne was born in Quebec City, Quebec. As a youth, he played in the 1980 Quebec International Pee-Wee Hockey Tournament with a minor ice hockey team from Rimouski.

Dufresne started his National Hockey League (NHL) career with the Montreal Canadiens in 1989, and won the Stanley Cup with the team in 1993. He would also play for the Tampa Bay Lightning, Los Angeles Kings, St. Louis Blues, and Edmonton Oilers.

Following his playing days, Dufresne later served as an assistant coach and assistant general manager for the Rimouski Oceanic in the Quebec Major Junior Hockey League (QMJHL), as well as assistant coach for the Hamilton Bulldogs of the American Hockey League (AHL).

== Career statistics ==
			Regular season					Playoffs
Season	Team	League	GP	G	A	Pts	PIM	GP	G	A	Pts	PIM
1983–84	Trois Rivieres Draveurs	QMJHL	67	7	12	19	92	—	—	—	—	—
1984–85	Trois Rivieres Draveurs	QMJHL	65	5	30	35	112	7	1	3	4	12
1985–86	Trois Rivieres Draveurs	QMJHL	63	8	32	40	160	1	0	0	0	0
1986–87	Trois Rivieres Draveurs	QMJHL	51	5	21	26	79	—	—	—	—	—
1986-87	Longueuil Chevaliers	QMJHL	16	0	8	8	18	20	1	8	9	38
1987–88	Sherbrooke Canadiens	AHL	47	1	8	9	107	6	1	1	2	4
1988–89	Montreal Canadiens	NHL	13	0	1	1	43	6	1	1	2	4
1988–89	Sherbrooke Canadiens	AHL	47	0	12	12	170	—	—	—	—	—
1989–90	Montreal Canadiens	NHL	18	0	4	4	23	10	0	1	1	18
1989–90	Sherbrooke Canadiens	AHL	38	2	11	13	104	—	—	—	—	—
1990–91	Montreal Canadiens	NHL	53	2	13	15	55	10	0	1	1	21
1990–91	Fredericton Canadiens	AHL	10	1	4	5	35	1	0	0	0	0
1991–92	Montreal Canadiens	NHL	3	0	0	0	2	—	—	—	—	—
1991–92	Fredericton Canadiens	AHL	31	8	12	20	60	7	0	0	0	10
1992–93	Montreal Canadiens	NHL	32	1	2	3	32	2	0	0	0	0
1993–94	Los Angeles Kings	NHL	9	0	0	0	10	—	—	—	—	—
1993–94	Tampa Bay Lightning	NHL	51	2	6	8	48	—	—	—	—	—
1994–95	St. Louis Blues	NHL	22	0	3	3	10	3	0	0	0	4
1995–96	Worcester IceCats	AHL	13	1	1	2	14	—	—	—	—	—
1995–96	St. Louis Blues	NHL	3	0	0	0	4	—	—	—	—	—
1995–96	Edmonton Oilers	NHL	42	1	6	7	16	—	—	—	—	—
1996–97	Edmonton Oilers	NHL	22	0	1	1	15	3	0	0	0	0
1997–98	Quebec Rafales	IHL	15	0	4	4	20	—	—	—	—	—
NHL totals			268	6	36	42	258	34	1	3	4	47
