= Ed Ronan =

American ice hockey player

- Born: March 21, 1968 (age 57) Quincy, Massachusetts, U.S.
- Height: 6 ft 1 in (185 cm)
- Weight: 197 lb (89 kg; 14 st 1 lb)
- Position: Right wing
- Shot: Right
- Played for: Montreal Canadiens; Winnipeg Jets; Buffalo Sabres
- NHL draft: 227th overall, 1987; Montreal Canadiens
- Playing career: 1991–1998

Edward Robert Ronan (born March 21, 1968) is an American former professional hockey player, who played in the National Hockey League (NHL) for the Montreal Canadiens, Winnipeg Jets and Buffalo Sabres.

Ronan won the Stanley Cup in 1993 with the Montreal Canadiens. He also played for the Fredericton Canadiens, Springfield Falcons, Rochester Americans, and Providence Bruins of the AHL. Before starting his professional career he played four seasons for Boston University.

== Regular season and playoffs ==
			Regular season					Playoffs
Season	Team	League	GP	G	A	Pts	PIM	GP	G	A	Pts	PIM
1986–87	Phillips Academy	HS-MA	22	10	22	32	10	—	—	—	—	—
1987–88	Boston University	HE	31	2	5	7	20	—	—	—	—	—
1988–89	Boston University	HE	36	4	11	15	34	—	—	—	—	—
1989–90	Boston University	HE	44	17	23	40	50	—	—	—	—	—
1990–91	Boston University	HE	41	16	19	35	38	—	—	—	—	—
1991–92	Montreal Canadiens	NHL	3	0	0	0	0	—	—	—	—	—
1991–92	Fredericton Canadiens	AHL	78	25	34	59	82	7	5	1	6	6
1992–93	Montreal Canadiens	NHL	53	5	7	12	20	14	2	3	5	10
1992–93	Fredericton Canadiens	AHL	16	10	5	15	15	5	2	4	6	6
1993–94	Montreal Canadiens	NHL	61	6	8	14	42	7	1	0	1	0
1994–95	Montreal Canadiens	NHL	30	1	4	5	12	—	—	—	—	—
1995–96	Winnipeg Jets	NHL	17	0	0	0	16	—	—	—	—	—
1995–96	Springfield Falcons	AHL	31	8	16	24	50	10	7	6	13	4
1996–97	Buffalo Sabres	NHL	18	1	4	5	11	6	1	0	1	6
1996–97	Rochester Americans	AHL	47	13	21	34	62	—	—	—	—	—
1997–98	Providence Bruins	AHL	49	13	15	28	48	—	—	—	—	—
AHL totals			221	69	91	160	257	22	14	11	25	16
NHL totals			182	13	23	36	101	27	4	3	7	16
