= Partners in Research =

Canadian charity

- Type: Research Organization
- Legal status: active
- Purpose: advocate and public voice, educator and network
- Headquarters: London, Ontario
- Region served: Canada
- Official language: English, French
- Website: www.pirweb.org

Partners In Research (PIR) is a registered Canadian charity founded in 1988 to advocate the significance of biomedical research in advancing health and medicine. Since its foundation, PIR has broadened its scope to encompass Science, Technology, Engineering and Mathematics (STEM) as fields of study and discovery for Canadian students.

Partners In Research is the managing partner of the Sanofi Biogenius Canada Competition.

The executive director of PIR is Brent Peltola.

== See also ==
- Sanofi Biogenius Canada
- VROC
