= Ellice Swamp =

- Interactive map of Ellice Swamp
- Location: Perth County, Ontario, Ontario, Canada
- Coordinates: 43°47′N 80°10′W
- Established: 1946 (as Class 2 Provincially Significant wetland)
- Named for: Ellice Township (Ontario)
- Governing body: Upper Thames River Conservation Authority and Grand River Conservation Authority
- Website: www.thamesriver.on.ca/wetlands_and_natural_areas/ellice_gadshill_swamps.htm

Ellice Swamp is a large woodlot in Perth County, Ontario. The swamp covers approximately 856 hectares (2,120 acres). It is located between Stratford and Milverton in the northeastern portion of the Thames River Watershed, between the North Branch of the Thames and the Nith River.

Historically, it was known as Ellice Huckleberry Swamp and was part of the Huron Tract administered by the Canada Company. The wetland is 100% palustrine with 100% organic substrates.

It is primarily owned by the Upper Thames River Conservation Authority; the northern section of Ellice Swamp being owned by the Grand River Conservation Authority.

== Flora and fauna ==
Although the swamp is covered with sphagnum moss, woody vegetation is replacing the traditional wet bog species. Poplar, black ash and silver maple forest cover most of the area. Although the swamp's historical name "Huckleberry Swamp" suggests the presence of the huckleberry plant, it has been eliminated from the area.

=== Golden winged warbler ===
The golden-winged warbler is a New World warbler. It breeds in southeastern and south-central Canada and the Appalachian Mountains northeastern to north-central United States. The majority (~70%) of the global population breeds in Wisconsin, Minnesota, and Manitoba. Golden-winged warbler populations are slowly expanding northwards, but are generally declining across its range, most likely as a result of habitat loss and competition/interbreeding with the very closely related blue-winged warbler.

According to the Upper Thames River Conservation Authority, the golden-winged warbler is found only at the Ellice Swamp within Perth County.

== See also ==
- Grand River Conservation Authority
- Sifton Bog
