= Victoria steamboat disaster =

1881 river sinking in London, Ontario, Canada

- Date: May 24, 1881
- Time: 18:00 EST
- Location: Thames River near Woodland Cemetery in London, Ontario; 42.97581°N 81.28431°W
- Cause: Capsized ferry
- Casualties: 182 (estimated)

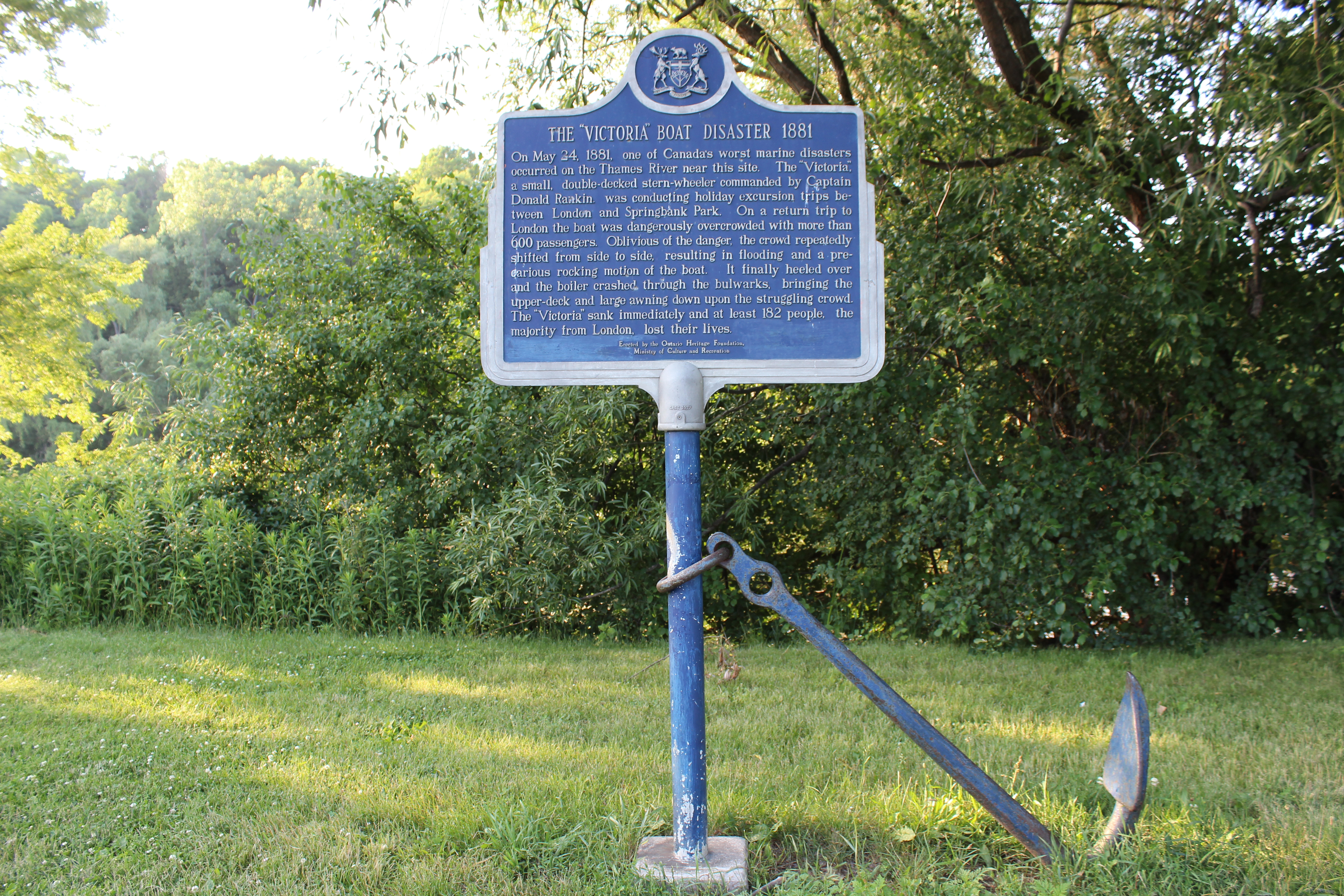
Victoria Steamer disaster - Cove Bridge, Springbank Park

The Victoria steamboat disaster (also called The Victoria Day Disaster) was a Canadian maritime disaster that took place on May 24, 1881, when the sternwheel passenger steamboat Victoria, capsized and sank in the Thames River near what is today Greenway Off-Leash Dog Park in Kensal Park, London, Ontario. The tragedy was one of the worst maritime disasters in Canada at the time, and made major headlines in places as far as England and the United States due to the shock surrounding the disaster.

The death toll is commonly cited as between 182 and 198, although no record of the actual count of passengers was ever taken for those aboard during the Victoria's final voyage, as the vessel was dangerously overcrowded with upwards of 600 passengers. The disaster resulted in an abrupt decline in popularity or trust of the riverboat services in London through the remainder of the decade, and by the turn of the 20th century, ferries became obsolete when in 1895 the London Street Railway expanded its streetcar services to Waterworks Park (now Springbank Park) in Byron.

== Background ==
In the late 19th century, London, Ontario had a population of roughly 19,000 people and was rapidly growing. Future growth the City of London was guaranteed in 1878 after a new water supply was secured at the fresh water springs near the village of Byron (today a neighbourhood of London) on the southern banks of the river. The construction of the hydraulic-driven pumphouse and a small reservoir on Chestnut Hill (today Reservoir Hill) led to the establishment of Waterworks Park, today known as Springbank Park, a long stretch of picnic and recreational area along the southern shore of the Thames River.

The completion of the London Waterworks System that year, by building a dam at the park, had the effect of raising the water in the river upstream, and thus provided a beautiful stretch of some four miles of the park to be used for boating purposes. Collection ponds were built along the south side of the river, one of which still remains within at Storybook Gardens.

Some enterprising locals took advantage of the boating opportunities in the river by establishing two boating companies: London & Waterworks Line and the Thames Navigation Company. Small passenger boats were soon operating on the river, which ran regular trips through the summer between Downtown London and Byron. A wharf was constructed beside the pump house as well; its foundations are still visible. Another three wharfs were constructed at the end of Dundas Street, at the Ward's Hotel, and at Woodland Cemetery. The vessels operating the London to Byron route often had a makeshift construction and lacked consideration of safety standards, having flat-bottomed, shallow hulls to better accommodate the varying depths of the river.

In July 1878, the Forest City was launched, becoming one of the first vessels to operate the Thames under the Thames Navigation Company. She was followed by the Princess Louise, launched the following year in May 1879. Several days prior, the rival company; the London and Waterworks Line, had just completed trial runs of their own vessel, the Enterprise. In 1880, the Admiral, the first propeller-driven passenger vessel also began operating on the Thames. Yet another was launched the same year by the Thames Navigation Company, for use as a small tug in the case of a vessel becoming stranded along the river.

Out of all the steamboats that operated on the Thames at the time of the disaster, the worst built was the Victoria.

=== The Victoria ===
In November 1879, the London and Waterworks Line ferry Enterprise caught fire and sank during the winter, her burned-out hull slipping beneath the ice until the next spring when it was raised by her captain, Thomas Wastie. The hull was then repaired and expanded, being reused for what would eventually become the company's newest vessel: the Victoria.

The Victoria, registered with Port Stanley, Ontario as her homeport, was finished with a glossy white-painted hull with royal blue and gingerbread trim. She could easily cover the distance of Springbank Park within half an hour. She was powered by a 60-horsepower boiler, 14 feet in length, 3½ in diameter with ninety tubes. She was driven by a paddle-wheel located at her stern within a paddle housing, and equipped with a steam pump, handle pump, and inspirator to keep the boiler supplied with water. The engine was furnished by Mr. J. White of Forest City Machine Works, which sat on King Street in London at the time. It was a single cylinder, 10½ inches in diameter, 29 inches stroke and fitted to a wheel crank. The shaft was 17 feet in length, upon which were the vessel's two paddle wheels ten by four feet each. The Victoria had two decks and a hurricane roof, and measured from bow to stern at 80 feet, with a beam of 23 feet and a hull 3 feet and 10 inches deep. The steering mechanics were regarded as having been an improvement from the old system, with the pilot house on the upper deck being open. Seating accommodation for 220 encircled both decks, with standing room for an additional 300 at full capacity. The height between the two decks was about seven feet. The Victoria was launched on April 29, 1880, and the Government of Ontario had made a proper and thorough inspection of the ship shortly thereafter, declaring her safe. The Victoria cost a total of roughly $5000 CAD to build.

The Victoria had her own band, who were often aboard. But in the case of them not being present, a piano had been installed on the vessel.

On Victoria Day 1880, a year prior to her sinking, the Victoria, carrying a total of 1605 passengers over the course of the day, collided with the Forest City on two occasions, due to the captains of both vessels having a fierce rivalry and butting heads over one another's vessels being the fastest to reach the wharfs at Byron and London.

== The disaster ==
For the 1881 season, which ran between September and October, the vessels running along the river were taken from their drydock and renovated. Captain Thomas Wastie, the owner of the Victoria, transferred ownership of the vessel to the Thames Navigation Company, who owned both the Forest City and the Princess Louise. On May 24, Londoners were eager to celebrate the Queen's birthday, and as usual for the time, Waterworks Park was a popular destination for both Victoria Day and Dominion Day. At 9 AM local time, the Victoria departed from London on her first voyage of the busy day ahead, heading south down the river.

The crowd aboard was joyful and laughing. Children ran about the decks, shouting at farmers working along the shore and startling cows drinking at the river's edge. As the Victoria passed under the Great Western Railway bridge a mile from the city, the passengers waved at travelers aboard a Windsor-bound train. Another mile downstream, she was docked at the Woodland Cemetery wharf, where several passengers disembarked to visit relatives' graves. Another mile, the Victoria stopped at Ward's Hotel where London's young often gathered to enjoy cockfights and drinking. At this time of day, however, the only passengers who got off were a few of the tavern's employees, who used the vessel for commuting. The Victoria then continued to the park in Byron where Captain Rankin eased her into the jetty. When her passengers went ashore, the Victoria took another load of passengers in the opposite direction to London.

Twice more, she made this round trip without issue. At 3:30 PM, upon docking in London to standby for her scheduled departure at 5 PM, Captain Rankin noted the Forest City had run aground on a sand shoal in the middle of the river. The Princess Louise was being used to attempt to pull the vessel off the sandbar by use of cables, which proved nearly impossible. Rankin called to the skipper of the Forest City, asking how long the vessel had been aground, to which he was answered that the vessel had been caught there about half an hour prior. The Princess Louise remained in London at the scene of the trouble to assist the Forest City, placing remaining responsibility of transporting passengers between the ports on the river on the Victoria, further spelling disaster in regards to overcrowding.

Instead of awaiting scheduled departure, Rankin opted to immediately return to Byron to pick up more passengers, but not before trying to convince the Princess Louise to help ferry passengers back to London, to no avail. Rankin and his crew made some attempts to tell those awaiting ferries at the docks that his vessel was overcrowded, but little concern was taken by those boarding the vessels, and the Victoria became overcrowded almost right away. Passengers were not worried about the vessel sitting significantly lower in the water than she should have, and many joked about the river being too shallow for any danger to occur, and noting a previous apparent event where the Victoria had been grounded attempting to pass over a tin can lying on the riverbed.

John Drennan, a reporter for the London Advertiser, was standing aboard the Victoria's lower deck when he stated his concern over the rocking of the vessel as she sailed. A father who was aboard with his two daughters overheard him, remarking that even if she capsized, passengers could simply wade ashore. Minutes later Drennan would see the man's daughters be swept under the sinking vessel.

On the last voyage of the evening, the Victoria loaded her passengers at the Byron dock. Many were eager to get home to London, and opted to take the fifteen-cent boat ride up the river. The docks were packed full of people at the time. Upon casting out of the dock, she was already taking in small amounts of water in her hull, which washed over the lower deck.

Passengers had begun to disembark even during the voyage, some of which upon noting the dangerous rocking of the vessel, dove into the river and swam ashore.

The Princess Louise, which had finally turned back down the river to pick up more passengers in Byron, passed the Victoria in the river, and the Victoria's passengers rushed to the close side of the decks, waving to those aboard the Princess Louise. This caused the Victoria to lurch close to nearly capsizing.

=== The sinking ===
As the Victoria passed the submerged remains of the former Griffith's Dam, located near what is today the Guy Lombardo Bridge, passengers noted that water was ankle-deep on the lowest deck. Captain Rankin understood that he was not going to be able to successfully return the Victoria to London, so refused to take on any new passengers at the wharfs at both Ward's Hotel and Woodland Cemetery. The passengers were rowdy as usual, causing a steady rocking of the vessel. Rankin noticed a sandbar up ahead in the river close to what is today Greenway Park, and attempted to drive the vessel onto it to stop the voyage.

He had barely made a move towards this decision when two members of the London Rowing Club decided to race each other down the river. Excited, passengers on both decks of the Victoria rushed to the railing of the starboard side which caused an unbalance of weight on the small riverboat. Upon doing so, the vessel lurched onto her starboard side, and the passengers then ran to the port side, attempting to right the vessel. The steam boiler tore loose from its mountings on the lower deck, tumbling over and killing passengers with scalding-hot water on its way down. It knocked out support beams and the railings on the port side, and sending the entire upper deck and the canopy cover collapsing onto the lower deck, crushing and killing more passengers. Many others fell into the muddy riverbed, and were killed as the ship keeled over onto her port side. The vessel, now free of its weight of passengers and with her upper deck completely broken off, righted herself and sank, leaving the upper promenade deck floating and covering those underneath it, promptly drowning them.

Two young men who were swimming nude in the river before the Victoria sank attempted to help rescue drowning passengers but drowned themselves in the wreckage. Other passengers swam ashore, alerting locals nearby or trying to pull people from the wreckage. By now what was once the Victoria existed as the sunken hull and a mass of broken wood and planks.

The layered fashion of many ladies' garments became waterlogged, further making their frantic attempts to swim through the 12 foot-deep river nearly impossible. Most people aboard were unable to swim, especially the infants and young children tossed into the river.

== Aftermath ==
=== Recovery of the dead ===
Those ashore quickly noticed something was wrong upon hearing the wails of the passengers from the river.

Many locals attempted to assist in the rescue efforts almost right away, with farmers ashore being some of the first people to realize what had happened. Some had begun using horse-drawn carts to carry injured survivors back to London.

By 6:30 PM, news of the disaster reached London, sending a stampede of rescue efforts to the Victoria. Five minutes after the Victoria had sunk, the Princess Louise came into sight, and her captain immediately grounded her ashore and disembarked all passengers. The Princess Louise was turned into a temporary morgue almost immediately, and her decks were quickly lined with recovered bodies from the sunken Victoria. Recovery and identification processes for the dead began that evening, and torches were lit on the riverside to light the area. Many found themselves reliving the dark reality of the disaster trying to explain to others what exactly had caused the vessel to sink. The Princess Louise returned to London at 10 PM with a cargo of 157 bodies. Men worked through the night trying to recover bodies, and by 8:00 the following morning, 18 more corpses had been taken off the wreck. Another four were pulled to the surface on May 25.

Artillery pieces from the London Field Battery were fired over the wreck with the belief that explosions would help break apart the vessel more to release bodies caught in the wreckage. This proved unsuccessful.

Over the next week rowboats with grappling hooks and pike poles probed the riverbed in another attempt to recover bodies. The dam at the Waterworks was opened to allow the water levels upstream to lower in another attempt to easily find human remains. Two more bodies were found this way.

On May 25, London began to bury the dead. The London Free Press reported hackmen raising their rates, liverymen charging five dollars for one and a half hours of service, and of draymen demanding various fees from grieving relatives.

The funerals of twenty-three-year-old Willie Glass and his nineteen-year-old fiance, Fanny Cooper, were held from the separate homes but blended into one procession on the way to the cemetery. The young couple were to have been married two weeks from the day of the wreck. Today in Mount Pleasant Cemetery in West London they rest in adjoining graves. A single headstone supporting a tall pillared arch covers the graves. The inscription, "They were lovely in their lives," begins on one pillar and continues, "and in death they were not divided," on the other.

It was difficult to find someone in London who wasn't affected by the tragedy with a death of a family member, neighbour, child or spouse.

A hastily formed committee of London citizens met on May 25 to plan a suitable memorial. John Labatt was present at the meeting. First plans favoured a stone monument in a city park but the needs of many families whose breadwinners had died in the disaster brought an end to this. One committee member commented, "The families of the victims are crying for bread. How ridiculous to offer them a stone!"

Some months later money was raised, taken among the parents who lost children in the disaster, to erect a small brick building on the grounds of the Protestant Orphans' Home in North London. For fifty years the cottage was used by the orphanage as an infirmary and later as a school. A stone above the front door carried the simple inscription: "In Memoriam, May, 1881." Years later the cottage was razed.

The London and Middlesex Historical Society later erected a monument in 1916 at the site of the sinking to commemorate the disaster.

=== Public reaction and lawsuits ===
Public outcry soon followed funeral and memorial processes, and the Forest City was soon condemned. She was soon laid up at the dock in Byron and sat to rot.

On June 1, Coroner Dr. J. Flock assembled a jury and a proper inquiry on the disaster went underway. The case for consideration was the manner in which passenger Fanny Cooper met her death. Incredibly the verdict never mentioned her by name, nor any other victims. Instead, the jury declared Captain Rankin responsible for the wreck, with partial blame being later cast to George Parish, the Victoria's engineer, who had passed the vessel as suitable for sailing at the beginning of the 1881 season. Parish was found to be guilty of neglecting to inform Rankin of the vessel's poor condition. Rankin was as well put to blame for failing to inspect the vessel before departing that day. The jury was convinced that the boiler had been improperly fastened to the deck, and that the stanchions supporting the upper deck and the hurricane roof were too slender, being made of pine and not properly braced.

The verdict found little favour in the press. One of the harshest public criticisms came from a Toronto Globe editorial: "The verdict of the coroner's jury is by no means satisfactory. The death of Miss Cooper was entirely ignored and it is impossible to discover whether the jury believed she perished as the result of carelessness or negligence of individuals. The capsizing of the boat is said to have been caused by water in the hold, a finding that in our opinion is very ill-supported by the evidence."

Both Rankin and Parish were arrested on manslaughter charges upon leaving the courtroom, but later released on a $3,000 bail each. The case came before the Middlesex Grand Jury at the fall assizes which opened in London on September 10, 1881. On September 22, the grand jury handed down its verdict, refusing to indict the men, freeing both Rankin and Parish.

=== Decline of riverboats on the Thames ===
The disaster made Londoners extremely reluctant to support the riverboat system in London, though vessels continued to run until the turn of the century. The expansion of the London Street Railway to Byron in 1895 aided in this decline, and after the flood of July 1883, the first of the two worst floods in London's history, the Princess Louise was swept over Waterworks Dam, dashing her to pieces and killing 7 people. The Forest City was also damaged on this day, having been cast into the river while being laid up.

For the next several years, riverboat services ceased. Many Londoners also stopped visiting the park, likely due to a combination of factors, as the city was growing and Port Stanley was becoming more popular for a swimming destination, and the sinking of the Victoria was still fresh in the city's memory. Because the Waterworks was seldom used during the latter half of the 1880s, the London Free Press ran several editorials in 1887 urging the resumption of riverboat transport to the park.

In May 1888, Captain David Foster launched two new steamboats - the City of London, and the Thames. May 25 would be the vessel's first voyage, however this time around and out of extreme caution in light of what befell the Victoria, Foster refused to exceed 300 passengers per trip.

Unfortunately, this brief resurrection in regular riverboat service was nowhere near as popular as it was prior to the sinking of the Victoria, and by 1894, the vessels were so overlooked, that Captain Foster was forced to retire the City of London, although the Thames was able to continue service until 1899, when she too was retired and scuttled by Foster just feet from Waterworks Dam.

== Legacy ==
The wreckage of the Victoria was mostly destroyed during salvage efforts for human remains, and remaining wooden portions of the vessel broke apart or rotted away. For years the vessel's steel-plated boiler rested on the riverbed, and was popular among youths as a jump-off point for diving into the river.

One of the few reminders of the disaster is that of a blue Ontario Heritage Plaque which sits with the painted anchor of the Victoria on the south side of the river at the site of the sinking. The plaque is located along the Terry Fox Parkway.

The surrounding area where the vessel sank is today the West London suburb of Kensal Park, and Greenway Off-Leash Dog Park as well as the Greenway Wastewater Treatment Centre.

Most of the victims of the disaster are today buried in Mount Pleasant and Woodland Cemeteries, the latter of which just so happened to be the last port of call that the Victoria stopped at before coming to rest on the cold riverbed mere minutes later.

The Victoria Day Disaster today is a well-known event in history to many Londoners, although the individual stories of those lost in the shipwreck are mostly shrouded in mystery or lack of information.

In 2016, Woodland Cemetery held a walking tour with local historian Dan Brock for the 135th anniversary of the disaster.

In 2022, various pieces were dedicated in memory of the disaster at downtown London's Ivey Park. Artists Gil Clelland and Bronagh Morgan painted a memorial mural of the Victoria. Musicians Jury Kobayashi, Eve Thompson, and Mary Ashton performed pieces, and historical interpreter Dan Ebbs portrayed Captain Rankin.

== In popular culture ==
London historian Daniel "Dan" J. Brock has shed light on many aspects of the disaster in recent years. He has been dedicated to finding as much information as possible on the shipwreck. His 2011 book "Fragments from the Forks" includes a great deal of information on the disaster.
