= Wildwood Dam =

- Interactive map of Wildwood Dam
- Official name: Wildwood Dam
- Coordinates: 43°15′45.97″N 81°4′26.44″W
- Construction began: 1962
- Opening date: 1965
- Construction cost: $3.5 million

Dam and spillways
- Impounds: Thames River
- Length: 9.3 kilometres

Wildwood Dam is a dam located on Trout Creek in Perth South, Ontario, which flows into the North Thames River in the Town of St. Marys. Wildwood Dam is designed for flood control and flow augmentation purposes.

It cost: $2 million to build—Provincial government 37.5%, Federal government 37.5%, UTRCA 25% (benefitting watershed municipalities) It is one of three dams on the Thames River (Ontario) and its tributaries.

== See also ==
- List of reservoirs and dams in Canada
- Upper Thames River Conservation Authority
- Pittock Dam (Thames River)
- Fanshawe Dam (Thames River)
