= Fanshawe Lake =

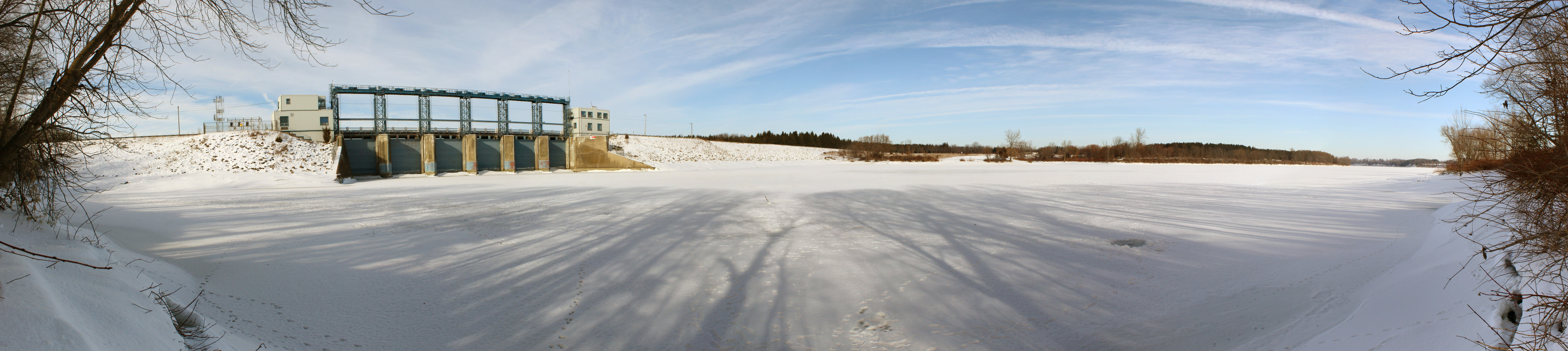
- Fanshawe dam in winter

- Location within Ontario
- Location: Ontario
- Coordinates: 43°3′26″N 81°10′31″W
- Type: reservoir
- Primary inflows: Thames River
- Catchment area: 1,450 square kilometres (560 sq mi)
- Basin countries: Canada
- Max. length: 6.4 kilometres (4.0 mi)
- Max. width: 0.8 kilometres (0.50 mi)
- Surface area: 2.6 kilometres (1.6 mi)
- Average depth: 12.5 metres (41 ft)
- Max. depth: 21.6 metres (71 ft)

Fanshawe Lake is a small man-made lake east of London, Ontario. It is fed by the Thames River from the north, and is separated from the river to the southwest by Fanshawe Dam. The reservoir has a typical surface area of 2.6 km^{2}, with a maximum area of 6.5 km^{2} at full capacity, and a maximum summertime depth of 12.5 m, and maximum depth of 21.6 m at full capacity.

Fanshawe Lake is a popular rowing venue, hosting several regattas throughout the year, the lake is home to the London Training Centre for Canada's women's national rowing team, the University of Western Ontario's rowing team and Western-Middlesex Rowing Club.

The Fanshawe Lake trail also surrounds the lake, a 22–25 km dirt path that is used for mountain biking, trail running, and hiking.

Because of the large amount of agricultural runoff in the Thames watershed, the river and reservoir have a consistently high Phosphorus concentration. This local excess has caused persistent water quality issues, leading to the lake being closed to swimming in 2009 due to the presence of blue/green algae.
