= Pittock Dam =

- Location in Southern Ontario and Ontario Pittock Dam (Ontario)
- Official name: Pittock Dam
- Country: Canada
- Location: Woodstock, Ontario
- Coordinates: 43.1487°N 80.7607°W

Dam and spillways
- Impounds: Thames River

Reservoir
- Creates: Pittock Reservoir

The Pittock Dam is a dam in Woodstock, Ontario, Canada. It lies on the main branch of the Thames River, and creates the Pittock Reservoir. This artificial lake forms the northeast boundary of the City of Woodstock.

The dam is designed for both flood control and flow augmentation purposes. It is designed to benefit water quality downstream during dry summer conditions and provide year-round flood control capability to protect downstream communities. Construction was started on the dam in 1964 and officially completed in 1967. The cost of the dam and land base at that time was close to $6 million. As of 2016, annual maintenance costs are estimated at $40,000. The Pittock Conservation Area consists of a narrow strip of land bordering either side of the reservoir.

== See also ==
- List of reservoirs and dams in Canada
- Upper Thames River Conservation Authority
- Wildwood Dam (Thames River, St Marys, Ontario)
- Fanshawe Dam (Thames River, London, Ontario)
