= Springbank Park =

Park in London, Ontario, Canada

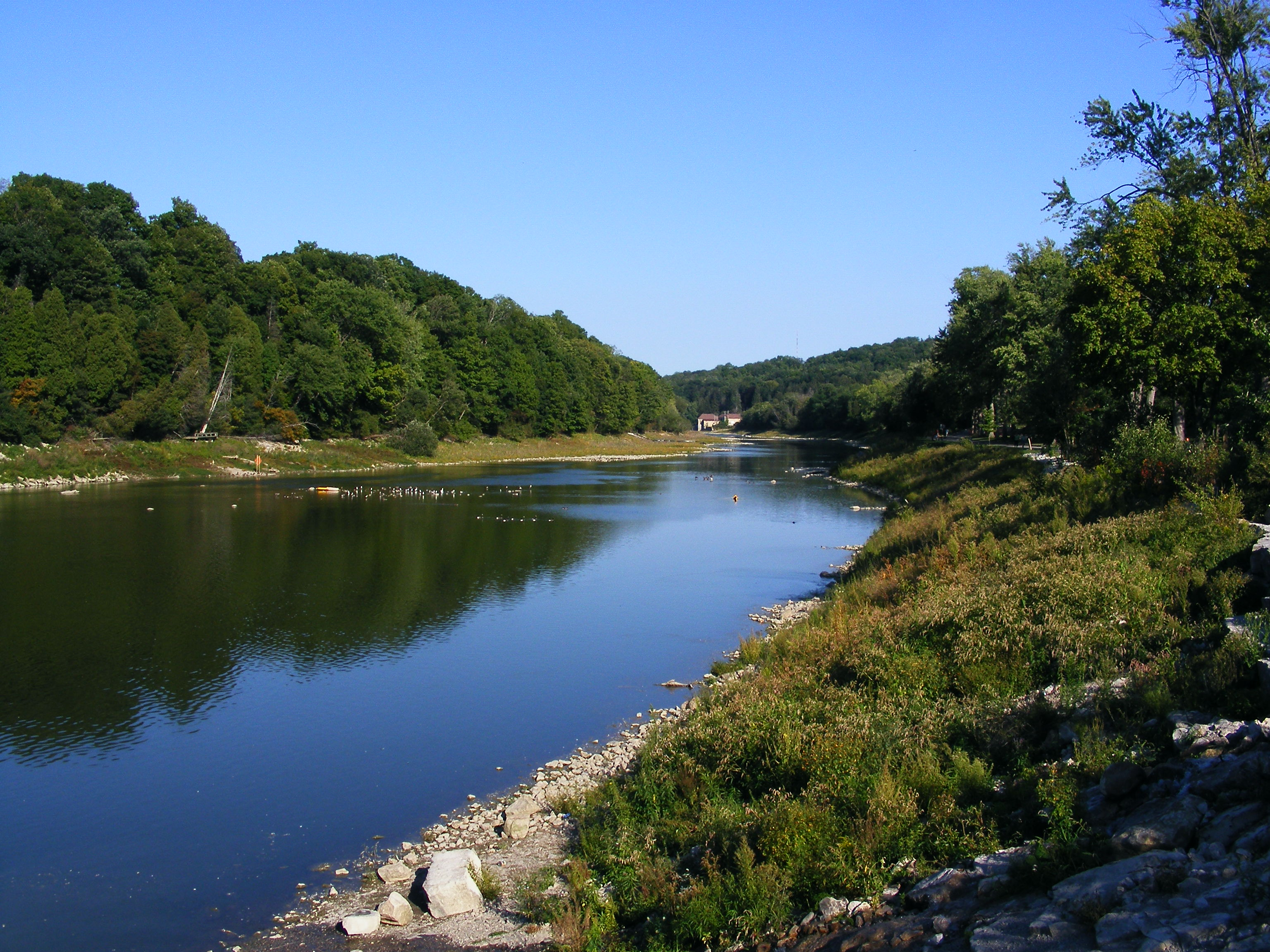
- The Thames River in Springbank Park
- Interactive map of Springbank Park
- Type: Public park
- Location: London, Ontario, Canada
- Coordinates: 42°57′25″N 81°19′17″W
- Area: 300 acres (120 ha)
- Operator: City of London

Springbank Park is a 120-hectare (300 acre) park located along a stretch of the Thames River in London, Ontario, Canada. The largest park in London, it contains 30 km (19 mi) of trails and is home to Storybook Gardens, a family attraction open year-round.

== History ==
Springbank Park was originally developed around the site of a waterworks facility in the late 19th century. Alderman James Egan suggested the nearby Hungerford Hill, now commonly known as "Reservoir Hill". In the years following the creation of the waterworks the city began to purchase more land in the surrounding area and the spot became a resort serviced by steamboat to and from London via the Thames River.

During the year 1896 the London Street Railway constructed and began service of a streetcar system to take people to and from Springbank Park in record amounts.

In the years to follow the additions to the park would include tennis and bowling lawns, zoo, campground, amusement park and a dance hall all before 1925.

As time passed on, London grew around the park; around 1920, a miniature train was added as an attraction, and as of 2022 it still exists, although relocated and replaced.

In the 1960s, the riverboat Storybook Queen was launched in the Thames and gave visitors to Storybook Gardens a taste of the long-over age of riverboat travel.

=== Sinking of Victoria ===
On May 24, 1881, the steamboat Victoria capsized and sank close to Cove Bridge after the boiler broke free and crashed through the supports holding up the second deck, causing the decks to collapse onto one another. Hundreds of people drowned or suffered burns, and 182 bodies were recovered from the site. Many believe more bodies are still trapped under the shipwreck. This disaster is widely known among those living in London, and when it happened, it severely cut back the popularity of steamer travel along the Thames and scaled back the popularity of the waterworks grounds. The shipwreck of the Victoria was eventually removed, but there is still part of the wreck sitting under the mud on the bottom of the river, and it can be seen during low water levels. Afterwards the grounds could still be reached by carriage and eventually horse-drawn bus, but interest would not recover for years.

== Storybook Gardens ==
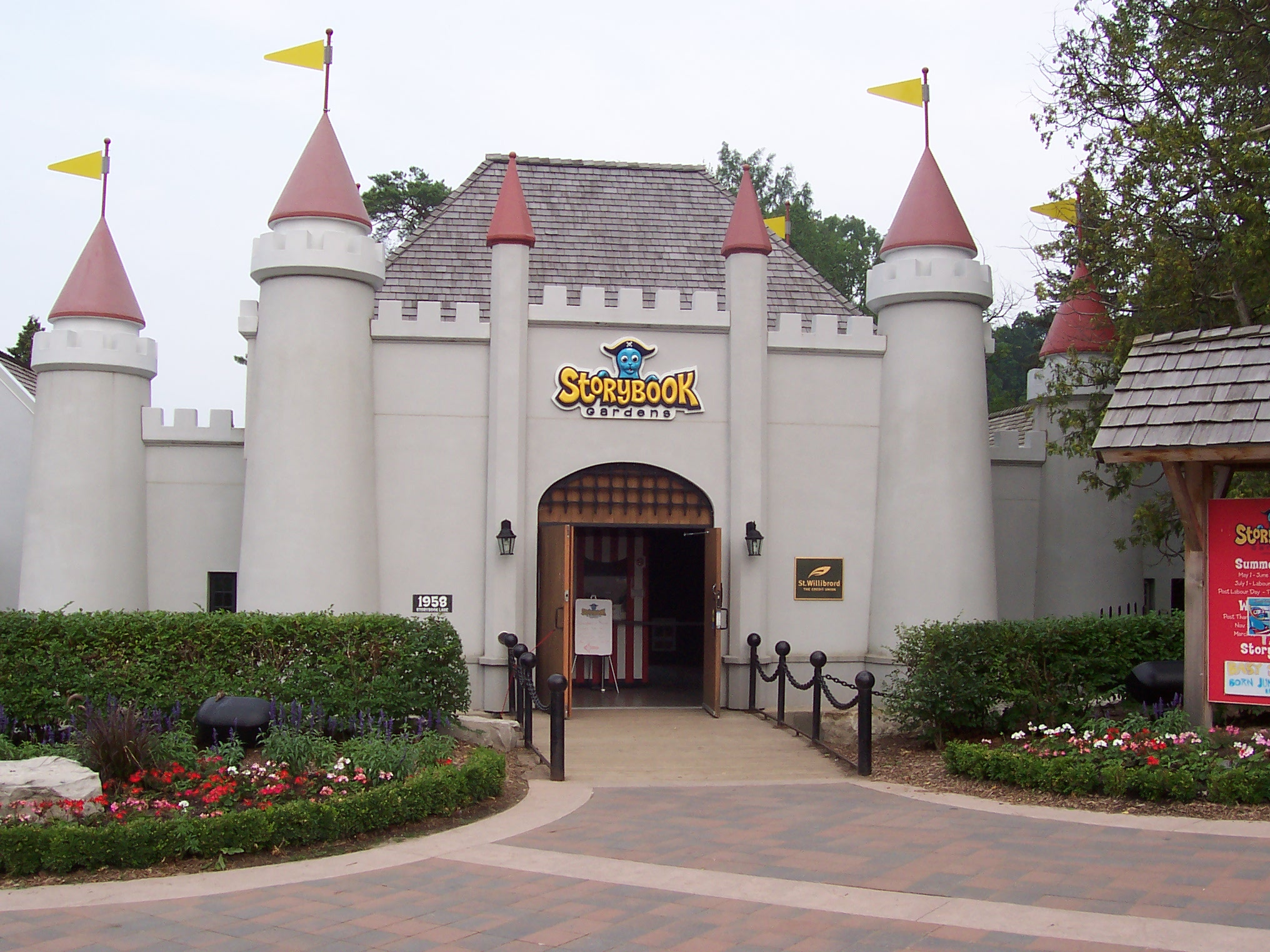
The castle-like entryway to Storybook Gardens

Storybook Gardens opened in 1958. This popular attraction included sea lions (later replaced by harbour seals) and various other animals tied in with themes from children's nursery rhymes and stories. On June 16, 1958, "Slippery the Seal" escaped from a pool into the nearby Thames River. Ten days later, amid intense publicity and "sightings" of various degrees of reliability, the sea lion turned up 400 km away near Sandusky, Ohio. After several days on display to record-breaking crowds, the Americans returned Slippery. The mayor of London proclaimed "Slippery Day" and thousands lined the streets to see Slippery's return. An "international incident" staged between Storybook and the Toledo Zoo was later revealed to have been a publicity stunt.

The park also includes a carousel, a miniature train (which are both placed just outside the park), climbing facilities and slides which have been upgraded throughout the years. In 2003 Storybook Gardens underwent a major refurbishment to its present state and is now open year-round with skating in the winter.

No animals currently reside here now: a fire claimed the barn in which the animals were housed, though the animals were unhurt and sent to live elsewhere. On June 8, 2012, while the remaining four seals at Storybook gardens were being transported to the Saint Louis Zoo, two seals, Peanut and Atlantis, died. A third seal, Cri Cri, died on June 13 while being treated.

== Modern use ==
At present, Springbank Park is the largest park in London, with trails accommodating biking or walking. There is a playground, swings, a wading pool, picnic areas and soccer fields. With paths leading to adjoining parks one can travel 10 km directly from Byron to downtown London without traffic.
