= Fanshawe Dam =

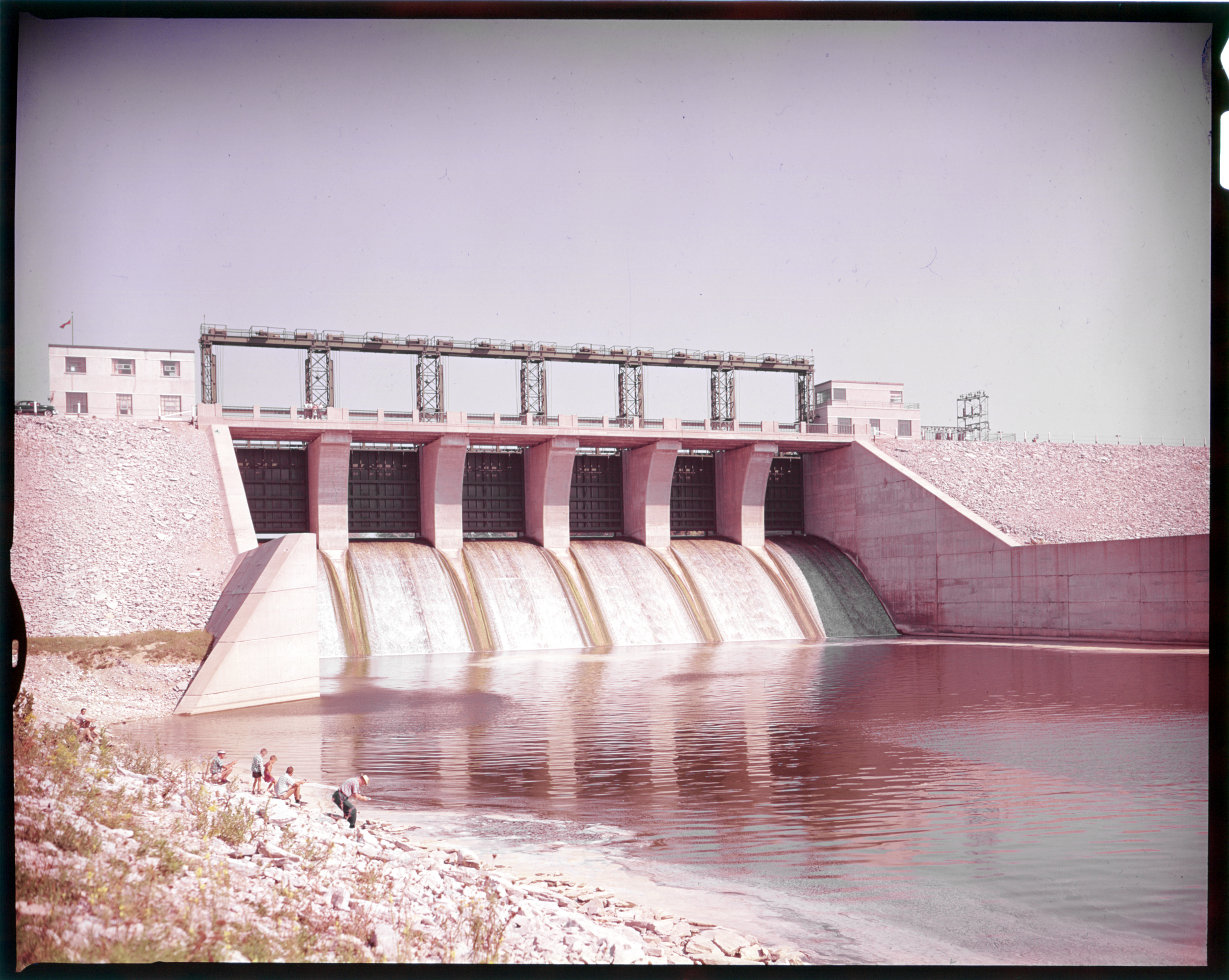
- Interactive map of Fanshawe Dam
- Official name: Fanshawe Dam
- Coordinates: 43.04158°N 81.182239°W
- Construction began: 1950
- Opening date: 1952
- Construction cost: $5 million

Dam and spillways
- Impounds: Thames River
- Height: 30.5 metres
- Length: 625 metres

Reservoir
- Creates: Fanshawe Lake
- Total capacity: 48 billion litres
- Catchment area: 1450 km2
- Surface area: 2.61 km2 typical, 6.5 km2 maximum

Fanshawe Dam is a concrete/earthen embankment dam located on North Thames River near the eastern edge of London, Ontario. The crest of the dam is 625 metres long. It is 30.5 metres in height and drops the river surface 12 metres. Fanshawe Lake is the reservoir created by the dam.

The dam was originally constructed for the purpose of flood control after a series of devastating floods in the early 20th century, including the catastrophic 1937 flood that left five dead, 1,100 homes destroyed, and $3 million in damages. The Upper Thames River Conservation Authority was created for this purpose, and led the construction of the Fanshawe Dam.

Fanshawe Dam is one of three major dams on the Thames River and its tributaries, sitting downstream from Wildwood Dam. It is also downstream of the small Thomas Orr dam on the Avon River in Stratford. The North Thames watershed includes the towns of Stratford, St. Marys, Mitchell, and areas of West Perth, Perth East, Perth South, and Thames Centre.

Construction of the dam began in 1950 and completed in 1952. It cost $5 million - Federal government 37.5%, Provincial government 37.5%, Upper Thames River Conservation Authority 25% (95% from City of London, Ontario, 5% from London Township).

Fanshawe Dam has a typical summertime outflow of 4 cm3/s, with the highest outflow occurring during spring snow-melt season peaking as high as 3,200 cm3/s. As the dam is primarily a flow-control structure, it can reduce downstream flooding by 10-50% provided there is sufficient storage space available.

In 1984 a hydroelectric generator constructed, generating enough electricity to power 400 households. The generator is operated as a Run-of-the-river generating station without impacting the reservoir levels. The plant produces 2,860 MWh/year, with all excess sold to London Hydro.

A seismograph is placed inside the dam by the University of Western Ontario’s geology department.

== See also ==
- List of reservoirs and dams in Canada
- Pittock Dam (Thames River)
- Wildwood Dam (Thames River)
