= Ontario Car Company =

Canadian vehicle manufacturer

Ontario Car Company was a freight car, passenger car, and horsecar manufacturer based in London, Ontario, from 1872 to 1886.

The company was sometimes referenced as T. Muir after company manager Thomas Muir and London Car Works.

The facility was located on east side of Rectory Street north of Cabell Street.

== Products ==
Ontario Car made wooden freight and passenger cars for various railways in Ontario and Quebec:

- Great Western Railway
- Grand Trunk Railway
- Canada Southern Railway
- Intercolonial Railway
- St. Lawrence & Ottawa, Midland Railway
- Quebec, Montreal, Ottawa and Occidental Railway
- New Brunswick Railway
- Quebec Central Railway
- Canadian Pacific Railway

A small number of horsecars were made for smaller streetcar operators:

- London Street Railway

Ontario Car last made cars in 1886 and disappeared by 1890.
