= London Transit =

Canadian public transit system

- A New Flyer XD40 in 2026
- Founded: 1951 (from London Street Railway)
- Headquarters: 450 Highbury Avenue N
- Service area: London, Ontario
- Service type: Public Transit
- Routes: 28 regular; 6 express; 2 rapid transit (2027/2028); 4 school; 6 community
- Fleet: 254 buses (15 articulated, 239 standard)
- Annual ridership: 17.46 million (2025)
- Operator: City of London
- General Manager: Kelly S. Paleczny
- Website: https://www.londontransit.ca

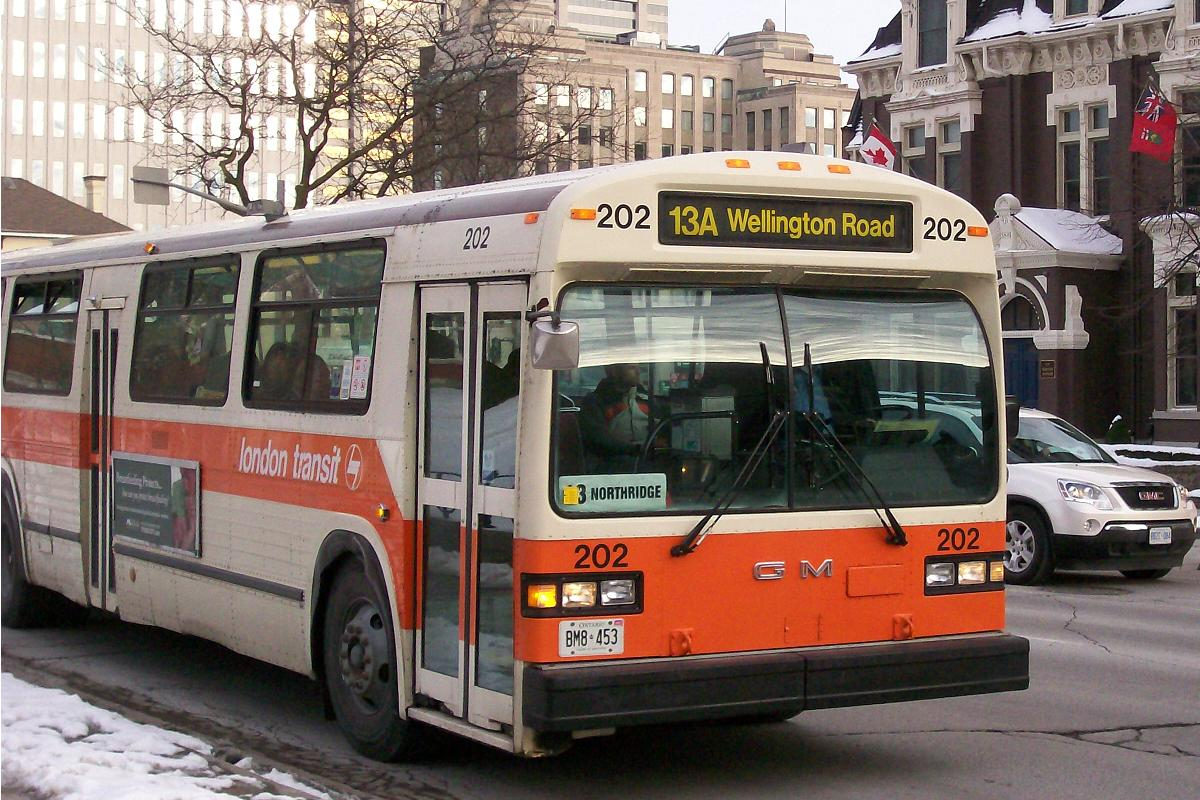
A retired GM Classic bus in the old colour scheme

The London Transit Commission (LTC) is the operator of the public transit system of London, Ontario, Canada. It operates transit bus service and para-transit service. In 2025, annual ridership totaled 17.46 million. As of 2026, the LTC has 28 regular bus routes, six express routes, four university and college routes that run during the post-secondary school year, and six community bus routes that each run one day per week.

Rapid Transit, formerly known as Shift, is a bus rapid transit (BRT) system under construction. The network consists of two corridors that converge at a central downtown hub. As of October 2024, the East London Link is scheduled for completion in 2026, with operations expected to begin in mid-2027 and a target opening in August 2027. The Wellington Gateway is expected to be completed by 2027, with operations slated to begin in summer 2028.

== History ==
=== London Street Railway ===
London Street Railway Company (LSR), a privately operated transit service, brought public transit to the city with the start of horse-drawn streetcar operations May 24, 1875, on Dundas Street.

==== Fleet ====
- Single truck horsecars from Ontario Car Company.
- Large double truck cars from Ottawa Car Company were acquired in 1903 (5) and 1907.
- 5 ex-Cleveland Railway Peter Witts arrived in 1923.
- Ex-Montreal Park & Island Railway cars - non-enclosed cars

==== Facilities ====
- Car barns at Dundas and Lyle Streets - since demolished

==== Routes ====
- Dundas Street - Eva Street to Wharncliffe Road; north on Wharncliffe to Oxford Street; east on Oxford to Gunn Street
- Adelaide Street - Dundas Street to Central Avenue; along Central to Clarence Street
- Oxford Street - Clarence Street to Adelaide Street
- Ridout Street - Garfield West to Horton Street; along Garfield to Wortley Road to Briscoe Street to Elmwood Avenue; Elmwood to Wharncliffe Highway; to Askin Street to Stanley Road; to Elmwood Avenue to Ridout
- Hamilton Road - Egerton to Maitland Street and Horton Street; Horton Street from Maitland to Thames Street; north of Thames to Stanley Street; along Stanley to Wharncliffe Highway
- Central Avenue - from Adelaide to Clarence Street
- Richmond Street - Horton Street to St James Street; along St James to Wellington Street then Clarence Street to Regent; along Regent to Clarence and then north to Huron Street
- Springbank Park
- South Street - Hamilton Road to Horton Street to Richmond Street or Thames Street; either north to Stanley Street to Ridout north to Dundas Street or Richmond Street to Dundas Street

==== Ownership ====
Privately owned from 1875 to 1920, the Ontario Railway and Municipal Board took over control of LSR in 1920.

==== Demise ====
The Springbank Park streetcar route ended in 1936, and all remaining streetcar routes ended by 1940. In later years, the city would assume operation of some routes. In 1951, the city assumed control over all routes and formed the London Transportation Commission to operate them. Until 1940, streetcars provided the bulk of the service. The streetcar system was fully converted to buses in late November 1940 (originally planned for the end of 1940, but hastened by a blizzard that damaged trolley wires).

=== London Transit ===
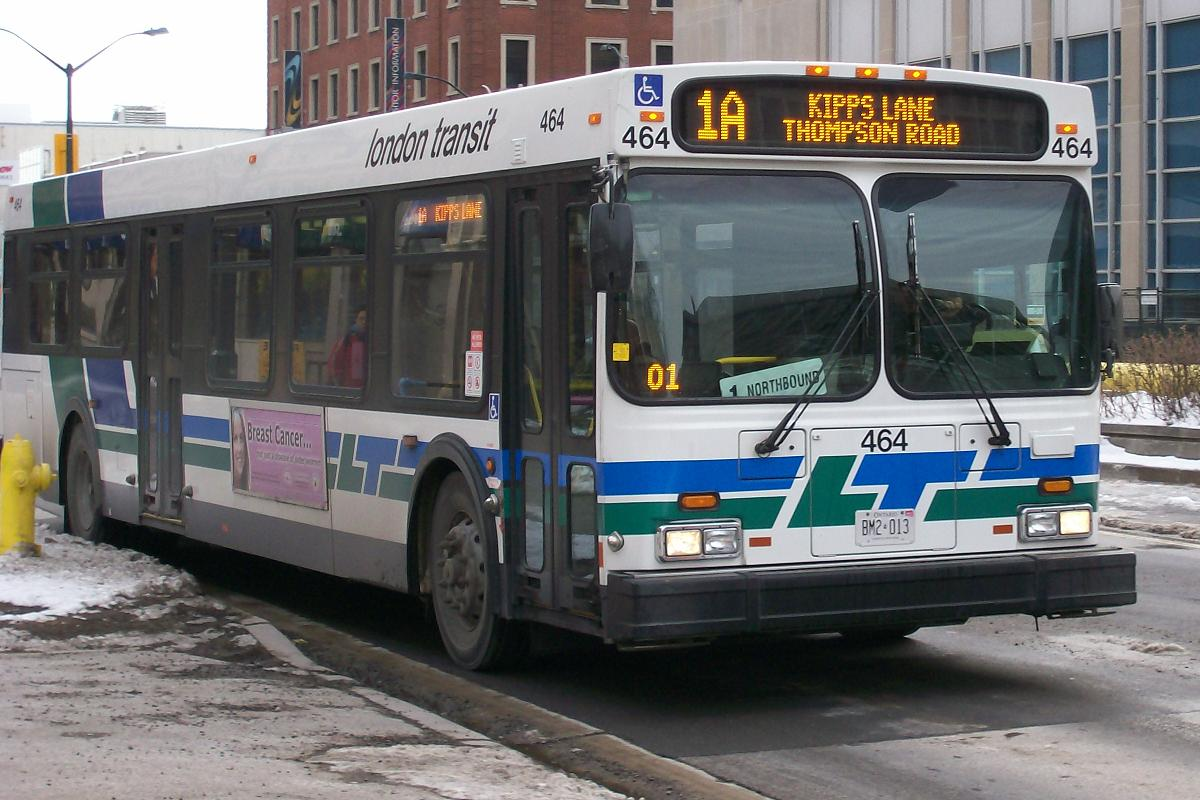
A New Flyer Low Floor in service in 2007

In 1974, the LTC adopted its present name, and greatly expanded its service area to cover the newly annexed area in Middlesex County. The system has evolved to feature community bus routes, para-transit services and accessible low floor buses with the express lines as the backbone. In 2003, the LTC opened bus terminals at Argyle and Masonville malls.

=== 2009 transit strike ===
On November 16, 2009, Amalgamated Transit Union (ATU) Local 741 representing bus drivers and support workers went on strike, the first transit strike for London Transit since 1980. The strike affected all public routes; however, specialized transit services for the disabled continued to operate.

To lessen the inconvenience on university students, the University of Western Ontario (UWO) increased its shuttle bus service. As well, the University Students' Council (USC) secured rental vans driven by volunteers, looping around the city picking up students at key areas and dropping them off at the university. A community-based approach was taken by the USC including a flag-a-ride program and a shuttle service for groceries. David Empey, president of the UWO staff association, was against this volunteer service, calling it "scab labour". He said it was irresponsible to set up a system which replaced the job of striking workers. Despite this, pickets were set up at the university encouraging students to help their cause. "The strike is really inconveniencing people who are paid even less than the drivers," said a third-year Western student. "This shuttle is a good idea. I had hoped they'd put something like this together. We still have to pay for our transit pass [even if there's a strike]".

On December 7, 2009, ATU turned down the LTC's "Final Offer" of 9.3% wage hike over three years. This offer was rejected by 78.5% (322 of 410) of the ATU membership.

The strike ended on December 14, 2009.

=== MagusCards ===
In October 2021, London Transit partnered with MagusCards to help those with autism or other cognitive special needs. This is one of the key initiatives outlined in the LTC's five-year Accessibility Plan to make the city's transit system more accessible and easier to navigate.

== Fleet ==
| Year | Manufacturer | Model | Fleet numbers | Engine | Transmission | Photo |
|---|---|---|---|---|---|---|
| 2013 | New Flyer | XD60 | 29 | Cummins ISL9 (EPA10) | Allison B500R | Bus 29 on Route 36A |
| 2014 | New Flyer | XD60 | 30-31 | Cummins ISL9 (EPA10) | Allison B500R | Bus 30 on Route 10 |
| 2015 | New Flyer | XD60 | 32 | Cummins ISL9 (EPA10) | Allison B500R | Bus 32 on Route 9 |
| 2016 | New Flyer | XD60 | 33 | Cummins ISL9 (EPA10) | Allison B500R | Bus 33 on Route 31 |
| 2017 | New Flyer | XD60 | 34 | Cummins L9 (EPA10 GHG1) | Allison B500R | Bus 34 on Route 31 |
| 2022 | New Flyer | XD60 | 35-36 | Cummins L9 (EPA21 GHG2) | Allison B500R | Bus 36 on Route 4A |
| 2024 | New Flyer | XD60 | 37 | Cummins L9 (EPA24) | Allison B500R | Bus 37 on Route 15A |
| 2025 | New Flyer | XD60 | 38-41 | Cummins L9 (EPA24) | Allison B500R | Bus 41 on Route 17A |
| 2026 | New Flyer | XD60 | 42-43 | Cummins L9 (EPA24) | Allison B500R | Bus 42 on Route 31 |
| 2027 | New Flyer | XD60 | 44-52 (ON ORDER) | Cummins X10 (EPA27) | TBD | |
| 2013 | New Flyer | XD40 | 323, 332 | Cummins ISL9 (EPA10) | Allison B400R | Bus 329 on Route 10 |
| 2014 | New Flyer | XD40 | 333-347 | Cummins ISL9 (EPA10) | Allison B400R | Bus 339 on Route 10 |
| 2015 | New Flyer | XD40 | 348-364 | Cummins ISL9 (EPA10) | Allison B400R | Bus 355 on Route 94 |
| 2016 | New Flyer | XD40 | 365-378 | Cummins ISL9 (EPA10) | Allison B400R | Bus 365 on Route 2B |
| 2017 | New Flyer | XD40 | 501-527 | Cummins L9 (EPA10 GHG1) | Allison B400R | Bus 525 to Route 94 |
| 2018 | New Flyer | XD40 | 528-546 | Cummins L9 (EPA10 GHG1) | Allison B400R | Bus 543 on Route 13A |
| 2019 | New Flyer | XD40 | 547-555 | Cummins L9 (EPA10 GHG1) | Allison B400R | Bus 549 on Route 90 |
| 2020 | New Flyer | XD40 | 556-571 | Cummins L9 (EPA10 GHG1) | Allison B400R | Bus 558 on Route 13 |
| 2021 | New Flyer | XD40 | 572-590 | Cummins L9 (EPA21 GHG2) | Allison B400R | Bus 580 on Route 2A |
| 2022 | New Flyer | XD40 | 591-610 | Cummins L9 (EPA21 GHG2) | Allison B400R | Bus 608 on Route 25 |
| 2024 | New Flyer | XD40 | 611-634 | Cummins L9 (EPA24) | Allison B400R | Bus 621 in Highbury Garage after Route 19 |
| 2025 | New Flyer | XD40 | 635-664 | Cummins L9 (EPA24) | Allison B400R | Bus 663 on Route 91 |
| 2026 | New Flyer | XD40 | 665-691 | Cummins L9 (EPA24) | Allison B400R | Bus 686 at Highbury Garage; not yet in service. |
| 2027 | New Flyer | XD40 | 701-717 (ON ORDER) | Cummins X10 (EPA27) | TBD | |

== Bus rapid transit ==
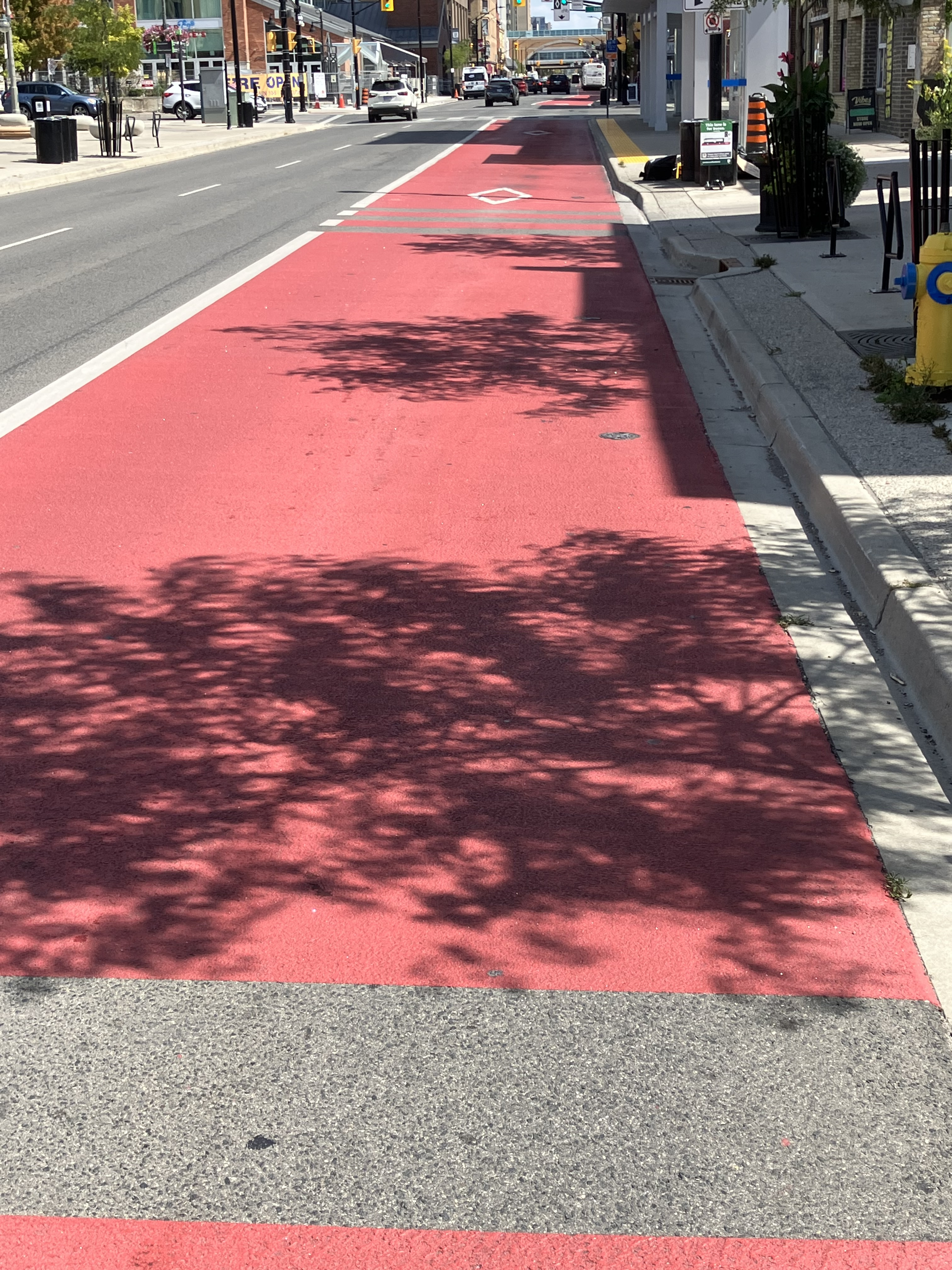
Bus lane along King Street

Rapid Transit, formerly known as Shift, is a bus rapid transit (BRT) network under construction in London, Ontario, consisting of two corridors that converge at a central downtown hub. The project aims to improve traffic flow, enhance streetscapes, and replace aging underground infrastructure.

The rapid transit system features dedicated bus lanes, including curbside and centre-running lanes, and transit priority signals for smoother operations. Enhanced stations are being designed to accommodate large passenger loads, with seating areas, route information, security cameras, and tempered glass for safety and comfort. The project also includes the installation of new streetscape elements and urban design improvements, which will help ease traffic flow and improve the overall public transit experience in London.

As of October 2024, the East London Link is scheduled for completion in 2026, with operations expected to begin in mid-2027. The route will run between downtown and Fanshawe College, with a target opening in August 2027. Similarly, the Wellington Gateway project is expected to be completed by 2027, with service slated to begin in mid-2028 and a summer 2028 opening for the segment between downtown and White Oaks Mall.

== Ridership ==
After the public transit boom of the 1960s and 1970s, ridership began to slip. At that time, almost every transit route passed through London's downtown area. An attempted building of two downtown malls and the economic recession of the 1990s combined to force the downtown area into serious decline. An economic slump echoed in a parallel drop in ridership, made even worse by the traditional responses of service cuts and fare increases. Between 1987 and 1996, LTC ridership declined by almost 40 percent.

In 1994, the LTC began developing a comprehensive business plan to turn these trends around. Innovations included an overhauling of fare structure, re-thinking routes, bringing buses into mall areas (which would later become true terminal areas), and making standard public transit buses increasingly wheelchair-accessible. Post-secondary students attending the University of Western Ontario and Fanshawe College now receive a subsidized bus pass incorporated into their tuition.

In 2020, after a period of increasing ridership, ridership decreased due to the COVID-19 pandemic, cutting jobs for drivers and reducing service in areas with low ridership to match the decreased demand. During the first months of the pandemic beginning in March 2020, passengers were required to board and exit from the rear door and the collection of fares was suspended as a result, though people with accessibility needs could still board and exit at the front of the bus. Fare collection and boarding via the front door were resumed in August 2020.

Between 2024 and 2025, yearly ridership dropped by 9% (1.77 million rides), owing in large part to the decrease in international students (who have university and college bus passes) due to a change in federal policy. The LTC's 2025 annual report noted that rides per capita have continually decreased year over year, indicating that service growth has not kept pace with the city's population growth, which the report called "problematic", as many routes experience crowding.

== Routes ==
=== Regular routes ===
Buses serving these routes stop at blue bus-stop signs. The bus destination signs display the route number "to" a destination "via" a street or neighbourhood. These routes are up to date as of April 11, 2026.

| Route | | Terminus | | Terminus | Via | Service |
|---|---|---|---|---|---|---|
| 1A | N | Kipps Lane | S | Pond Mills | Wellington & Dundas | Daily |
| 1B | N | Kipps Lane | S | King Edward | Wellington & Dundas | Daily |
| 2A | W | Natural Science | E | Trafalgar Heights | Hale & Trafalgar | Daily |
| 2B | W | Natural Science | E | Bonaventure | Dundas Street | Daily |
| 3 | W | Downtown | E | Argyle Mall | Hamilton Road | Daily |
| 4A | N | Fanshawe College | S | White Oaks Mall | Downtown | Daily |
| 4B | N | Fanshawe College | S | White Oaks Mall | Downtown | Daily |
| 5A | W | Byron | E | Argyle Mall | Springbank Drive/Downtown | Daily |
| 5B | W | Byron | E | Argyle Mall | Gardenwood Drive/Downtown | Monday - Saturday |
| 6 | N | University Hospital | S | Parkwood Institute | Richmond Street | Daily |
| 7 | W | Westmount Mall | E | Argyle Mall | Downtown/York Street | Daily |
| 9 | N | Fanshawe & Wonderland | S | Downtown | Limberlost | Daily |
| 10 | W | Masonville Mall | E | Huron & Barker | Wonderland & Highbury | Daily |
| 12 | S | Wharncliffe & Wonderland | N | Downtown | Wharncliffe Road | Daily |
| 13 | N | Masonville Mall | S | White Oaks Mall | Richmond & Wellington | Daily |
| 13A | N | Masonville Mall | S | White Oaks Mall | Wellington, Richmond & Westminster Park | Daily |
| 15A | W | Dalhousie | E | Huron Heights | Downtown | Daily |
| 15B | W | Cranbrook & Commissioners | E | Huron Heights | Downtown | Daily |
| 16 | N | Masonville Mall | S | Pond Mills | Adelaide Street | Daily |
| 17A | W | Byron | E | Argyle Mall | Oxford Street | Daily |
| 17B | W | Riverbend | E | Argyle Mall | Oxford Street | Monday - Friday. |
| 19 | S | Downtown | N | Stoney Creek | Hyde Park Road | Daily |
| 20 | W | Beaverbrook | E | Fanshawe College | Downtown | Daily |
| 24 | W | Talbot Village | E | Summerside | Commissioners Road | Daily |
| 25 | W | Masonville Mall | E | Fanshawe College | Fanshawe Park Road | Daily |
| 27 | W | Capulet Lane | E | Fanshawe College | Western University | Daily |
| 28 | W | Lambeth | E | White Oaks Mall | Exeter Road | Monday - Friday, Peak Periods only. |
| 30 | W | White Oaks Mall | E | Cheese Factory Road | Newbold & Wilton Grove Road | Monday - Friday, Peak Period & Late Evening service only |
| 31 | W | Hyde Park Power Centre | E | Alumni Hall | Aldersbrook Road | Daily |
| 33 | W | Proudfoot | E | Alumni Hall | Platt's Lane | Monday - Friday |
| 34 | CW | Masonville Mall | CCW | Masonville Mall | Northridge & Ambleside | Daily |
| 35 | N | Argyle Mall | S | Trafalgar Heights | Marconi Boulevard | Daily |
| 36 | W | Fanshawe College | E | London Airport | Oxford Street | Monday - Friday |
| 36A | W | Fanshawe College | E | London Airport | Huron and Robins Hill | Monday - Friday |
| 37 | N | Argyle Mall | S | Neptune Crescent | Sovereign Road | Monday - Friday Peak Periods only |
| 38 | N | Argyle Mall | S | Innovation Park | Clarke Road | Monday - Friday Peak Periods and Late Evening service only. |

=== Express routes ===
These routes are limited-stop service. Buses on Routes 90, 91, 92, 94 and 95 stop only at express bus stops, which have orange bus-stop signs. Buses on Route 93 provide express service (at orange-signed stops only) north of Wharncliffe & Highview and local service (at blue-signed stops) south of Wharncliffe & Highview.

| Route | | Terminus | | Terminus | Via | Service |
|---|---|---|---|---|---|---|
| 90 | N | Masonville Mall | S | White Oaks Mall | Downtown | Daily |
| 91 | W | Oxford & Wonderland | E | Fanshawe College | Oxford Street | Daily |
| 92 | N | Masonville Mall | S | Victoria Hospital | Adelaide Street | Monday - Friday, Peak Periods only. |
| 93 | N | Masonville Mall | S | White Oaks Mall | Wharncliffe/Western | Daily |
| 94 | W | Natural Science | E | Argyle Mall | Dundas Street | Monday - Friday, Peak Periods only. |
| 95 | S | White Oaks Mall | N | Fanshawe College | Highbury | Monday - Friday, Peak Periods only. |

=== Community routes ===
Community routes operate to provide special access to seniors and individuals with impaired mobility to major shopping destinations. They are not designed as an alternative to the Paratransit service. Routes 51 through 55 operate on this schedule. Route 56 operates on this schedule.

| Route | | Terminus | | Terminus | Service | Major Destinations |
|---|---|---|---|---|---|---|
| 51 | W | Sherwood Forest Mall | E | Cherryhill Village Mall | Monday | Cherryhill Circle, Forest Hill |
| 52 | W | Oakridge Superstore Plaza | E | Cherryhill Village Mall | Tuesday | Cherryhill Circle, Forest Hill |
| 53 | W | Hyde Park Power Centre | E | Cherryhill Village Mall | Wednesday | Cherryhill Circle, Forest Hill |
| 54 | W | Costco at Farrah Road | E | Cherryhill Village Mall | Thursday | Cherryhill Circle, Forest Hill |
| 55 | N | Masonville Mall | S | Cherryhill Village Mall | Friday | Cherryhill Circle, Forest Hill |
| 56 | N | William Mercer Wilson Centre | S | White Oaks Mall (east side) | Wednesday | Wonderland at Commissioners, Montgomery at Southdale |

=== Western University and Fanshawe College routes (September - April only) ===
| Route | | Terminus | Via | | Terminus | Via | Service |
|---|---|---|---|---|---|---|---|
| 102 | N | Natural Science | Wharncliffe Road | S | Downtown | Richmond Street | Daily |
| 104 | N | Fanshawe College | Oxford Street | S | Downtown | Oxford Street | Monday - Saturday |
| 106 | N | Natural Science | Richmond Street | S | Downtown | Wharncliffe Road | Daily |
| 127 | E | Natural Science | Sarnia Road | W | Westmount Mall | Wonderland Road | Daily |

== See also ==
- London Street Railway – the precursor to the London Transit Commission
- Public Transit in Canada
