= Thames River (Ontario) =

River in Ontario, Canada

Thames River Antler River
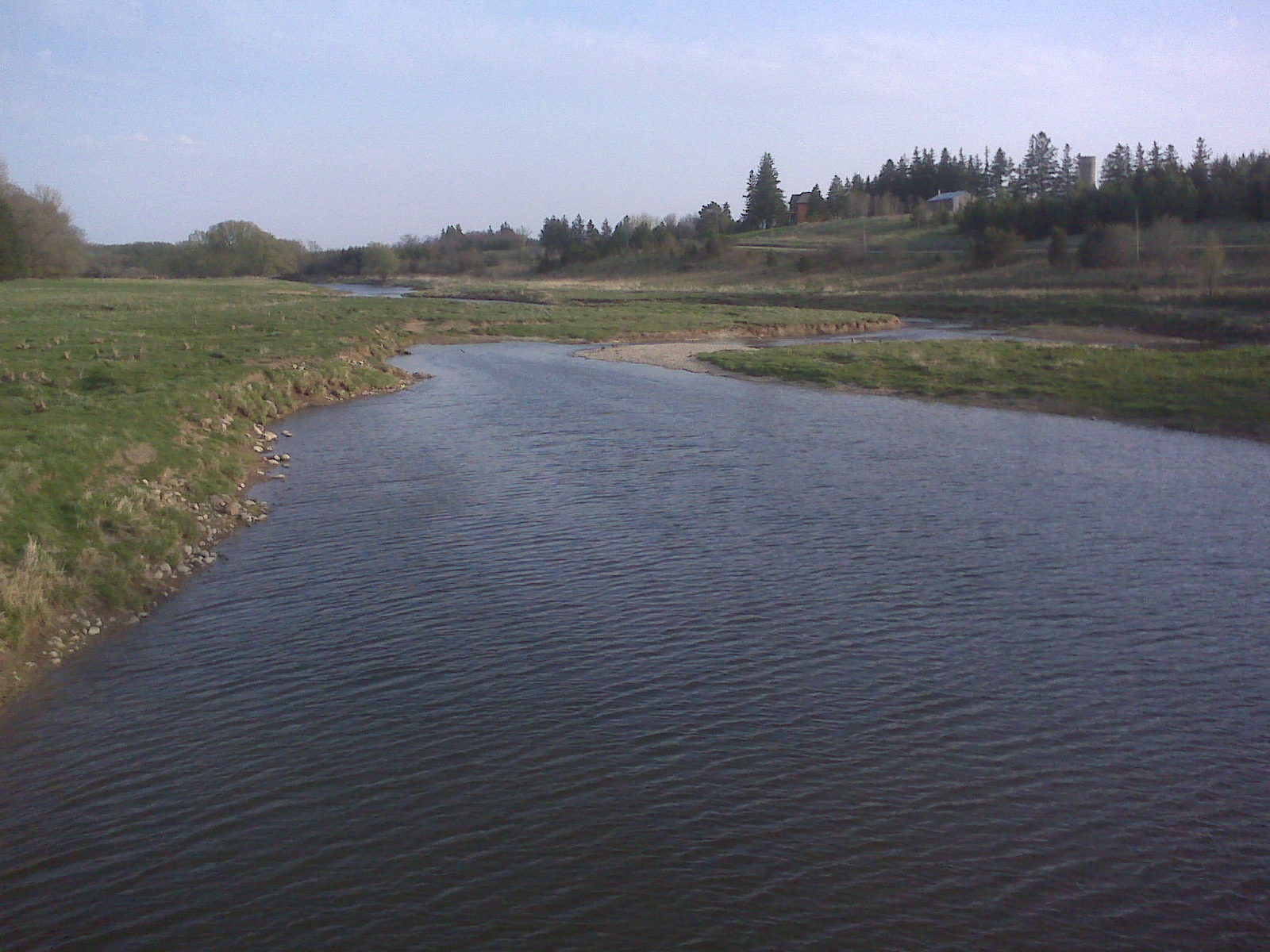
- North Thames River just upstream from its confluence with the Avon River near Stratford, Ontario
- Etymology: after the River Thames in England
- Native name: Deshkaan-ziibi / Eshkani-ziibi (Ojibwe)

Location
- Country: Canada
- Province: Ontario
- Region: Southwestern Ontario

Physical characteristics
- Source
  - location: Near Tavistock
- Mouth: Lake Saint Clair
  - location: Lighthouse Cove
  - coordinates: 42°19′9″N 82°27′15″W
  - elevation: 173 m (568 ft)
- Length: 273 km (170 mi)
- Basin size: 5,825 km^{2} (2,249 sq mi)
- Discharge
  - location: Chatham
  - average: 52.9 m^{3}/s (1,870 cu ft/s)
  - minimum: 8.25 m^{3}/s (291 cu ft/s)
  - maximum: 1,090 m^{3}/s (38,000 cu ft/s)

Basin features
- River system: Great Lakes Basin

The Thames River (/tɛmz/) is located in southwestern Ontario, Canada.

The Thames flows southwest for 273 kilometres (170 mi) through southwestern Ontario, from the Town of Tavistock through the cities of Woodstock, London and Chatham to Lighthouse Cove on Lake St. Clair. Its drainage basin is 5,825 square kilometres (2,249 sq mi).

The river is known as Deshkaan-ziibi / Eshkani-ziibi ("Antler River") in the Ojibwe language, spoken by Anishnaabe peoples who, along with the Neutrals prior to their disappearance in the 17th century, have lived in the area since before Europeans arrived. This name was anglicized as Escunnisepe as the first English name of the river. In 1793, Lieutenant Governor John Graves Simcoe named the river after the River Thames in England. Early French Canadians referred to it as La Tranche, for the wide and muddy waters of its lower section.

Much of the Thames was formerly surrounded by deciduous Carolinian forests, but much of this forest has been cleared to permit agriculture and other forms of development.

Two conservation authorities together have jurisdiction over the Thames River watershed, the Upper Thames River Conservation Authority and Lower Thames Valley Conservation Authority, and work to prevent damaging floods and undertake other resource management activities.

== Course ==
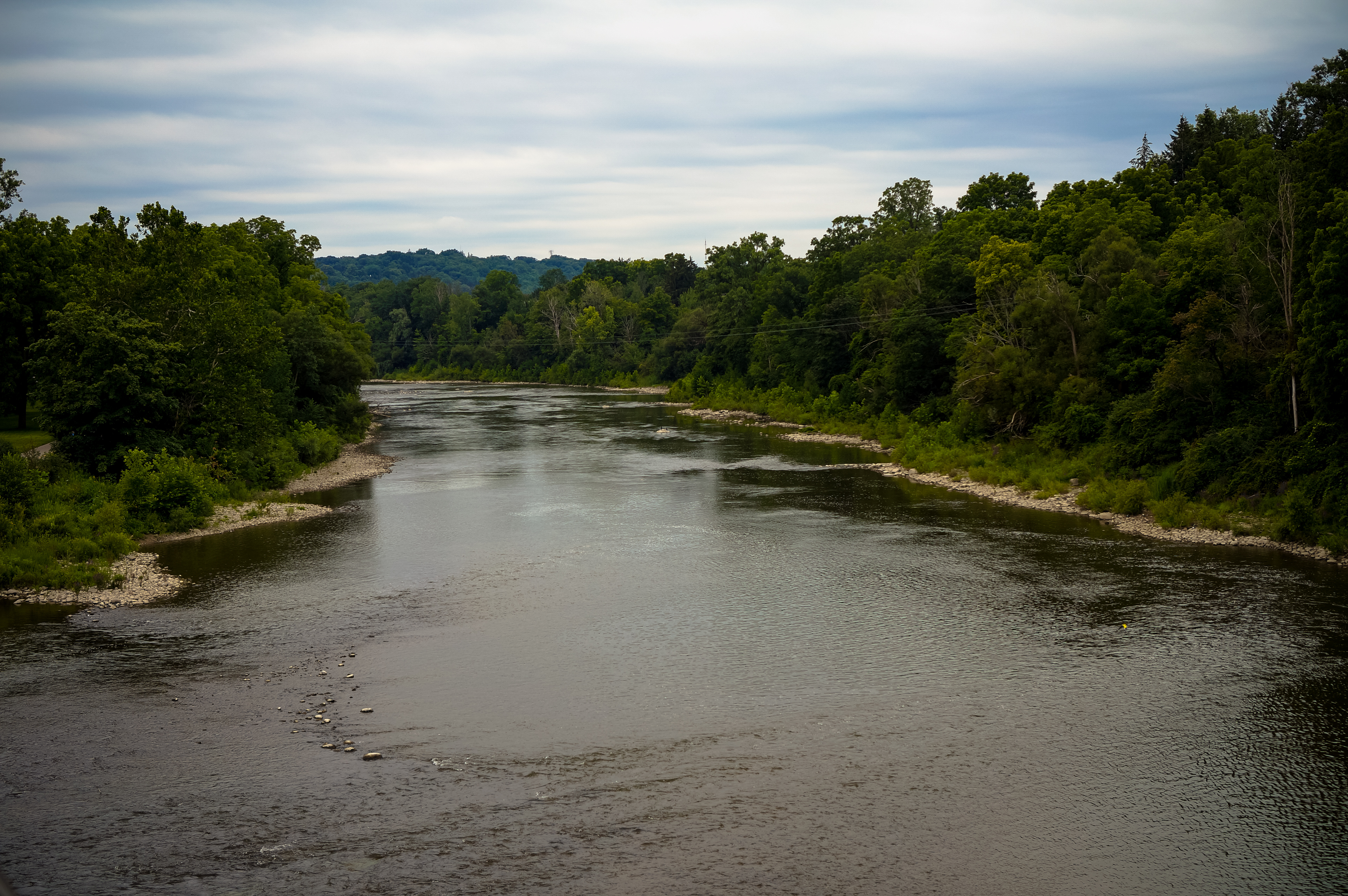
The Thames River in London, Ontario just west of Wonderland Road

There are three rivers in the watershed with Thames in the name—the Thames River itself, North Thames River, and Middle Thames River. These are also known locally as South Branch, North Branch, and Middle Branch. The South Branch, which begins as several field drains near Tavistock and initially flows southeasterly before turning southwesterly towards Woodstock, is the main stem Thames River and officially carries the Thames River name.

The Thames River and North Thames River in the upper part of the watershed flow through valleys created during the retreat of the Laurentide ice sheet during the last ice age. The Thames River and North Thames River meet in central London at the "Forks"; the University of Western Ontario is located north of the Forks at the north branch's confluence with Medway Creek. The Middle Thames River runs north of the Thames River joining it west of Ingersoll. Downriver from London, the lower part of the Thames flows through a shallow plain of sand and clay, with an average depth of 1.2 metres (4 ft). Urban areas the lower Thames flows through include Delaware, Chatham, Thamesville, as well as Chippewa and Oneida First Nations settlements. Tributaries of the three Thames Rivers include the Avon River, Dingman Creek, Jeanettes Creek, McGregor Creek, Medway Creek, Pottersburg Creek, Stoney Creek, Trout Creek and Waubuno Creek.

== History ==
The river was the location of an important battle of the War of 1812. The Battle of the Thames (also known as the Battle of Moraviantown) fought on October 5, 1813, between American General William Henry Harrison and British General Henry Proctor, along with Proctor's ally Tecumseh. Chief Tecumseh was killed in the battle.

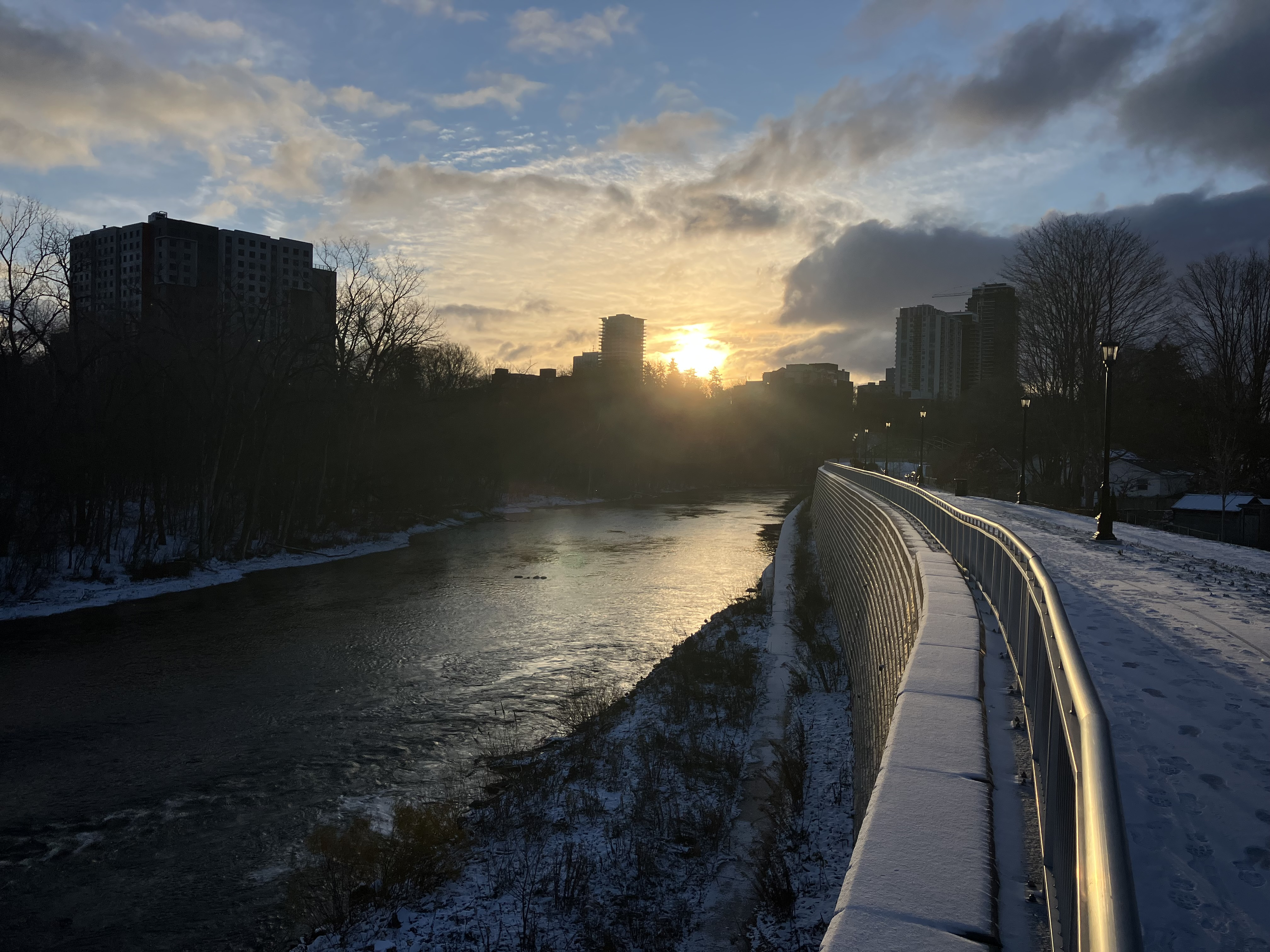
The Thames River in London, Ontario

In the final decades of the 19th century, pleasure boats began to operate on the Thames in London, offering service between the city and Springbank Park in Byron.

On May 25, 1881, the steamboat Victoria capsized and sank in the Thames near what is today Greenway Park in London, killing 182 passengers. After the disaster all ferries could only carry their maximum capacity, and the popularity of boating on the Thames dropped considerably.

In the early morning hours of July 11, 1883, heavy rainfall caused considerable flooding on the Thames, especially in London. The vessel Princess Louise, which had been laid up, was forced over Waterworks Dam and capsized, killing 7, while the Forest City was cast out into the river and partially damaged. This flood would be the first of two significant floods to strike the city.

On August 25, 1899, the Thames was set on fire and scuttled only feet from Waterworks Dam.

On April 27, 1937, the Thames River reached an all-time high of 21.5 feet (6.6 m) above normal flow resulting in 5 deaths and over 1000 homes being damaged.

On August 13, 1950, a launch capsized and sank in London and killed four passengers.

On August 14, 2000, the Thames River was designated a Canadian Heritage River.

During the weekend of February 24–25, 2018, abnormally persistent rains caused significant flooding along the banks of the river. Extensive property damage was observed in Chatham and nearby Thamesville.

== Natural history ==
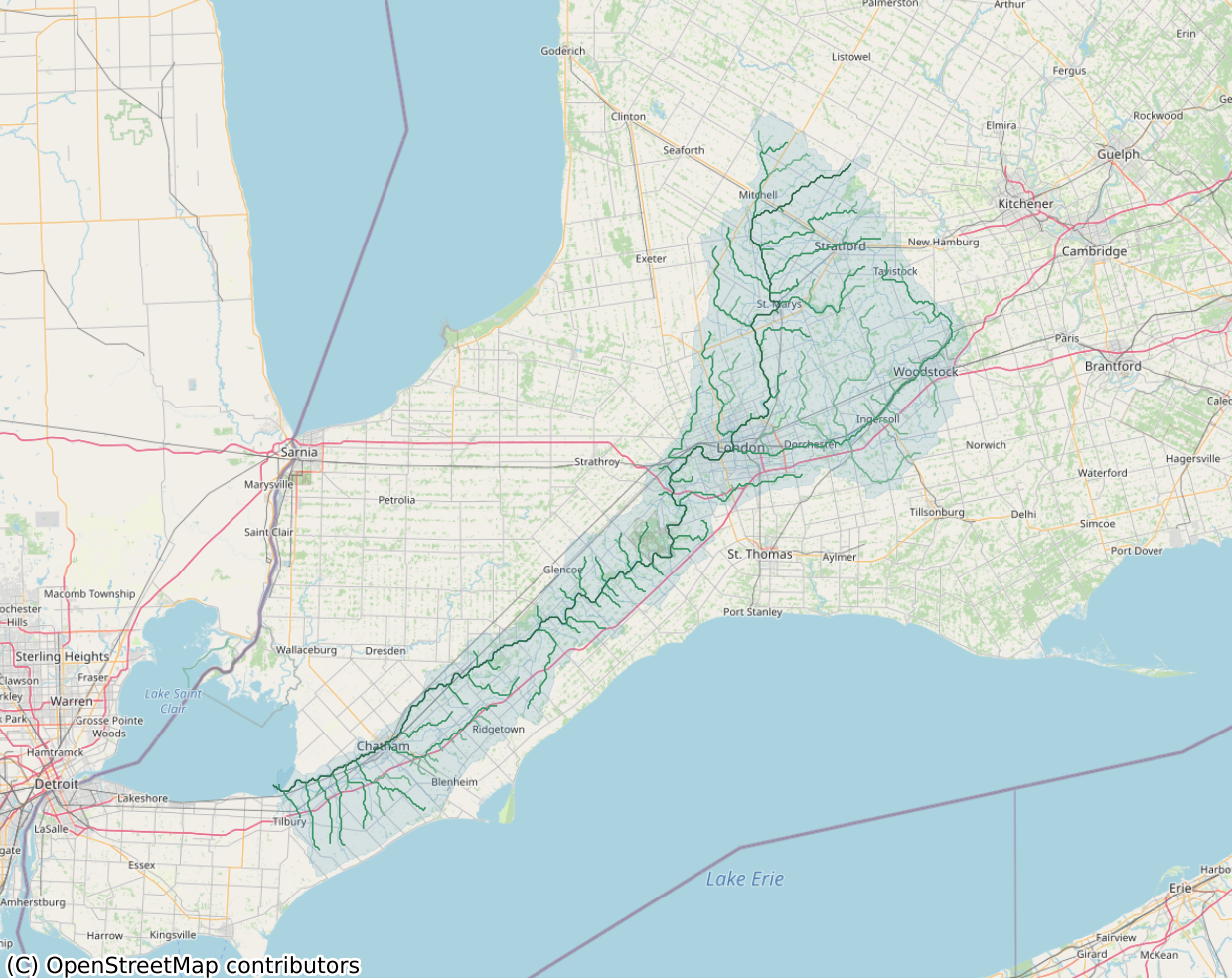
Watershed of the Thames

The Thames River is home to about 90 species of fish and 30 species of freshwater mussel. As one of the southern-most rivers in Canada, many of the species found in its waters are found almost nowhere else in the country, and a number are legally protected as species at risk, including Blanding's turtle, northern map turtle, common snapping turtle, stinkpot turtle, spiny softshell turtle, spotted turtle, northern ribbon snake, queen snake, kidneyshell, rainbow mussel, round pigtoe, wavy-rayed lampmussel, gravel chub, northern madtom, black redhorse, eastern sand darter, northern brook lamprey, pugnose minnow, river redhorse, silver shiner, and spotted sucker.

== Structures ==
Three dams are used to control seasonal flooding in the watershed: Wildwood Dam, located on Trout Creek which flows into the North Thames River; Pittock Dam, located on the Thames River near Woodstock; and Fanshawe Dam located on the North Thames River in the northeasterly area of London. A fourth dam at Springbank Park, downstream from the Forks, controlled water levels in central London from the 1870s until 2005 when it was closed for rehabilitation. One of the Springbank Dam's gates failed in 2008, causing the dam to be locked in the open position, and rehabilitation was delayed pending litigation between an engineering firm and the City of London. On January 9, 2018, London's civic works committee voted to decommission the Springbank Dam permanently.

Starting in the late 1800s, a railway embankment carried streetcars of the London Street Railway along the bank of the river to Springbank Park.
