= Sifton Bog =

Wetland in Canada

Sifton Bog Environmentally Significant Area
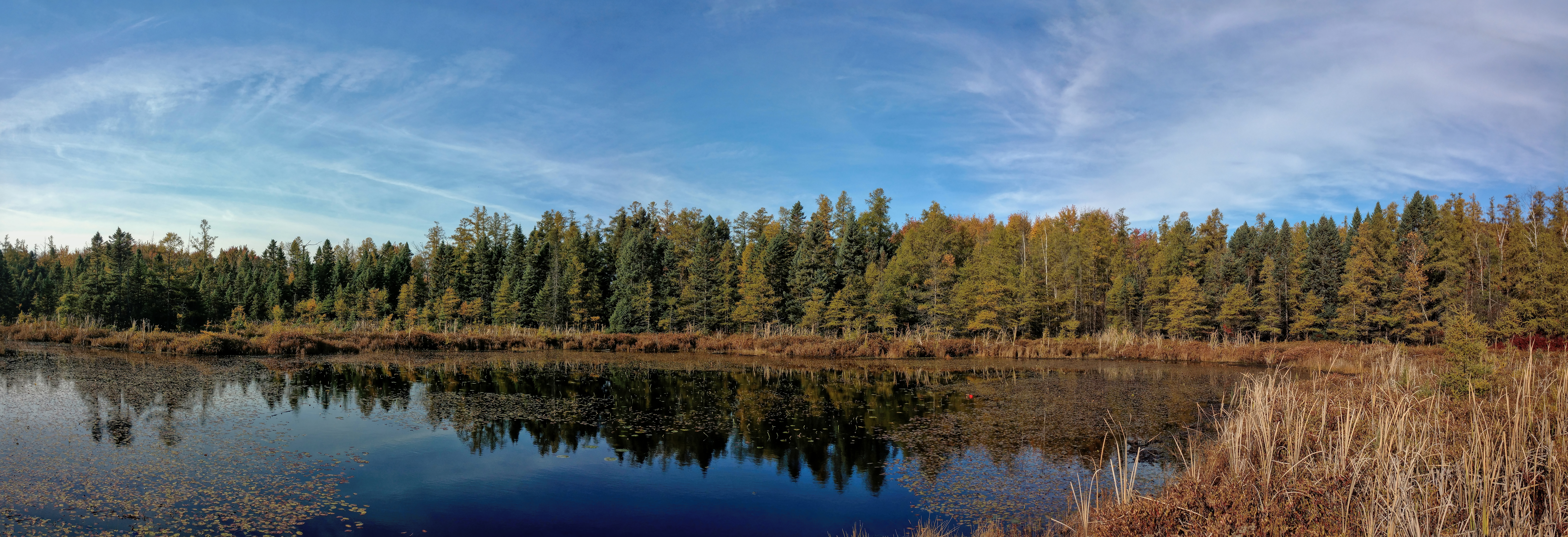
- Redmond's Pond

- Location within Southern Ontario
- Location: London, Ontario, Canada
- Coordinates: 42°58′14.63″N 81°19′21.77″W
- Area: 41.6 ha (103 acres)
- Created: 1967
- Governing body: Upper Thames River Conservation Authority
- Website: thamesriver.on.ca/parks-recreation-natural-areas/londons-esas/sifton-bog/

The Sifton Bog Environmentally Significant Area is a wetland jointly administered by the city of London, Ontario and the Upper Thames River Conservation Authority. It is located west of Hyde Park Road and south of Oxford Street inside the city limits of London, Southern Ontario, Canada. It is a Class 2 provincially significant wetland.

Prior to 1967 the wetland was called "Byron Bog", having been at that time within the boundaries of the village of Byron, but it was renamed following the donation of the land by the "Sifton Properties Limited". However, it had undergone a series of name changes before this time also, being variously named Foster's Bog and Redmond's Bog in the 1880s, after the occupants of the land at that time, and Spruce Bog in the 1890s. The name Byron Bog was used by the 1920s, but no record exists of its Native American name.

The Sifton Bog is one of the most southerly acidic bogs in Canada. It contains a number of rare species including four types of carnivorous plants. Among the latter are the sundews Drosera intermedia and Drosera rotundifolia and the purple pitcher plant Sarracenia purpurea. The central bog vegetation is dominated by Sphagnum and Chamaedaphne calyculata (leatherleaf), with a few short larches (Larix laricina) and black spruce (Picea mariana).

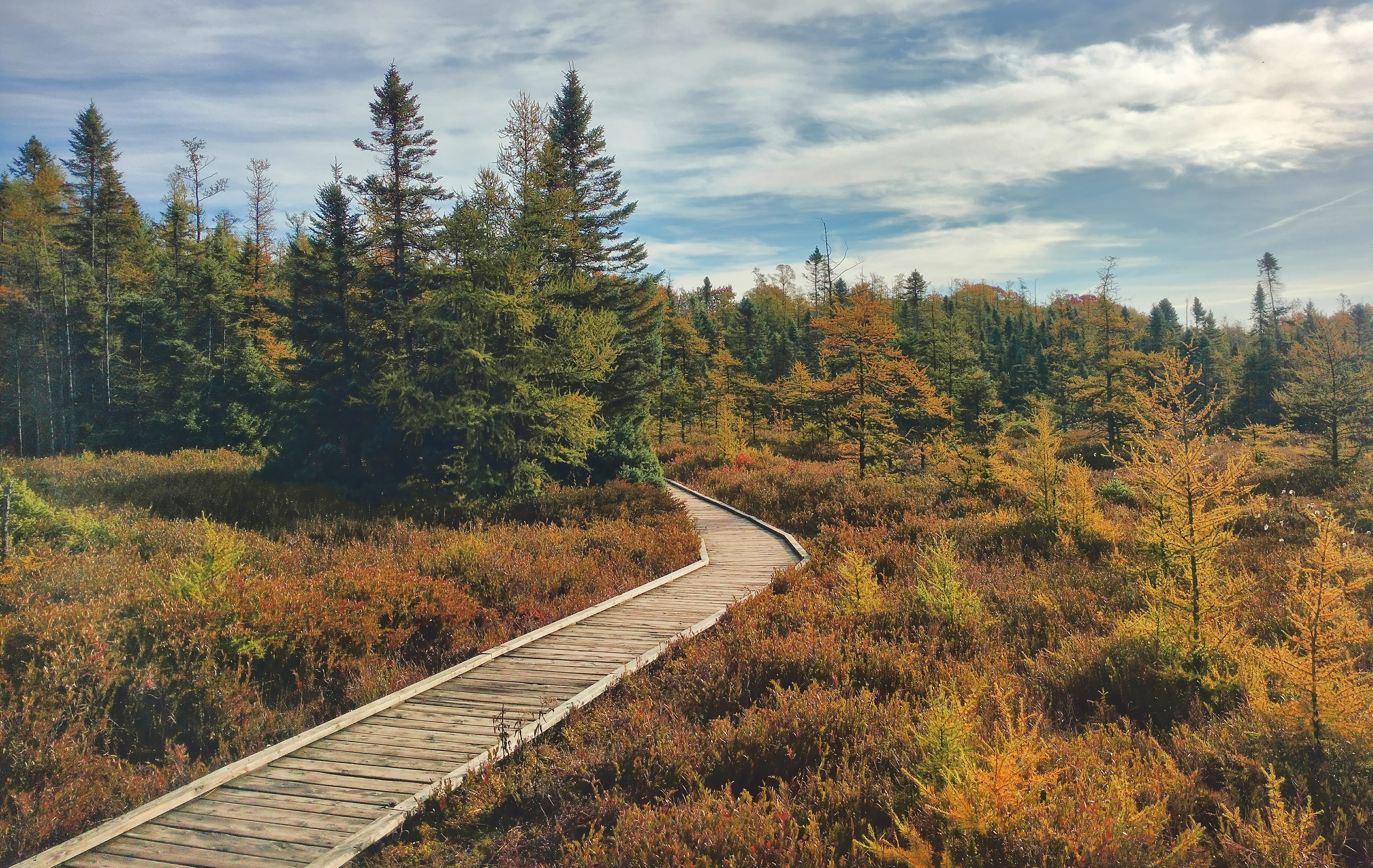
Sifton Bog boardwalk.

The depression that houses the bog was created like many local geologic features, by the effects of glaciation. A depression in the Ingersoll Glacial Moraine was left by retreating glaciers. The result was a pocket with no drainage which developed into the Sifton Bog. The 0.2 hectare pond at the centre of the bog, Redmond's Pond, is the remnant of what would have originally been a larger 23 hectare water body, which has gradually filled with peat over the last 10000 years. The peat layer at the centre of the bog has been measured at 18 m (60 ft).

Redmond's Pond is named after the Redmond family, who owned part of the land on which the bog is situated, between 1854 and 1900. The pond is less than 1.5 m (5 ft) deep, and has a pH of around 5. On the margins are surface growths of the carnivorous bladderwort Utricularia vulgaris and water lily Nuphar advena, with sparse growths of duckweed (Lemna minor) and water flax-seed (Spirodela polyrhiza).

The bog was previously used as a commercial source of sphagnum moss, an alternative to cotton gauze. It was mined during the First World War to support the war effort and the needs of local hospitals. The Alder Buckthorn, a plant not native to the bog, was harvested and used during the Second World War to produce gunpowder.

== Gallery ==
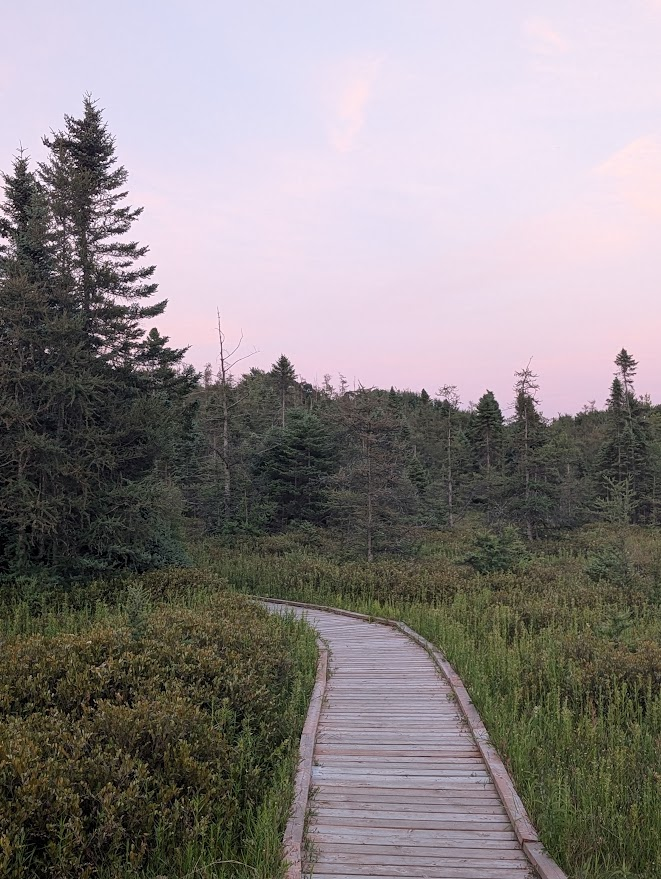
The boardwalk at Sifton Bog in London Ontario at sunset

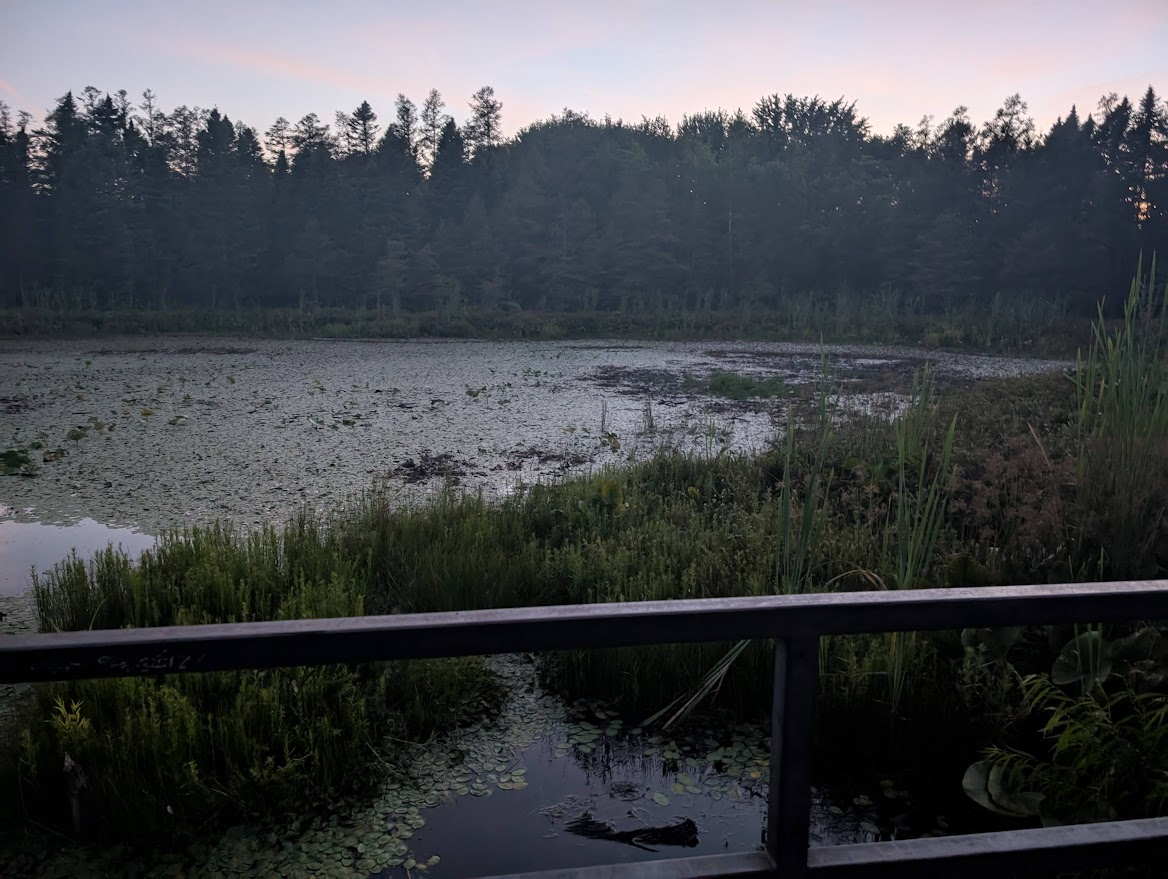
Redmond's pond from the viewing platform at Sifton Bog

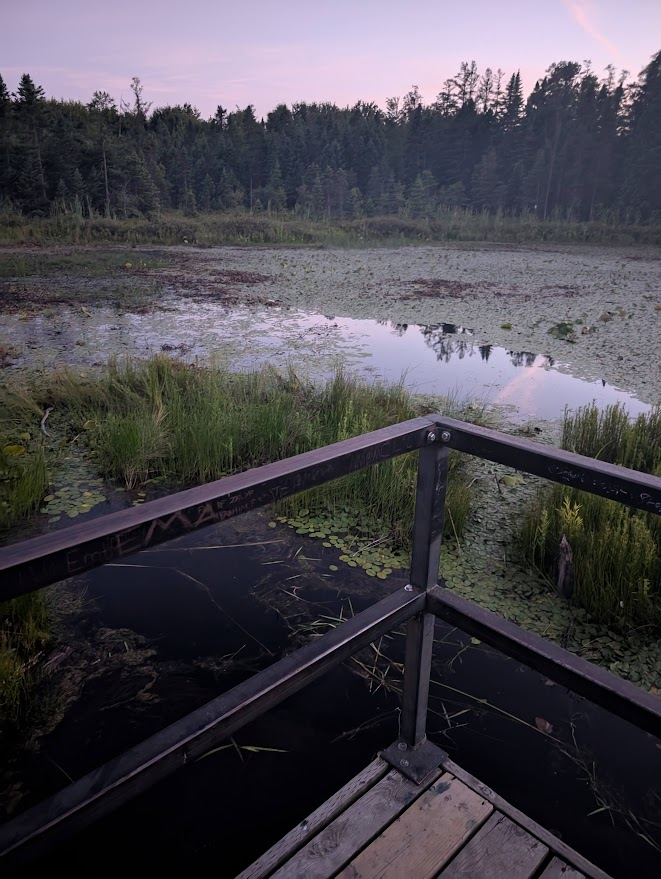
Redmond's pond at sunset

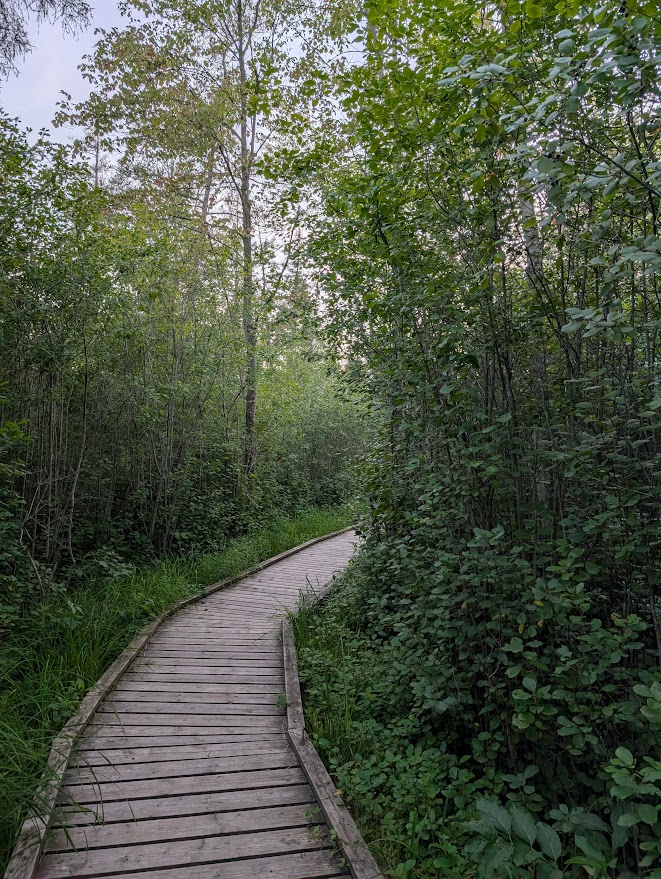
Sifton Bog boardwalk in summer
