= Upper Thames River Conservation Authority =

Conservation authority in Ontario, Canada

- Upper Thames River Conservation Authority
- Abbreviation: UTRCA
- Formation: 1947
- Type: conservation organization based in London, Ontario, Canada
- Legal status: active
- Purpose: advocate and public voice, educator and network
- Headquarters: 1424 Clarke Road, London, Ontario, Canada
- Region served: London - Oxford County, Ontario
- Official language: English, French
- Website: thamesriver.on.ca

The Upper Thames River Conservation Authority is a body based in London, Ontario, Canada. It was created in 1947. It was responsible for the construction of the Fanshawe Dam, completed in the 1950s, to control flooding from the Thames River, which runs through London. During the last ice age, the site of London was the terminus of a large glacier. When the region warmed at the end of the ice age, the glacier melted and receded North, leaving behind a drainage ditch and features such as Sifton Bog. As such, the Thames is a watershed for most of Western Ontario, and is therefore highly susceptible to seasonal flooding. In 1937, such flooding had devastating consequences, destroying over 1,000 homes, and causing millions of dollars in damage.

Today, the Upper Thames River Conservation Authority is mainly a not-for-profit agency which monitors flora and fauna welfare in the area and gives tours to local kids on school field trips. As of 2023, the current headquarters for the UTRCA is next to Fanshawe Lake at the Fanshawe Conservation Area.

== Conservation areas ==
The Upper Thames River Conservation Authority manages three conservation areas:

- Fanshawe Conservation Area
- Pittock Conservation Area
- Wildwood Conservation Area

== Wetlands ==
- Ellice Swamp is a Class 2 Provincially Significant wetland and largest wetland in the watershed.
- Dorchester Swamp, is a Class 1 wetland east of London attached to the Dorchester Mill Pond. It is a designated as an Area of Natural and Scientific Interest (ANSI) and a Carolinian Canada site. This swamp is 548 hectares is size.
- Sifton Bog, which is a Class 2 wetland within the City of London, is considered the most southerly intact bog in Canada.
- Golspie Swamp, northwest of Woodstock, is one of the largest remaining wooded areas in Oxford County.
