= Streetcars in London, Ontario =

Former public transit system in Ontario, Canada

London Street Railway

Operation
- Locale: London, Ontario, Canada
- Open: 1875; 151 years ago
- Close: 1940; 86 years ago
- Status: Defunct

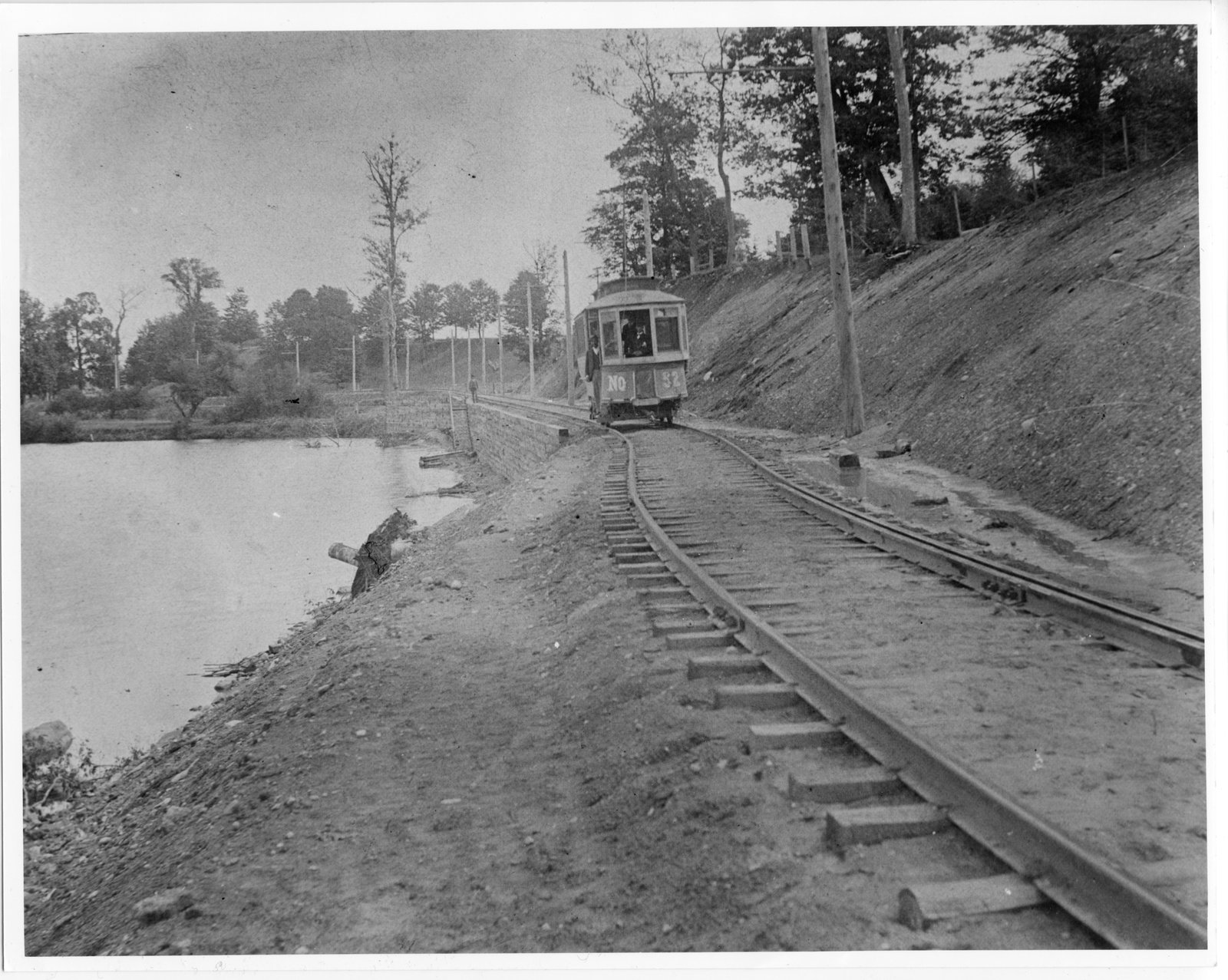
A streetcar travels beside the Thames River in downtown London, Ontario, in 1894

The London Street Railway (LSR) provided public transit to residents of London, Ontario, Canada, using streetcars from 1875 to 1940.

Established in 1873, LSR (which later became London Transit) began operation in 1875 using horsecars, basic and small passenger wagons pulled by horses. Like many street railway operators in Canada electrified routes began operation in closing years of the 19th century. LSR began electrification in 1895 using small cars similar to horsecars and gradually enlarged to full-size railcars.

After years of problems operating in winter, LSR switched over to diesel buses in 1940.

The city was also connected to Port Stanley, Ontario, via a series of luxury and larger interurban streetcars.

== See also ==
- London and Port Stanley Railway
